= Belgenland =

Belgenland was the name of two Red Star Line passenger ships:

- Belgenland (1878), operated by Red Star from 1879 until 1904
- Belgenland (1914), operated by Red Star from 1923 until 1934
