= Washington Avenue Immigration Station =

- Pier 53 (at Washington Ave. & Columbus Blvd.)
- South of Penn's Landing on the Delaware River
- Coordinates: 39.93246°N 75.14141°W
- Country: United States
- State: Pennsylvania
- County: Philadelphia County
- City: Philadelphia

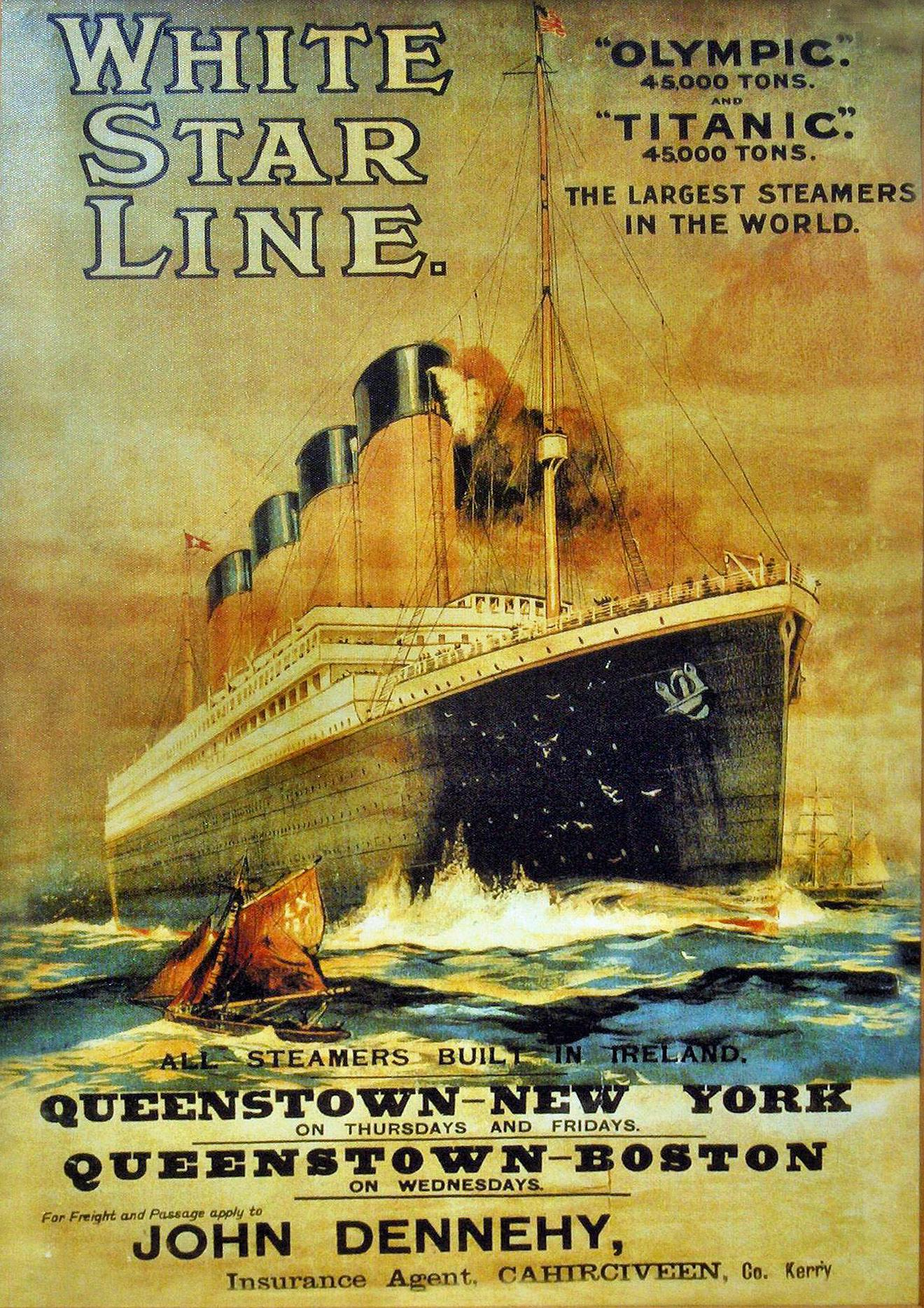
Britain's White Star Line carried many immigrants to Philadelphia

The Washington Avenue Immigration Station was an immigrant processing facility in Philadelphia, Pennsylvania, United States located at the end of Washington Avenue at Pier 53 on the Delaware River, south of modern-day Penn's Landing waterfront district. The building opened in 1873 and was demolished in 1915.

== History ==
=== Prior to 1873 ===
In 1873, the establishment of two American steamship companies sparked a period of active U.S. immigration that would last for the next fifty years. The more important of the two companies, the American Line, opened Philadelphia's first immigrant station at Pier 53 at Washington Avenue. The station was also supported by the Pennsylvania Railroad, which sought to increase its dominance of the U.S. passenger and freight railway market. The lower level of the station contained ticket booths where new immigrants could purchase train tickets for Pennsylvania Railroad destinations.

The bustling Washington Avenue waterfront was the site of Philadelphia's immigrant receiving station from the mid-1870s through 1915. A transportation hub, the avenue crossed with the various lines of the Pennsylvania Railroad. The railroad owned the Washington Avenue wharves, from which their trains transported raw materials, produce, sugar, grain, finished goods, and people—including newly arrived immigrants—to points within Philadelphia and across the country.

Prior to the station's construction, most European immigrants arrived in New York City and took a train to Philadelphia, or came directly to Philadelphia by slow-moving sailing ship. In 1873, the faster, more modern steamships began docking at Washington Avenue and the Pennsylvania Railroad built the two-story immigration station to receive the rapidly increasing number of immigrants arriving from eastern and southern Europe via the new Red Star and American steamship lines.

English and Irish and immigrants made up the bulk of Philadelphia's foreign-born population through the mid-1800s. They arrived on sailing ships originating mostly from the port of Liverpool, landing at Philadelphia in the warmer months when the Delaware River wasn't frozen. From 1799 until 1893, all ships destined for Philadelphia docked first at the Lazaretto, a quarantine hospital a few miles south of Philadelphia in Tinicum Township, Delaware County that was built in response to the devastating outbreak of yellow fever in 1793. At the Lazaretto ships were inspected and immigrants received medical examinations before proceeding up the Delaware to the Washington Avenue piers.

=== 1873 - 1915 ===
During its 42 years in operation from 1873 to1915, the Washington Avenue Immigration Station was the point of entry for just over one million immigrants, comprising about 5% of the total number of immigrants to the United States during that time. Immigrants arriving at the station were checked for various diseases and questioned about specific details of their origin before being allowed entry into the country. In some instances, unmarried women would not be allowed to enter; consequently, a designated area of the station became known as "the altar," due to its frequent impromptu wedding ceremonies.

Although the American Line began routes to New York's Ellis Island in the 1890s, it continued to offer weekly sailings and increased its Philadelphia bound fleet in the early 1900s, adding ships with local names, such as: Southwark, Kensington, Haverford, and Merion. Eastern and Southern European immigrants, departing from ports in Britain, France, Germany, the Netherlands, and Italy were regularly processed at the station. Other passenger lines offering direct passenger service to Philadelphia included: the British White Star Line, the Belgian Red Star Line, and the German Hamburg-America Line.

The First World War caused a significant decrease in the rate of immigration. In 1915, the facility was closed and the building was demolished, although immigration continued at Philadelphia until 1921. Immigrants arriving at Pier 53 were processed on-board their ships, after they had docked. Post-war changes to federal immigration laws led to a great decrease in new arrivals and immigration at Philadelphia eventually ceased altogether. A Pennsylvania state historical marker currently denotes the site of the former immigration station.

== Washington Avenue Green at Pier 53 ==
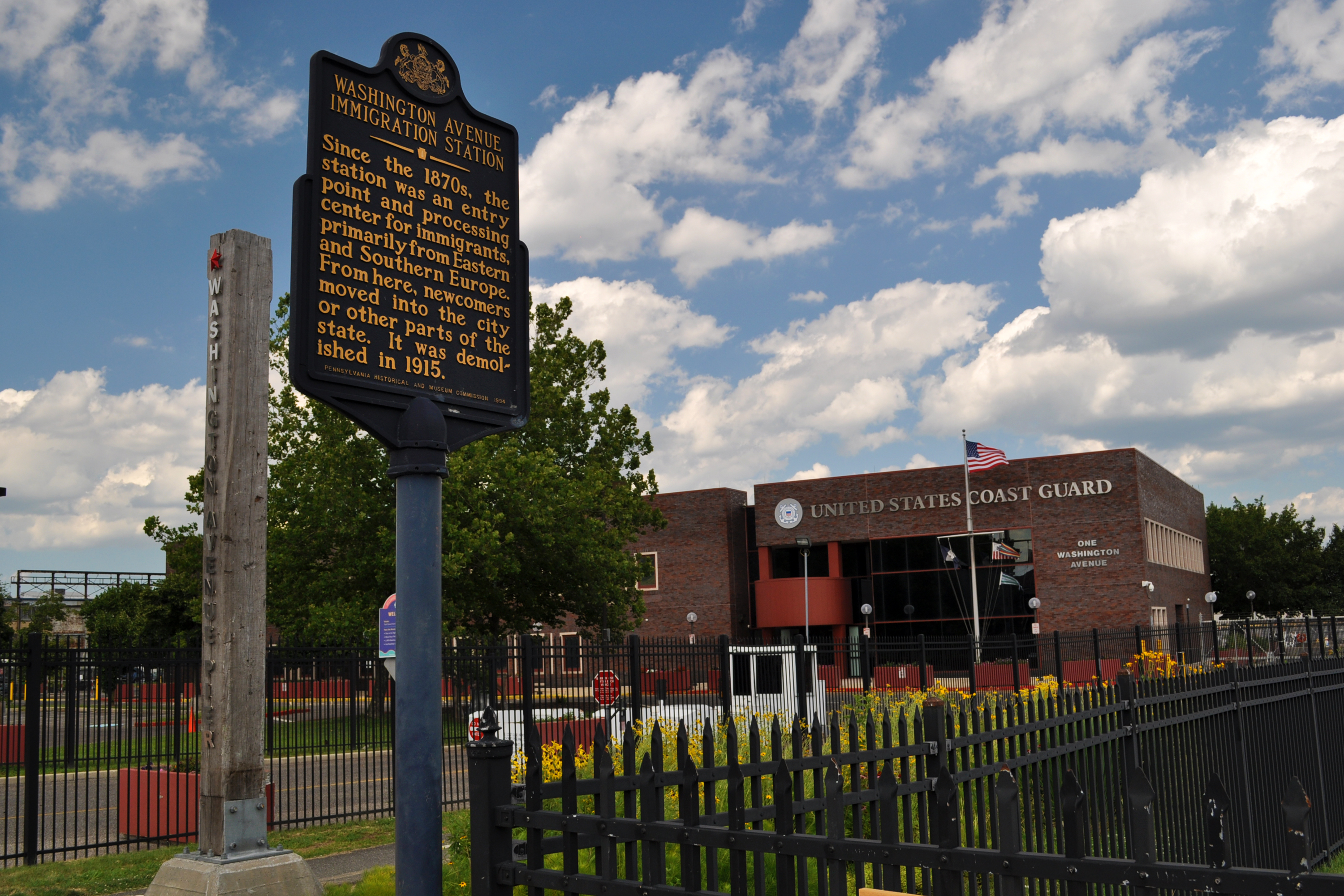
Washington Avenue Immigration Station Historical Marker

In 2010, after decades of disrepair, Pier 53 was revitalized into a new waterfront park. The renovated pier, now known as Washington Avenue Park, provides visitors with unique views along the Delaware River. The park also features walking paths, benches, an elevated boardwalk and a sanctuary for indigenous species of animals and vegetation. The focal point of the park is a sculpture titled "Land Buoy", a creation by New York artist Jody Pinto. The work, which consists of a spiral staircase circling a 55-foot spire topped by a soft blue light, serves as a beacon for boaters and acts as a memorial to Philadelphia's former immigration station, the landing place where a million people entered the country a century ago.

Washington Avenue Park became the first stage of an initiative, named Washington Avenue Green, attempting to preserve public space along the Delaware River. As of 2017, Washington Avenue Green had expanded from Pier 53, along the river as far south as Pier 70.

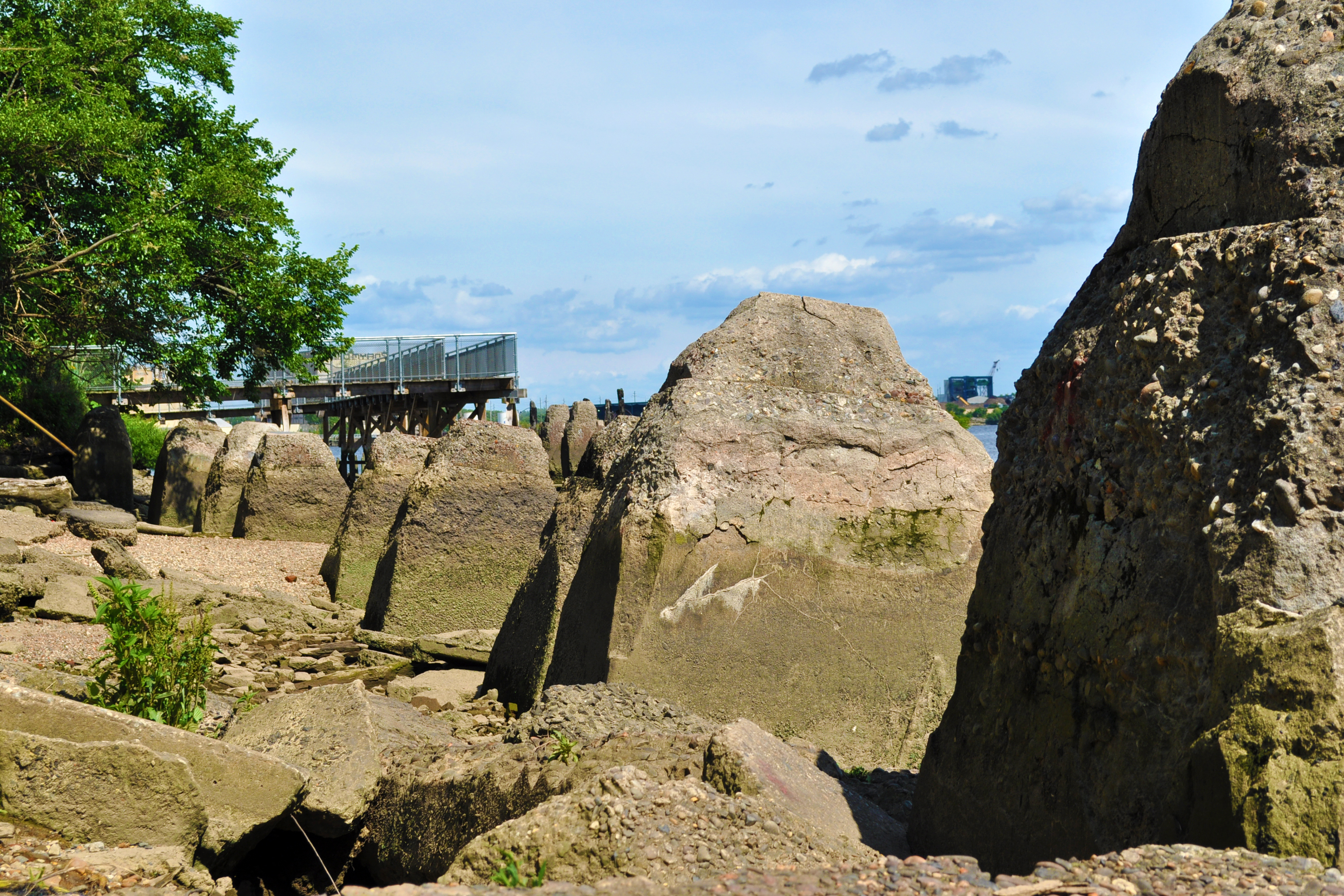

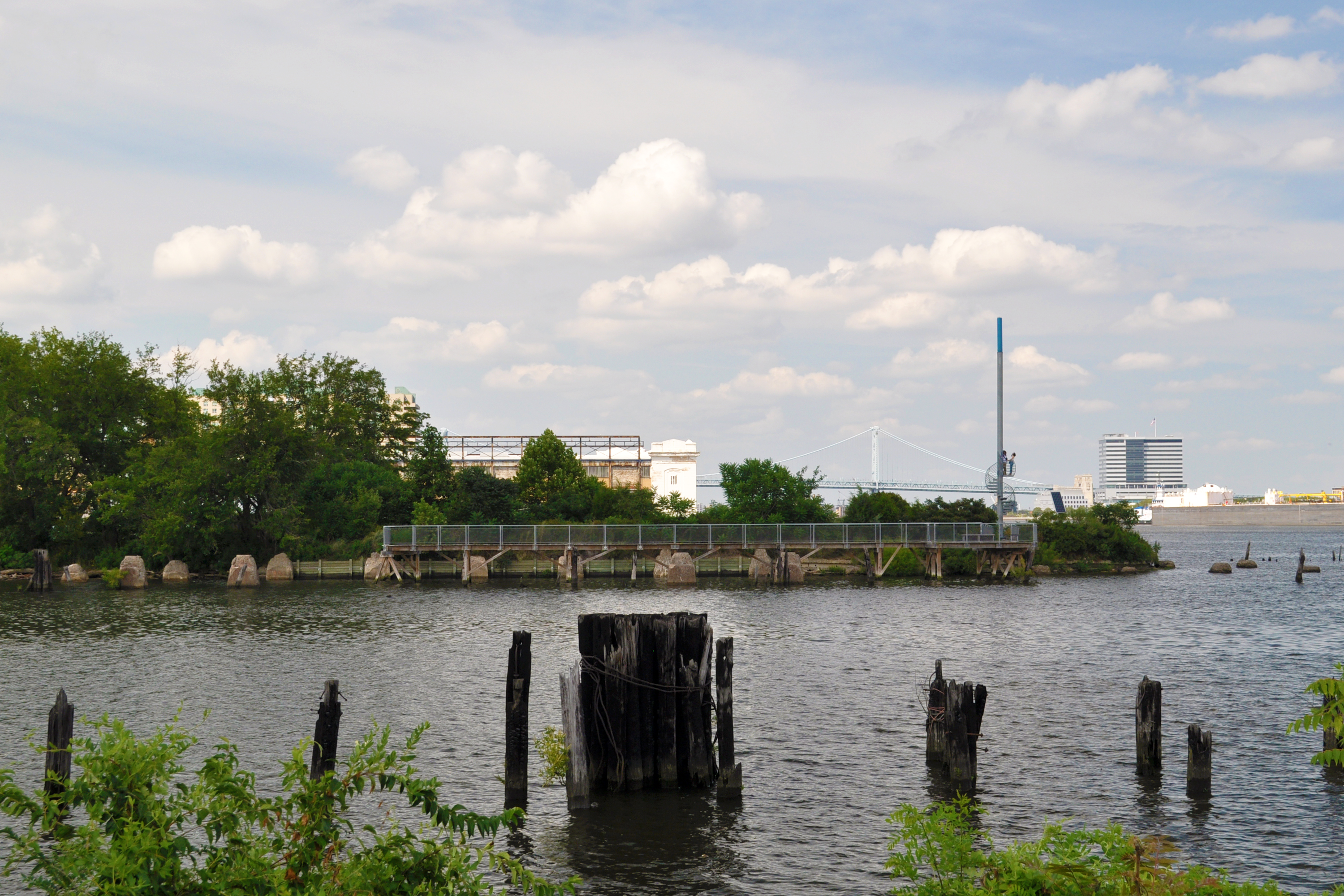

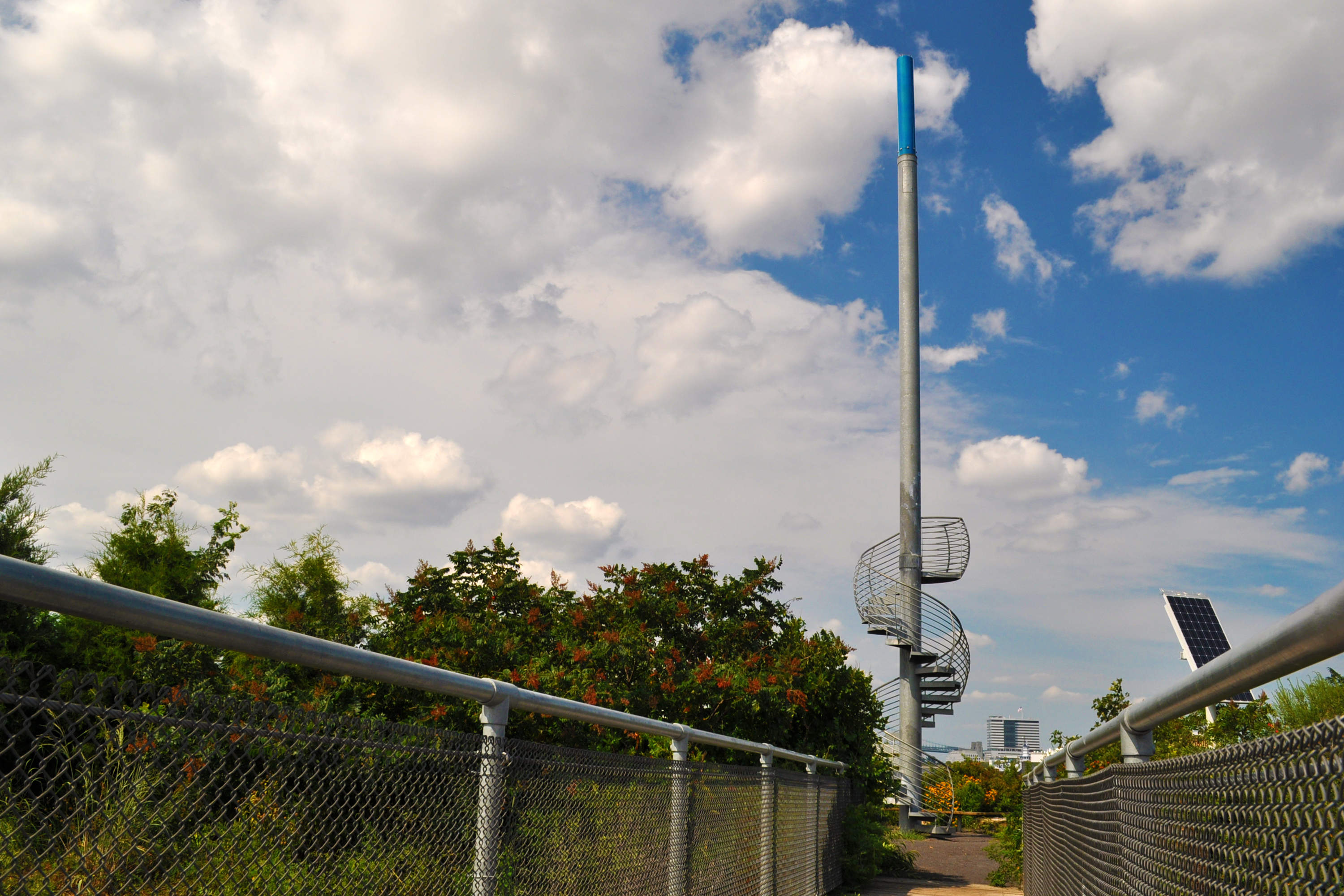

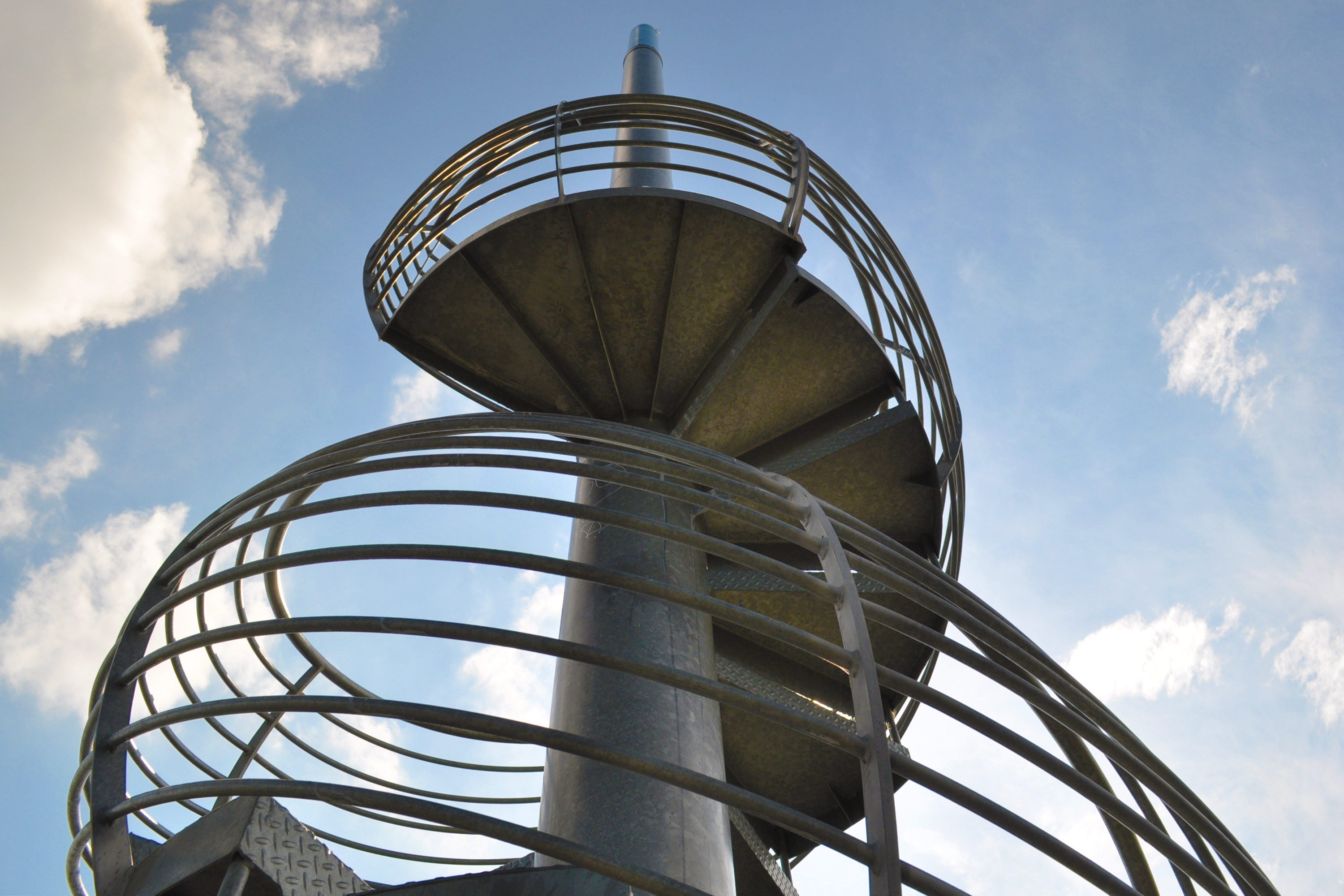

== See also ==
- Washington Avenue Historic District (Philadelphia)
- Immigration to the United States
- History of Philadelphia
