= Van Mieghem =

Van Mieghem (pronounced [vɑ ˈmiɣəm]) is a Dutch/Flemish surname.

People with this surname include:

- Eugeen Van Mieghem (1875–1930), artist
- Daryl van Mieghem (born 1989), footballer
- Hilde Van Mieghem (born 1958), actress

See also:

- Mount Van Mieghem, mountain in Antarctica
