= SS Rhynland =

- SS Rhynland at sea, c. 1890

History
- Name: SS Rhynland (1879-1906); SS Rhyna (1906)
- Owner: Red Star Line (1879-1906)
- Operator: Red Star Line (1879-1895); American Line (1895-1903); Red Star Line (1903-1906)
- Builder: Barrow Shipbuilding Company, Barrow in Furness
- Launched: 10 March 1879
- Fate: Scrapped in 1906

General characteristics
- Tonnage: 3,689 gross register tons (GRT)
- Length: 402.8 ft (122.8 m)
- Beam: 40.2 ft (12.3 m)
- Propulsion: Triple expansion steam engine
- Speed: 12.5 knots (23.2 km/h)
- Capacity: 1,150 passengers; 150 first class; 1,000 third class

SS Rhynland was a passenger ship owned by the Red Star Line. She was built in 1879 by Barrow Shipbuilding Company. The ship was sold to Italy in 1906, renamed Rhyna, and was subsequently scrapped.

== Service ==
She made her maiden voyage on 10 June 1879 sailing across the Atlantic from Antwerp, Belgium, to New York City, New York. She was notable for carrying famous songwriter Irving Berlin to America when he was 5. The ocean liner ran aground on Fenwick Island, Delaware, on 31 January 1899. The vessel was refloated on 4 February.

== Red Star Line ==
The Red Star Line was an ocean passenger line founded in 1871 as a joint venture between the International Navigation Company of Philadelphia, which also ran the American Line, and the Société Anonyme de Navigation Belgo-Américaine of Antwerp, Belgium. The company's main ports of call were Antwerp in Belgium; Liverpool and Southampton in the United Kingdom; and New York City and Philadelphia in the United States. The company operated until 1935 when, due to the economic depression, it ceased trading. Its assets were eventually sold to the Holland-America Line.

The company was founded by Clement Griscom, who led it from its founding until the International Mercantile Marine Co. (IMMC) took it over in 1902. Red Star Line survived IMMC's financial crisis in 1915. In the 1930s Red Star Line was part of Arnold Bernstein Line.

== Heritage ==
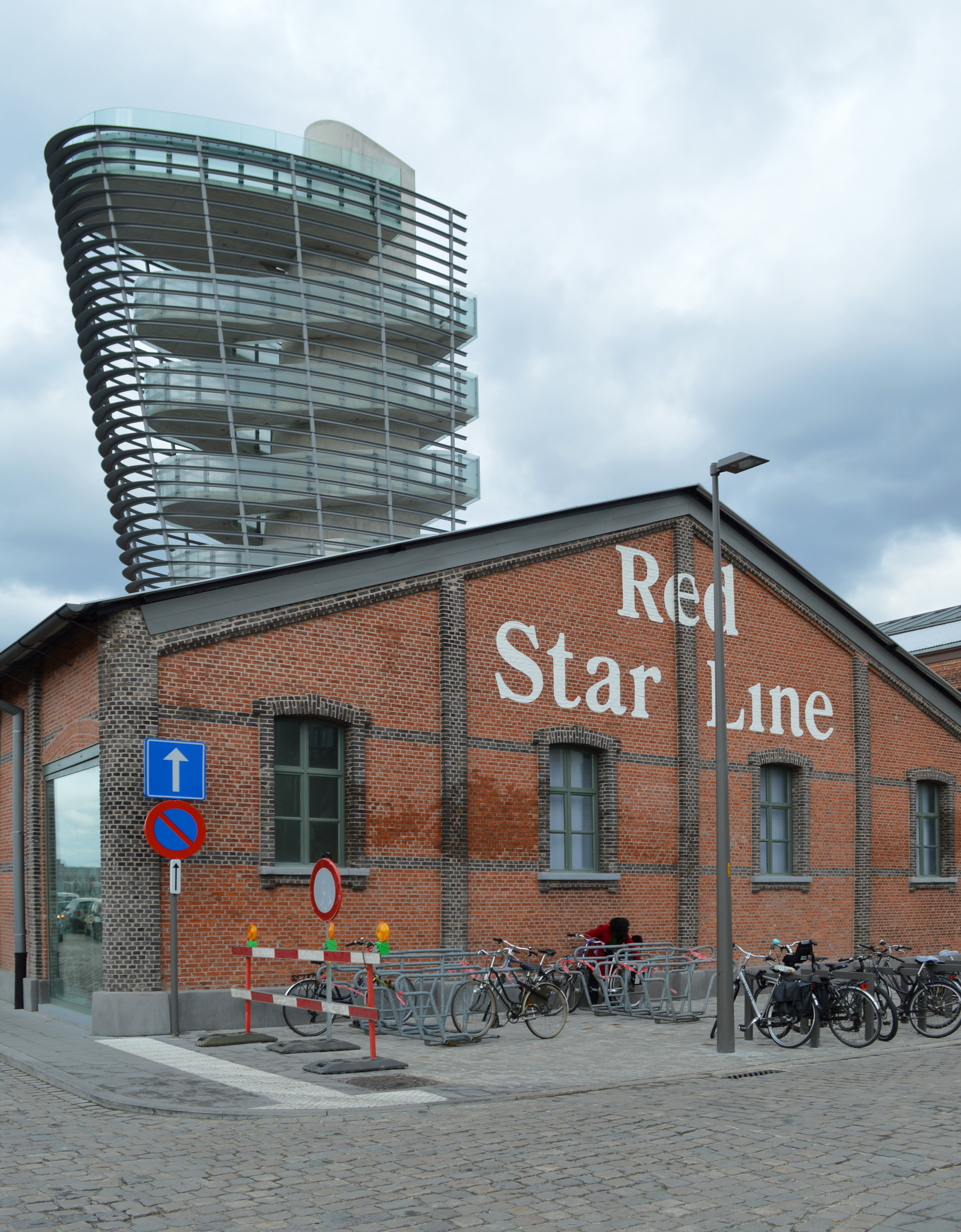
Red Star Line museum at Antwerp

The former warehouses of the Red Star Line in Antwerp were designated as a landmark and reopened as a museum on 28 September 2013 by the City of Antwerp. The main focus of the museum is the travel stories that could be retrieved through relatives of the some two million Red Star Line passengers. In the exhibition the visitor follows the travelers' tracks from the travel agency in Warsaw until their arrival in New York. Works of art depicting the Red Star Line emigrants made by the Antwerp artist Eugeen Van Mieghem (1875–1930) will be exhibited there, next to Red Star Line memorabilia of the collection of Robert Vervoort.

== Bibliography ==
- Flayhart, William (2000). The American Line. New York: W. W. Norton & Company. ISBN 0-393-04710-5.
- Harnack, Edwin P (1938) [1903]. All About Ships & Shipping (7th ed.). London: Faber and Faber. p. 566.
- United States Life-Saving Service (1900). Annual Report of the United States Life-Saving Service, for the Fiscal Year Ending June 30, 1899. U.S. Government Printing Office.
