= UB8 =

UB8 may refer to:

- UB8, a postcode district in the UB postcode area
- SM UB-8, World War I German submarine
