= Haverford =

Haverford may refer to:

- Haverford College, a coeducational, undergraduate liberal arts college in Haverford, Pennsylvania
- The Haverford School, a private, all-boys preparatory day school in Haverford, Pennsylvania
- Haverford High School, a public high school serving all of Haverford Township, Pennsylvania
- Haverford, Pennsylvania, a town partly in both Haverford and Lower Merion Townships, Pennsylvania
- Haverford Township, Pennsylvania, a township of Delaware County, west of Philadelphia
- SS Haverford, an American transatlantic liner used in World War I
- Tom Haverford, a Parks and Recreation character played by Aziz Ansari

== See also ==
- Havertown, Pennsylvania, the name created to designate ZIP Code 19083, the area of which is wholly within, and a portion of, Haverford Township
- Haverfordwest, a town in Wales, after which Haverford, Pennsylvania, was named
