= List of shipwrecks in June 1889 =

The list of shipwrecks in June 1889 includes ships sunk, foundered, grounded, or otherwise lost during June 1889.

== 1 June ==
List of shipwrecks: 1 June 1889
Ship	State	Description
Alice and Kate	United Kingdom	The schooner was beached in Ballyassard Creek. Her crew survived. She was on a voyage from Newport, Monmouthshire to Letterfrack, County Galway.
Kangaroo	South Australia	The steamship was lost off, or in, the Brisbane River. Scrapped in situ.
Ohio	United States	The whaler was wrecked on the Alaskan coast.

== 2 June ==
List of shipwrecks: 2 June 1889
Ship	State	Description
Laurenze	Norway	The brig foundered in the North Sea 50 nautical miles (93 km) north north west of the Orkney Islands, United Kingdom. Her crew took to a boat; they were rescued by the fishing smack Bessie (United Kingdom). Laurenze was on a voyage from Liverpool, Lancashire, United Kingdom to Vardø.

== 5 June ==
List of shipwrecks: 5 June 1889
Ship	State	Description
Charlotte	United Kingdom	The steamship collided with the steamship Manauense (Flag unknown) in the River Mersey and was beached at New Brighton, Cheshire. Charlotte was on a voyage from Garston, Lancashire to Dublin.

== 6 June ==
List of shipwrecks: 6 June 1889
Ship	State	Description
Queen of Nations	United Kingdom	The barque was abandoned off the mouth of the Kowie River. Her crew were rescued by the Kowie Lifeboat. Queen of Nations was on a voyage from Colombo, Ceylon to New York, United States. She was towed in to East London, Eastern Cape by the steamship Clan Alpine (United Kingdom).
Zacharie	France	The brig collided with a steamship and sank off the Cape Finisterre, Spain. Two of her crew were reported missing. Survivors were rescued by the steamship Virginia (United Kingdom).

== 7 June ==
List of shipwrecks: 7 June 1889
Ship	State	Description
Anna Sarah	United Kingdom	The ship collided with the steamship Faraday (United Kingdom) off the Dudgeon Lightship ( Trinity House) and was damaged.
Hero	United Kingdom	The schooner foundered off Hartland Point, Devon. Her crew survived. She was on a voyage from Penrhyn, Cornwall to Runcorn, Cheshire.

== 8 June ==
List of shipwrecks: 8 June 1889
Ship	State	Description
Moscor	United Kingdom	The steamship ran aground at Leith, Lothian. She was on a voyage from Leith to Kronstadt, Russia. She was refloated.

== 9 June ==
List of shipwrecks: 9 June 1889
Ship	State	Description
Queen of Nations	United Kingdom	The barque was driven ashore and wrecked at East London, Cape Colony.

== 10 June ==
List of shipwrecks: 10 June 1889
Ship	State	Description
Abeona	United Kingdom	The steamship ran aground near the Swantewitz Lightship (Germany). She was on a voyage from Swinemünde to Stettin, Germany.

== 11 June ==
List of shipwrecks: 11 June 1889
Ship	State	Description
Harold, and Toward	United Kingdom	The steam collier Harold collided with the steamship Toward and sank in the English Channel 5 nautical miles (9.3 km) west of the Royal Sovereign Lightship ( Trinity House) with the loss of one of her seventeen crew. Survivors were rescued by Toward. Harold was on a voyage from Bilbao, Spain to the River Tyne. Toward was on a voyage from London to Plymouth, Devon. She was severely damaged and put in to Southampton, Hampshire.

== 12 June ==
List of shipwrecks: 12 June 1889
Ship	State	Description
Salisbury	United Kingdom	The steamship ran aground in the River Severn downstream of Sharpness, Gloucestershire. She was later refloated and taken in to Sharpness.
Silac	United Kingdom	The steamship was driven ashore at St. Davids, Pembrokeshire.

== 13 June ==
List of shipwrecks: 13 June 1889
Ship	State	Description
Alsace-Lorraine	France	The tug was run into by Austin Friars (United Kingdom) and sank at Cette, Hérault.
Ariadne	United Kingdom	The yacht collided with the steamship Wapping (United Kingdom) off the Cross Sand, in the North Sea off the coast of Essex. Ariadne was on a voyage from Cowes, Isle of Wight to Grimsby, Lincolnshire. She was towed in to Tilbury, Essex by Wapping.
David	Russia	The schooner collided with the steamship Trave (Germany) and sank in the English Channel. Her eight crew were rescued by Trave. .
Fenix	Romania	The lighter was driven ashore at "Dudeshti".
Grimsel	United Kingdom	The steamship ran aground on the Holm Sand, in the North Sea off the coast of Suffolk. She was refloated with the assistance of tugs and resumed her voyage.
Helena	United Kingdom	The steam launch sank in the Belfast Lough off Greencastle, County Donegal. She was on a voyage from Carrickfergus to Belfast, County Antrim.
Jacques Lafarée	Belgium	The fishing smack collided with the barque Marie (Norway) and foundered in the North Sea 50 nautical miles (93 km) off Lowestoft, Suffolk. Her crew were rescued.
Lenore	United Kingdom	The schooner ran aground off Greenock, Renfrewshire. She was refloated with the assistance of a tug.

== 14 June ==
List of shipwrecks: 14 June 1889
Ship	State	Description
Akaba, and Glenroy	United Kingdom	The steamships collided at Suez, Egypt and were both damaged.
Bulldog	United Kingdom	The steamship collided with the steamship Waverley (United Kingdom) in the River Avon. Bulldog was on a voyage from Bristol, Gloucestershire to Avonmouth, Somerset.
Grimsel	United Kingdom	The steamship ran aground on the Holm Sand, in the North Sea off the coast of Suffolk. She was refloated with assistance.
Lenore	United Kingdom	The schooner ran aground off Greenock, Renfrewshire. She was refloated with the assistance of a tug.
Maria Casabona	Sweden	The ship collided with a ferryboat at New York, United States and was severely damaged. She was on a voyage from New York to Stockholm. She put back to New York for repairs.
Midlothian	United Kingdom	The steamship collided with the quayside at Avonmouth and was damaged. She was on a voyage from Penzance, Cornwall to Avonmouth.
Oriente	Flag unknown	The ship collided with a tug at Saugor, India and was damaged. She put back to Calcutta.
295	Romania	The lighter sank at Kustendje.

== 15 June ==
List of shipwrecks: 15 June 1889
Ship	State	Description
Ananda	United Kingdom	The steamship was severely damaged by fire at South Shields, County Durham.
Monroe	United Kingdom	The steamship ran aground in the River Ouse at Whitton, Lincolnshire. She was on a voyage from Seville, Spain to Goole, Yorkshire.
Sir Charles Wetham	United Kingdom	The steamship ran aground off Rothesay, Isle of Bute. She was refloated.
Kansas, and Lestrid	United Kingdom	The steamships collided in the River Mersey. Kansas was severely damaged. Lestrid was beached.

== 16 June ==
List of shipwrecks: 16 June 1889
Ship	State	Description
Pauline	France	The brig was driven ashore near Vlissingen, Zeeland, Netherlands. She was on a voyage from "Requejada" to Antwerp, Belgium.

== 18 June ==
List of shipwrecks: 18 June 1889
Ship	State	Description
Dagmar	United Kingdom	The ship ran aground in the River Wear. She was refloated and taken in to Sunderland, County Durham.
Grampus	United Kingdom	The steamship ran aground at Ardrossan, Ayrshire and was damaged. She was on a voyage from Belfast, County Antrim to Ardrossan.
Rajore	United Kingdom	The full-rigged ship ran aground in the River Tay. She was on a voyage from Calcutta, India to Dundee, Forfarshire. She was refloated and towed in to Dundee.
St. Mark	United Kingdom	The steamship ran aground on a reef off Cape Finisterre, Spain and foundered. Her 23 crew were rescued by Spanish fishing boats. She was on a voyage from Sardinia, Italy to Antwerp, Belgium.
Wild Rose	United Kingdom	The brig was wrecked at Bragança, Brazil. Her crew were rescued.
Unnamed	United Kingdom	The barge sank off Hartlepool, County Durham. The sole person on board survived.

== 20 June ==
List of shipwrecks: 20 June 1889
Ship	State	Description
Mary Jane Gregory	United Kingdom	The schooner collided with the steamship Persian Prince (United Kingdom) and sank in the River Mersey. Her crew were rescued. Mary Jane Gregory was on a voyage from Runcorn, Cheshire to Stranraer, Wigtownshire.
Palma	Germany	The ship caught fire at Cardiff, Glamorgan, United Kingdom.

== 22 June ==
List of shipwrecks: 22 June 1889
Ship	State	Description
Bleville	United Kingdom	The steamship was driven ashore at Sadras, India. She was on a voyage from Swansea, Glamorgan to Madras, India.
Runic	United Kingdom	The barque departed from Calcutta, India for Callao, Peru. No further trace, presumed subsequently foundered with the loss of all fifteen or sixteen hands.
Yolande	United Kingdom	The yacht was hit by a stray shot from HMS Ajax (1880) (Royal Navy), which was conducting target practice in Lulworth Bay, and was damaged. A steam launch was despatched to tow Yolande in to Portland, Dorset.

== 23 June ==
List of shipwrecks: 23 June 1889
Ship	State	Description
Joven Vicenta	Spain	The ship was wrecked at Cape Gata, Cyprus. Her crew were rescued by the steamship Robert Harrowing (United Kingdom.

== 24 June ==
List of shipwrecks: 24 June 1889
Ship	State	Description
Cape Verde, and Iolanthe	United Kingdom	The ship Cape Verde collided with Iolanthe and sank in Hobson's Bay. Cape Verde' was on a voyage from London to Melbourne, Victoria.. Iolanthe was severely damaged. She was on a voyage from Liverpool, Lancashire to Melbourne.

== 25 June ==
List of shipwrecks: 25 June 1889
Ship	State	Description
Jessie W. Knight	United States	The schooner was sunk in a collision with the steamship Wm. R. McCabe (United States) in Chesapeake Bay. Her captain, his wife, and one crewman killed.

== 28 June ==
List of shipwrecks: 28 June 1889
Ship	State	Description
Edward S. Webster	United States	The schooner sank after striking a submerged rock at the entrance to Coal Harbor, District of Alaska (55°20′30″N 160°39′30″W). Her twelve crew survived. She was later condemned, sold, and refloated.

== 29 June ==
List of shipwrecks: 29 June 1889
Ship	State	Description
Anne Sophia	United Kingdom	The brigantine ran aground in the River Thames at Gravesend, Kent.
Grenada	United States	The steamship was driven ashore and wrecked near Point Tejupan, Mexico. She was on a voyage from San Francisco, California to Panama City, Colombia.
Hartburn	United Kingdom	The steamship ran aground at Limerick. She was on a voyage from Odessa, Russia to Limerick.
Nautilus	Spanish Navy	The training ship was drive ashore near San Sebastián. She was refloated and taken in to San Sebastián.
Samuel and Emma	United Kingdom	The fishing smack was run into and sunk by the steamship Mascotte (Flag unknown) 25 nautical miles (46 km) off the Leman and Ower Lightship ( Trinity House). Her crew were rescued by Mascotte.

== 30 June ==
List of shipwrecks: 30 June 1889
Ship	State	Description
Adria	Sweden	The ship ran aground at "Snackmor". She was refloated with the assistance of a tug.
William Armstrong	United States	The ferry sank in the St. Lawrence River between Morristown, New York and Brockville, Ontario, Canada. One passenger was killed.

== Unknown date ==
List of shipwrecks: Unknown date in June 1889
Ship	State	Description
Aeren, and Rinde	Norway; Imperial Russian Navy	The barque Aeren collided with the man-of-war Rinde at Kronstadt. Both vessels were severely damaged.
Amy Dora	Flag unknown	The steamship ran aground at Pensacola, Florida, United States. She was refloated on 11 June and resumed her voyage.
Anna Christina	(Canada)	The ship was driven ashore at "Rosier", Quebec.
Antelope	United Kingdom	The ketch was driven ashore at Blakeney, Norfolk. She was on a voyage from Newcastle upon Tyne, Northumberland to Colchester, Essex.
Anna, or Anton	Germany	The schooner struck a rock at Natal, Brazil and foundered. Her crew were rescued. She was on a voyage from Macau to Rio de Janeiro, Brazil.
Ascupart	Flag unknown	The steamship was driven ashore near Santa Fé.
Bilbao	United Kingdom	The steamship collided with Zadne (Flag unknown) and was beached at Tilbury, Essex. She was on a voyage from London to Goole, Yorkshire. She was refloated on 23 June and taken in to Tilbury.
Borghild	Flag unknown	The ship was wrecked on Grindston Island, in the Magdalen Islands, Nova Scotia, Canada. Her crew were rescued.
Bruckley Castle	Flag unknown	The ship was driven ashore on Sand Island, Alabama, United States. She was later refloated and towed in to Mobile, Alabama.
Cairne	United Kingdom	The ship sank at Călărași, Romania.
Cape Race	United Kingdom	The barque collided with the barque Speranza (Norway) and was damaged. Cape Race was on a voyage from the River Plate to Cowes, Isle of Wight.
Carrie	United Kingdom	The steamship was driven ashore in the Bosphorus. She was refloated.
Cashmere	United Kingdom	The barque caught fire at sea. She was on a voyage from Manila to Iloilo, Spanish East Indies. She put back to Manila.
Charles Morand	United States	The steamship was driven ashore in the Bahamas. She was on a voyage from Manzanilla, Trinidad to New York. She was refloated and taken in to Long Key, Florida.
Charles Sheffield	Flag unknown	The steamship collided with the steamship North Star (flag unknown) and sank in Lake Superior. Her crew were rescued.
Charles W. Oulton	United Kingdom	The ship was driven ashore and wrecked at St. Mary's.
USS Constellation	United States Navy	The training ship was driven ashore at Cape Henry, North Carolina.
County of Carnarvon	United Kingdom	The ship foundered at sea. She was on a voyage from Newcastle, New South Wales to Valparaíso, Chile. A lifeboat was found in Tākou Bay, but appeared to have drifted away from the ship, rather than having been used.
Craigendoran	United Kingdom	The steamship was driven ashore at Luleå, Sweden. She was later refloated.
Ecuador	United Kingdom	The barque was wrecked near the mouth of the Rio Grande do Sul with the loss of a crew member.
Emile	France	The ship was driven ashore and wrecked in the Magdalen Islands. Her crew were rescued.
Engineer	United Kingdom	The steamship ran aground in the Thames Estuary. She was on a voyage from Gandia, Spain to London.
Goldsborough	United Kingdom	The steamship ran aground in the Nieuwe Diep. She was refloated and resumed her voyage.
Hartland	United Kingdom	The tug ran aground and was beached near Garth Ferry, Anglesey. She was on a voyage from Cardiff, Glamorgan to Fleetwood, Lancashire.
Heinrich	Germany	The schooner ran aground near Kronstadt].
Hereward	United Kingdom	The ship was wrecked at "Mante Hedmoso", near Bahia Blanca, Argentina. Her crew were rescued.
Iser	United Kingdom	The ship was driven ashore at "Basses" and severely damaged at the bows. She was refloated and taken in to Trincomalee, Ceylon.
John Pitcairn	United Kingdom	The brig was driven ashore in the River Thames at Northfleet, Kent.
Katy	United Kingdom	The steamship was driven ashore on Heiligholmen, Sweden. She was later refloated and taken in to Oskarshamn, Sweden.
König Oskar	Sweden	The steamship caught fire at sea. She was beached at Cap Arkona, Germany.
Laurenze	Norway	The ship was abandoned at sea. Her crew were rescued. She was on a voyage from Liverpool, Lancashire, United Kingdom to Vardø.
Michigan	United Kingdom	The steamship ran aground at Point Anconi, Nova Scotia She was on a voyage from Montreal, Quebec, Canada to London. She was refloated and resumed her voyage.
Morven	United Kingdom	The steamship ran aground on the Westra Finngrundet, in the Gulf of Bothnia. She was later refloated with the assistance of a steamship and taken in to Stockholm, Sweden in a leaky condition.
Navarra	Flag unknown	The steamship ran aground at Liverpool. She was on a voyage from Bilbao, Spain to Liverpool. She was refloated and taken in to Birkenhead, Cheshire, United Kingdom in a leaky condition.
Nigel	United Kingdom	The steamship caught fire at Falmouth, Cornwall. The fire was extinguished.
Pomona	United Kingdom	The steamship was wrecked at Baracoa, Cuba. Her crew were rescued. She was on a voyage from New York to Jamaica.
Semaria	Norway	The barque ran aground off Honfleur, Calvados, France. She was refloated and taken in to Honfleur.
Solferino	Italy	The steamship was driven shore at Santa Marinella. She was later refloated.
Staffa	United Kingdom	The barque caught fire in the Atlantic Ocean and was abandoned. Her crew were rescued.
Vindomora	United Kingdom	The steamship ran aground at Stubben, Denmark. She was on a voyage from Sunderland, County Durham to Copenhagen, Denmark.
Westernland	United States	The steamship ran aground in the Scheldt at Lillo, Antwerp, Belgium. She was on a voyage from New York to Antwerp. She was refloated with the assistance of a tug and completed her voyage.
Winifred	United Kingdom	The ship ran aground on the Shipwash Sand, in the North Sea off the coast of Suffolk.
Ystava	Norway	The barque was run into by the steamship Adelaide Lavarello (Italy) and sank off Martín García Island, Uruguay.
295	Romania	The lighter sank at Constanţa.
Unnamed	Flag unknown	The steamship was lost off Lockeport, Nova Scotia.
