= SS Haverford =

American ocean liner

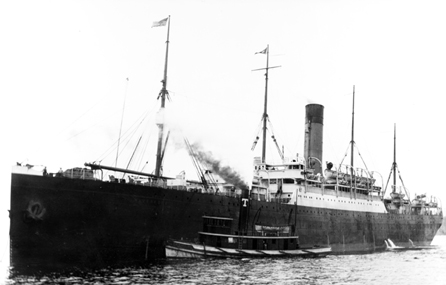

History

United Kingdom
- Name: Haverford
- Owner: 1901–1914: International Navigation Co.; 1914–1915: British Admiralty
- Operator: American Line (1901–1921); White Star Line (1920–1925); Red Star Line; Dominion Line
- Port of registry: Liverpool
- Route: 1901–1903: Southampton – New York; 1903–1914: Liverpool – Philadelphia
- Builder: John Brown & Company, Clydebank
- Yard number: 345
- Launched: 4 May 1901
- Completed: 1901
- Maiden voyage: Southampton – New York, 4 May 1901
- Identification: UK official number 113489; 1919: code letters SNQH; by 1913: call sign MJH
- Fate: Scrapped 1925
- Notes: one of the largest ships hit by U-boats in World War I

General characteristics
- Type: Ocean liner
- Tonnage: 11,635 GRT, 7,493 NRT
- Length: 531.0 ft (161.8 m)
- Beam: 59.2 ft (18.0 m)
- Depth: 27.2 ft (8.3 m)
- Decks: 3
- Installed power: 2 × triple-expansion steam engines; 893 NHP
- Propulsion: 2 × screws
- Speed: 14 knots (26 km/h; 16 mph)
- Passengers: 150 second-class; 1,700 third-class
- Armament: 4 x 6-inch (150 mm) guns (as merchant ship, 1914)
- Notes: One funnel; four masts; twin screws; Identical to her sister ship: Merion

SS Haverford was a British transatlantic liner built in 1901 for the American Line on the route from Southampton to New York, then on the route from Liverpool to Boston and Philadelphia. During her early years, this ship, mainly designed to transport migrants and goods, was the victim of several incidents. Her company was integrated into the International Mercantile Marine Co. (IMM) in 1902 and she was used by other companies within the trust, the Dominion Line and the Red Star Line.

The start of World War I did not stop her civilian service. It was not until January 1915 that she was requisitioned as a troop transport. During the conflict, she was attacked on several occasions by German submarines, one of them succeeding in torpedoing her on June 12, 1917. Although eight people died, the ship was beached and then repaired. After the war, she resumed, from 1919, her service to Philadelphia.

In 1921, another company within the IMM, White Star Line, took over the Philadelphia route previously operated by American Line, as well as the Haverford. Contrary to the usual practice of the company, the ship was not renamed, and continued to serve Philadelphia. From 1922, she returned to her original company for several crossings from Hamburg, then joined the White Star again. In 1924, worn out, the ship was sold to Italian shipbreakers, and scrapped the following year.

== Characteristics ==
Haverford was a medium-sized ocean liner, with tonnages of 11,635 gross register tons (GRT) and 7,493 NRT. She was 531.0 feet (161.8 m) long by 59.2 feet (18.0 m) beam. She had one funnel and four masts along the centerline. Her propulsion was provided by triple-expansion engines, allowing her to reach an average speed of 14 knots (26 km/h; 16 mph), rather slow for the time on the transatlantic route. This low speed was explained by the purpose of the ship, which was intended to transport large quantities of emigrants (1,700 third-class passengers), as well as a few second-class passengers (150 at the start). This capacity was subsequently modified, and the ship carried 1,308 third- and 216 second-class passengers during the end of her career. Besides these passengers, the ship was also designed to carry a significant amount of cargo. She had seven holds, and her hull was divided into eleven watertight compartments.

== Transatlantic ocean liner (1901–1915) ==
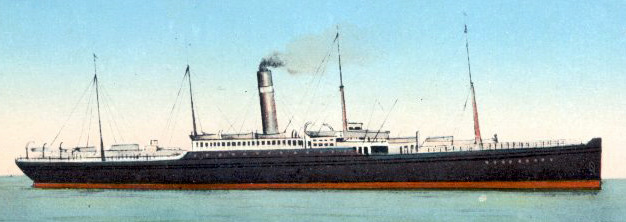
Postcard image of Haverford's sister Merion

SS Haverford was constructed by John Brown & Company of Clydebank, Scotland and funded by Clement Griscom Director of the International Navigation Company. After her launch on 4 May 1901, she was completed during the following August. The plans of her company were modified and the Haverford finally made her maiden voyage on an experimental basis on the route from Southampton to New York via Cherbourg. After this rotation, the ship was loaned to the Red Star Line (the two companies belonging to the International Navigation Company) which used her on the route from Antwerp to New York from 9 November 1901 to 8 March 1902.

The Haverford and her sister ship, Merion were identical in design and named after two suburbs on the Philadelphia Main Line just west of Pennsylvania's largest city. The ships were designed for a single passenger classification with accommodations called "Second Cabin" considered equal to first class on other ships. Haverford was launched six months prior to Merion.

After briefly serving the Southampton to New York route, Haverford was transferred to the Liverpool – Philadelphia route by 1903. The ship also occasionally was used by other companies within the trust International Mercantile Marine Company serving for the Red Star Line (Antwerp-New York route) and Dominion Line (Liverpool-Halifax-Portland).

On 14 June 1906 an explosion occurred aboard Haverford, killing 13 people at Liverpool docks. The explosion was attributed to explosive fumes produced by a load of 45 tons of Fels-Naptha soap in its cargo. The ship's owners attempted to sue the manufacturers of the soap, but the case was rejected by the United States District Court as adequate ventilation was not provided aboard the ship to deal with the known hazards of Naptha fumes.

== World War I (1915–1920) ==
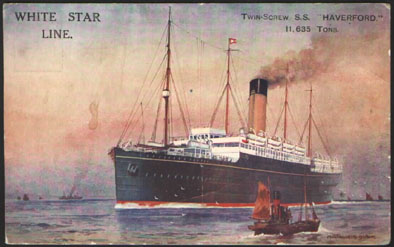
1920s postcard of Haverford

The outbreak of World War I did not immediately lead to the requisition of the Haverford, which continued her service in 1914 without incident. It was not until January 1915 that she was requisitioned and transformed into a troop transport, initially in order to serve the Dardanelles, which she did until 1916, before returning to the Atlantic. In 1917, the ship suffered heavy damage in a torpedo attack off the west coast of Ireland by the German U-boat, U-94. In 1918, after a six-month hiatus for repairs, the ship was again attacked by a German submarine in the North Atlantic Ocean, surviving with far less damage. The ship was then used to repatriate American troops, before being returned to American Line in January 1919.

== Post World War I (1920–1925) ==
Haverford returned to passenger service on the Philadelphia-Liverpool route for the American Line, making her first voyage in June, 1920. In Philadelphia, the ships docked at Pier 53, the site of the former Washington Avenue Immigration Station (1873–1915). After 1915, immigrants were processed onboard arriving ships. The Haverford was transferred to White Star Line in 1921 and retained the original ship name. This was unusual for White Star, as most names of acquired ships were changed to a more typical White Star name, usually ending in "-ic".

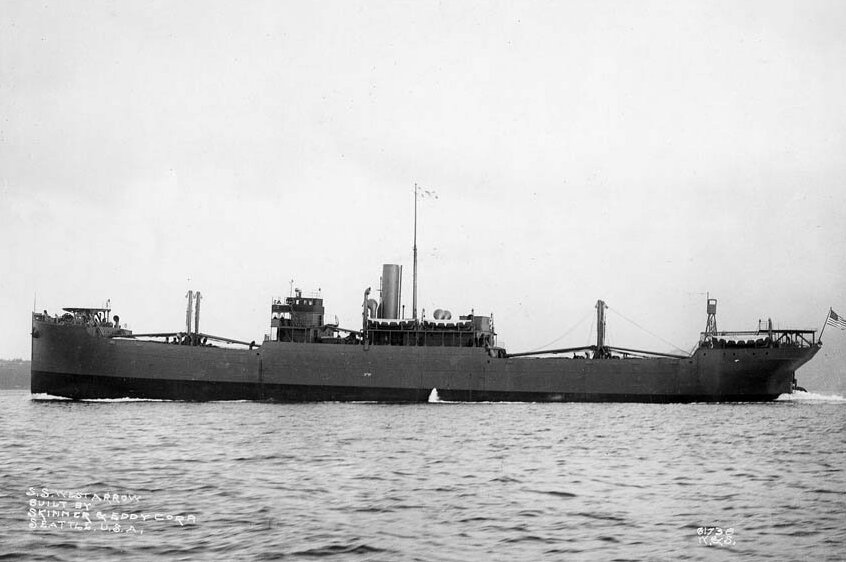
West Arrow, with which Haverford collided in 1923

On 1 April 1921, she made her first crossing for her new company, still between Liverpool and Philadelphia. During the winter of 1922 (from January to April), being useless on this route, she was loaned to the American Line, which used her on the route from Hamburg for New York. She then returned to the route from Liverpool to Philadelphia for the White Star; a stopover this time being added at Boston. She was joined by the Pittsburgh in June 1922. This service was disturbed by a major incident: on 19 September 1923, Haverford collided with the US cargo ship West Arrow. The Haverford got away with little damage, but West Arrow required $50,000 in repairs.

In 1924, the liner continued her crossings, but began to experience structural and electrical problems which sent her several times to dry dock. After a last voyage, on 27 August, between Liverpool, Belfast, Glasgow and Philadelphia, the ship was withdrawn from service. In December, she was sold to an Italian shipbreaker for £29,000, and then left for Italy where she was scrapped the following year.

== Gallery ==
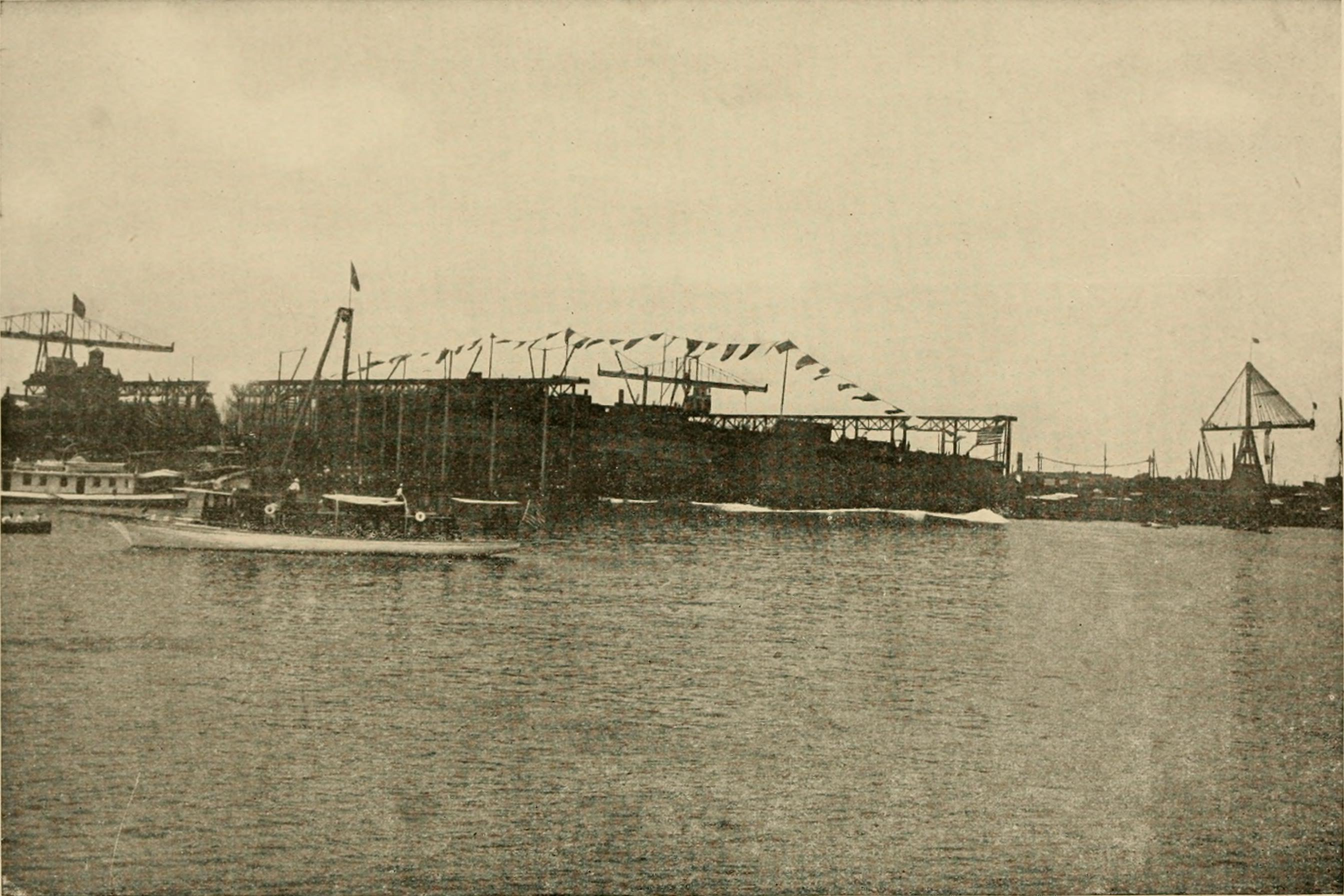
The port of Philadelphia in 1914

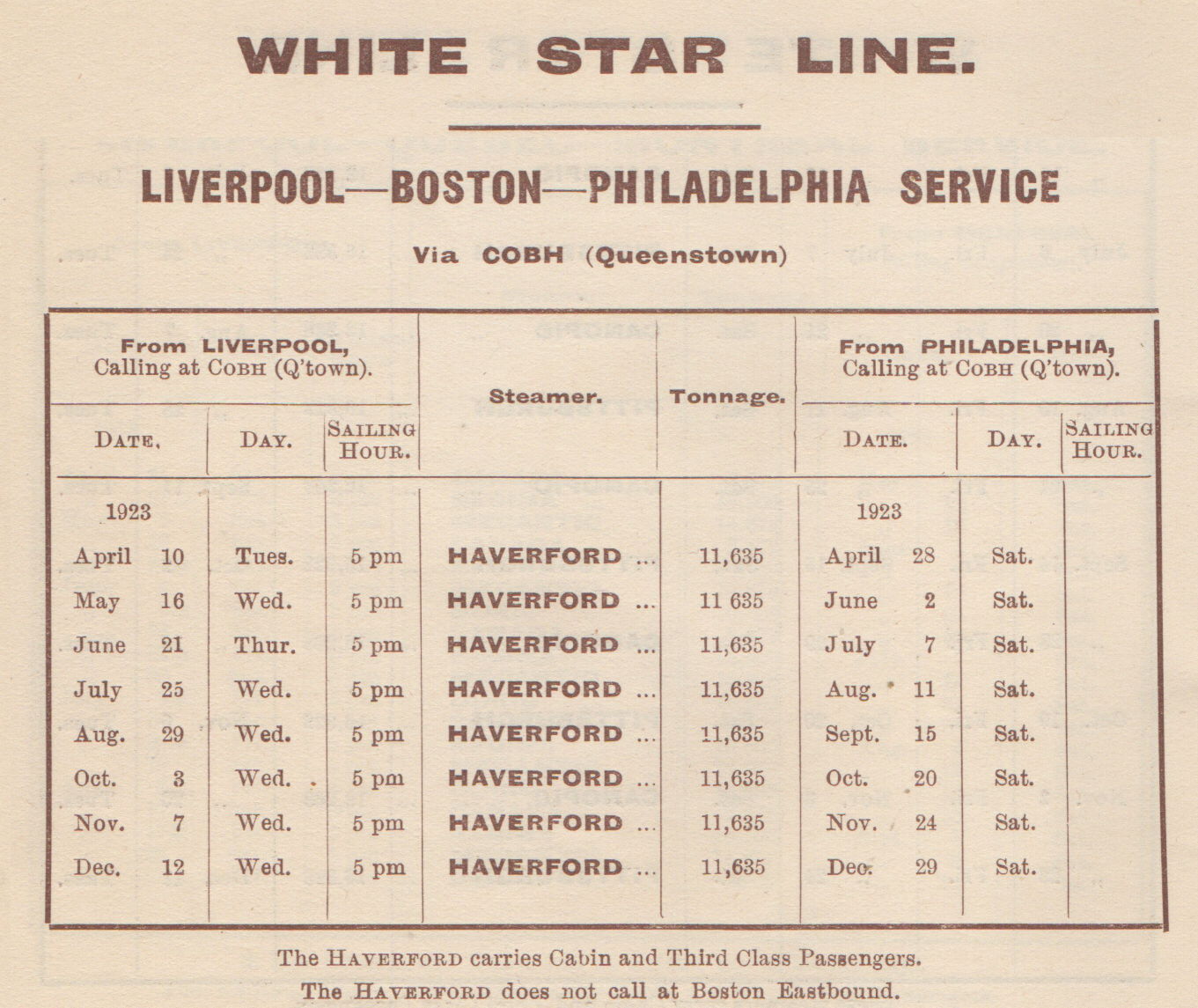
Sailings of Haverford, April–December 1923

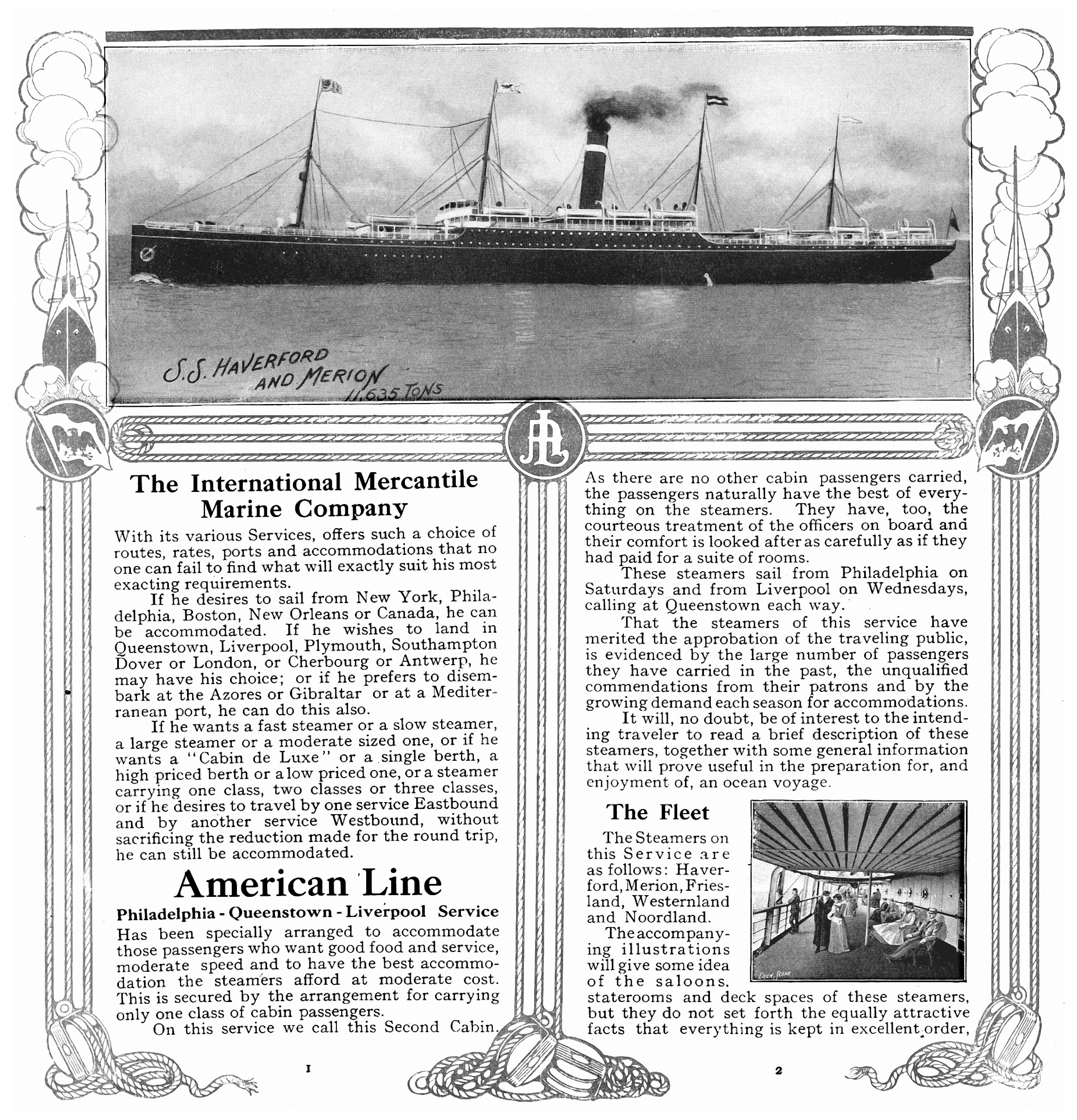
American Line 1907 brochure for Haverford and Merion's Philadelphia – Queenstown – Liverpool service

== Bibliography ==
- Anderson, Roy Claude (1964). White Star. Prescot: T. Stephenson & Sons Ltd. OCLC 3134809.
- de Kerbrech, Richard (2009). Ships of the White Star Line. Shepperton: Ian Allan Publishing. ISBN 978-0-7110-3366-5.
- Eaton, John; Haas, Charles (1989). Falling Star, Misadventures of White Star Line Ships. Patrick Stephens Ltd. ISBN 1-85260-084-5.
- Haws, Duncan (1990). White Star Line. Merchant Fleets. Vol. 17. Hereford: TCL Publications. ISBN 0-946378-16-9. OCLC 50214776.
- The Marconi Press Agency Ltd (1913). The Year Book of Wireless Telegraphy and Telephony. London: The St Katherine Press.
