= SS Merion =

American ocean liner

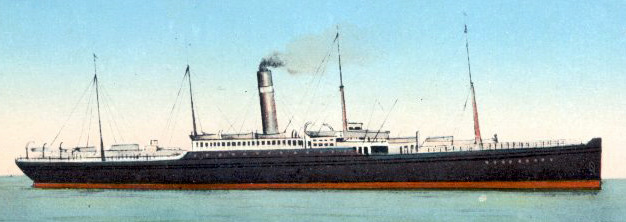
- Postcard image of SS Merion in passenger service

History
- Name: SS Merion
- Owner: 1902–1914: International Mercantile Marine; 1914–1915: British Admiralty
- Operator: 1902–1903: Dominion Line; 1903–1914: American Line; 1907: Red Star Line (1 voyage); 1914–1915: British Admiralty
- Port of registry: (United Kingdom of Great Britain and Ireland) Liverpool
- Route: 1902–1903: Liverpool–Boston; 1903–1914: Liverpool–Philadelphia; 1907: Antwerp–New York (1 voyage)
- Builder: John Brown & Company, Clydebank
- Yard number: 345
- Launched: 26 November 1901
- Completed: February 1902
- Maiden voyage: Liverpool–Boston, 8 March 1902
- Fate: Torpedoed and sunk, 31 May 1915
- Notes: one of the largest ships hit by U-boats in World War I

General characteristics
- Type: Ocean liner
- Tonnage: 11,621 GRT
- Length: 161.7 m (530 ft 6 in)
- Beam: 18.0 m (59 ft 1 in)
- Propulsion: 2 × triple-expansion steam engines; 2 × propellers
- Speed: 14 knots (26 km/h; 16 mph)
- Passengers: 150 second-class; 1,700 third-class
- Armament: 4 x 6 inches (15 cm) guns (as merchant ship, 1914)
- Notes: served as a decoy ship meant to resemble HMS Tiger

SS Merion was an ocean liner built in 1902 for the American Line, a subsidiary line of the International Mercantile Marine (IMM). She also sailed for the Red Star Line and the Dominion Line—both subsidiary lines of IMM—during her passenger career. After the outbreak of World War I she was bought by the British Admiralty and converted to serve as a decoy resembling the Royal Navy battlecruiser HMS Tiger. In May 1915, while posing as Tiger in the Aegean Sea, Merion was sunk by the German submarine SM UB-8.

== Career ==
Merion was built by John Brown & Company of Clydebank, Scotland for the American Line, a subsidiary of the International Navigation Company, and launched on 26 November 1901. The ship was 161.7 metres (530 ft 6 in) long (between perpendiculars) and 18.0 metres (59 ft 1 in) abeam. She had a gross register tonnage (GRT) of 11,621. The ship had twin screw propellers powered by twin triple-expansion steam engines, and, at top speed, could move 14 knots (26 km/h; 16 mph). As built, Merion had accommodations for 150 second- and 1,700 third-class passengers. Merion was named after a suburb of Philadelphia, Pennsylvania, as was her sister ship, SS Haverford. The towns were home to Clement Griscom, Director of the International Navigation Company.

Upon completion, the ship was chartered to the Dominion Line, a subsidiary line of International Mercantile Marine (IMM) with which International Navigation had merged in 1902. The liner sailed for Dominion on her maiden voyage on 8 March 1902 from Liverpool to Boston. After completing eleven voyages on that route, Merion was returned to the American Line in March 1903. The following month she began sailing on the Liverpool–Philadelphia route on which she sailed most of the rest of her passenger career. She was briefly chartered to the Red Star Line in 1907 for one Antwerp–New York voyage.

The liner had several mishaps during her passenger career. On 2 March 1903, an article in The Washington Post reported that Merion had run aground shortly after leaving Queenstown while en route to Liverpool from Boston. The ship was freed from her perch near Chicago Knoll by the rising tide, but when she got underway again became stuck fast in almost the same spot. At press time, two British Admiralty tugs had been dispatched to free the ship. Almost exactly a year later, Merion collided with the steamer Clan Grant off Tuskar Rock on 30 March 1904 and was damaged. On 24 December 1912, Merion collided with a tanker off the Delaware coast and sustained damage which included two flooded compartments. The ship was beached below Cross Ledge, but was refloated and made way under her own power back to Philadelphia, after discharging her cargo and passengers.

After the outbreak of World War I in Europe, Merion was equipped with four 6-inch (150 mm) guns for defensive purposes. Merion was the subject of a protest by the German Consul at Philadelphia, when she docked at that port equipped with those guns, counter to rules regarding armed ships in neutral ports. The still-neutral United States required that the guns be removed before they would allow Merion to sail; (Note: The United States did not enter World War I until April 1917.) her guns were stowed belowdecks when she departed Philadelphia on 5 September 1914. Merion's final voyage on the Liverpool–Philadelphia route began on 31 October, after which she was sold to the British Admiralty.

Merion was employed as part of a program that disguised ocean liners to resemble Royal Navy capital ships. Merion was patterned after the British battlecruiser HMS Tiger and deployed in the Mediterranean. (Note: The real HMS Tiger was a part of the British Grand Fleet and not in the Mediterranean. See: Cropley, Ralph E. (April 1918). "Only the Naval Reserve". The Atlantic Monthly. p. 439..) For this duty, the liner was equipped with canvas-and-wood replicas of Tiger's guns, and her crew had to stow them whenever approached by neutral ships. The ship was also overloaded with ballast to make the ship ride lower in the water to match the profile of the real Tiger.

On 29 May 1915, the German submarine UB-8, apparently tempted by the prospect of sinking a British battlecruiser, allowed five loaded transports to sail past before launching a torpedo attack on Merion. One torpedo from UB-8 struck the liner and exploded, sending some of the "cement and stones" used as ballast into the air. Some of Merion's crew that were knocked overboard by the explosion were able to float ashore on nearby Strati Island on remnants of the liner's false guns. Despite being severely overloaded, Merion did not immediately sink, remaining afloat more than 24 hours before finally succumbing to the attack on 31 May. Four crew were killed during Merion's sinking.

== Bibliography ==
- Bonsor, N. R. P. (1978) [1955]. North Atlantic Seaway (Enlarged and completely revised ed.). Saint Brélade, Jersey: Brookside Publications. ISBN 0-905824-01-6. OCLC 29930159.
