= Belgenland (1878 ship) =

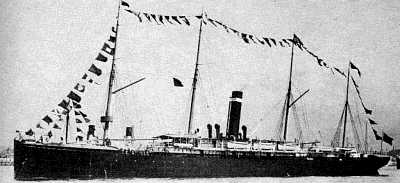
- Belgenland rigged as a schooner and dressed overall

History
- Name: 1878: Belgenland; 1905: Venere
- Namesake: 1878: Belgium; 1905: Venus
- Owner: 1879: SA de Nav Belgo-Américaine; 1903: Int'l Mercantile Marine Co; 1904: SA de Nav Belgo-Américaine; 1905: L Donegani
- Operator: 1879: Red Star Line; 1895: American Line; 1903: Red Star Line
- Port of registry: 1879: (Belgium) Antwerp; 1903: (United Kingdom of Great Britain and Ireland) Liverpool; 1904: (Belgium) Antwerp; 1905: (Kingdom of Italy) Livorno
- Route: 1879: Antwerp – Philadelphia; 1895: Liverpool – Philadelphia; 1903: Antwerp – Philadelphia
- Builder: Barrow Shipbuilding Co, Barrow
- Yard number: 59
- Launched: 24 December 1878
- Completed: 1879
- Maiden voyage: 20 May 1879
- Identification: UK official number 115353; UK code letters TSRF
- Fate: Scrapped 1905

General characteristics
- Type: Ocean liner
- Tonnage: 1881: 3,453 GRT, 2,364 NRT; 1896: 3,873 GRT, 2,678 NRT; 1904: 3,682 GRT, 2,603 NRT
- Length: 402.9 ft (122.8 m)
- Beam: 40.2 ft (12.3 m)
- Depth: 30.6 ft (9.3 m)
- Decks: 3
- Installed power: 1881: 600 HP; 1896: 444 NHP
- Propulsion: compound steam engine
- Capacity: 1895: 150 2nd class and 1,000 third class passengers
- Notes: iron hull, 4 masts

Belgenland was an iron-hulled sail-steamer that was launched in England in 1878 and spent most of her career as a Belgian transatlantic ocean liner. She was renamed Venere in 1904 and scrapped in Italy in 1905.

== Building ==
Barrow Shipbuilding Co built Belgenland in Barrow-in-Furness, Lancashire as yard number 59. She was launched on 24 December 1878 and completed in 1879. Her registered length was 402.9 ft (122.8 m), her beam was 40.2 ft (12.3 m) and her depth was 30.6 ft (9.3 m). As built, her tonnages were 3,453 GRT and 2,364 NRT.

Belgenland had four masts. At different times she was rigged as a jackass-barque and a schooner. She also had a two-cylinder compound steam engine, which was rated at 444 NHP. She had a single funnel.

The ship was built for Société Anonyme de Navigation Belgo-Américaine, who registered her in Antwerp and appointed Red Star Line to manage her.

== Belgenland ==
On 30 March 1879 Belgenland left Antwerp on her maiden voyage to Philadelphia. Her last voyage on this route was on 6 July 1895.

In 1895 American Line chartered Belgenland, and had her reclassified to carry 150 second-class and 1,000 third-class passengers. Her tonnages were revised to 3,873 GRT and 2,678 NRT. On 31 July 1895 she began her first voyage on her new route, which was between Philadelphia and Liverpool. She began her last voyage on this route on 17 October 1903.

In 1903 American Line returned Belgenland to her owners, who changed her port of registration to Liverpool. She was given the UK official number 115353 and code letters TSRF. She was reclassified for third class passengers only, and Red Star Line put her back on the route between Antwerp and Philadelphia.

In 1904 Belgenland's port of registration was changed back to Antwerp. She began her last voyage between Antwerp and Philadelphia on 7 December 1904.

== Venere ==
L Donegani, an Italian shipowner, bought Belgenland, renamed her Venere, and registered her in Livorno. Her tonnages were revised to 3,682 GRT and 2,603 NRT. She was scrapped in September 1905 in Genoa.

== Bibliography ==
- Bonsor, NRP (1975). North Atlantic Seaway. Vol. 2. Jersey: Brookside Publications. p. 850. ISBN 978-0905824017.
- Lloyd's Register of British and Foreign Shipping. London: Lloyd's Register of Shipping. 1881 – via Internet Archive.
- Lloyd's Register of British and Foreign Shipping. Vol. I–Steamers. London: Lloyd's Register of Shipping. 1896 – via Internet Archive.
- "Supplement". Lloyd's Register of Shipping. Vol. I–Steamers. London: Lloyd's Register of Shipping. 1904 – via Internet Archive.
- Lloyd's Register of Shipping. Vol. I–Steamers. London: Lloyd's Register of Shipping. 1905 – via Internet Archive.
- Mercantile Navy List. 1904 – via Crew List Index Project.
