= SM UB-8 =

German Type UB I-class submarine

- SM UB-8

History

German Empire
- Name: UB-8
- Ordered: 15 October 1914
- Builder: Germaniawerft, Kiel
- Yard number: 246
- Laid down: 4 December 1914
- Launched: April 1915
- Commissioned: 23 April 1915
- Fate: Sold to Bulgaria, 25 May 1916

Service record as UB-8
- Part of: Pola Flotilla; 23 May – 4 June 1915; Constantinople Flotilla; 4 June 1915 – 25 May 1916
- Commanders: Oblt. Ernst von Voigt; 23 May 1915 – 15 May 1916
- Operations: 14 patrols
- Victories: 5 merchant ships sunk (19,796 GRT)

Bulgaria
- Name: Podvodnik No. 18; Bulgarian: Подводник №18
- Acquired: purchased 25 May 1916
- Commissioned: 25 May 1916
- Fate: Surrendered to France, broken up at Bizerta, August 1921

Service record as Podvodnik No. 18
- Part of: Bulgarian Navy
- Commanders: Nikola Todorov; Ivan Variklechkov

General characteristics
- Class & type: Type UB I submarine
- Displacement: 127 t (125 long tons) surfaced; 142 t (140 long tons) submerged
- Length: 28.10 m (92 ft 2 in) (o/a)
- Beam: 3.15 m (10 ft 4 in)
- Draft: 3.03 m (9 ft 11 in)
- Propulsion: 1 × propeller shaft; 1 × Daimler 4-cylinder diesel engine, 59 bhp (44 kW); 1 × Siemens-Schuckert electric motor, 119 shp (89 kW)
- Speed: 6.47 knots (11.98 km/h; 7.45 mph) surfaced; 5.51 knots (10.20 km/h; 6.34 mph) submerged
- Range: 1,650 nmi (3,060 km; 1,900 mi) at 5 knots (9.3 km/h; 5.8 mph) surfaced; 45 nmi (83 km; 52 mi) at 4 knots (7.4 km/h; 4.6 mph)
- Test depth: 50 metres (160 ft)
- Complement: 14
- Armament: 2 × 45 cm (17.7 in) bow torpedo tubes; 2 × torpedoes; 1 × 8 mm (0.31 in) machine gun
- Notes: 33-second diving time

SM UB-8 was a German Type UB I submarine or U-boat in the German Imperial Navy (German: Kaiserliche Marine) during World War I. She was sold to Bulgaria in 1916 and renamed Podvodnik No. 18 (Bulgarian: Подводник №18), and was the first ever Bulgarian submarine.

UB-8 was ordered in October 1914 and was laid down at the AG Weser shipyard in Bremen in November. UB-8 was a little under 28 metres (92 ft) in length and displaced between 127 and 141 tonnes (125 and 139 long tons), depending on whether surfaced or submerged. She carried two torpedoes for her two bow torpedo tubes and was also armed with a deck-mounted machine gun. UB-8 was originally one of a pair of UB I boats sent to the Austro-Hungarian Navy to replace an Austrian pair to be sent to the Dardanelles, and was broken into sections and shipped by rail to Pola in March 1915 for reassembly. She was launched and commissioned as SM UB-8 in the German Imperial Navy in April when the Austrians opted out of the agreement. (Note: "SM" stands for "Seiner Majestät" (English: His Majesty's) and combined with the U for Unterseeboot would be translated as His Majesty's Submarine.)

Although briefly a part of the Pola Flotilla at commissioning, UB-8 spent the majority of her German career patrolling the Black Sea as part of the Constantinople Flotilla. The U-boat sank only one ship, SS Merion, was disguised by the British Admiralty as a Royal Navy battlecruiser as part of a decoy operation. In October, she helped repel a Russian bombardment of Bulgaria.

In May 1916, the submarine was transferred to the Bulgarian Navy as Podvodnik No. 18 and commissioned in a ceremony that was attended by Crown Prince Boris and Prince Kiril. In Bulgarian service, the submarine patrolled the Bulgarian Black Sea coast and had encounters with Russian vessels on several occasions. After the war ended, the submarine was surrendered to France in February 1919 and scrapped at Bizerta in August 1921. However, in July 2011 Viceadmiral Manushev, Commander of the Bulgarian Navy, announced that the submarine, discovered in 2010 at the sea bottom near the town of Varna, is UB-8. Divers discovered manufacturer numbers and according to them the identity is confirmed.

== Design and construction ==
After the German Army's rapid advance along the North Sea coast in the earliest stages of World War I, the German Imperial Navy found itself without suitable submarines that could be operated in the narrow and shallow seas off Flanders. Project 34, a design effort begun in mid-August 1914, produced the Type UB I design: a small submarine that could be shipped by rail to a port of operations and quickly assembled. Constrained by railroad size limitations, the UB I design called for a boat about 28 metres (92 ft) long and displacing about 125 tonnes (123 long tons) with two torpedo tubes. (Note: A further refinement of the design—replacing the torpedo tubes with mine chutes but changing little else—evolved into the Type UC I coastal minelaying submarine. See: Miller, p. 458.) UB-8 was last boat of the initial allotment of eight submarines—numbered from UB-1—ordered on 15 October from Germaniawerft of Kiel, just shy of two months after planning for the class began.

UB-8 was laid down by Germaniawerft in Kiel on 4 December. As built, UB-8 was 28.10 metres (92 ft 2 in) long, 3.15 metres (10 ft 4 in) abeam, and had a draft of 3.03 metres (9 ft 11 in). She had a single 59-brake-horsepower (44 kW) Daimler 4-cylinder diesel engine for surface travel, and a single 119-shaft-horsepower (89 kW) Siemens-Schuckert electric motor for underwater travel, both attached to a single propeller shaft. Her top speeds were 6.47 knots (11.98 km/h; 7.45 mph), surfaced, and 5.51 knots (10.20 km/h; 6.34 mph), submerged. At more moderate speeds, she could sail up to 1,650 nautical miles (3,060 km; 1,900 mi) on the surface before refueling, and up to 45 nautical miles (83 km; 52 mi) submerged before recharging her batteries. Like all boats of the class, UB-8 was rated to a diving depth of 50 metres (160 ft), and could completely submerge in 33 seconds.

UB-8 was armed with two 45-centimeter (17.7 in) torpedoes in two bow torpedo tubes. She was also outfitted for a single 8-millimeter (0.31 in) machine gun on deck. UB-8's standard complement consisted of one officer and thirteen enlisted men.

While UB-8's construction neared completion in early March 1915, Enver Pasha and other Turkish leaders were pleading with their German and Austro-Hungarian allies to send submarines to the Dardanelles to help attack the British and French fleet pounding Turkish positions. The Germans induced the Austro-Hungarian Navy (German: Kaiserliche und Königliche Kriegsmarine or K.u.K. Kriegsmarine) to send two boats—its own Germaniawerft-built boats U-3 and U-4—with the promise of UB-7 and UB-8 as replacements.

When work on UB-7 and UB-8 was complete at the Germaniwerft yard, they were both readied for rail shipment. The process of shipping a UB I boat involved breaking the submarine down into what was essentially a knock down kit. Each boat was broken into approximately fifteen pieces and loaded onto eight railway flatcars. The boats were ready for shipment to the main Austrian naval base at Pola on 15 March, despite the fact that the Austrian pair was still not ready. German engineers and technicians that accompanied the German boats to Pola worked under the supervision of Kapitänleutnant Hans Adam, head of the newly created U-boat special command (German: Sonderkommando). Typically, the UB I assembly process took about two to three weeks, and, accordingly, UB-8 was launched at Pola sometime in April.

== German career ==
During her trials, UB-8 was assigned the Austrian number of U-8 and an Austrian commander. Her German crew at Pola—since it was still the intent for UB-8 to be transferred to the K.u.K. Kriegsmarine—wore either civilian clothes or Austrian uniforms. As time dragged on, the Austrian U-3 and U-4 were still not ready, (Note: The Austrian U-3 had developed a leak and was undergoing repairs that eventually kept her at Pola until 27 April. See: "Tengeralattjárók" (PDF) (in Hungarian). Imperial and Royal Navy Association. p. 3. Archived from the original (PDF) on 11 October 2021.) and eventually Admiral Anton Haus, the head of the Austro-Hungarian Navy, reneged on his commitment because of the overt hostility from neighbor and former ally Italy. (Note: Italy declared war on Austria-Hungary on 23 May 1915.)

With the change of heart from the Austrians, Germany resolved to retain UB-8 and send her to the aid of the Turks. So, the boat was commissioned into the German Imperial Navy as SM UB-8 on 23 April under the command of Kapitänleutnant Ernst von Voigt, a 27-year-old first-time U-boat commander. At commissioning, the boat temporarily joined the Pola Flotilla (German: Deutsche U-Halbflotille Pola).

Because of her limited range, UB-8 would not have been able to make the entire journey to Turkey, so on 2 May, she was towed by the Austrian cruiser SMS Novara from Pola down the Adriatic and through the Straits of Otranto. The duo continued until spotted by French forces near Kefalonia. UB-8 slipped the tow and Novara raced back into the Adriatic without incident. (Note: UB-7 was similarly towed by the Austrian destroyer SMS Triglav two weeks later.) Two days after her departure, UB-8 was running on the surface when the stern of the boat suddenly dropped. The watch officer, on the conning tower with the helmsman and a lookout, was able to partially close the hatch before the entire submarine slipped below the waves, depositing the three men in the water. On board the submarine, water continued to pour in through the hatch and the boat was sinking by the stern. Voigt ordered the interior hatch to the control room sealed and all the ballast tanks filled with compressed air to increase buoyancy. The tactic returned UB-8 to the surface where the boat's diesel engines were restarted. Voigt circled back for the missing crewmen but only the watch officer and helmsman were recovered; the lookout had drowned.

On 29 May 1915, UB-8 came upon an Allied convoy near Lemnos, and, enticed by the prospect of hitting what he identified as the Royal Navy battlecruiser HMS Tiger, Voigt allowed five fully laden transport ships to pass unmolested. When he had a clear shot, Voigt launched one of his torpedoes at the stationary ship and hit it, sending debris into the air. Unfortunately for Voigt and UB-8, they had in fact torpedoed the British ocean liner SS Merion, which was a participant in an Admiralty plan to disguise large liners as Royal Navy capital ships. (Note: The real HMS Tiger was a part of the British Grand Fleet and not in the Mediterranean. See: Cropley, Ralph E. (April 1918). "Only the Naval Reserve". The Atlantic Monthly. p. 439..) Merion, which eventually sank on 31 May, had been outfitted with wood and canvas "guns" and overloaded with cement and stones to approximate the profile of Tiger. There are no reports of any deaths during Merion's sinking.

On 4 June, UB-8 became the first submarine in the new Constantinople Flotilla (German: U-boote der Mittelmeer division in Konstantinopel) based in Constantinople (present-day Istanbul). Despite German intentions to use her in the Dardanelles, UB-8 was ineffective because she was hampered by her limited torpedo supply and her weak engines, which made negotiating the strong currents there nearly impossible. Because of this, UB-8 was sent to patrol in the Black Sea, where she was active by late July.

On 12 August, UB-8 fired a torpedo at HMS Manica from 500 yards, which passed under Manica's shallow draught, the submarine was then sighted outside net, two torpedoes fired and missed Manica, which hit the net at an acute angle and burst. An attack two days later on similar vessels was also unsuccessful.

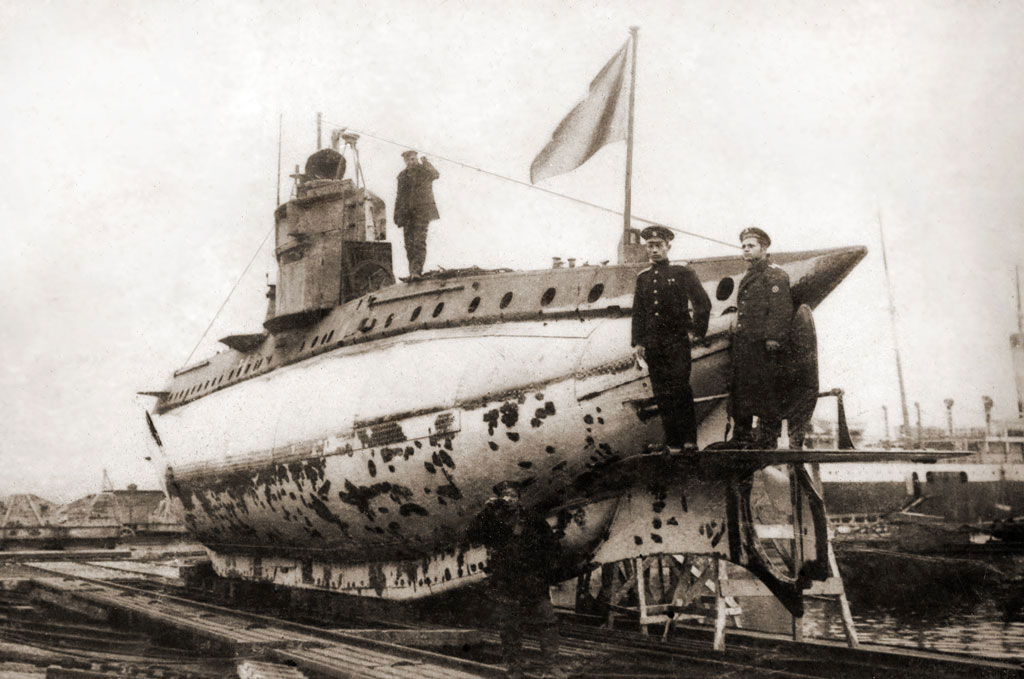
Podvodnik No. 18/Подводник 18

In September, UB-7 and UB-8 were sent to Varna, Bulgaria, and from there, to patrol off the Russian Black Sea coast. Because Bulgaria had joined the Central Powers, battleships of the Russian Black Sea Fleet, and aircraft from the seaplane carriers Almaz and Imperator Nikolai I began attacks on Varna and the Bulgarian coast on 25 October. UB-7 and UB-8, both based out of Varna by this time, sortied to disrupt the bombardment. UB-8 was never able to launch any attacks, but UB-7 launched a torpedo at the Panteleimon (most well known under her former name of Potemkin), but it missed. Despite the lack of any success by either submarine, their presence did cause the Russians to break off their attacks and withdraw.

In early 1916, UB-7 and UB-8 were still cruising in the Black Sea out of Varna. The Germans did not have good luck in the Black Sea, which was not a priority for them. The Bulgarians, who saw the value of the submarines in repelling Russian attacks, began negotiations to purchase UB-7 and UB-8. Bulgarian sailors practiced in the pair of boats and technicians were sent to Kiel for training at the German submarine school there. The transfer of UB-8 to the Bulgarian Navy took place on 25 May 1916, but for reasons unreported in sources, UB-7 remained under the German flag.

== Bulgarian career ==
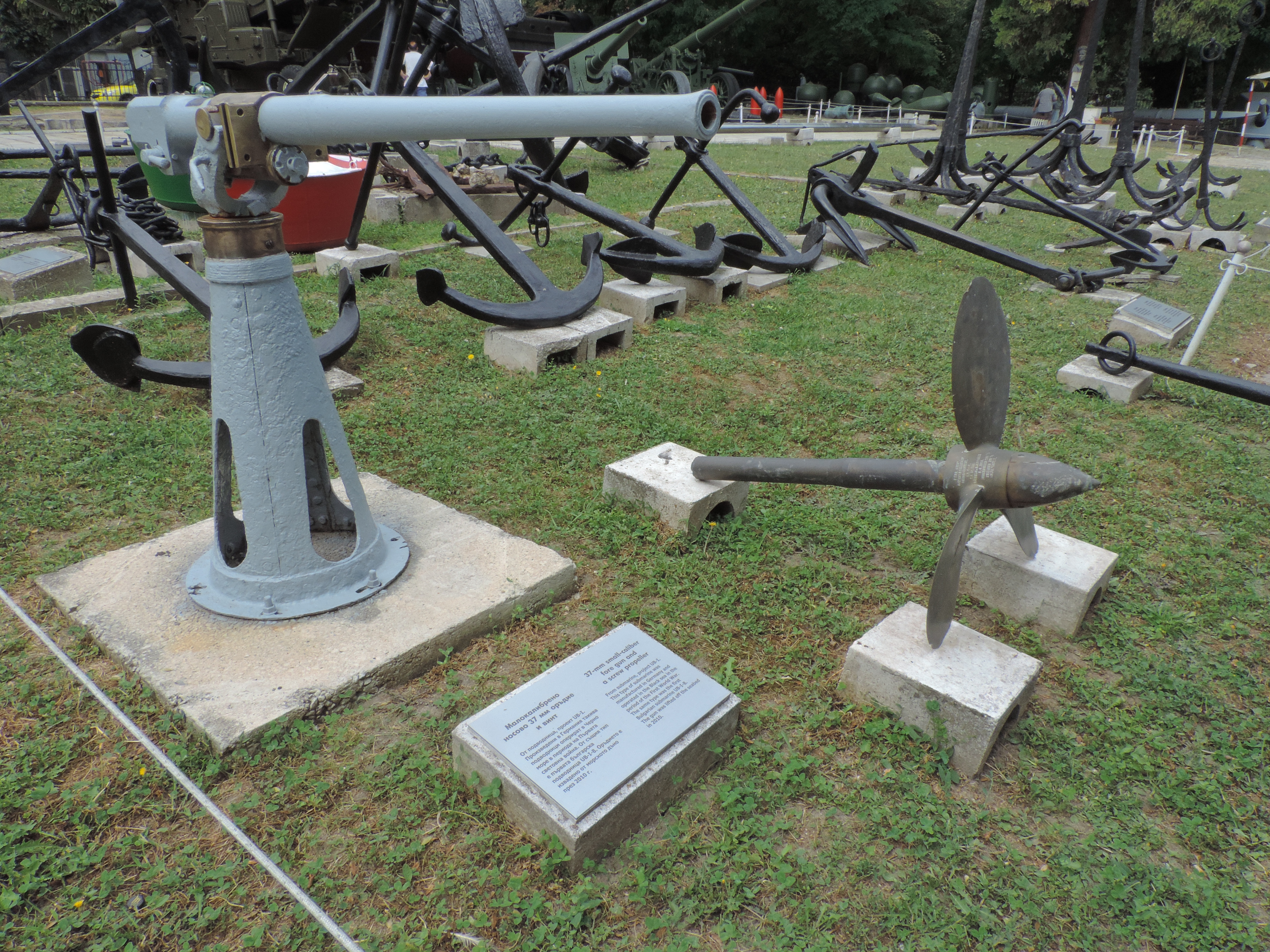
A 47 mm from the UB-8 on display at the Naval Museum Varna Bulgaria.

Upon acceptance of UB-8 by the Bulgarian Navy, she was renamed Podvodnik No. 18 (in Cyrillic: Подводник №18). Although the commissioning ceremony for Podvodnik No. 18 was kept out of newspapers, it was attended by Crown Prince Boris and his brother Prince Kiril, who both boarded the submarine for a ceremonial first voyage to Euxinograd, the Bulgarian summer palace located just north of Varna. In Bulgarian service, the submarine was armed with a 47-millimeter (1.9 in) deck gun that supplemented its machine gun.

Podvodnik No. 18's first patrol under the Bulgarian flag took place on 4 and 5 July 1916 when she sailed to Cape Shabla and Mangalia. The submarine was used for reconnaissance and coastal defense, and patrolled a regular route. This route was a loop that began in Varna and went northward to Kaliakra, Mangalia, and Constanţa; then southward to Burgas, and Sozopol; then ended at Varna. On 6 September, she had an encounter with the Russian destroyers Bystry and Gromki, drove off Russian submarines on other occasions, and on 16 December helped turn back a Russian sortie against Balchik. After the Russian withdrawal from World War I in 1917, Podvodnik No. 18's activities were greatly reduced.

After the end of the war, Podvodnik No. 18 was surrendered to the French on 23 February 1919. Towed to Bizerta, she was scrapped after August 1921.

== Summary of raiding history ==
Ships sunk or damaged by SM UB-8
Date	Name	Nationality	Tonnage	Fate
29 May 1915	Merion	Royal Navy	19,380	Sunk
9 September 1915	Benefactor	Russian Empire	85	Sunk
9 September 1915	Obedient	Russian Empire	121	Sunk
9 September 1915	Employee	Russian Empire	102	Sunk
11 September 1915	Melitina	Russian Empire	108	Sunk
		Total:	19,796	

== Bibliography ==
- Bendert, Harald (2000). Die UB-Boote der Kaiserlichen Marine, 1914-1918. Einsätze, Erfolge, Schicksal (in German). Hamburg: Verlag E.S. Mittler & Sohn GmbH. ISBN 3-8132-0713-7.
- Gröner, Erich; Jung, Dieter; Maass, Martin (1991). U-boats and Mine Warfare Vessels. German Warships 1815–1945. Vol. 2. Translated by Thomas, Keith; Magowan, Rachel. London: Conway Maritime Press. ISBN 0-85177-593-4.
- Bonsor, N. R. P. (1978) [1955]. North Atlantic Seaway (Enlarged and completely revised ed.). Saint Brélade, Jersey: Brookside Publications. ISBN 0-905824-01-6. OCLC 29930159.
- Gardiner, Robert; Gray, Randal, eds. (1985). Conway's All the World's Fighting Ships 1906–1921. Annapolis, Maryland: Naval Institute Press. ISBN 978-0-87021-907-8. OCLC 12119866.
- Gibson, R. H.; Maurice Prendergast (2003) [1931]. The German Submarine War, 1914–1918. Annapolis, Maryland: Naval Institute Press. ISBN 9781591143147. OCLC 52924732.
- Grant, Robert M. (2002) [1964]. U-boats Destroyed: The Effect of Anti-submarine Warfare, 1914–1918. Penzance: Periscope Publishing. ISBN 978-1-904381-00-6. OCLC 50215640.
- Йорданов, Николай (1999). Първата българска подводница ("The First Bulgarian Submarine") (in Bulgarian). Vol. кн. 3. София: Военно-исторически сборник. pp. 130–145.
- Karau, Mark D. (2003). Wielding the Dagger: the MarineKorps Flandern and the German War Effort, 1914–1918. Westport, Connecticut: Praeger. ISBN 978-0-313-32475-8. OCLC 51204317.
- Koburger, Charles W. (2001). The Central Powers in the Adriatic, 1914–1918: War in a Narrow Sea. Westport, Connecticut: Praeger. ISBN 978-0-275-97071-0. OCLC 44550580.
- Messimer, Dwight R. (2002). Verschollen: World War I U-boat losses. Annapolis, Maryland: Naval Institute Press. ISBN 978-1-55750-475-3. OCLC 231973419.
- Miller, David (2002). The Illustrated Directory of Submarines of the World. St. Paul, Minnesota: MBI Pub. Co. ISBN 978-0-7603-1345-9. OCLC 50208951.
- Sondhaus, Lawrence (1994). The Naval Policy of Austria-Hungary, 1867–1918: Navalism, Industrial Development, and the Politics of Dualism. West Lafayette, Indiana: Purdue University Press. ISBN 978-1-55753-034-9. OCLC 59919233.
- Tarrant, V. E. (1989). The U-Boat Offensive: 1914–1945. Annapolis, Maryland: Naval Institute Press. ISBN 978-0-87021-764-7. OCLC 20338385.
- Williamson, Gordon (2002). U-boats of the Kaiser's Navy. Oxford: Osprey. ISBN 978-1-84176-362-0. OCLC 48627495.
