= SS Westernland (1883) =

Belgian ocean liner

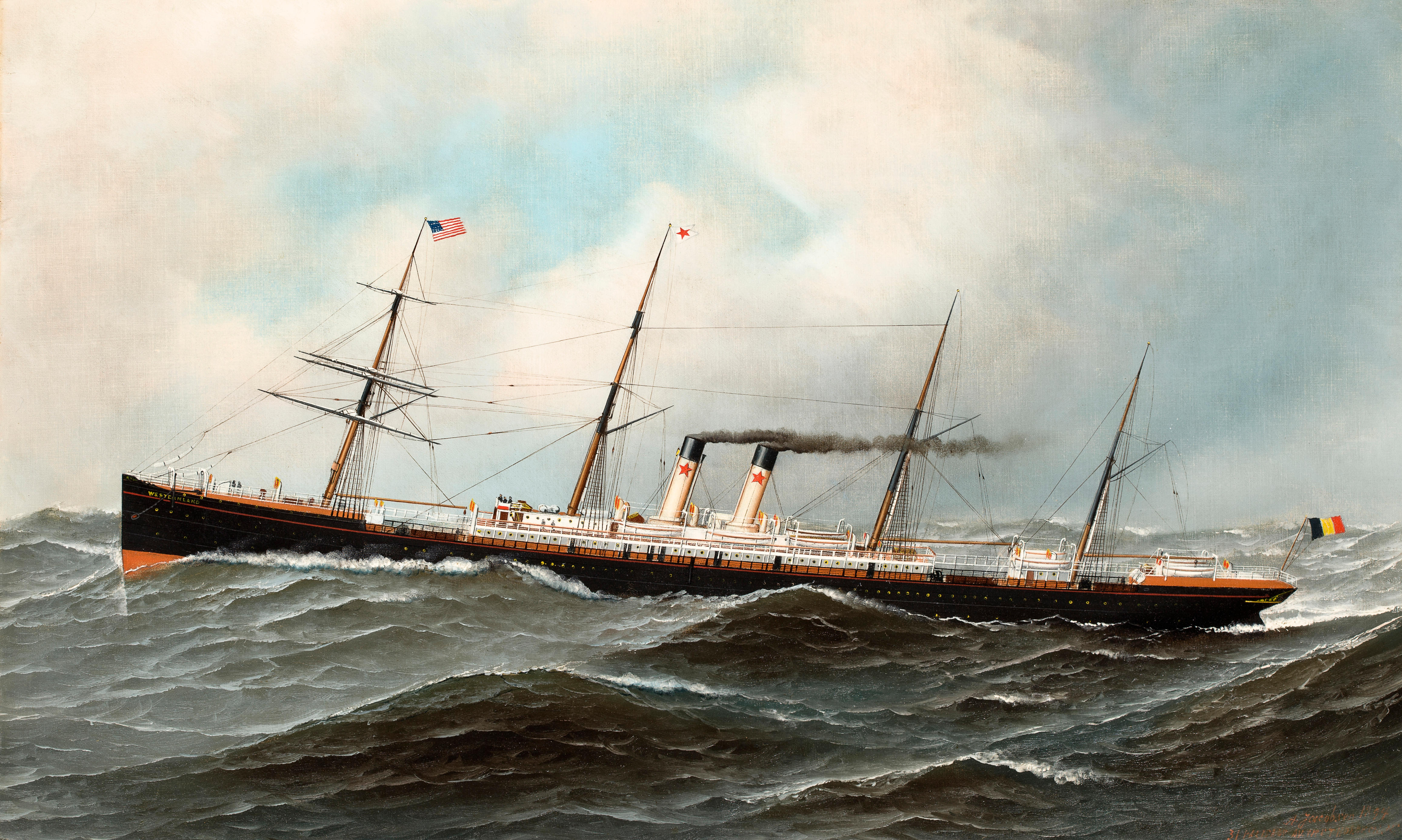
- Painting of the ship in 1894, by Antonio Jacobsen

History

Belgium
- Name: SS Westernland
- Owner: Red Star Line
- Operator: Red Star Line
- Port of registry: Antwerp
- Route: Antwerp–New York
- Builder: Laird Brothers Limited, Birkenhead
- Yard number: 509
- Laid down: 1883
- Launched: 4 August 1883
- Maiden voyage: 3 November 1883
- Fate: Transferred to American Line 1901

History

United States
- Name: SS Westernland
- Owner: American Line
- Operator: American Line
- Port of registry: Liverpool
- Route: Liverpool–Philadelphia
- Acquired: March 1901
- Fate: Transferred to Red Star Line 1906

History

Belgium
- Name: SS Westernland
- Owner: Red Star Line
- Operator: Red Star Line
- Port of registry: Antwerp
- Route: Antwerp–New York
- Acquired: March 1906
- Fate: Sold to Italy 1910

History

Italy
- Name: SS Land
- Owner: L. Pittaluga
- Port of registry: Genoa
- Acquired: 1910
- Fate: Scrapped 1910

General characteristics
- Tonnage: 5,708 GRT
- Length: 440 feet (130 m)
- Beam: 47.2 feet (14.4 m)
- Depth: 35.3 feet (10.8 m)
- Installed power: Single compound steam engine, 640 NHP
- Propulsion: Single propeller, sails
- Speed: 14.5 knots

SS Westernland was an ocean liner built in 1883 by for the Red Star Line, and was the company's first steel-hulled ship. She operated for 26 years before being scrapped in 1910.

== Design and construction ==
Westernland was built in Birkenhead by Laird Brothers, and was launched on 4 August 1883. She was fitted with Scotch marine boilers powering a single compound steam engine as her primary means of propulsion, notably using the largest piston that had ever been made, but also carried sails on her four masts for auxiliary power. Westernland was the first Red Star Liner to be constructed from steel rather than iron, and was also the first in the company's fleet to sport twin funnels.

== Career ==
Westernland sailed on her maiden voyage between Antwerp and New York City on 3 November 1883. In March 1901, she was transferred to the American Line, which operated her on the company's Liverpool–Philadelphia service for six years before being transferred back to the Red Star Line's Antwerp–New York service in March 1906. Westernland was sold to L. Pittaluga for scrapping in early 1910, and was renamed Land for her final voyage to Genoa, where she arrived on March 9.
