= Eugeen Van Mieghem =

18th-19th century Belgian artist (1875–1930)

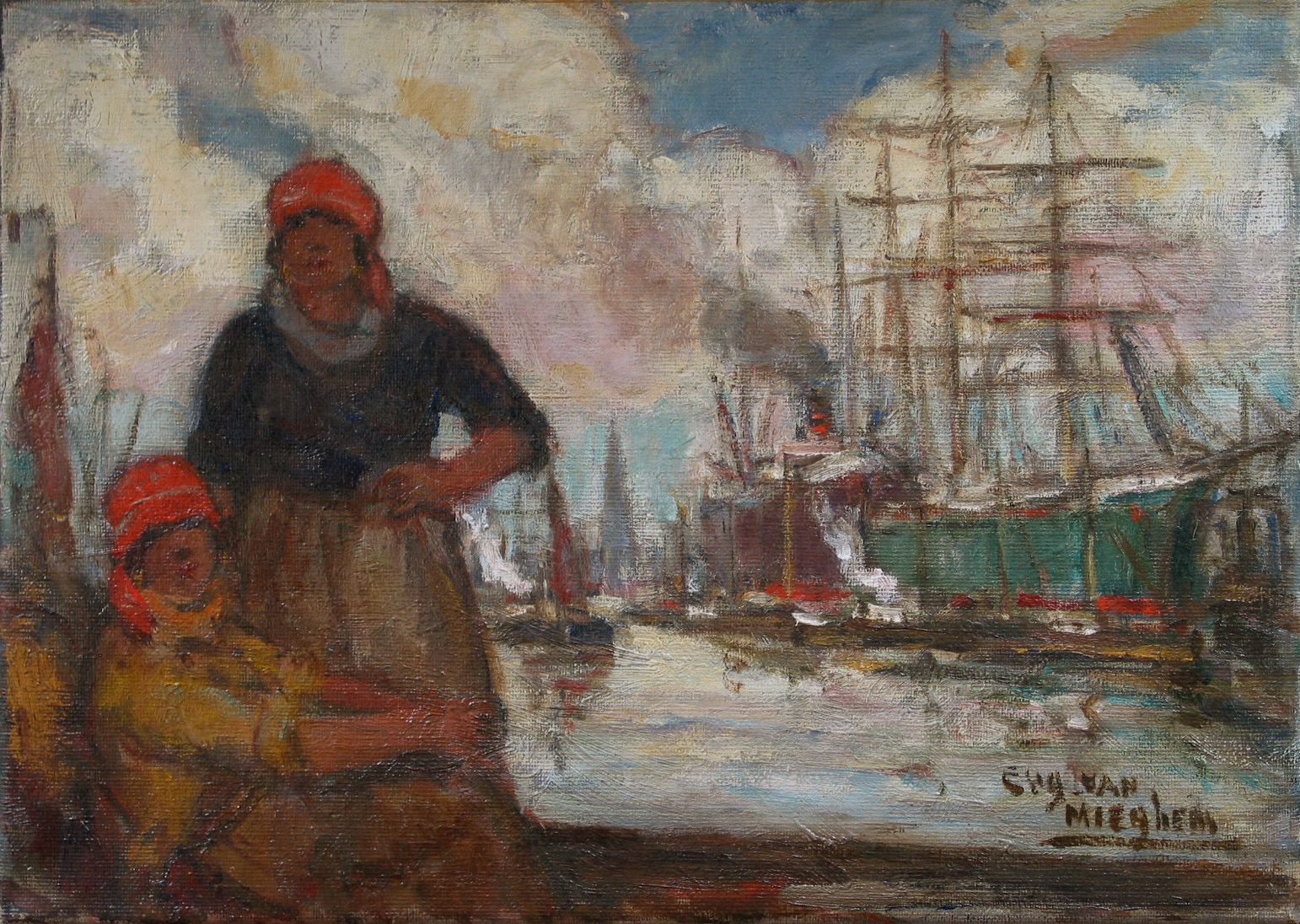
- Women of the docks (Antwerp), Eugeen van Mieghem, Oil on canvas
- Born: 1 October 1875; Antwerp, Flanders, Belgium
- Died: 24 March 1930 (aged 54); Antwerp, Flanders, Belgium
- Known for: Painting

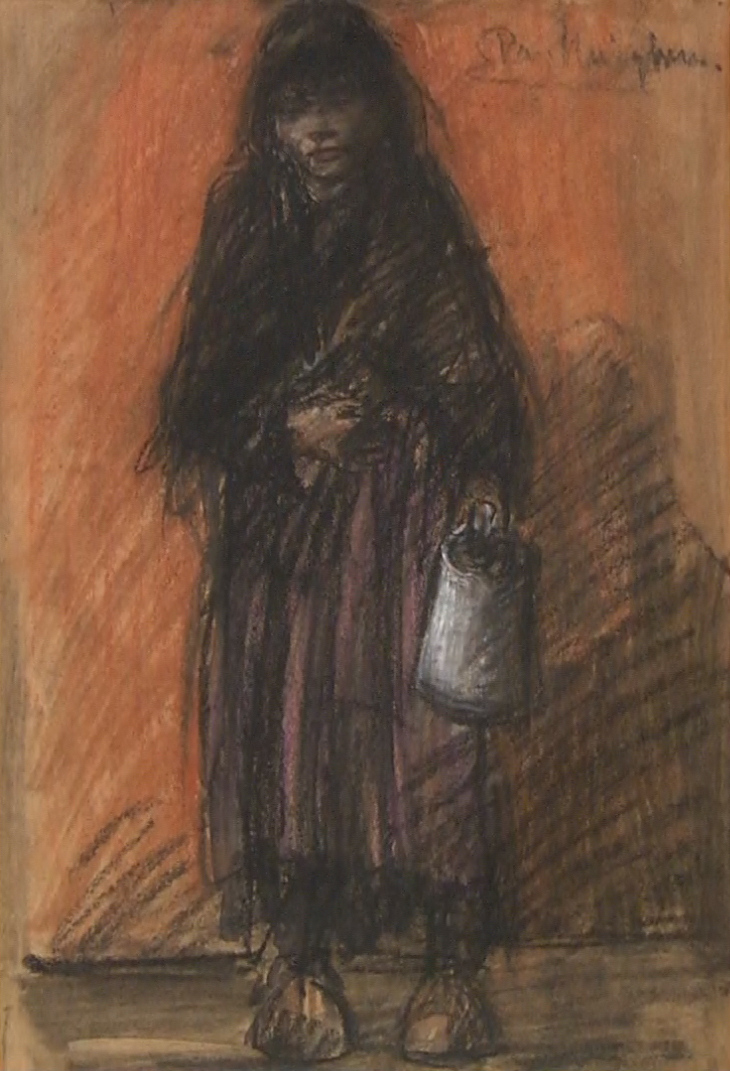
Het Soepmeisje ("The Soup Girl", 1901)

Eugeen Van Mieghem (Dutch pronunciation: [ˈøːɣeːɱ vɑ ˈmiɣəm]; 1 October 1875 – 24 March 1930) was an artist born in the port city of Antwerp, Belgium. As a boy Van Mieghem was confronted with the harsh reality of life at the waterfront.

Even at primary school he showed a talent for drawing. He was introduced to the work of Vincent van Gogh, Georges Seurat, Camille Pissarro, Henri de Toulouse-Lautrec and others at an exhibition organised by Flemish painter and architect Henry van de Velde at the Antwerp Academy around 1892. He attended the Antwerp Academy but was sent from school because his conservative teachers disliked his subject matter and his free, spontaneous way with it. He threw his lot in with progressive political and cultural movements, and joined an anarchist group. By the early 1900s was recognized as one of the most promising young artists of the Antwerp school. He would never renounce his idealism. He became the artist of the typical harbour folk: sack porters, sack makers, emigrants, dockers, bargees, and tramps.

Van Mieghem had his first taste of real success at La Libre Esthétique in Brussels, where his pastels and drawings hung alongside works by French impressionists such as Claude Monet, Paul Cézanne, Camille Pissarro, Jean Renoir and Édouard Vuillard.

Van Mieghem married Augustine Pautre in 1902. At the end of November 1904 his young wife fell ill. Van Mieghem depicted her in an impressive series of drawings and pastels that rate alongside similar work by artists such as Rembrandt (The Series of Saskia) and Ferdinand Hodler (Valentine Godé). Grief-stricken at the death of his wife, it was not before 1910 until Van Mieghem showed his work again.

After his first individual exhibition at Antwerp's Royal Society of Fine Arts in 1912, international interest in his work mounted and group exhibitions followed in Cologne and The Hague. In March 1919 he showed his wartime work in Antwerp. This remarkable series of mainly drawings and pastels met with the wide approval of art critics, who compared this work to that of Théophile-Alexandre Steinlen, Jean-Louis Forain, and Käthe Kollwitz. After an article by his friend and Flemish author Willem Elsschot appeared, Van Mieghem was also able to show his wartime work in a gallery in Scheveningen in The Netherlands. In 1929 he became a teacher of life drawing at the Academy in Antwerp and he participated in exhibitions every year until his death in 1930.

In European social art of the turn of the century, international art critics compare his work to that of figures like Käthe Kollwitz, de Toulouse-Lautrec, and Steinlen. Van Mieghem had no equal when it came down to drawing and painting the lives of ordinary people, living and working in an international seaport. When it comes to capturing social reality, his work has much of the power and authenticity of Jean-François Millet's. Like the precursor of social art, Van Mieghem never had to leave his own environment in search of subjects. The world was on his doorstep.

In recent years Van Mieghem's work has been rediscovered internationally. In 2000 a Steinlen retrospective at the Picasso Museum in Barcelona included seven of his works and brought international recognition for his work. In 1993, the Eugeen Van Mieghem Museum opened its doors in Antwerp, with a collection of 150 of his works. In 2017 the Hugh Lane Gallery (Dublin, Ireland) exhibited several of his works.

== Sources ==
- P. & V. Berko, "Dictionary of Belgian painters born between 1750 & 1875", Knokke 1981, p. 712-713.
