= Red Star Line =

Defunct shipping line (1871–1935)

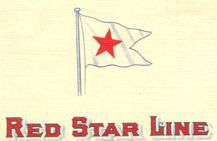
- Type: Joint venture
- Industry: Shipping, transportation
- Founded: 1871
- Defunct: 1935
- Fate: Assets sold
- Successor: Holland America Line
- Area served: Transatlantic

The Red Star Line was a shipping line founded in 1871 as a joint venture between the International Navigation Company of Philadelphia, which also ran the American Line, and the Société Anonyme de Navigation Belgo-Américaine of Antwerp, Belgium. The company's main ports of call were Antwerp in Belgium, Liverpool and Southampton in the United Kingdom and New York City and Philadelphia in the United States.

== History ==
The principal American organizer and general agent of INC was the shipbroking firm of Peter Wright & Sons, a Philadelphia import-export house. The company had established friendships and business ties with two prominent Belgian shipowners, Jules-Bernard von Der Becke and William Edouard Marsily. During the 1860s, the von Der Becke firm became an important importer of petroleum products from Pennsylvania to Antwerp in American and Belgian ships. Clement Griscom, who rose rapidly from clerk to partner at Peter Wright & Sons, was a leader in the firm's shipping affairs and the chief force behind the creation of both INN and the chief negotiator with Belgian's King Leopold, von Der Becke, and Marsily to establish a subsidiary company in Antwerp beginning on September 19, 1872, under the title "Societe Anonyme de Navigation Belge-Americaine" (Red Star Line). The agreement established the Red Star Line as the exclusive carrier of mail service out of Antwerp to Philadelphia and New York. This subsidiary would provide most of the company's profits for the next 30 years. The shipping line's home port was Antwerp and it sailed under the Belgian flag, thereby avoiding the obligation of employing far more expensive American personnel.

Clement Griscom led the enterprise from its founding until the International Mercantile Marine Co. took it over in 1902. Red Star Line survived IMM's financial crisis in 1915. In the 1930s Red Star Line was part of Arnold Bernstein Line.

The company declared bankruptcy in 1934. It operated until 1935 when it ceased trading. Its assets were eventually sold to the Holland America Line.

== Heritage ==
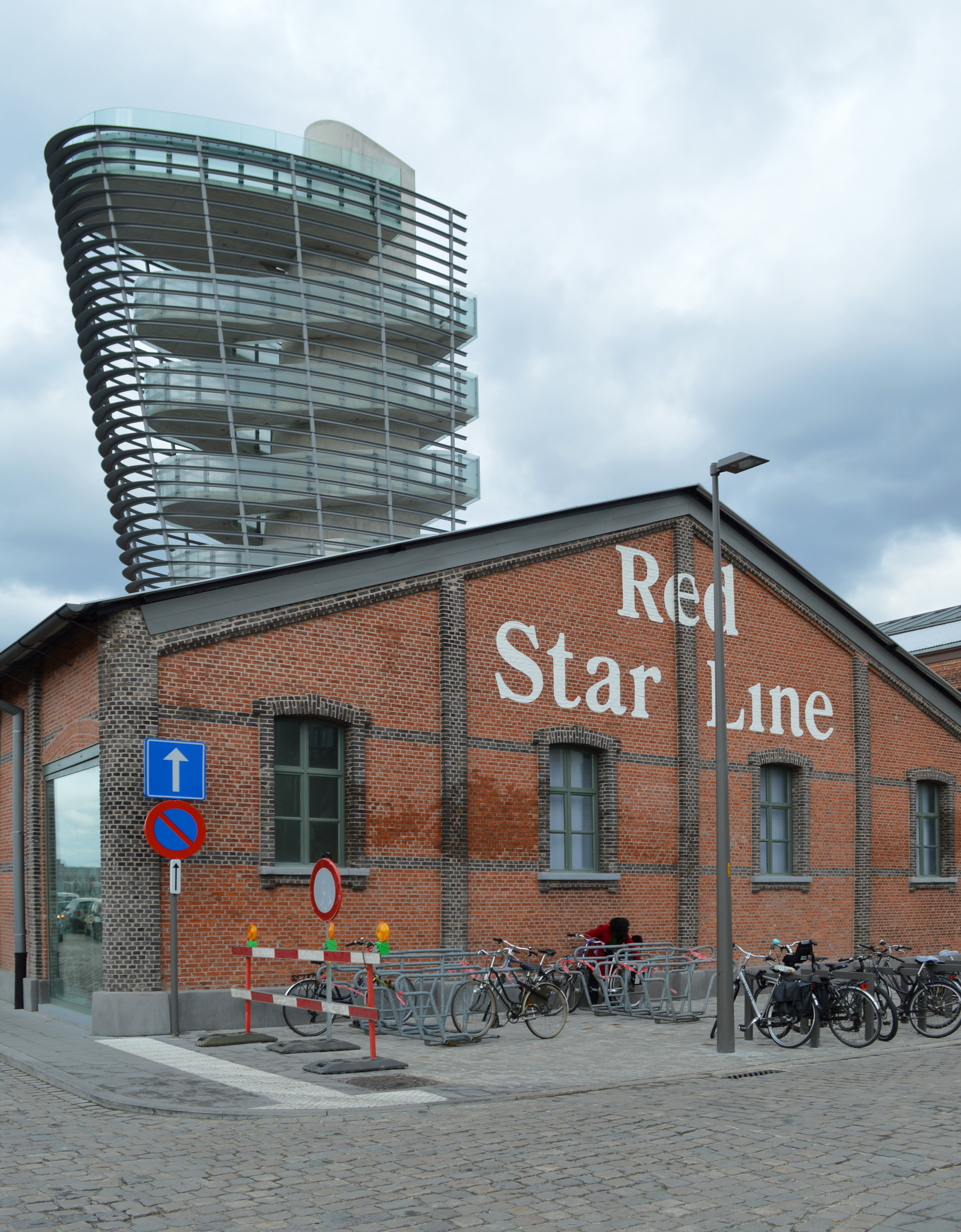
Red Star Line museum at Antwerp

The former warehouses of the Red Star Line in Antwerp were designated as a landmark and reopened as a museum on 28 September 2013 by the City of Antwerp. The main focus of the museum is the travel stories that could be retrieved through relatives of the some two million Red Star Line passengers. In the exhibition the visitor follows the travelers' tracks from the travel agency in Warsaw until their arrival in New York. The museum exhibits works of art depicting the Red Star Line emigrants by the Antwerp artist Eugeen Van Mieghem (1875–1930), together with Red Star Line memorabilia from the collection of Robert Vervoort.

About a quarter of the some two million Red Star Line migrants were Jews, largely from Eastern Europe until the exodus driven by the rise of Nazi Germany. Among them were many famous persons, including regular passenger Albert Einstein. On learning of the Nazi confiscation of his possessions, Einstein chose not to return to Germany; his letter resigning from the Prussian Academy of Sciences, written on the line's stationery, is a part of the museum exhibit. Other notable emigrants included the five-year-old Irving Berlin.

== Ships ==
Red Star Line ships had a black funnel with a white band bearing a five-pointed red star. The house flag was a white burgee with a red star.

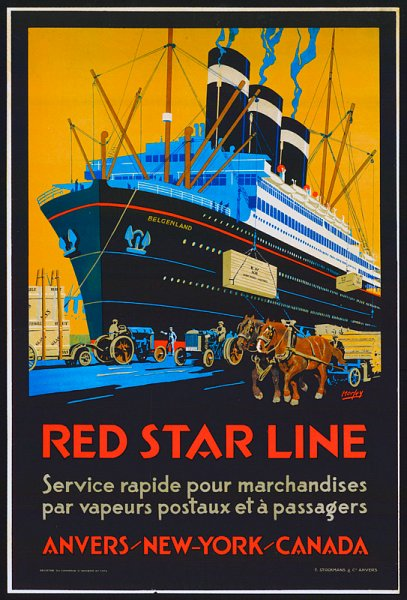
Poster of the second Belgenland by Henri Cassiers

Most Red Star ships were given names ending in "-land". Notable Red Star ships included:

- Abbotsford (1873). Chartered from Gourlay Brothers, Dundee, in 1874.
- Adria (1896). chartered from Hamburg America Line in 1899.
- Arabic (1908). Chartered from White Star Line 1926–29.
- Belgenland (1878). Sold to Italian owners in 1905 and renamed Venere.
- Belgenland (1914). Completed as troop ship Belgic for White Star Line. Transferred to Panama Pacific Line, renamed Columbia.
- Berlin (1874). Chartered from American Line for seven voyages 1895–98.
- Cambroman (1892). Built by Laird Brothers, Birkenhead. Chartered from Dominion Line for four voyages 1907.
- Conemaugh (1882). Built by Bartram, Haswell & Co of Sunderland as Sacrobosco. Bought in 1890 after salvage. 1897 transferred to New York – Seattle route, 1904 went missing at sea.
- Finland (1902). Scrapped in 1928.
- Friesland (1889). Sold to Italian owners in 1905 and renamed La Plata in 1912.
- Gothland (1893). Built for White Star Line as Gothic. Transferred to Red Star Line in 1908 and renamed Gothland. Transferred back to White Star Line in 1911 and name reverted to Gothic. Transferred again in 1913 to Red Star Line and name changed to Gothland. Scrapped in 1925.
- Kroonland (1902). Scrapped in 1927.

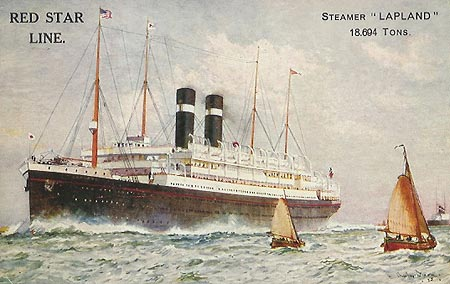
Postcard of Lapland

- Lapland (1908). Scrapped in 1934.
- Nederland (1873).
- Noordland (1883). Built by Laird Brothers, Birkenhead. Scrapped 1908.
- Pennland (1870). First ship of this name. Built at Glasgow by J&G Thomson & Co and launched as Algeria for Cunard Line. Sold to Red Star Line, renamed Pennland, and refitted in 1881. Went into Antwerp – New York passenger service in 1889. Scrapped in Italy in 1903.
- Pennland (1922). Launched for American Line as Pittsburgh. Transferred to Red Star Line in 1935 and renamed Pennland. Sunk in 1941 after being damaged by enemy aircraft.
- Rhynland (1879). Sold to Italian owners in 1906, renamed Rhyna and scrapped.
- Rusland (1872). Built as Kenilworth for American Line. Acquired in 1877, ran aground at Long Branch, NJ on 19 March 1877, subsequently broke in two and declared a total loss.
- Samland (1902). Transferred from Atlantic Transport Line in 1906. Served until 1911 when it was chartered by White Star Line. Returned to Red Star Line in 1913. Scrapped in 1931.
- Vaderland (1872). Sold to France in 1879 and renamed Geographique.
- Vaderland (1900). Renamed Southland in 1915. Sunk by torpedo in 1917 with the loss of four lives.
- Waesland (1867). Built as Russia. Acquired and renamed Waesland in 1880. Transferred to American Line in 1895. Sunk in collision with Houston steamship Harmonides in 1902.
- Westernland (1883). Built by Laird Brothers, Birkenhead. An early steamship to be built of steel. She sailed the Antwerp – New York route. Transferred to American Line in 1901 and scrapped in 1912.

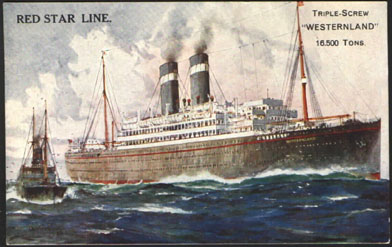
Postcard of the second Westernland

- Westernland (1917). Launched for White Star Line as Regina. Transferred to Red Star Line in 1929 and renamed Westernland. Transferred to Bernstein Red Star Line of Hamburg in 1935. Was an Allied troop ship in the Battle of Dakar in 1940.
- Zeeland (1878). Bought as Java from Cunard Line in 1878. Sold to France in 1889.
- Zeeland (1901). Launched 1900 and remained with Red Star until World War I 1914

== In popular culture ==
The Red Star Lines appear in the Mario Puzo's The Godfather Part II when the young Vito Corleone arrives in New-York. His identification badge is from the Red Star Lines company.

The Paris football club Red Star FC are named after the Red Star Line, on which the club's founder Jules Rimet's English housekeeper had travelled.

In James Cameron's Titanic, a warehouse can be seen at the Southampton Docks labelled Red Star Line. It is seen through the window of the pub as Jack and Fabrizio are first introduced.
