= Princess Lida of Thurn and Taxis =

- Prev. Mrs. Fitzgerald
- Born: Lida Eleanor Nicolls; July 28, 1875; Uniontown, Pennsylvania, U.S.
- Died: December 6, 1965 (aged 90); New York City, New York, U.S.
- Spouse: Gerald Purcell Fitzgerald; Prince Victor of Thurn and Taxis
- Issue: John Fitzgerald; Gerald Purcell Fitzgerald Jr. Edward Purcell Fitzgerald
- House: Thurn and Taxis (by marriage)
- Father: John A. Nicolls
- Mother: Lenora T. Nicolls

Lida, Princess Victor of Thurn and Taxis (née Lida Eleanor Nicolls; July 28, 1875 – December 6, 1965), also styled as Princess Lida of Thurn and Taxis, was an American millionairess, socialite, and the wife of Prince Victor of Thurn and Taxis. She was well known for her involvement in several highly publicized legal disputes, making her a fixture in newspapers such as The New York Times. The first such dispute was with former New York showgirl Josephine Moffitt, who claimed to be the legal spouse of Prince Victor using the name "Josephine, Princess of Thurn and Taxis" and the second was with Bernard Francis S. Gregory, who sued her for $50,000, alleging she had slandered him.

== Early life ==
Born Lida Eleanor Nicolls in 1875 in Uniontown, Pennsylvania, she was the daughter of grocer John A. Nicolls and his wife Lenora T. Nicolls. She was a niece of Josiah V. Thompson, a Pittsburgh banker, and coal & fuel operator. While living in Uniontown, Lida was childhood friends with George Marshall.

== First marriage ==
In 1899, she met her first husband, General Gerald Purcell Fitzgerald of Ireland. Fitzgerald was a nephew of Edward FitzGerald, a poet famous for his translation of Omar Khayyám's Rubaiyat of Omar Khayyam from Persian into English. He had relocated to Fayette County, Pennsylvania to try his hand at the coal industry, where he laid out the coal town of Shamrock near New Salem. They married in Los Angeles, California, late in 1899.

In 1906, she obtained a divorce from Fitzgerald in Irish courts. British law required an Act of Parliament to make their separation final. According to Lida, Fitzgerald treated her with "great cruelty". In her petition to Parliament, Lida recounted how Fitzgerald "dragged your subject out of bed in the middle of the room and she had to scream for help", and how at the Van Nuys Hotel in Los Angeles, he "seized and shook your subject most violently until her hat fell off and her hair fell down". Parliament passed the "Fitzgerald's Divorce (Ireland) Act" in 1907. In Pittsburgh, Lida was awarded an alimony settlement of $20,000 per year and $300,000 in trust for two sons from the marriage, John Fitzgerald and Gerald Purcell Fitzgerald Jr.

== Second marriage ==
Lida married Prince Victor Theodore Maximilian Egon Maria Lamoral of Thurn and Taxis, third and youngest child of Prince Egon of Thurn and Taxis and his wife, Viktoria Johanna Edelspacher de Gyoryok, in a wedding ceremony at the home of her mother and presided over by the Reverend Mr. Spence on November 1, 1911, in Uniontown. The couple had arrived from England the previous Friday. Prior to the marriage, Lida was reportedly said to possess $1 million in her own right. Following her marriage to Prince Victor, Lida announced that she and her husband would reside in Europe and she would never again return to the United States. Lida and Prince Victor later registered their marriage in Baltisar, Austria-Hungary in February 1912, where Prince Victor was a citizen by virtue of his father Prince Egon having become naturalized at the time of his marriage to his wife Viktoria Edelspacher de Gyoryok.

== Jewelry robbery and wrongful arrest of Kid McCoy ==
While staying at a hotel in Ostend, Belgium, in July 1912, Lida was robbed of jewelry valued at $80,000. The robbery was thought to have been committed by "a gang of international sharpers" who were staying at the same hotel as Lida. However, American boxer Norman Selby (better known as "Kid McCoy") was arrested at the Hotel Cecil in London on July 27, 1912 on an extradition request by Belgian police in connection with the disappearance of the jewelry. Selby was taken before the Bow Street Police Court Magistrate where he was remanded without bail. After the warrant for his arrest was read to him, Selby responded, "I know nothing whatever about it." He was incarcerated in Brixton Jail in London, where he wrote his own version of a "Ballad of Brixton Jail". He returned to New York City on September 1, 1912 aboard the American oceanliner SS St. Louis from Southampton. Selby instructed his solicitor to commence a suit against the government of Belgium for $250,000 for his "wrongful arrest" which he claimed "ruined [his] European business". "I did not know that there was such a person in the world as the Princess of Thurn and Taxis when I went to Ostend to spend the week-end", Selby said.

According to Le Matin, a French detective on the staff of M. Hamard conducted an investigation at the hotel which led him to suspect three "gentlemen" from London who occupied rooms next to Lida's apartments. The investigation found that the three gentlemen had formed a "gang of smart hotel thieves" and had intentionally taken rooms near those of Lida intending to take an amount of jewelry valued between $1 and $1.5 million. One of Lida's necklaces alone was reportedly worth $400,000, but the robbers were only able to abscond with a few pieces of jewelry lying on her dressing table.

== Identity dispute with Josephine Moffitt ==
Josephine Moffitt (occasionally spelled Moffatt), who styled and titled herself "Her Royal Highness Josephine, Princess of Thurn and Taxis" and "Princess Josphine de la Tour et Taxis", claimed in the United Kingdom that she was the legal wife of Lida's husband, Prince Victor. Moffitt was embroiled in another highly publicized legal case against her "old friend and admirer" James Henry Maur heard in the Westminster Police Court and known popularly as "the Thurn and Taxis blackmailing case." Moffitt alleged that she and Prince Victor had wed at a midnight marriage ceremony at Rector's, New York City. As early as March 1908, Prince Victor had informed The New York Times that its story of his marriage to Moffitt was "absolutely false".

On January 31, 1914, Lida's solicitor applied for and obtained an issue of writ in the Court of Chancery asking for an injunction against Moffitt to restrain her from using the title "Princess of Thurn and Taxis" and from referring to herself as the wife of Prince Victor of Thurn and Taxis. Lida then traveled to London in February 1914 to defend her marriage and title against Moffitt's claims in person. In addition to settling the legality of her marriage to Prince Victor, Lida also sought to restore her reputation which had been blemished by Moffitt's conduct in "meeting men for supper parties and theatres."

In an interview with The New York Times on February 15, 1914 in her suite at London's Carlton Hotel, Lida presented her marriage certificate as proof of her marriage to Prince Victor. Lida was awarded damages, trial costs, an injunction against Moffitt, and a verdict for $500. The Court of Chancery also ruled that Lida, and not Moffitt, was entitled to the title "Princess Victor of Thurn and Taxis".

On January 28, 1915, Lida was awarded a verdict of £250 ($1,250) in damages against The Daily Sketch in London after the newspaper published photographs of Lida and Moffitt asking the question, "Who Is Princess Thurn and Taxis?"

== Slander dispute with Bernard Francis S. Gregory ==
Following the outbreak of World War I, Lida's husband Prince Victor was called to serve as an officer in the Austro-Hungarian Army causing Lida to return to the United States. Shortly before Lida was to sail to Europe to rejoin her husband in the Austrian Republic, Bernard Francis S. Gregory, known as "Count Gregory", filed a lawsuit against her for $50,000 in damages on May 8, 1920 in the New York Supreme Court alleging she had made false statements about him which had caused him to be "shunned by social circles" in New York City. Gregory received the order from Justice Robert Paul Lydon shortly after he learned from Lida's son Gerald Fitzgerald, Dr. Stewart Hastings, and Prince Herman of Saxe-Weimar that she was soon returning to Europe.

Gregory alleged in his complaint that in January or February 1920 at the Hotel Netherland in New York City, Count Rudolf Festetics overheard Lida telling others that Gregory was "a thief and a swindler and had tried to swindle her out of $10,000 by trying to put through a milk deal that was a swindle." He also alleged that Lida said Gregory was "not a gentleman, but an imposter, was dishonorable, and had been a coachman in England, and was a very bad man." As a result of these statements, Gregory claimed he had "been seriously injured in [his] good name and fame among [his] friends and acquaintances, and in social circles in which [he had] been accustomed to move [he had] been shunned and avoided by [his] friends." Gregory further stated that he was no longer invited to dinners and social functions "among the best families in New York" and that he had been "ostracized and excluded from the best society."

== Later life ==
Following the death of her husband Prince Victor in Vienna on January 28, 1928, Lida lived between residences in Uniontown, Pennsylvania, New York City, and Europe, however, she continued to maintain a residence at the corner of West Main Street and South Mt. Vernon Avenue in Uniontown.

Lida's life continued to consist of further legal disputes regarding alimony and family matters. On April 19, 1937, Lida went to Federal court in Pittsburgh demanding an accounting from trustees of alimony and trust funds held for her and her son. She claimed the trustees had been negligent in collecting the money and interest of the trust funds which totalled $772,779.

An Internal Revenue Service (IRS) appeals board in Washington, D.C. ruled on January 12, 1938, that Lida owed no back income taxes on amounts she received under an agreement with her first husband at the time of their divorce settlement in 1907. The appeals board further ruled that alimony payments to a former spouse were considered a "household expense" and therefore could not be deducted on income tax returns.

Lida and her son John Purcell Fitzgerald carried their appeal against the trustees of two trust funds in their names at the Second National Bank to the United States Supreme Court on an injunction restraining them from proceeding in the United States District Court for the Western District of Pennsylvania. s:Princess Lida of Thurn and Taxis v. Thompson

She was later also entangled in a lengthy court battle in which she attempted to have the marriage of one of her adult sons annulled.

== Death and estate settlement ==
Following several years of hospitalization, she died in New York City at the age of 90 on December 6, 1965, intestate. In November 1972, Judge James A. Reilly issued a decree, which approved the final accounting of Lida's million-dollar estate and ordered that it be divided between her two surviving sons: Gerald Purcell Fitzgerald Jr. of New York City and Edward Purcell Fitzgerald of Titusville, New Jersey. At its final accounting, Lida's estate totaled $1,288,123.40, leaving a balance of $659,333.31 after taxes. Her possessions included residences, properties, cash, stocks and bonds, valuable antique furniture, Venetian glass, paintings and statuary, china, porcelain, silver, and two wardrobes full of fur coats. Many of Lida's valuables were stored for years in a downtown Uniontown warehouse and some had been in storage in a London warehouse since the closing of her home there in 1914. Most of the valuables were sold at auction in 1966.

== See also ==
- Thurn und Taxis
