= Fred Webb =

British jockey

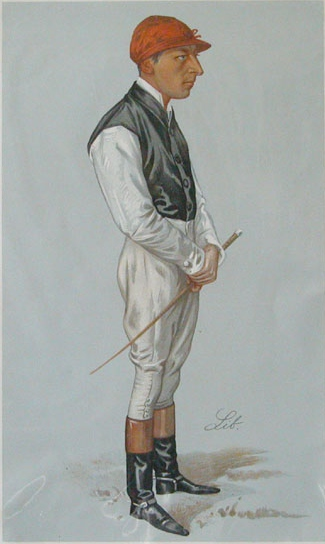
- Fred Webb – Caricature from Vanity Fair, 10 August 1889

Personal information
- Born: 1853
- Died: 1917 (aged 63–64) Eastbourne, Sussex
- Occupation: Jockey

Horse racing career
- Sport: Horse racing

Major racing wins
- Major races 2,000 Guineas Stakes (1881); Epsom Derby (1873); Champion Stakes (1883, 1884 (dh)); Doncaster Cup (1877); Goodwood Cup (1877); Sussex Stakes (1884)

Significant horses
- Doncaster, Hampton, Hermitage, Peregrine, Tristan

Frederic E. Webb (1853–1917) was a British Classic winning jockey.

Webb was apprenticed to trainer Mathew Dawson at Heath House, Newmarket. His first major victory was the 1869 Cesarewitch Handicap on Cherie. He finished the season with 27 wins. His 1873 Derby win on James Merry's Doncaster was unexpected. He was only booked for the ride on the morning of the race because the intended jockey James Snowden was too drunk. Later in 1873, he won the Middle Park Stakes on Newby.

In 1877 his six wins included the Northumberland Plate, the Goodwood Cup and the Doncaster Cup on Hampton.

Webb's other Classic success came in 1881 with Peregrine in the 2,000 Guineas. A few weeks previously, he had finished fifth in the Grand National on The Scot. In 1884, he won the Cambridgeshire on Florence. For the Derby, Webb again partnered Peregrine, although friend and fellow jockey, Fred Archer tried to steal the ride, approaching the trainer, Robert Peck, saying "give Webb a thousand and put me up". In the event, Archer on Iroquois, which was second in the Guineas, beat Webb and Peregrine by a neck.

He won two successive runnings of the Champion Stakes on Tristan – outright in 1883 and dead-heating in 1884.

He was a stylish rider and a strong finisher. A long face and prominent nose gave him a lugubrious appearance.

Webb began training in 1895 for Lillie Langtry, Lord Shrewsbury and others at Ethelreda House, Newmarket, shortly before weight gain meant he had to give up race riding. For Langtry, he won the 1897 Cesarewitch with Merman. Later, he went to Hungary to train for Prince Victor of Thurn and Taxis. He died of diabetes in Eastbourne in 1917.

== Major wins ==
(United Kingdom) Great Britain

- 2,000 Guineas Stakes – Peregrine (1881)
- Epsom Derby – Doncaster (1873)
- Champion Stakes – Tristan (1883, 1884 (dh))
- Doncaster Cup – Hampton (1877)
- Goodwood Cup – Hampton (1877)
- Sussex Stakes – Hermitage (1884)

== Bibliography ==
- Mortimer, Roger; Onslow, Richard; Willett, Peter (1978). Biographical Encyclopaedia of British Racing. London: Macdonald and Jane's. ISBN 0-354-08536-0.
- Tanner, Michael; Cranham, Gerry (1992). Great Jockeys of the Flat – A celebration of two centuries of jockeyship. Guinness. ISBN 978-0-85112-989-1.
