= Trafalgar Graving Dock =

Old graving dock in Southampton, United Kingdom

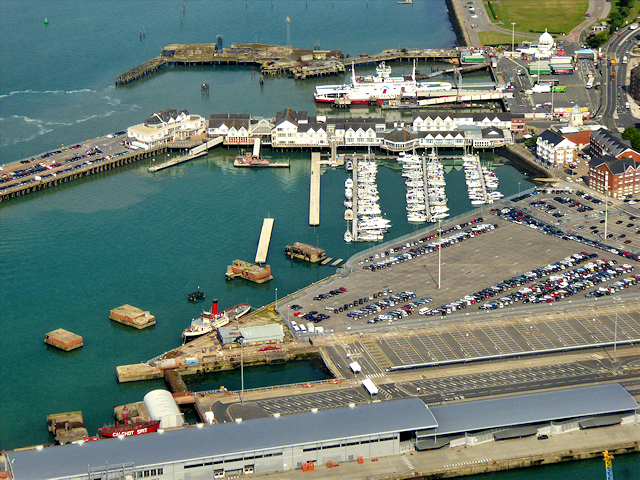
- In front, the partly filled up Trafalgar Graving Dock in 2016

History

United Kingdom
- Name: Trafalgar Graving Dock
- Namesake: Battle of Trafalgar (1805)
- Completed: 21 October 1905
- Home port: Southampton; maps 50.894093°N 1.400978°W

General characteristics (as completed)
- Length: 897 ft (273.4 m) (1913); 875 ft 3 in (266.8 m) (1905)
- Beam: Entrance: 100 ft (30.5 m) (1913); 90 ft (27.4 m) (1905); Floor: 102 ft (31.1 m) (1913); 90 ft (27.4 m) (1905)
- Draft: 35 ft (10.7 m) (1913); 33 ft (10.1 m) (1905)

Trafalgar Graving Dock was one of the largest dry docks in the world. It opened in 1905 but had to be extended when the White Star Line came to Southampton and brought the Olympic-class ocean liners, which included Titanic.

The dock is colloquially known as Trafalgar Dry Dock and is also known as 'Dry Dock No 6'. It is located just west of Ocean Dock, from where Titanic left on her maiden voyage. Ocean Dock is now used by cruise ships that visit Southampton.

Trafalgar Graving Dock is no longer in operation and is now a grade II listed building. It has been partly filled up with gravel to create a car park on top of it.

== Context ==
Southampton possessed some geographical characteristics that made it a good harbor. A unique advantage was the second tide, caused by the Isle of Wight. Later, dredging and construction made it possible for big ships to (un)load directly to the shore, instead of having to transload to boats. In about 1840, the railroad then gave Southampton a hinterland, leading to a swift development of the port.

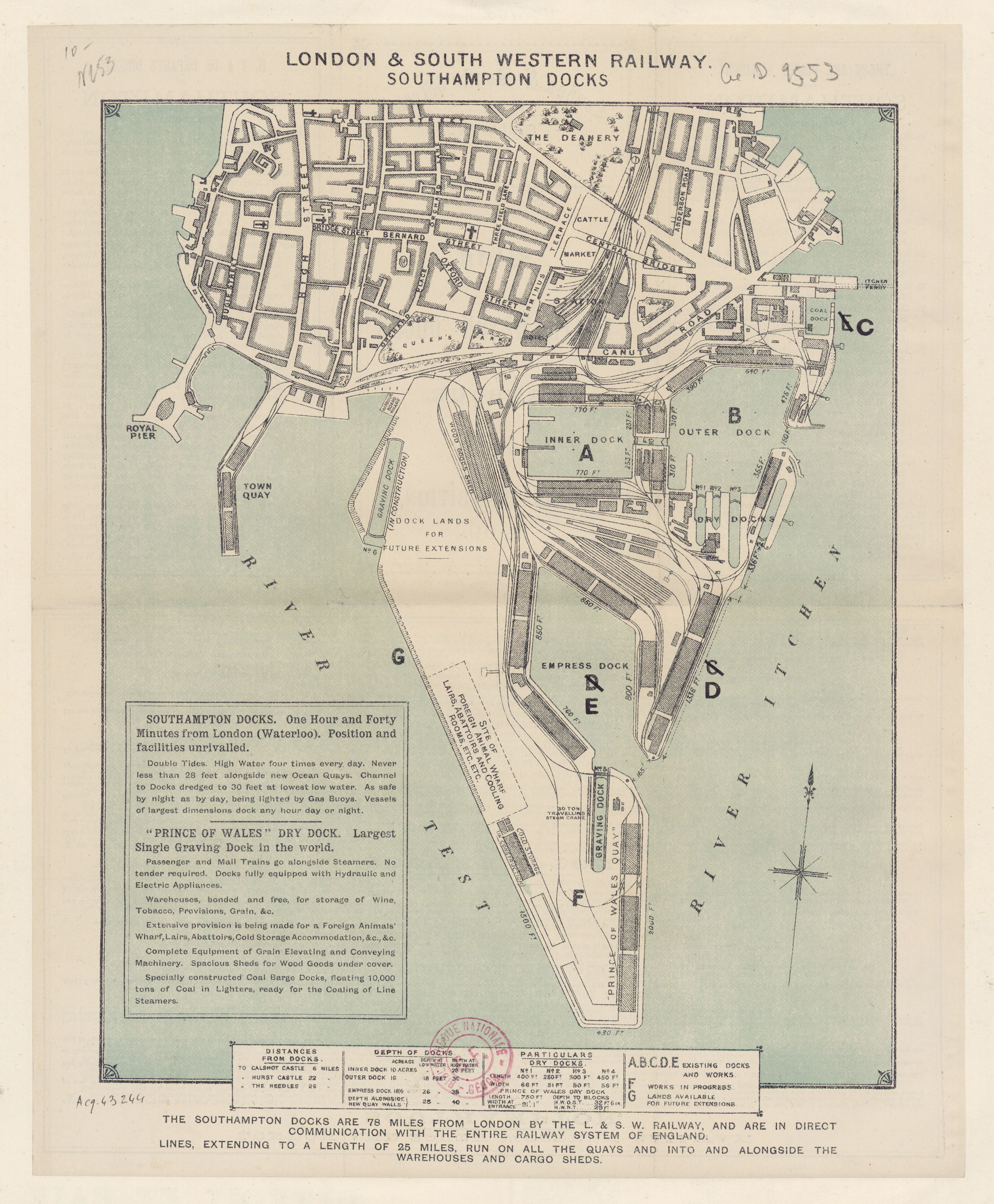
Designated as 'in construction', on a 1900 map

In general, there were two kinds of artificial moorings in Southampton. The moorings called quays enabled ships to attach to shore while remaining in open water. The ones called docks were dug out, sheltered areas that had a relatively small opening that put them in communication with the sea. This opening was sometimes given gates. At Portsmouth, the Inner Dock had gates, the Outer Dock did not. Technically, the sides of the docks were also quays. Most of the quays were owned by the Southampton Harbour Board. The docks were owned by the Southampton Dock Company. This also had its Itchen Extension Quay.

The Southampton Dock Company opened its first dock in 1843. By 1890, the Southampton Dock Company had become very big. It owned four docks, four graving docks, and 208 acres (0.84 km^{2}) of land on which there were all kinds of warehouses and ten miles (16 km) of railways. At about that time, about a dozen major shipping lines called at Southampton. Some of these, like the Royal Mail Steam Packet Company and Norddeutscher Lloyd employed ocean liners.

In the early 1890s, it also became clear that the Southampton Dock Company did not have enough capital. It could not make the investments that were required to remain competitive. In November 1892, the London and South Western Railway then bought it for 1,360,000 GBP. The interest of the railway company was simple. It wanted to direct cross-channel and oceanic traffic to Southampton, so passengers and cargo would use its railway and not those for Liverpool or Calais. The largest dry dock at Southampton was Graving Dock No 3 of 500 by 80 by 21 feet (152.4 by 24.4 by 6.4 m). As some ocean liners had outgrown it, the new owners ordered the construction of Prince of Wales Graving Dock, opened in August 1895. It measured 750 by 87.5 feet (228.6 by 26.7 m) and was the deepest of the world, with 32.5 feet (9.9 m) of water over the blocks at spring tide.

== Construction ==
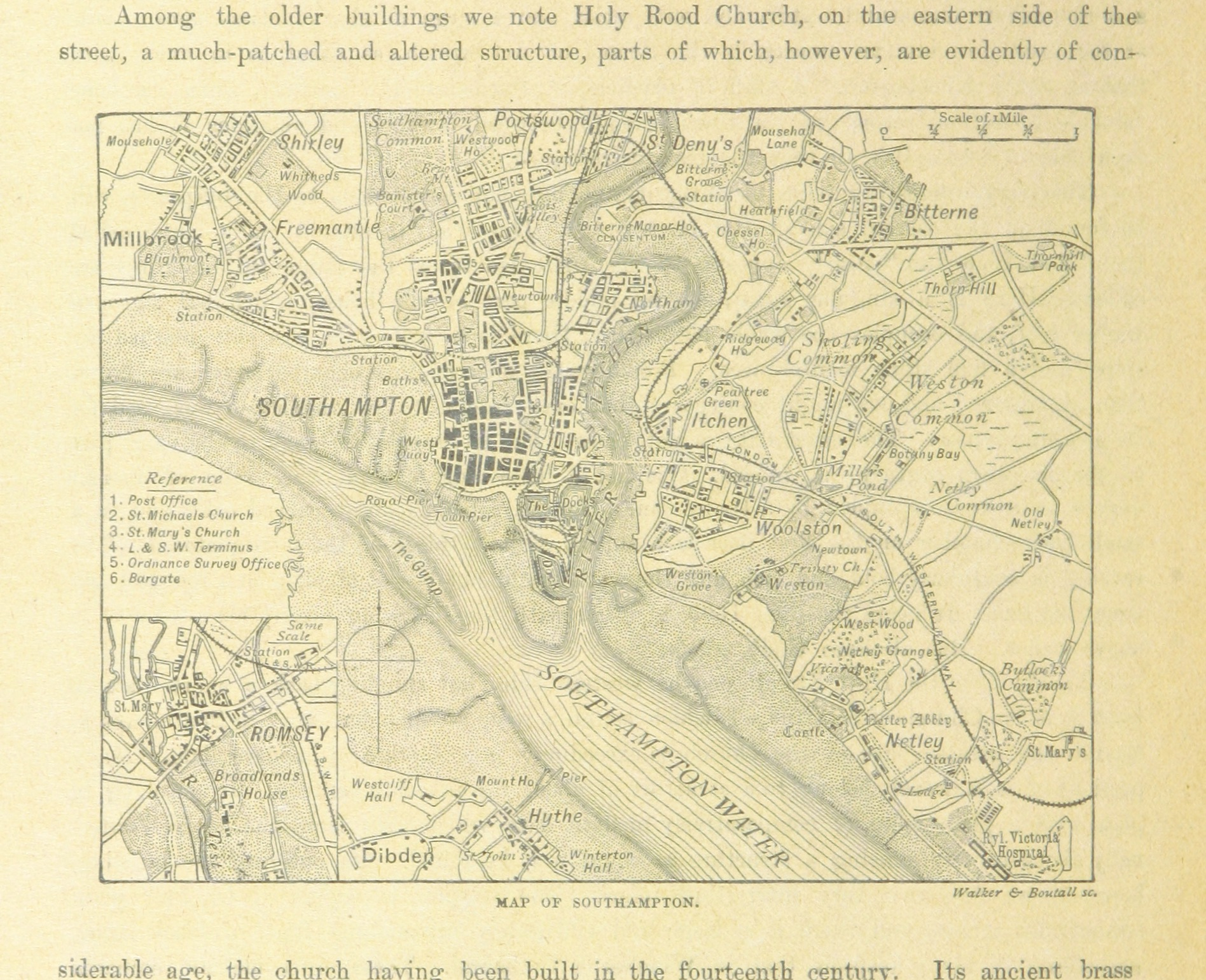
Map published 1898, showing the mud lands.

Trafalgar Dry Dock was constructed on a piece of mud land that was covered by river water at every high tide. Therefore, a horseshoe shaped bank of chalk was laid down around its future form. This was covered with clay to make it watertight and pitched with stones to strengthen it. The form was then pumped dry and dug out. Along the sides, huge forms were sunk down, and the walls were built by pouring concrete into them. Excavation between the walls then allowed to construct the dock floor.

Construction of the dry dock on reclaimed land required a lot of legislation. A 1900 map shows Trafalgar Graving Dock as being 'in construction', but it is not known to which phase of construction this refers. In October 1901, the new dry dock was reported to be under construction.

The dock was designed by W. R. Galbraith, consulting engineer of the London and South Western Railway. The work was executed by Messrs. John Aird & Co.

== Characteristics ==
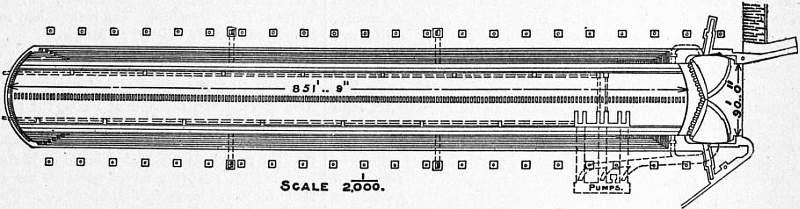
Floor plan of the dock

Trafalgar Graving Dock was shaped like a long rectangular box. At the land end, it was slightly rounded, creating an arch that made it easier to withstand pressures. On the sea side there was also such an arch, but this of course got no higher than the sill, see floor plan. The box had been made almost entirely of Portland cement concrete. 133,000 cubic yards (102,000 m^{3}) of this material were used. The concrete was made tougher on the facings of the floor, walls, and culvert linings. The downside of the floor also had such a tougher concrete facing that extended to the walls. This was to prevent water from leaking through. The quoins against which the gates closed were made of granite.

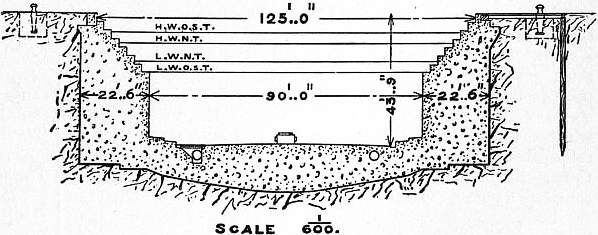
Cross section of the dock

The floor of the dock was flat on the surface, but V-shaped on the underside. It was 16 ft (4.9 m) thick on the keel line. The walls were 22 ft 6 in (6.9 m) thick diminishing to 3 ft (0.9 m) at the coping level. Near the top, there were seven altars, or lines of steps 2 ft 6 in (0.8 m) wide and 2 ft 9 in (0.8 m). These were used to place the shoring beams that kept a ship from falling over when balanced on the keel blocks.

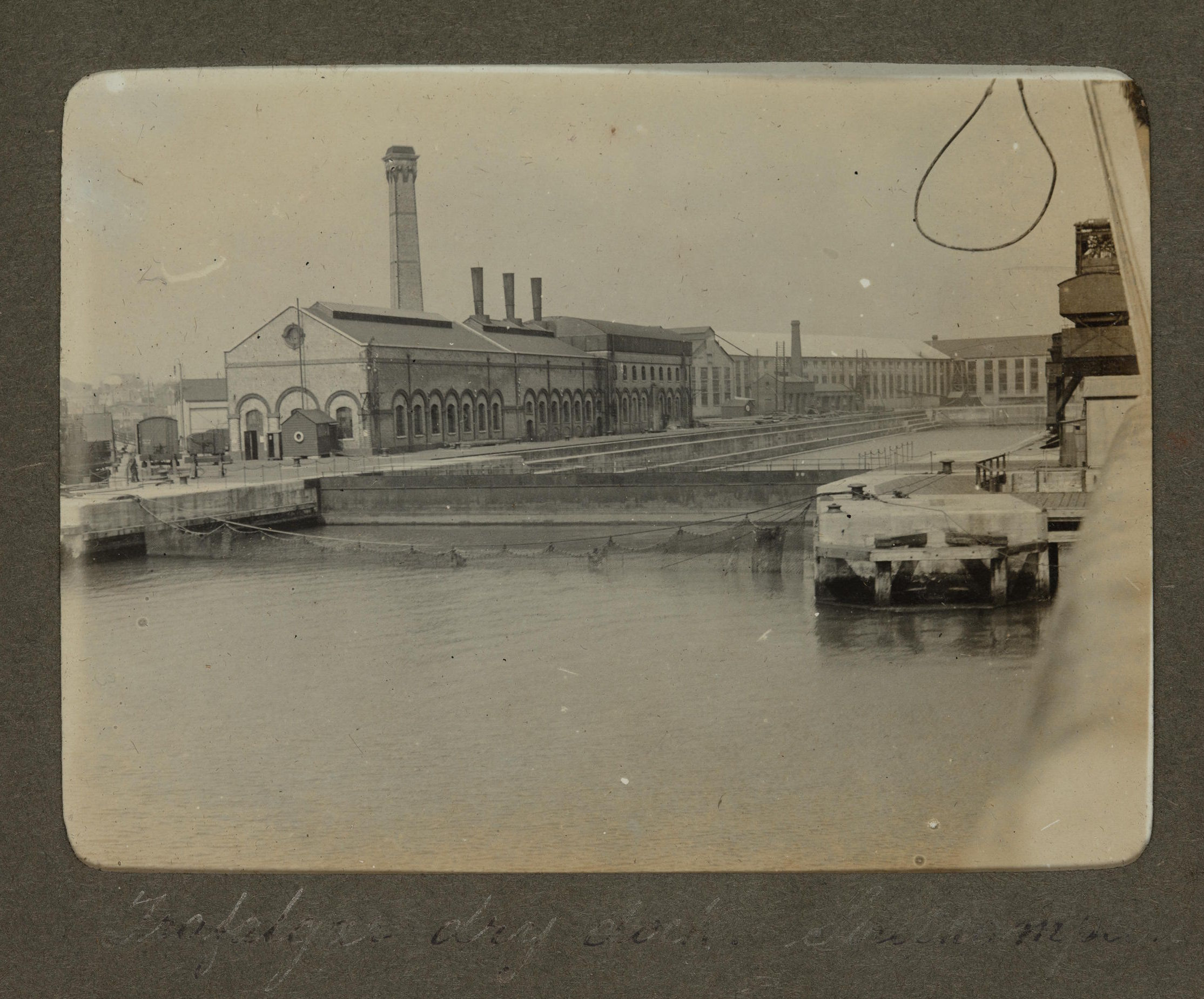
Sliding caisson, 1915–1917

The dock was originally closed by a pair of mitre gates. These faced outwards, so the sea would push them shut. The gates were made by Messrs. Head, Wrightson & Co of Teesdale. Each leaf contained 250 tons of steel and had Greenheart timber facings. The doors were opened and closed by hydraulic rams made by Armstrong Whitworth. In 1913, the gates were replaced by a sliding caisson. Also see the 2016 photo.

The dock could contain 85,000 tons of water. Near the entrance, there were six large pits. From these, three large tunnels led to the pump well, which were 10 ft (3.0 m) below the dock floor. The pumphouse held two 48 inch centrifugal pumps made by Gwynne. Driven by vertical steam engines and seven locomotive type boilers, these could pump the dock dry in 2.5 hours.

Of course, the dry dock had a plant for servicing ships. One of the tools used for this was a steel electric crane that moved on rails. It was built by Stothert & Pitt. In 1905 this was the largest of its kind in the world. It could lift more than 50 tons at a radius of 87 ft (26.5 m).

Like that of any drydock, the size of Trafalgar Graving Dock was measured over several points.

The drydock was 875 ft 3 in (266.8 m) long at the floor from the gate cill to the dock head. The length occupied by keel blocks was 839 ft (255.7 m). In 1913 the dock was to become 897 ft (273.4 m) long, with a recess for the ship's bows at the land end. A later change lengthened Trafalgar Graving Dock to 912 ft (278.0 m).

The width of the dock was 90 ft (27.4 m) at the floor level. In 1913, this became 102 ft (31.1 m) At cope level, it was 125 ft (38.1 m). The entrance width was also given as 90 ft (27.4 m) in 1905. In 1913, the entrance was made 100 ft (30.5 m) wide.

The height of the dock from cope to floor was 43 ft (13.1 m). The depth of water on the sill was 33 ft (10.1 m) at spring tide, and 29 ft 6 in (9.0 m) at neap tide. This was also the level of water above the keel blocks. In 1913, the level of water over the blocks was increased to 35 ft (10.7 m). The cross section of the dock shows these water levels with the usual designations like HWNT meaning High Water Neap Tide.

== Service ==
On a 1965 map

Trafalgar Graving Dock was opened by the Marquess of Winchester on 21 October 1905.

The dry dock became involved with the Titanic story, when the White Star Line moved from Liverpool to Southampton in 1907. By September 1910, it was known that it had been decided to extend Trafalgar Graving Dock, so it could service the Olympic-class ocean liners. The work was expected to take about 12 months. It was finished in late 1913.

In 1911, the new White Star Dock (Ocean Dock since 1922), was opened to accommodate Olympic. On 28 February 1912, Olympic arrived in Southampton from the United States missing a propeller blade. As Trafalgar Graving Dock was not yet ready to service Olympic had to return to Belfast, because only Thompson Graving Dock was big enough to service her. However, it meant that Titanic had to leave that dry dock, where she was being finished. Ocean Dock was where Titanic started her maiden trip.

In 1924, a new floating dry dock, the largest in the world, was moored near Trafalgar Graving Dock. It meant the dock was outclassed. This was even more the case when the 1,200 ft (365.8 m) long King George V Graving Dock opened in 1934.

In 1988, Trafalgar Graving Dock became a listed building as Trafalgar Dry Dock

== The end ==
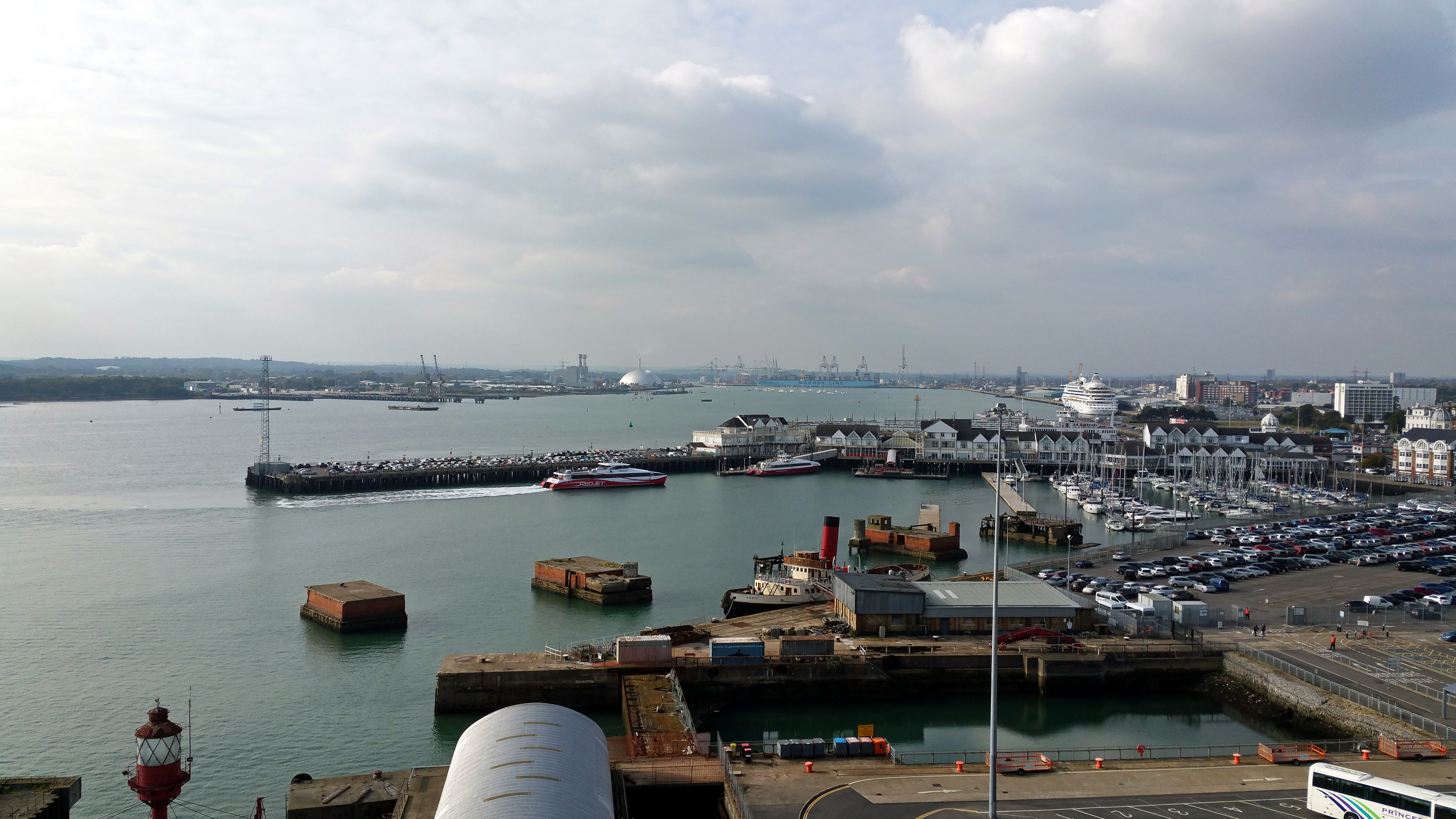
The sliding caisson gate in the foreground

The last use of Trafalgar Dry Dock for ship repairs took place in 1989. In about 1996, the dock was emptied for a final time. Port operator Associated British Ports (ABP) then used it to store gravel dredged from the bottom of the Solent. It led to a conflict with local authorities, but the gravel was not removed, and a parking lot was made on top of it. Only a small part of the dock is now still open, but the top of its walls is still clearly visible on the floor of the parking lots west of Ocean Dock.

In 2016, a plan to move the terminal of Red Funnel's line to Wight to a position just west of Trafalgar Dry Dock was approved. Now, Associated British Ports, Carnival UK, and residents objected due to concerns over traffic and the height of the terminal's car park. The entrance of the car park was to be built right on top of the dock. However, the plan was primarily about using the lands of the existing terminal to build new houses and business venues. Several concerns about this aspect of the plan caused it to fail. In August 2019, Southampton City Council ended the deal that would include moving the terminal.
