= International Navigation Company =

Transatlantic shipping company (1871-1902)

- Type: Holding Company
- Industry: Shipping
- Founded: 1871
- Defunct: 1943 (Name changed); 1986 (Bankruptcy)
- Headquarters: Philadelphia
- Area served: Transatlantic
- Key people: Clement Griscom
- Footnotes; Owned Red Star Line and American Line

The International Navigation Company (INC) was a Philadelphia-based holding company owning 26 ships totaling 181,000 tons and carried more passengers than either Cunard or White Star, when the company was reorganized as International Mercantile Marine in 1902. The General Assembly of the Commonwealth of Pennsylvania approved a charter for the INC on May 5, 1871. The company was commonly known as the Red Star Line due to the red star on its white house flag. The principal American organizer and general agent of INC was the shipbroking firm of Peter Wright & Sons, one of the oldest, most respected, and most financially prosperous of the Philadelphia import-export houses. Principal financial backing was provided by the Pennsylvania Railroad Company. Although the financial interests were headquartered in the United States, the backers did not believe that a transatlantic steamship line could be run successfully under an American flag. Ships were to be built in foreign yards, operated under foreign flags, and crewed with foreign sailors.

Peter Wright & Sons provided invaluable commercial expertise and foreign contacts. The firm operated a large fleet of ships, with many transporting petroleum from the recently discovered fields of western Pennsylvania, carried in barrels and cases, to European markets. Peter Wright & Sons also had established friendships and business ties with two prominent Belgian shipowners, Jules-Bernard von Der Becke and William Edouard Marsily. During the 1860s, the von Der Becke firm became an important importer of petroleum products from Pennsylvania to Antwerp in American and Belgian ships. Clement Action Griscom, who rose rapidly from clerk to partner at Peter Wright & Sons, was a leader in the firm's shipping affairs and the chief force behind the creation of both INN and the chief negotiator with Belgian's King Leopold, von Der Becke, and Marsily to establish a subsidiary company in Antwerp beginning on September 19, 1872, under the title "Societe Anonyme de Navigation Belge-Americaine" (Red Star Line). The agreement established the Red Star Line as the exclusive carrier of mail service out of Antwerp to Philadelphia and New York. This subsidiary would provide most of the company's profits for the next 30 years. The shipping line's home port was Antwerp and it sailed under the Belgian flag, thereby avoiding the obligation of employing far more expensive American personnel.

In January, 1874, the board of directors of the American Line, a Philadelphia-based passenger and cargo service to Liverpool that was also backed by the Pennsylvania Railroad and was facing possible bankruptcy, passed management of the steamship line to Peter Wright & Sons. Clement Griscom was charged by the firm to manage the American Line as well as the Red Star Line. The former company, known as the American “Keystone” Line was unprofitable because of the substantially higher costs associated with operating American-flagged vessels. In 1884, the assets of the American Line were acquired by International Navigation. Two years later, INC also acquired the assets of the financially troubled Inman Line, operator of a British flagged Liverpool-New York mail service. With PRR's backing, Griscom ordered two record breakers to restore Inman's fortunes. However, the British Government objected to Inman's ownership change and revoked Imman's mail contract. Griscom successfully lobbied Congress to reflag the two new express liners and qualify for an American mail subsidy. In 1893, Inman was merged the American Line and the company built two additional express liners in the US to create a premium weekly service, now routed to Southampton.

Griscom believed that the major lines should be merged to control capacity and avoid rate wars. In 1899, he became acquainted with J. P. Morgan, an investment banker who was responsible for many of the large mergers during the period. With financing from Morgan's syndicate, in 1902 Griscom and Morgan expanded International Navigation by acquiring the Atlantic Transport Line, the Leyland Line, the White Star Line, the Dominion Line and half of Holland America. International Navigation was renamed International Mercantile Marine (IMM).

However, Griscom and Morgan paid too high a price for the companies they acquired and IMM struggled under the debt payments. Management was reorganized to focus on White Star, the most profitable subsidiary. In 1915, IMM was forced into bankruptcy when the war disrupted cash flow, but later was able to profit from the wartime demand for shipping. In the 1920s and 1930s, IMM gradually sold off its foreign subsidiaries. In 1931, it acquired the United States Lines, and merged all operations under that name in 1943. The company failed in 1986 and was liquidated when it over expanded in the cargo container business.

== 1871–84 ==
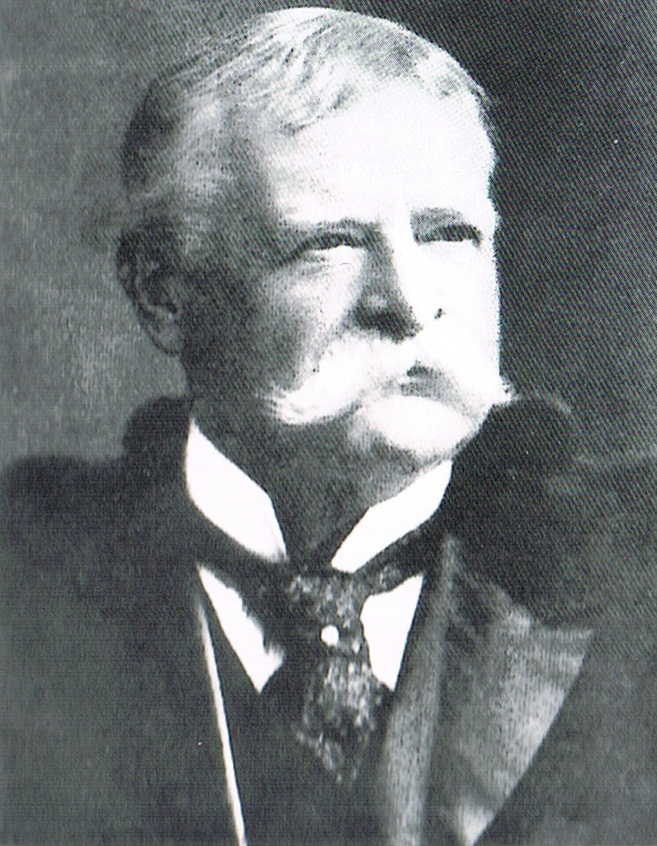
Clement A. Griscom (1841 - 1912): Longtime President of International Navigation

In 1858, the Inman Line abandoned Philadelphia as its American terminus and switched its operations to New York. Various interests in Philadelphia, including the Pennsylvania Railroad, recognized the need to reestablish steamship service directly to Europe. In 1870, PRR backed the creation of two shipping companies, the US-flagged American Steamship Company and the foreign flagged International Navigation Company. Chartered on May 5, 1871, International Navigation was created by the Philadelphia ship brokerage of Peter Wright & Sons. A $1 million bond issue was guaranteed by PRR and the initial $1.5 million stock offering was largely purchased by a small group of Peter Wright partners and PRR executives. The new firm's affairs were turned over to a 30-year-old Peter Wright partner, Clement A. Griscom, who was also a close associate of Edgar Thompson, President of PRR.

International Navigation's original plan was to operate UK flagged steamers on the Liverpool–Philadelphia route and to coordinate sailings with the American Steamship Company, operating as the American “Keystone” Line. Since Peter Wright & Sons was also involved in the early transport of oil from the Pennsylvania petroleum fields, Griscom had the support of the Standard Oil Company for his new steamship line. INC ordered its first steamer as a combined passenger ship/tanker, but she probably only carried oil on one voyage after it was realized that the fire hazard with tankers was too great to also carry passengers on the same ship.

In 1872, Griscom and Thompson concluded that International Navigation should seek a terminus on the continent. According to his son, Griscom marked all of the principal manufacturing towns in England, Belgium, France and Germany and determined that the center was Antwerp Belgium. Griscom immediately left for Europe and met with Antwerp officials about the necessary improvements to modernize the old port into the terminus for a steamship line. When he was told that Leopold II must also approve, Griscom left for Brussels where he received the King's strong support including a postal subsidy and port improvements. On September 27, 1872, the Red Star Line was chartered in Belgium as the “Societe Anonyme de Navigation Belge-Americaine”. In addition to Griscom, the board included Thomas Scott, who in two years would become President of the Pennsylvania Railroad.

Red Star's Antwerp–Philadelphia Service started in January 1873. Red Star took delivery of three new steamers built in England and supplemented its fleet with chartered tonnage. Red Star was in better position to survive the depression of 1873 than the US-flagged American “Keystone” Line because operating as a US carrier resulted in about 30% higher costs. At the end of 1873, Griscom took over management of the American Keystone Line. In 1874, Red Star also started an Antwerp-New York service under a mail contract from the Belgian Government.

Red Star thrived and by 1881 carried over 40,000 passengers. At the same time, the American Keystone Line was not profitable because of its higher cost structure. When the hoped for subsidy never came from Congress, PRR decided to reorganize American Steamship. In 1884, PRR offered to purchase 14,500 new shares in International Navigation for $725,000 to finance INC's purchase of American Steamship's four vessels as well as its name and good will. The money never actually left PRR's account because it was used to repay the railroad for the American Steamship bonds it guaranteed. When the transaction was completed, the American Keystone Line became INC's second operating subsidiary.

== 1884–93 ==
International Navigation's Liverpool agent was Richardson and Spence, who was also the agent for the Inman Line, one of the big three British flagged companies on the Liverpool–New York route. INC became a major creditor of Inman when that company suffered financial difficulties in the early 1880s. In 1886, with the backing of the Pennsylvania Railroad, Griscom offered £205,000 for Inman's five liners and name. Under the deal, Griscom was able to deduct the debt owed INC from the purchase price. With no real alternative, Inman's directors accepted the offer.

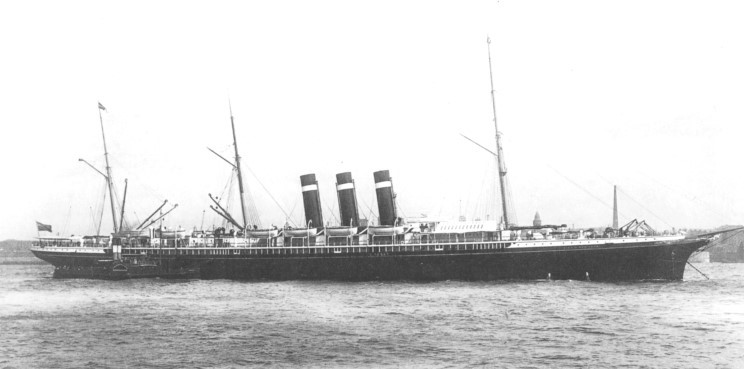
Griscom's first record breaker, City of New York

Griscom realized that the renamed Inman and International Line required a new express steamer to compete against its rivals, the Cunard Line and White Star. He sailed for Europe with a commitment of $2 million from the Pennsylvania Railroad to finance the new ship. Scottish shipbuilders were suffering a depression at the time and offered to build two liners at the bargain price of $1,850,000 apiece. The PRR agreed and Griscom ordered what were to become the two largest and fastest ships on the Atlantic, the 20 knot City of New York and City of Paris. He also ordered a large new liner for Red Star, the Friesland.

The intent was to continue Inman as a British-flagged company. However, considerable opposition developed over Inman's change in ownership, and the British Government transferred Inman's mail contract to the Guion Line. Under the Ocean Mail Act of 1891, the US Government offered to pay $12,500 per round-trip voyage to any American-flagged carrier offering 20-knot steamship service to the UK. However, this amount was not sufficient to attract firms to acquire the liners required under the act, and Griscom's two new 20-knot Atlantic speedsters could not qualify, because they were built in the UK. Therefore, Griscom and the Pennsylvania Railroad lobbied Congress to allow the reflagging of Inman's two record-breakers. Griscom also offered to build a second pair of 20-knot liners in a US yard so that Inman would have the four ships required for a weekly service. In May 1892, Congress enacted the necessary legislation. Five months later, the post office department agreed to contract with INC for a weekly New York–Southampton mail service. On February 22, 1893, President Benjamin Harrison personally raised the American flag on the newly renamed New York, and the Inman and International Line was officially merged into the American Line.

== 1893–1902 ==
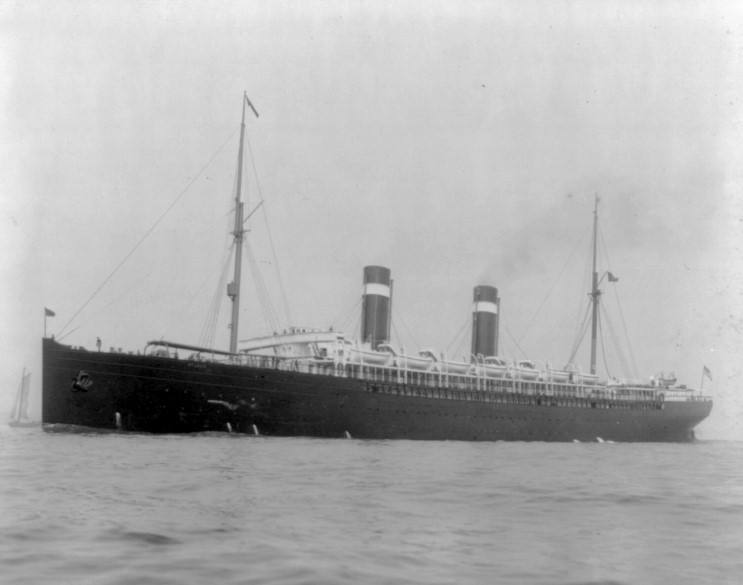
The American Line's St. Louis

To strengthen the company's finances, International Navigation was reorganized in June 1893. The original Pennsylvania chartered company was replaced by a new corporate entity, the International Navigation Corporation of New Jersey with capitalization of $15 million. In July, International Navigation Limited was formed in the UK to hold title to the remaining British flagged vessels. The company was also refinanced with a $6 million bond issue to enable Griscom to order the two new 20 knot express liners required under the US mail contract and additional new vessels for Red Star. About half of these bonds were purchased by representatives of Standard Oil. When St Louis and St Paul were delivered, the American Line had the only weekly 20 knot service on the Atlantic.

The timing for the company's expansion could not have been worse. The major shipping companies including the American Line entered into an agreement to control sailing frequency and prices. However, the agreement broke down in the fall of 1893 over a dispute between the German and British lines over Scandinavian business, resulting in a fare war. This situation was compounded by the depression of 1894 and several weaker firms including the Guion Line collapsed.

By 1896, economic conditions improved, and the major lines reached a new agreement, negotiated at International Navigation's headquarters in London. The Spanish–American War (1898) and the Boer War (1899-1902) created a shortage of shipping on the Atlantic, and the major lines launched building programs to increase their fleets. Most of the American Line's ships were requisitioned by the government for war service. Griscom also ordered new vessels and after the war refinanced the company. In 1899, J.P. Morgan underwrote $20 million in 5% bonds. $12 million was used to retire existing 6% bonds and $6 million was earmarked for expansion. By 1902, International Navigation's fleet consisted of 26 ships totaling 181,000 tons and carried more passengers than either Cunard or White Star.

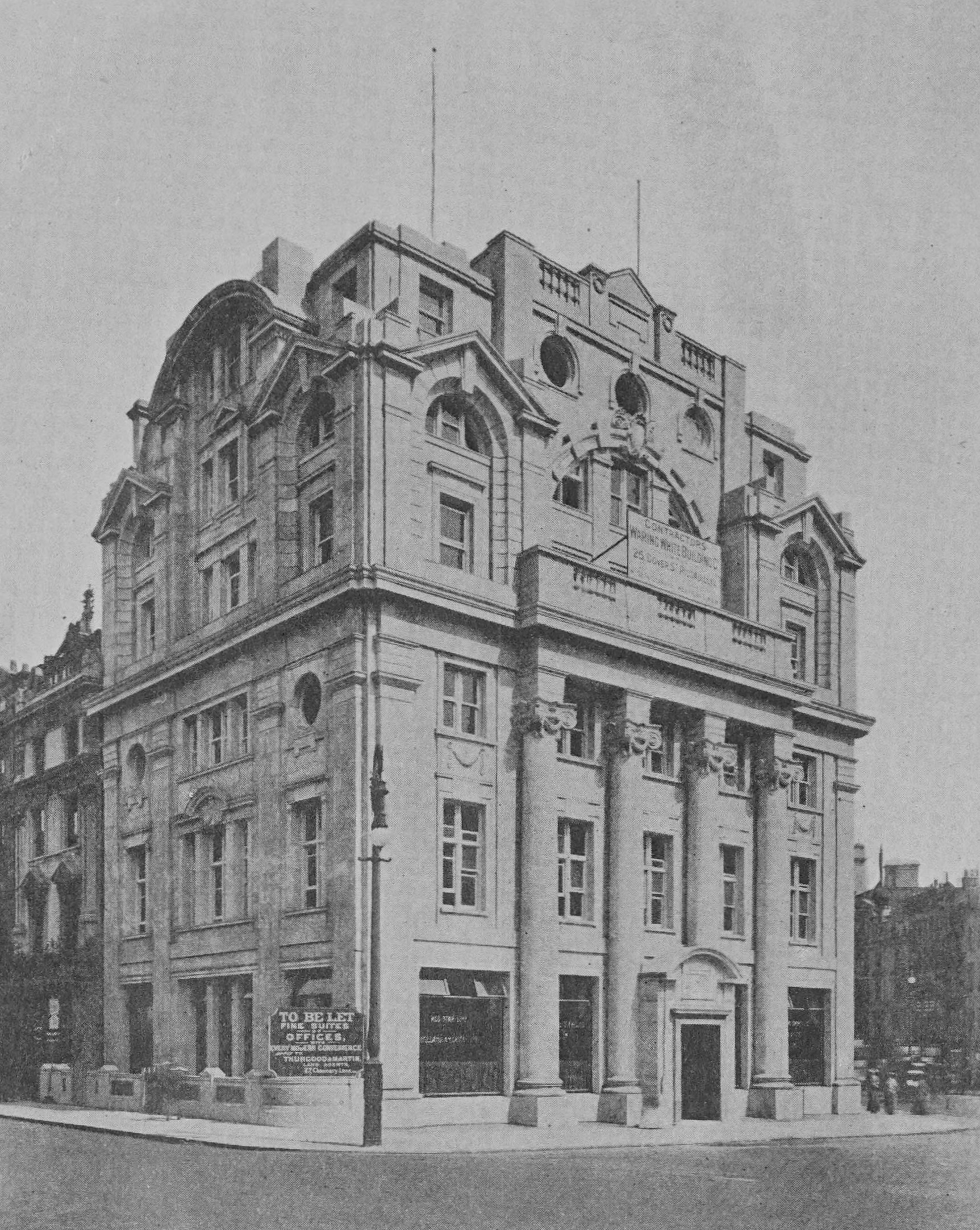
Oceanic House, the company's 1905 headquarters, designed by Henry Tanner Jr

While International Navigation's Belgian and British subsidiaries were consistently profitable, the American Line only paid its first dividend in 1900. The mail contract of $750,000 per year was not sufficient to offset the higher costs of operating US-flagged vessels. Griscom was a close associate of Ohio Senator Marcus Hanna, who stayed at Griscom's house outside Philadelphia during the 1900 Republican convention. Hanna was the power broker behind President William McKinley, and when the Republicans were reelected, Hanna pushed a new mail subsidy bill. The legislation cleared the Senate in 1902, but stalled in the House of Representatives. Congress was opposed to subsidizing rich financiers even though this meant that relatively fewer Americans were employed as merchant ship builders and sailors.

As early as the 1880s, Griscom believed that the major shipping lines should be combined into a trust to control capacity and pricing. As a result of the 1899 refinancing, he became acquainted with J. P. Morgan, the investment banker who was successful in putting together large trusts. Morgan was then in the process of building U.S. Steel, the first billion-dollar corporation. Morgan profited from the investment fees associated with creating or refinancing companies, but not actually operating the new enterprises. The timing appeared right for a large shipping merger. In 1902, another price war broke out when the Boer War ended and new vessels entered service.

Backed by financing from Morgan's syndicate, Morgan and Griscom acquired the Atlantic Transport Line, the Leyland Line, the White Star Line, the Dominion Line, and half of Holland America. When combined with International Navigation, the new company owned 118 ships totaling 810,000 tons. This represented 20% of the total shipping on the Atlantic and a third of the passenger business. They also entered into revenue sharing arrangements with Hamburg America and North German Lloyd. On October 1, 1902, Morgan and Griscom announced that International Navigation was to be reorganized as the International Mercantile Marine Corporation of New Jersey and that the firm had an initial capitalization of $120 million plus the proceeds of a $50 million bond offering. The old International Navigation was valued at $14.2 million including $2.5 million in cash and stock paid as commissions to Griscom and his close associates.

== Postscript ==
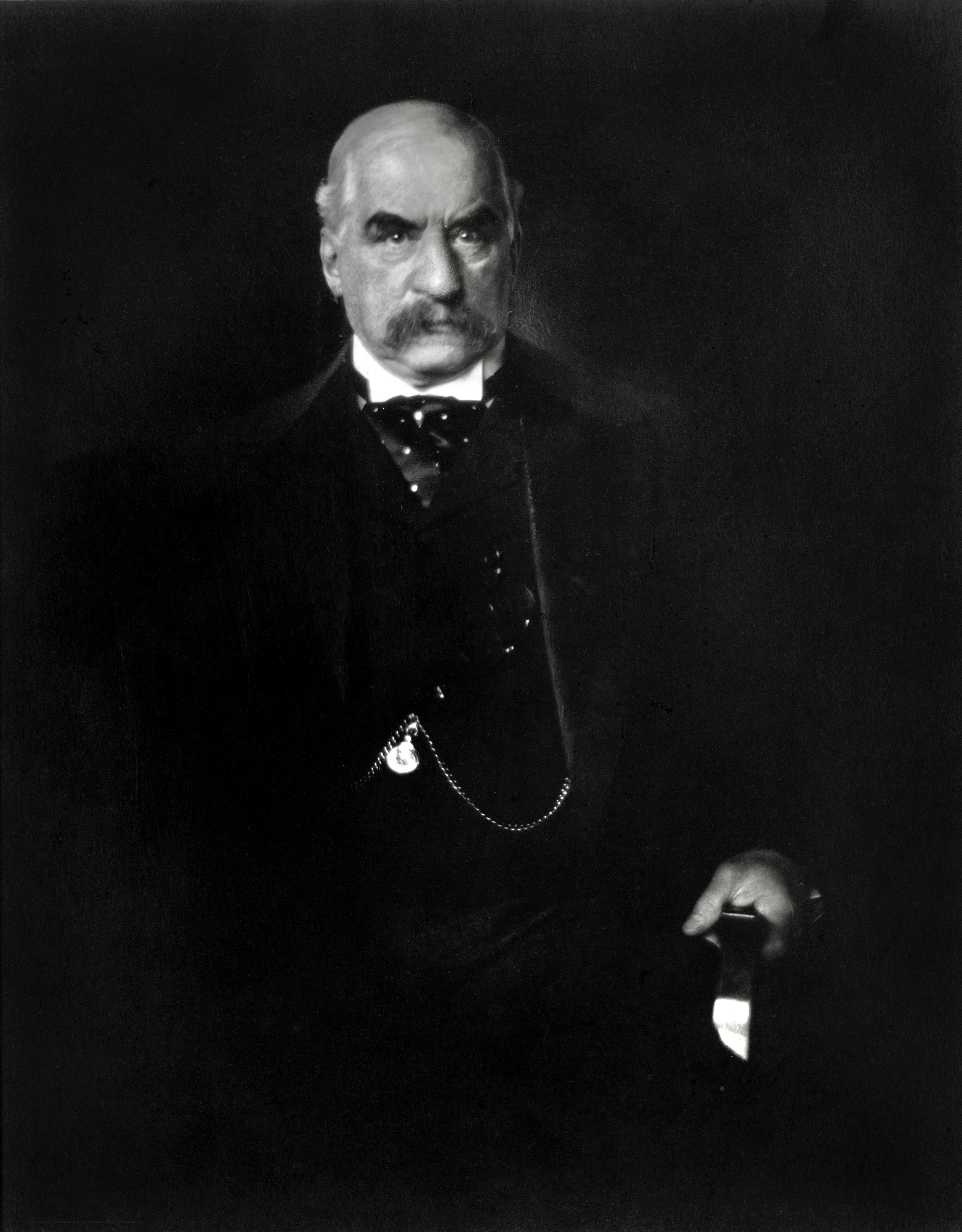
J.P. Morgan, photographed by Edward Steichen in 1903

By the end of 1903, the value of the IMM preferred stock dropped from $85 to $18 and the bonds were not selling. Morgan was unable to sell much of the stock and bonds issued to finance IMM and was forced to remain active in IMM's management. Instead of the $10 million profit he expected, he lost money on the transaction. The problem was that IMM paid too much for the companies it acquired and struggled under the debt payments. The hoped for subsidy from Congress did not materialize and the company was impacted by the economic depression that lasted through the middle of the decade. Further, the anticipated economies of scale from the merger did not materialize. In 1904, management was reorganized and IMM focused on White Star, the most profitable subsidiary. However, by 1915 the company was forced into bankruptcy court when IMM was unable to make debt service payments because the war disrupted cash flow from foreign subsidiaries. IMM survived and by 1917 profited from the demand for shipping during W.W.I.

During the 1920s and 30s, IMM sold its foreign flagged subsidiaries to focus on US operations. In 1930, the Roosevelt Steamship Company purchased 51% of IMM. The next year, Roosevelt IMM became the manager of the government owned United States Lines when the line's purchaser defaulted on the payments. In 1934, Roosevelt IMM acquired a majority of the US Line stock for $1.1 million. All US Line, Roosevelt Line and IMM operations were merged in 1943 and the combined operation used the US Line name. The US Line emerged from the war as one of the largest international shippers and in the 1950s was the second largest transatlantic passenger carrier after Cunard. Passenger sailings were terminated in 1969 when the US government withdrew the operating subsidy for the United States. The US Lines failed in 1986 when it over expanded in the container cargo business and its operations were liquidated. The shell of United States Lines emerged from bankruptcy in 1990 and eventually entered into the hotel business and is now known as Janus Hotels & Resorts.
