= W. R. Galbraith =

British civil engineer

William Robert Galbraith (7 July 1829 – 5 October 1914) was a civil engineer in the United Kingdom during the late 19th and early 20th centuries. He was employed by the London and South Western Railway as a consulting engineer for over 40 years, overseeing the design and construction of nearly all that company's new lines between 1862 and his retirement in 1907.

In 1892 he formed an engineering consultancy with R. F. Church. As Galbraith & Church they undertook numerous projects for other railways besides the LSWR, including the Baker Street and Waterloo Railway which became known as London Underground's Bakerloo line. In total he designed and oversaw the construction of over 14 miles of London's underground railways). In the 1890s Galbraith was the North British Railway's parliamentary consultant, acting as a resident expert and adviser during parliamentary hearings on the company's engineering projects).

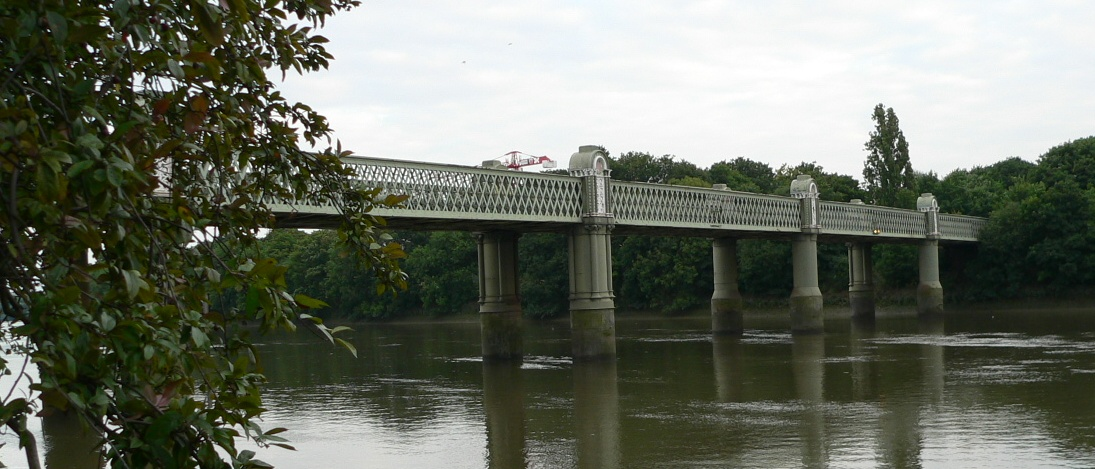
Kew Railway Bridge

The West Meon Viaduct on the Meon Valley Railway

His projects include:

- Kew Railway Bridge across the River Thames in London, built in 1864–1869 by the London and South Western Railway
- Newport Pagnell to Wolverton Branch Railway, W. R. Galbraith was director from 1871 and was mentioned in the Newport Pagnell Railway (Extension of Time and Finance) Act 1870 (33 & 34 Vict. c. xxix) as one of the creditors of the railway
- Meldon Railway Viaduct, built in 1874 by the London and South Western Railway across the West Okement river valley near Okehampton, Devon
- The Swanage Branch Line, opened in 1885
- Hockley Railway Viaduct as part of the Winchester Cheshill branch of the LSWR in 1891.
- The modernisation and expansion of Southampton Docks following their purchase by the LSWR in 1892.
- Prince of Wales Graving Dock (Southampton), opened on 3 August 1895
- The Waterloo & City line in London, opened 11 July 1898.
- The Basingstoke and Alton Light Railway, opened in 1901
- The Meon Valley Railway, built between 1898 and 1903.
- Trafalgar Graving Dock opened in 1905
- The Bakerloo line, built between 1898 and 1906
- Calstock railway viaduct across the Tamar valley, built between 1904 and 1907
