= Peregrine (horse) =

British-bred Thoroughbred racehorse

- Sire: Pero Gomez
- Grandsire: Beadsman
- Dam: Adelaide
- Damsire: Young Melbourne
- Sex: Stallion
- Foaled: 1878
- Country: United Kingdom
- Colour: Brown
- Breeder: Mr Taylor Sharpe
- Owner: Duke of Westminster
- Trainer: Robert Peck
- Record: 2: 1-1-0

Major wins
- 2000 Guineas (1881)

Peregrine (named after the peregrine falcon) (1878 – after 1898) was a British Thoroughbred racehorse and sire. His racing career was extremely brief, consisting of two races in the space of 28 days in 1881. On 4 May he was an emphatic winner of the 2000 Guineas defeating the American challenger Iroquois. He was matched against Iroquois again in the Epsom Derby and was beaten half a length into second place. A recurrent leg injury forced his retirement at the end of the year. He made little impact as a breeding stallion.

== Background ==
Peregrine was a brown horse bred in England by Mr Taylor Sharpe. He stood 16 hands high and had white markings on the heels of his hind feet. In September 1879 the yearling was offered for sale and bought for 450 guineas by the trainer Robert Peck on behalf of Hugh Grosvenor, 1st Duke of Westminster. On the death of the Duke's wife, the former Lady Constance Leveson-Gower, in 1880 many of his racehorses were put up for sale and Peregrine, then an unraced two-year-old, was reportedly sold for 700 guineas. Despite the "sale" the colt appeared to remain in the same ownership. During his racing career the colt was listed as the property of "Mr Mance", "Mr Grosvenor" and "Mr Norman", which appear to have been nom de courses of the Duke. It was reported that Mr Norman was "Capt. Robert Grosvenor, a son of the Duke of Westminster", but this seems unlikely as in 1881 the Duke's son Robert was only 12 years old. Peregrine was trained by Peck at Russley Park in Wiltshire (near Lambourn) throughout his racing career.

Peregrine was sired by Pero Gomez, winner of the 1869 St Leger and runner-up in that year’s Derby. His dam, Adelaide, is regarded as the foundation mare of Thoroughbred family 9-h.

== Racing career ==
=== 1881: three-year-old season ===
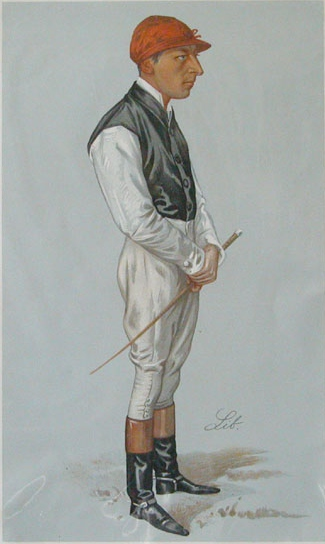
Fred Webb, Peregrine's jockey

Peregrine was unraced a two-year-old, but in the spring of 1881 he began to appear in the betting lists for both the 2000 Guineas and the Epsom Derby. On 4 May 1881 Peregrine, on his racecourse debut, was one of fourteen horses to contest the 73rd running of the 2000 Guineas over the Rowley Mile at Newmarket Racecourse. Prince Soltykoff's Scobell started the 7/2 ahead of Cameliard, Golden Plover and Tristan with Peregrine, ridden by Fred Webb next in the betting on 15/2. The filly Wandering Nun delayed the start by refusing to line up with her male opponents but started well and led the field before giving way to Lennoxlove who was in turn overtaken by the American-bred outsider Iroquois two furlongs from the finish. Peregine, who had not been among the early leaders moved into contention at about the same stage and then began to make rapid progress down the centre of the course. He moved up alongside the American colt approaching the final furlong and drew away in the closing stages to win "very easily" by three lengths from the American-bred Iroquois with the 100/1 outsider Don Fulano finishing a length and a half back in third.

Peregrine was stepped up in distance for the Derby Stakes over one and a half miles at Epsom Racecourse on 1 June 1881. With Webb again in the saddle he was made the 6/5 favourite ahead of fourteen opponents headed by Iroquois. After being restrained towards the middle of the field, Peregrine moved up into contention on the inside rail on the final turn and as he took the lead entering the final furlong he looked likely to win easily. Iroquois however, produced a strong late rush and Peregrine was beaten half a length in a "splendid" finish. Shortly after the race it was reported that Peregrine had been bought for 7,000 guineas by Lord Alington.

Peregrine was strongly fancied for the St Leger at Doncaster Racecourse in September but was withdrawn ("scratched") from the race on 18 August after he aggravated a pre-existing foreleg injury in a training gallop.

== Stud record ==
Peregrine spent most of his stud career in France. He was not a success as a breeding stallion, with the best of his offspring probably being the filly La Pernelle, who finished second in the Grand Critérium. Peregrine died of a heart condition.

== Pedigree ==
Pedigree of Peregrine (GB), brown stallion, 1878
Sire Pero Gomez (GB) 1866	Beadsman; 1855	Weatherbit	Sheet Anchor
Sire Pero Gomez (GB) 1866	Beadsman; 1855	Weatherbit	Miss Letty
Sire Pero Gomez (GB) 1866	Beadsman; 1855	Mendicant	Touchstone
Sire Pero Gomez (GB) 1866	Beadsman; 1855	Mendicant	Lady Moore Carew
Sire Pero Gomez (GB) 1866	Salamanca; 1859	Student	Chatham
Sire Pero Gomez (GB) 1866	Salamanca; 1859	Student	Laurel mare
Sire Pero Gomez (GB) 1866	Salamanca; 1859	Bravery	Gameboy
Sire Pero Gomez (GB) 1866	Salamanca; 1859	Bravery	Ennui
Dam Adelaide (GB) 1866 (Family 9-h)	Young Melbourne; 1855	Melbourne	Humphrey Clinker
Dam Adelaide (GB) 1866 (Family 9-h)	Young Melbourne; 1855	Melbourne	Cervantes mare
Dam Adelaide (GB) 1866 (Family 9-h)	Young Melbourne; 1855	Clarissa	Pantaloon
Dam Adelaide (GB) 1866 (Family 9-h)	Young Melbourne; 1855	Clarissa	Glencoe mare
Dam Adelaide (GB) 1866 (Family 9-h)	Teddington mare 1855	Teddington	Orlando
Dam Adelaide (GB) 1866 (Family 9-h)	Teddington mare 1855	Teddington	Miss Twickenham
Dam Adelaide (GB) 1866 (Family 9-h)	Teddington mare 1855	Maid of Masham	Don John
Dam Adelaide (GB) 1866 (Family 9-h)	Teddington mare 1855	Maid of Masham	Miss Lydia
