= Prince of Wales Graving Dock (Southampton) =

Old graving dock in Southampton, United Kingdom

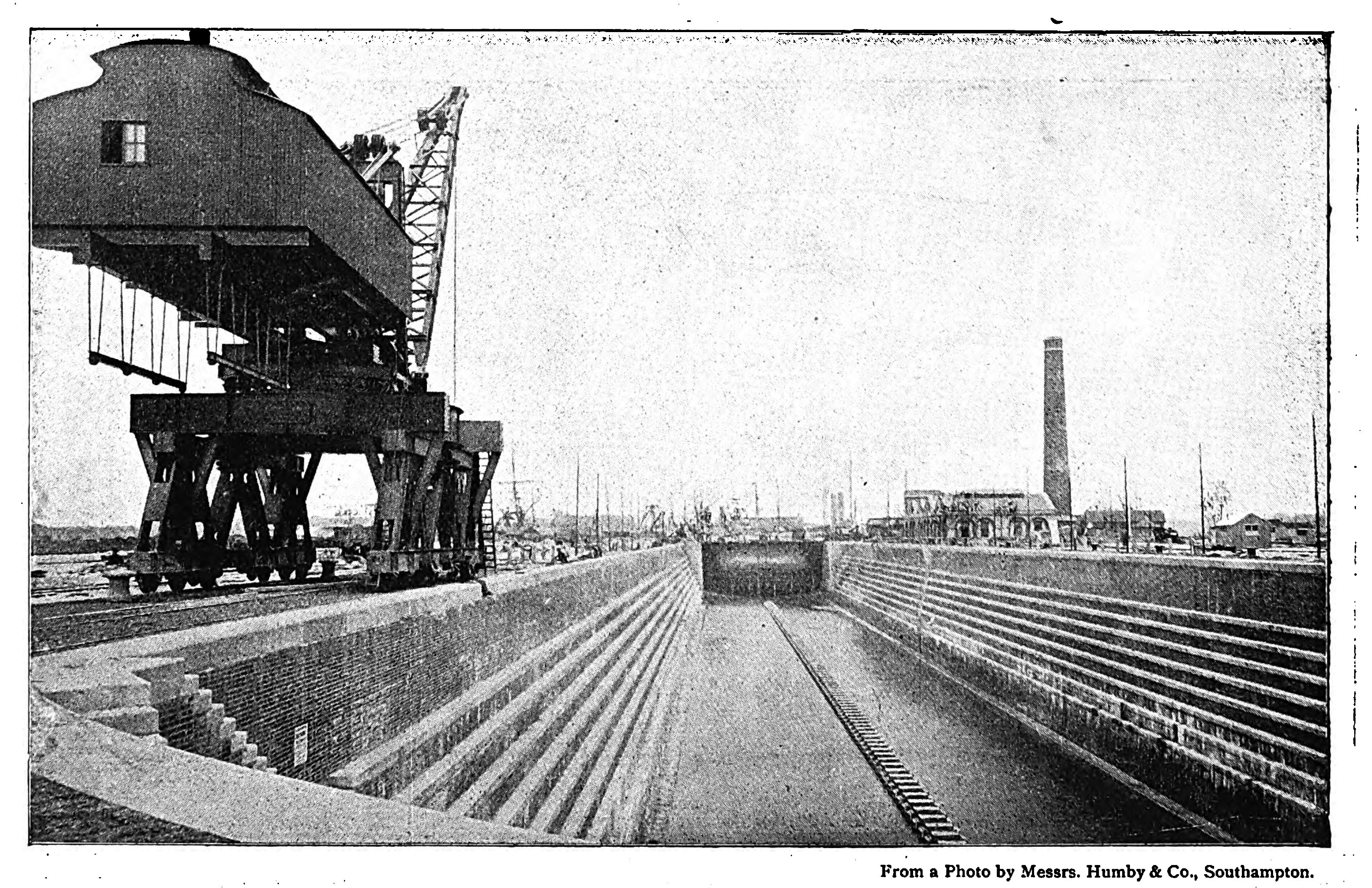
- Prince of Wales Graving Dock in Southampton shortly after completion

History

United Kingdom
- Name: Prince of Wales Graving Dock
- Christened: 3 August 1895
- Completed: 2 August 1895
- Decommissioned: 1978
- Home port: Southampton; maps 50.887704°N 1.394493°W

General characteristics (as completed)
- Length: 750 ft (228.6 m) (floor)
- Beam: Entrance: 87 ft 6 in (26.7 m) (sill); 91 ft (27.7 m) (coping); Dock proper: 87 ft 6 in (26.7 m) (floor); 112 ft 5 in (34.3 m) (coping)
- Draft: 32 ft 6 in (9.9 m) (HWOST); 29 ft (8.8 m) (HWNT)

Prince of Wales Graving Dock in Southampton was at one time the largest dry dock in the world. It opened in 1895, and was also known as 'Prince of Wales Dry Dock' or 'Dry Dock No 5'. For some years, it serviced many famous ocean liners. As these became bigger, it took a less prominent role.

Prince of Wales Dry Dock was filled in during 1978. This had to do with a local reduction in demand for dry docking; The dock being outdated; and the port having good use for the grounds that it occupied. Only the entrance from Empress Dock is now still visible.

== Context ==
Geography made Southampton a very good harbor. However, a good harbor needs facilities to become a port. In 1840, the London and Southampton Railway connected Southampton to London. This made it feasible to develop the required port infrastructure in Southampton. The municipality itself developed some modest facilities.

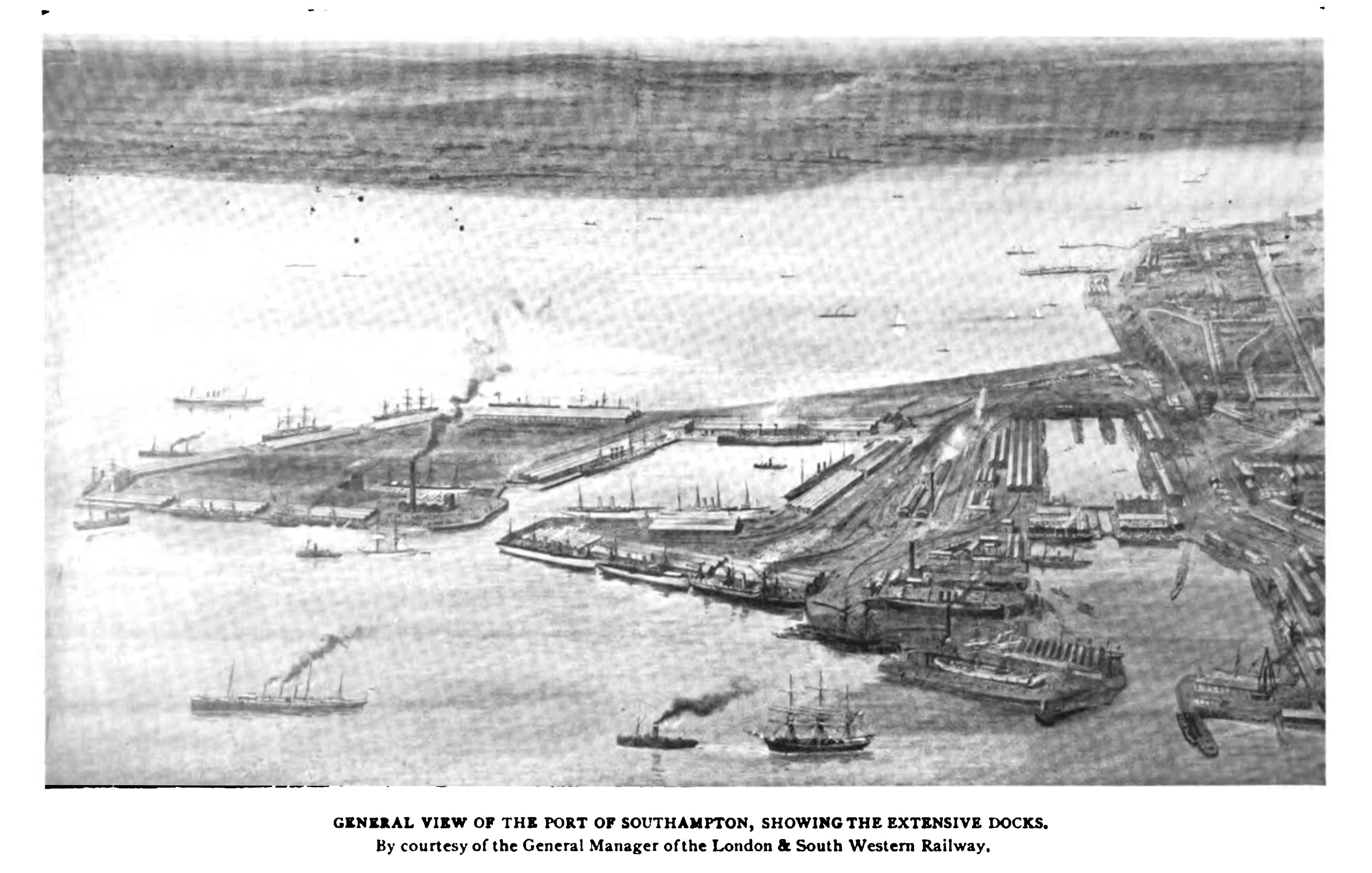
Southampton Docks c. 1895

The Southampton Dock Company developed the more important Southampton Docks east of the town quay. These consisted of docks that facilitated loading and unloading. Another necessity to persuade shipping companies to call at Southampton was the availability of a dry dock. The company opened its first dock, the Open Dock in 1843. It was followed by the inner dock, and four dry docks. In 1892, it opened Empress Dock at a cost of 300,000 GBP. It gave the three shipping lines that used this dock the unique advantage that they could even dock at dead low water, which could not be done in any other British port.

At about the same time, it became clear that the Southampton Dock Company lacked the capital to make the required further investments. This led to it being bought by the London and South Western Railway. One of the required investments was the construction of a dry dock that could serve the American ocean liners that had made Southampton their British terminus. This would become Prince of Wales Graving Dock.

== Construction ==
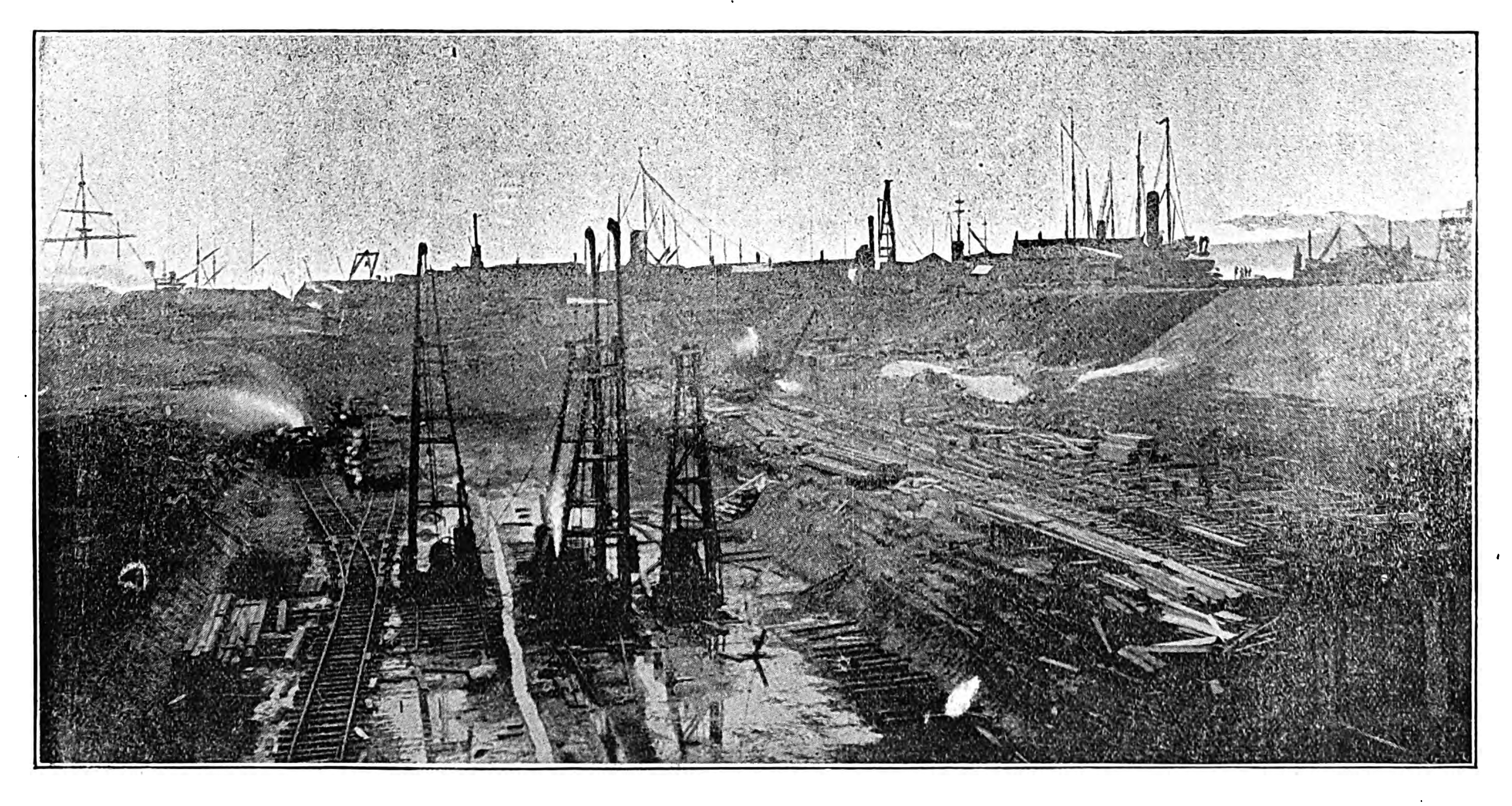
Under construction c. 1893

The design for Prince of Wales dry Dock was made by W. R. Galbraith, consulting engineer of the London and South Western Railway and Mr. Church. The work was contracted by Messrs. Lucas and Aird. Construction took about two years and involved countless machines and about 1,150 men.

The area where the dock was to be made had to be reclaimed from the estuary. It was first enclosed by an enclosing chalk bank. This bank was completed in August 1893 or earlier. The area within was then drained. Four pumps jointly pumped out about 3,500 gallons of water per minute to keep the construction trenches dry enough.

Construction in the weak and moist grounds was challenging. First of all, steam pile drivers had to drive in a huge number of piles as part of the foundation. The walls were built in trenches that required very heavy timbering. In some cases this was as much as two cubic feet per yard excavated. Finally Portland cement was poured in to create a huge concrete box.

The last step was to create the entrance from Empress Dock to the dry dock. This was a complex operation described by Francis Wentworth-Sheilds. E.g. the still relatively new quay wall of Empress Dock had to be supported by beams while the earth behind it was removed to extend the floor of the dock. The last task was to actually dismantle the concrete wall of the dock. This was done by drilling and placing small explosives. It took 7.5 weeks.

On 2 August 1895, Mr. John Dixon laid the last stone of the Dock. On 3 August 1895, the dock was officially opened. After that, the work to fully clear the entrance continued by submarine blasting. Due to many interruptions, this was not finally completed until January 1896.

== Characteristics ==
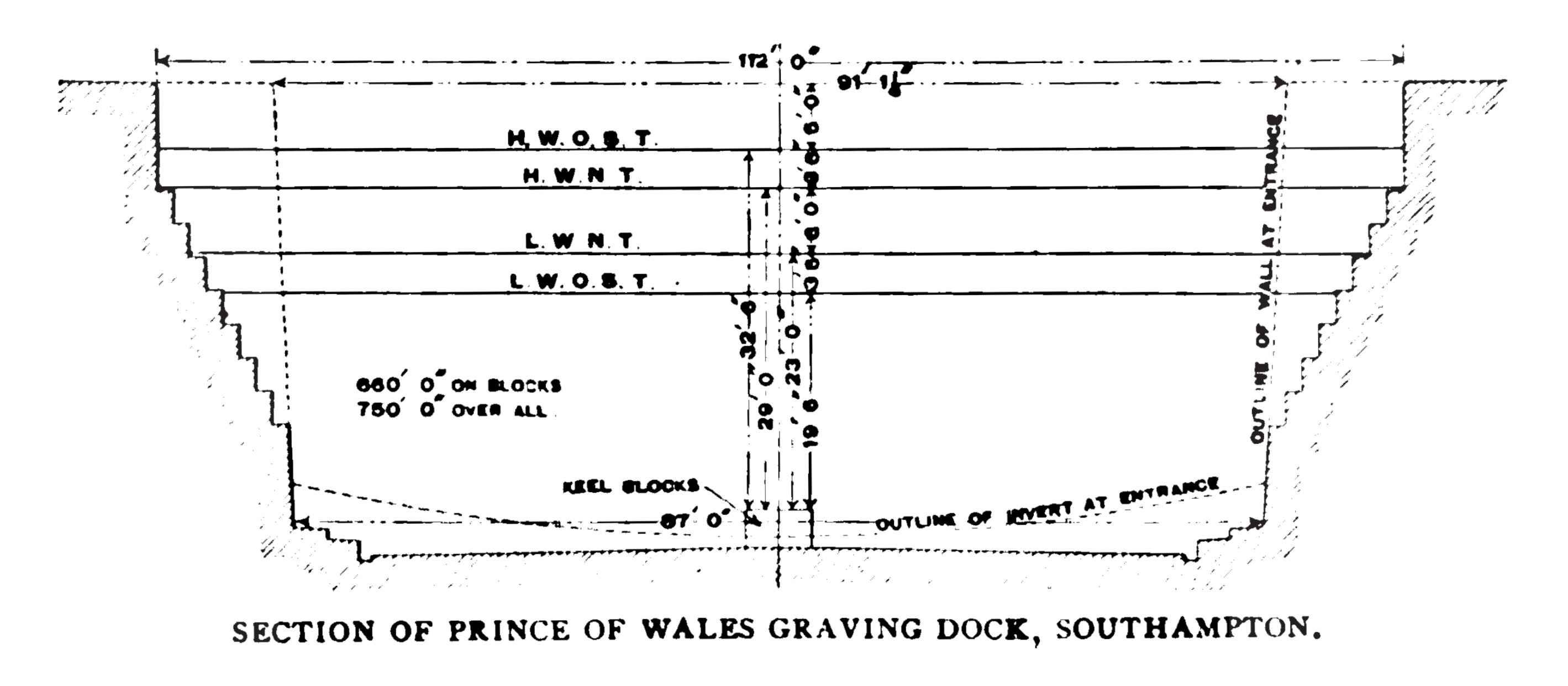
Cross section with tides.

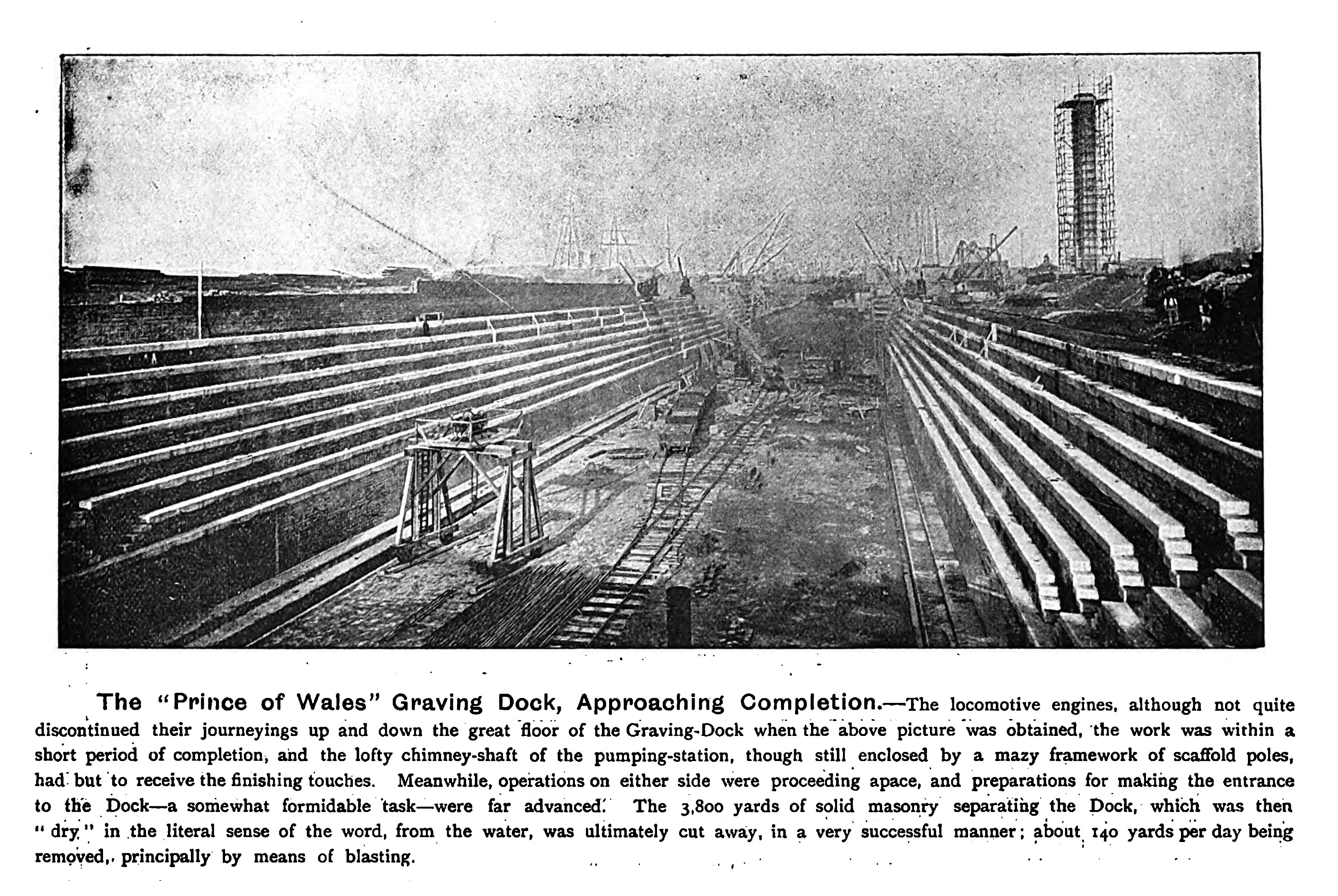
Almost completed, 1895

Prince of Wales Dock resembled a large rectangular area dug out of the earth. In fact, the soft watery ground of the area called for the construction of a very strong box-like structure. Thick walls were needed to keep them from collapsing and especially to keep the floor from breaking under the weight of a ship. The whole had to be watertight to prevent the surrounding earth from getting hollowed out by water passing in or out of the box.

The walls and invert of the dock were made of Portland cement faced with brick. The caisson bedding and facing of the lock heads were made of Cornish granite patent axed. The foundation of the walls reached 53 ft (16.2 m) below cope level. The foundation of the floor started 59 ft (18.0 m) below coping level.

The dock was closed by a ship caisson built by Rennie & Co. of Greenwich. This carried a road and railway from the Empress Dock to the Itchen New Quays. West of the entrance, there was a recess were the caisson was moored when ship moved in or out of the dock. There were hydraulic capstans to move a ship that was afloat in the dock. This also drove a moving crane that could lift 30 tons.

The pump house was connected to the docks' hydraulic power network, this drove several machines. To empty the dock, the pump house had four Galloway boilers with room for two more. These were 30 ft (9.1 m) long with a diameter of 7 ft 6 in (2.3 m). A 120 ft (36.6 m) high chimney provided increased draught.

The pump well was nearly 90 ft^{2} (8.4 m^{2}) and 58 ft (17.7 m) deep. Two Gwynne's 48-inch (1,200 mm) 'Invincible' pumps capable of delivering 112,000 imperial gallons (510,000 L; 135,000 US gal) a minute would empty the dock. The discharge culverts were 8 ft (2.4 m) by 6 ft 9 in (2.1 m) in diameter. All valves and sluice were operated by hydraulic power. At high water neap tide, the capacity of the dock was about 14.5 million gallons of water. With a ship in, it could be emptied in 1.5 to 2 hours.

Prince of Wales Dock had a length at floor level of 750 ft (228.6 m), but the design allowed for an extension to 1,000 ft (304.8 m) if required.

The entrance of the dock was slightly V-shaped to make a good fit for the ship caisson. Its width was 91 ft (27.7 m) at the top and 87 ft 6 in (26.7 m) on the sill. The width of the dock proper was the same at the floor, but was 112 ft 5 in (34.3 m) at the coping level. This had to do with the absence of shoring altars at the entrance.

The depth on the blocks was 32 ft 6 in (9.9 m) at High Water Ordinary Spring Tide (H.W.O.S.T). At High Water Neap Tide (H.W.N.T.), it was 29 ft (8.8 m).

== Service ==
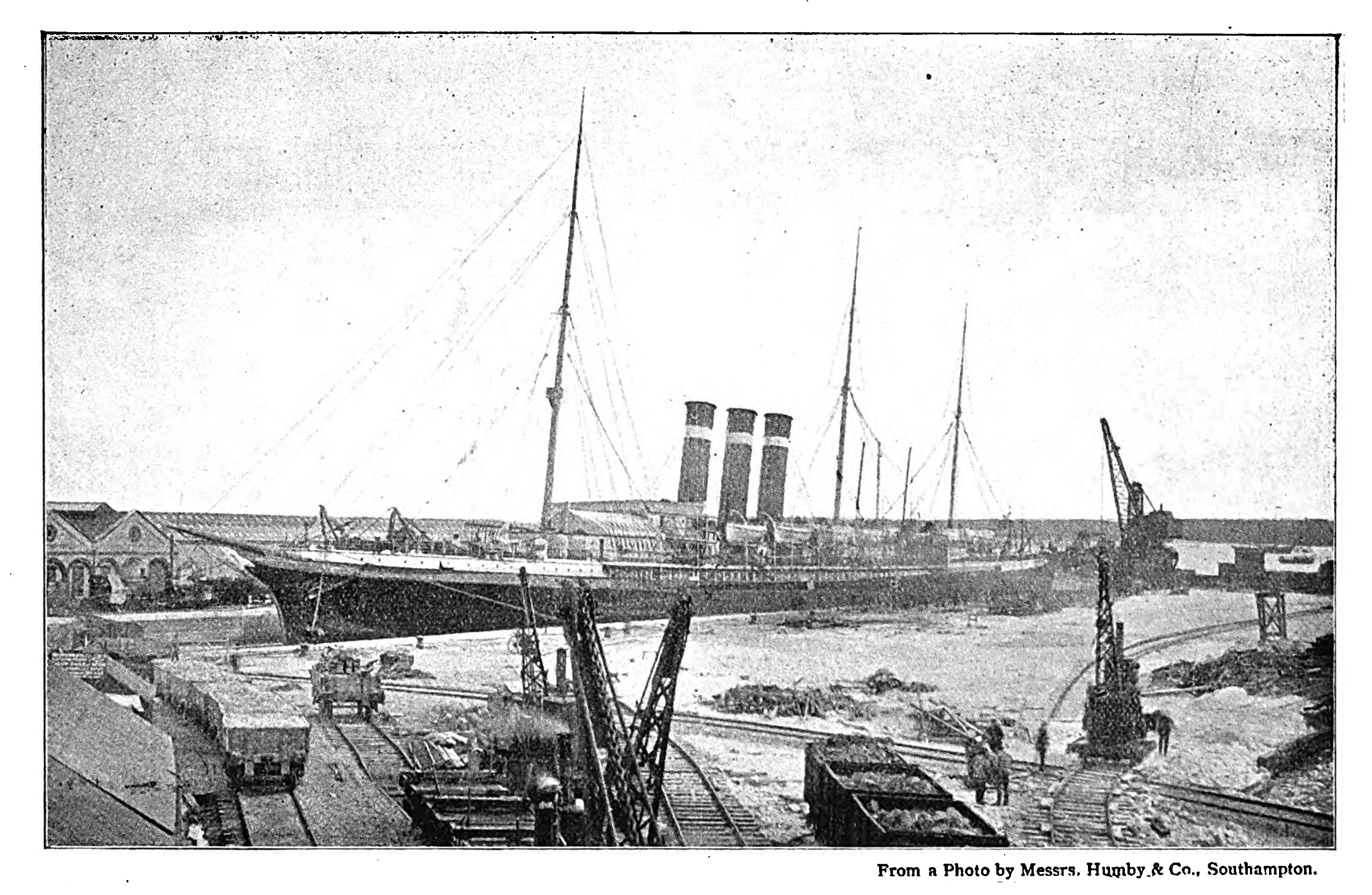
SS Paris in the dry dock seen from the caisson end

Prince of Wales Graving Dock was opened by the Prince of Wales, later Edward VII on 3 August 1895. It was the first of the Southampton dry docks to be named, instead of receiving only a number.

SS City of Paris was the first ship to be serviced by the new dry dock. In fact, she was brought in while work on breaking away the wall of Empress Dock was not yet completed. She was followed by SS St. Louis. These both belonged to the American Line, which was so important for Southampton. Work on the entrance was then resumed when the operation of the dock permitted it.

Upon completion in August 1895, Prince of Wales Dock was the largest dry dock of the world. It did not hold on to that position for very long, but it could continue to claim to be the deepest dry dock in the world. However, even that claim was cancelled when the Southampton Dock Company took nearby Trafalgar Graving Dock into use in 1911.

Starting in about 1914, Prince of Wales Dry Dock played a secondary role at Southampton while Trafalgar Dry Dock serviced the biggest ocean liners. In 1924, the arrival of the even bigger Southampton Floating Dock put Prince of Wales Dock in third place. Finally, in 1934, the still larger King George V dry dock or No. 7 was taken into use.

== The end ==
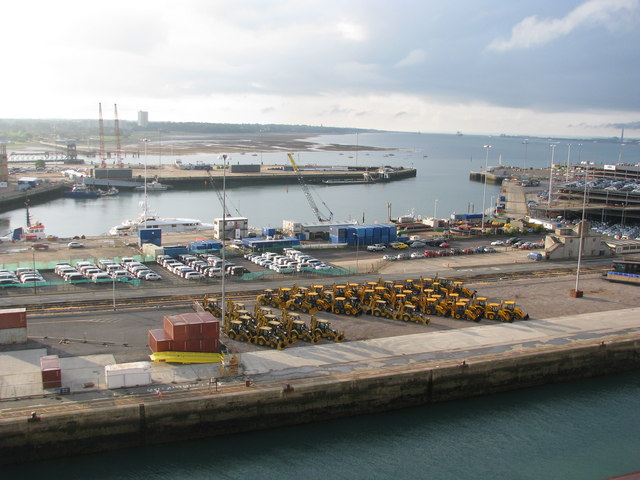
The entrance from Empress Dock is still visible, 2010

When Prince of Wales Dry Dock was built, the British shipbuilding industry annually produced about 75% of the world's ships. After a period of decline, this industry collapsed in the late 1960s. At that time, the percentage of new British ships that had been built abroad had increased to 74%. This of course reduced the ship builders' demand for dry dock capacity.

In ship repair and maintenance, demand for dry dock capacity also decreased. The first reason for this was the decline in cross-channel and coast-wise shipping. The second reason was the development of new anti-fouling paints that reduced the need to regularly scrape marine growth from hulls. Finally, the port could make good use of the area occupied by the dry docks. In the 1960s, Dry Docks no. 1–3 were filled up to facilitate roll-on roll-off traffic. Prince of Wales dry dock was filled up to gain space for the traffic in vehicles.

The filling-up of Prince of Wales Dry Dock seems to have happened in 1978. On the 2010 photo of Empress Dock, the entrance to Prince of Wales Dry Dock is still visible. This on the southern (right) side inside the entrance to Empress Dock. A small part of the reces for the ship caisson is also still open.
