= SS St. Louis (1894) =

American transatlantic passenger liner

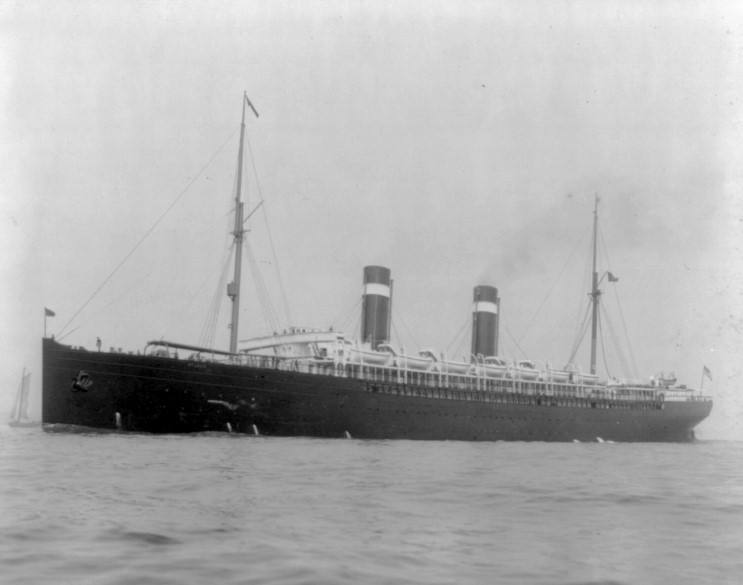
- St. Louis seen off New York in 1900.

History

United States
- Name: St. Louis
- Owner: International Navigation Company
- Operator: American Line
- Route: New York City–Southampton; New York City–Liverpool
- Builder: William Cramp & Sons, Philadelphia
- Yard number: 277
- Launched: 12 November 1894
- In service: 1895
- Out of service: 1918
- Homeport: New York City
- Fate: Burned and scuttled January 1920; Scrapped 1925

United States
- Name: USS St. Louis
- Commissioned: 24 April 1898
- Decommissioned: 2 September 1898
- Fate: Returned to owners 1898

United States
- Name: USS Louisville
- Acquired: 17 April 1918
- Commissioned: 24 April 1918
- Decommissioned: 9 September 1919
- Fate: Returned to owners 1919

General characteristics
- Type: Passenger ship / Auxiliary cruiser / Troopship
- Displacement: 14,910 long tons (15,149 t)
- Length: 554 ft (169 m)
- Beam: 63 ft (19 m)
- Draft: 30 ft (9.1 m)
- Speed: 20 knots (37 km/h; 23 mph)
- Complement: 377
- Armament: In 1898 : 4 × 5 in (127 mm) rapid fire guns; 8 × 6-pounder guns; In 1918 : 3 × 6 in (152 mm) guns

Service record
- Operations: Spanish–American War; Battle of Santiago de Cuba; World War I; Action of 30 May 1917

SS St. Louis was a passenger liner built in 1894 and sponsored by Frances Cleveland, the wife of Grover Cleveland. She entered merchant service in 1895, operating between New York and Southampton, England. St. Louis was registered in the United States and owned by the International Navigation Company of New York City. She was acquired by the U.S. Navy during both the Spanish–American War (when she was renamed USS St. Louis) and World War I (when she was renamed USS Louisville). (Note: Louisville was chosen as a name so as not to confuse this ship with the cruiser USS St. Louis (C-20).) After the ship reverted to its original name in 1919, she caught fire and was scrapped in Genoa in 1924.

== Service history ==
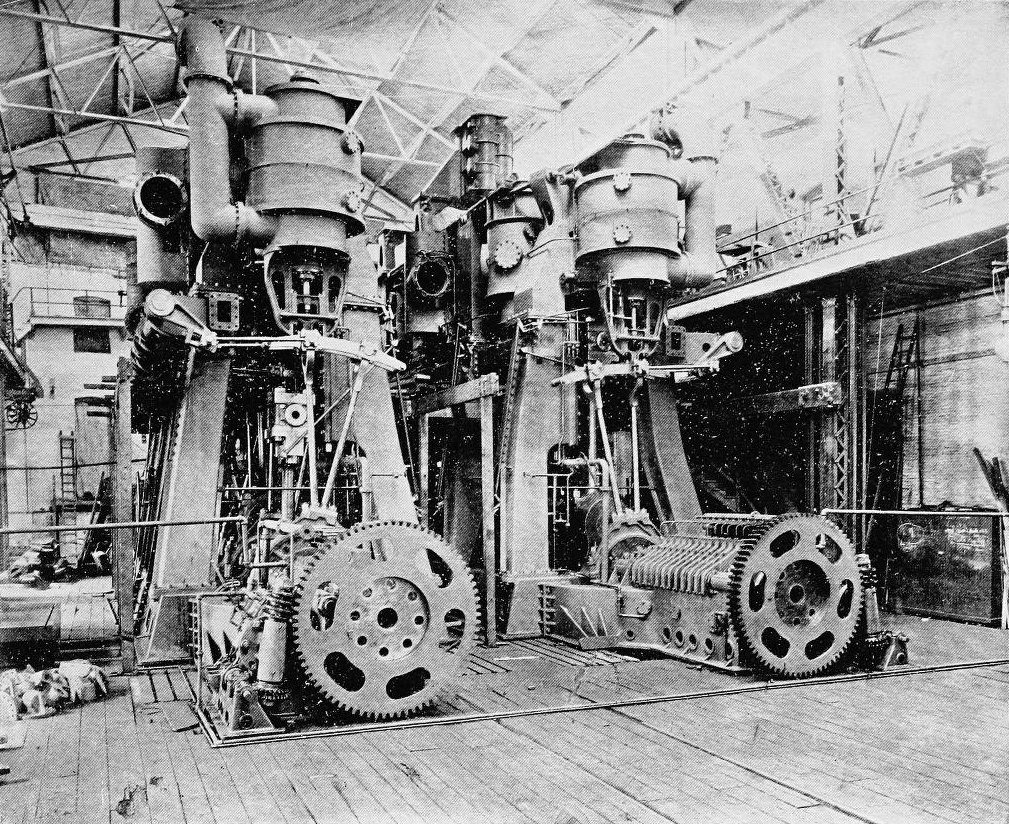
Quadruple expansion engines of St. Louis in the Cramp workshop where they were built

=== Service to Southampton ===
Shortly before St. Louis was put into service, the American Line made Southampton its UK destination. The Southampton Docks Company facilitated this change by building Prince of Wales Graving Dock. In 1895, St. Louis was the second ship to use this dry dock, the largest in the world. The dock was important for the line, because otherwise its ships would have to go to Tilbury to find a suitable dry dock.

=== Spanish–American War ===
On a later voyage following the outbreak of the Spanish–American War, St. Louis was chartered for United States Navy service while at Southampton and returned to New York on 22 April 1898. Armed with four 5-inch (127 mm) rapid-fire guns and eight 6-pounders, she was commissioned in the U.S. Navy as an auxiliary cruiser on 24 April 1898 with Captain Caspar F. Goodrich in command. St. Louis, crewed by 27 officers and 350 men, departed on 30 April 1898 for the Caribbean.

St. Louis was specially outfitted with heavy drag lines in order to destroy undersea cable communications in the West Indies and to the mainland of South America. On 13 May, the ship severed a cable between St. Thomas and San Juan, and on 18 May engaged in gunfire with the Morro Castle batteries at Santiago de Cuba while cutting another cable. When Admiral Pascual Cervera's fleet sailed into Santiago Harbor, the Spanish warships found themselves cut off from direct communications with Spain.

St. Louis next severed the cable between Guantanamo Bay and Haiti; then cut the cable off Cienfuegos to isolate Cuba from outside communications. She joined in the bombardment of fortifications at Caimanera in Guantanamo Bay on 3 June; captured a Spanish merchant ship on the 10th; intercepted two British ships bound for Cuba - the Twickenham on 10 June and Wary on 1 July; and was present at the Battle of Santiago de Cuba on 3 July when the Spanish Fleet was destroyed while trying to force its way to sea.

St. Louis received many prisoners of war, including Admiral Cervera, for internment in the United States and landed them at Portsmouth, N.H., on 11 July. She steamed south from Norfolk on the 28th to cruise among ports of Puerto Rico and Cuba until 10 August; then sailed for New York where she arrived on the 14th. She shifted to Philadelphia on 24 August to enter the Cramp shipyard for preparation for return to her owners. St. Louis was decommissioned on 2 September and was turned over to Mr. J. Parker, a representative of the American Lines.

=== World War I ===
For many years, SS St. Louis was prominent as a passenger liner between New York and Liverpool. For example, in June 1906, the newly married Alice Roosevelt Longworth sailed on the ship for her first trip to Europe. On 17 March 1917, she was provided with an armed guard of 26 sailors and equipped with three 6-inch guns to defend against enemy attack on her New York-to-Liverpool service route. On 30 May, while proceeding up the Irish Sea and skirting the coast of England, she responded rapidly to the orders, "Hard Starboard," at the sighting of a periscope, and succeeded in dodging a torpedo while apparently striking the submarine which fired it. Later dry-dock examination revealed that 18 feet of her keel rubbing strake had been torn away. On 25 July, her gunners exchanged fire with a surfaced U-boat, some three miles away, and sighted many near misses.

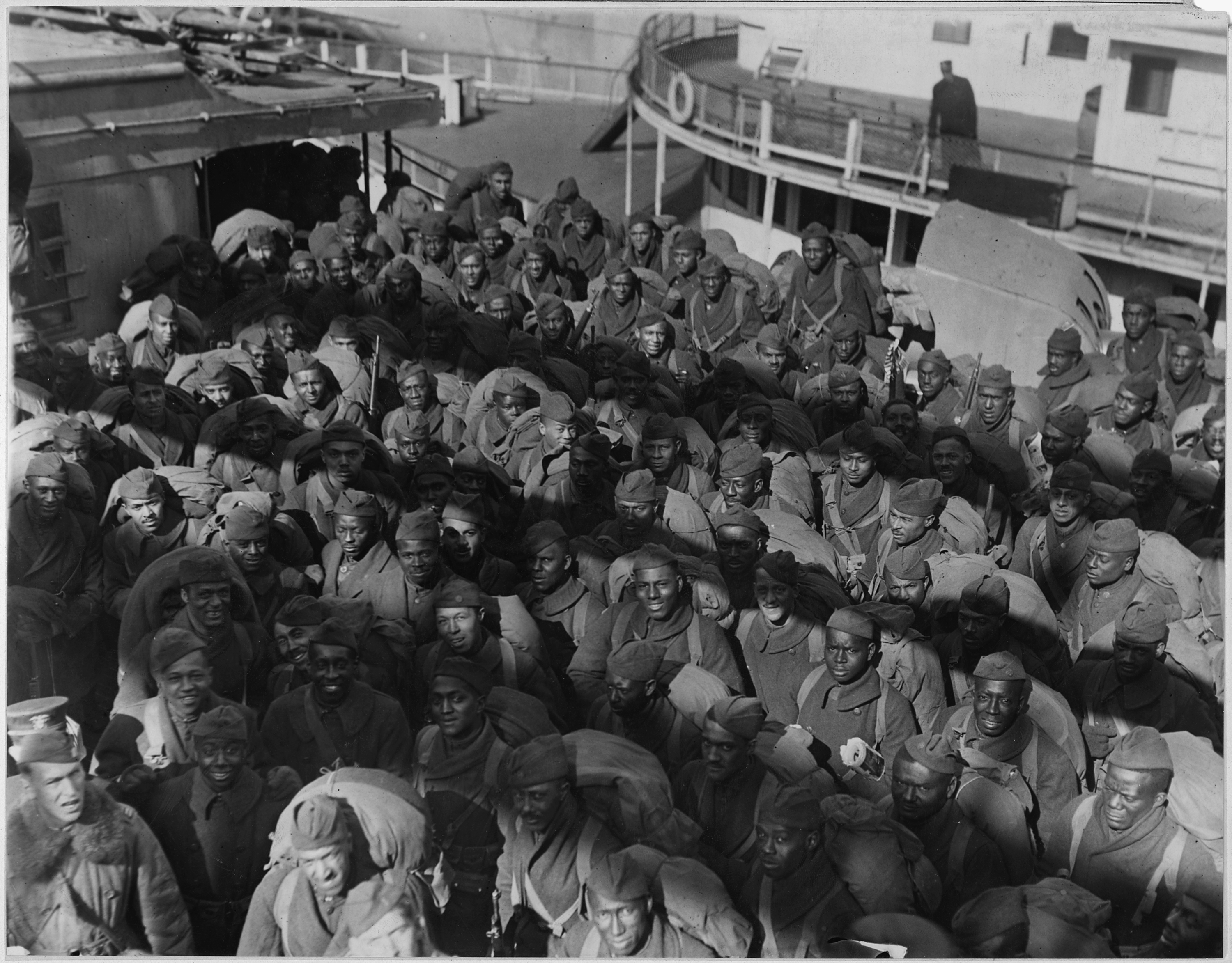
351st Field Artillery troops on the deck of the Louisville, Feb. 17, 1919

On 17 April 1918, St. Louis was delivered to the Navy at New York to be wholly manned and operated by the Navy as a troop transport. She was renamed Louisville (SP-1644) to avoid confusion with the heavy cruiser St. Louis. Louisville was commissioned on 24 April.

Louisville first put to sea on 12 October bound for Portland and Southampton, England, and returned to New York on 7 January 1919. From then until 19 August of that year, she made six voyages from New York to Liverpool or to Brest, France, to return American soldiers from the Great War. On 20 August, she shifted to Norfolk and was decommissioned there on 9 September 1919. She was returned to her owner on the 11th and resumed her original name, St. Louis.

== Destruction ==
On 8 January 1920, while St. Louis was being reconditioned as a passenger liner in Hoboken, N.J., a workman's blowtorch ignited a fire. The fire raged into the next day, 9 January. When the fire could not be controlled, the ship was scuttled at the dock and allowed to burn. The only thing left after the fire was her steel hull. Damages were estimated at $1 million. She was later refloated and taken over by insurance underwriters. Over the next five years, under ownership of various investors, she lay at docks in different parts of New York Harbor. Finally, she was sold in 1925; and two Dutch tugs towed her to Italy where she was scrapped by an Italian salvage company.
