= Prince Victor of Thurn and Taxis =

Prince Victor
- Born: 18 January 1876; Ecska
- Died: 28 January 1928 (aged 52); Vienna, Austria
- Spouse: Lida Nicolls
Names
- German: Viktor Theodor Maximilian Egon Maria Lamoral
- House: Thurn and Taxis
- Father: Prince Egon Maximilian of Thurn and Taxis
- Mother: Viktoria Edelspacher de Gyoryok

Prince Victor of Thurn and Taxis (German: Viktor Theodor Maximilian Egon Maria Lamoral Prinz von Thurn und Taxis; 18 January 1876, Ecska – 28 January 1928, Vienna, Austria) was a member of the elder, main branch of the Princely House of Thurn and Taxis.

== Family ==
Prince Victor, who was born in 1876, was the youngest child of the late Prince Egon Maximilian of Thurn und Taxis and his wife, Viktoria Edelspacher de Gyoryok.

On 1 November 1911, Prince Victor married Mrs. Gerald Fitzgerald, Born Lida Eleanor Nicolls in 1875 in Uniontown, Pennsylvania, she was the daughter of grocer John Albert Nicolls and his wife Lenora Markle Nicolls, née Thompson. Mrs. Fitzgerald's first husband was Gerald Fitzgerald of Ireland. She returned to the United States from England last Friday. She was born Lida Eleonor Nicholls in 1875 in Uniontown. Lida married her first husband, Irish-born General Gerald Purcell Fitzgerald in Los Angeles in late 1899.

== Life ==
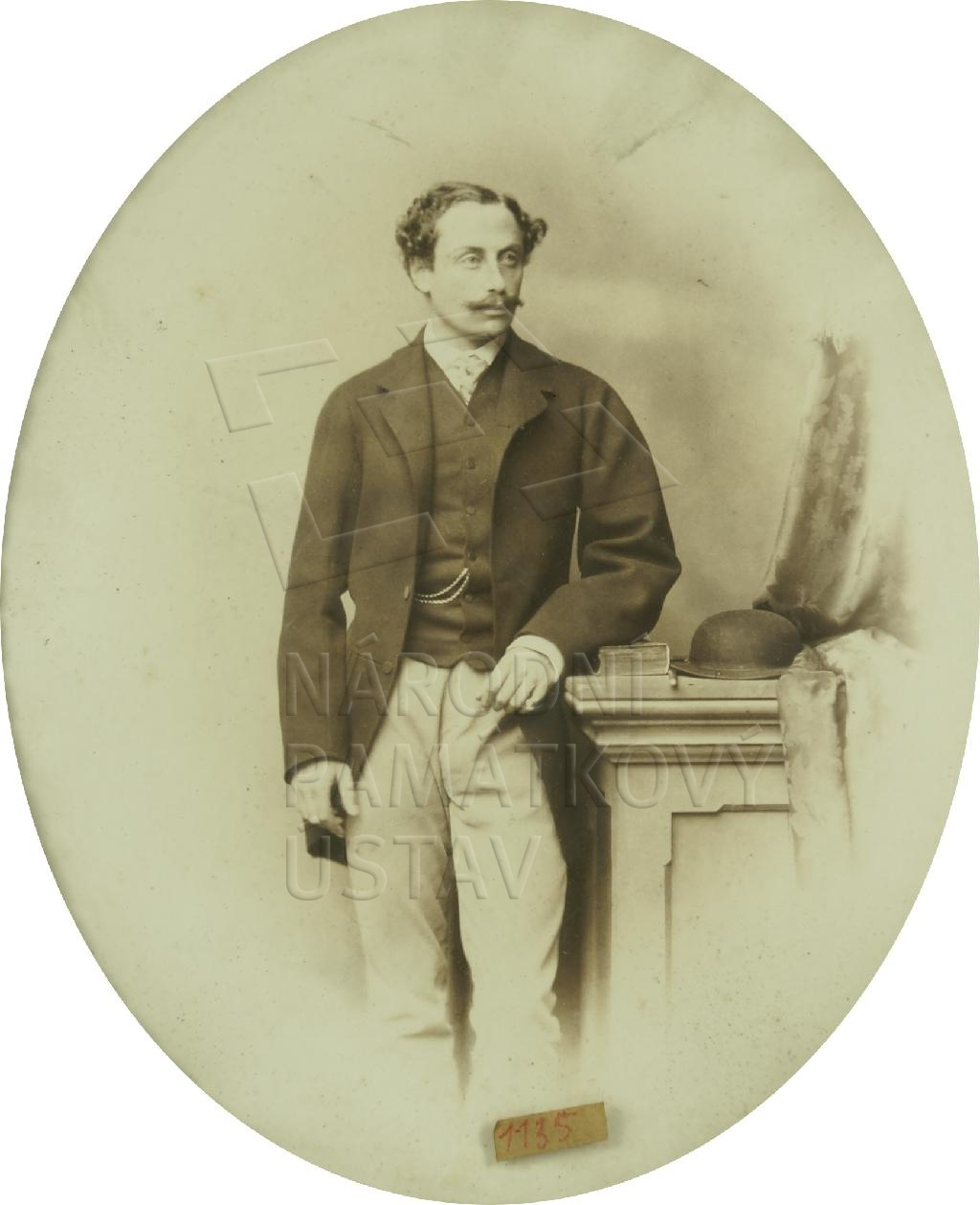
Victor's father: Prince Egon von Thund und Taxis (1832-1892)

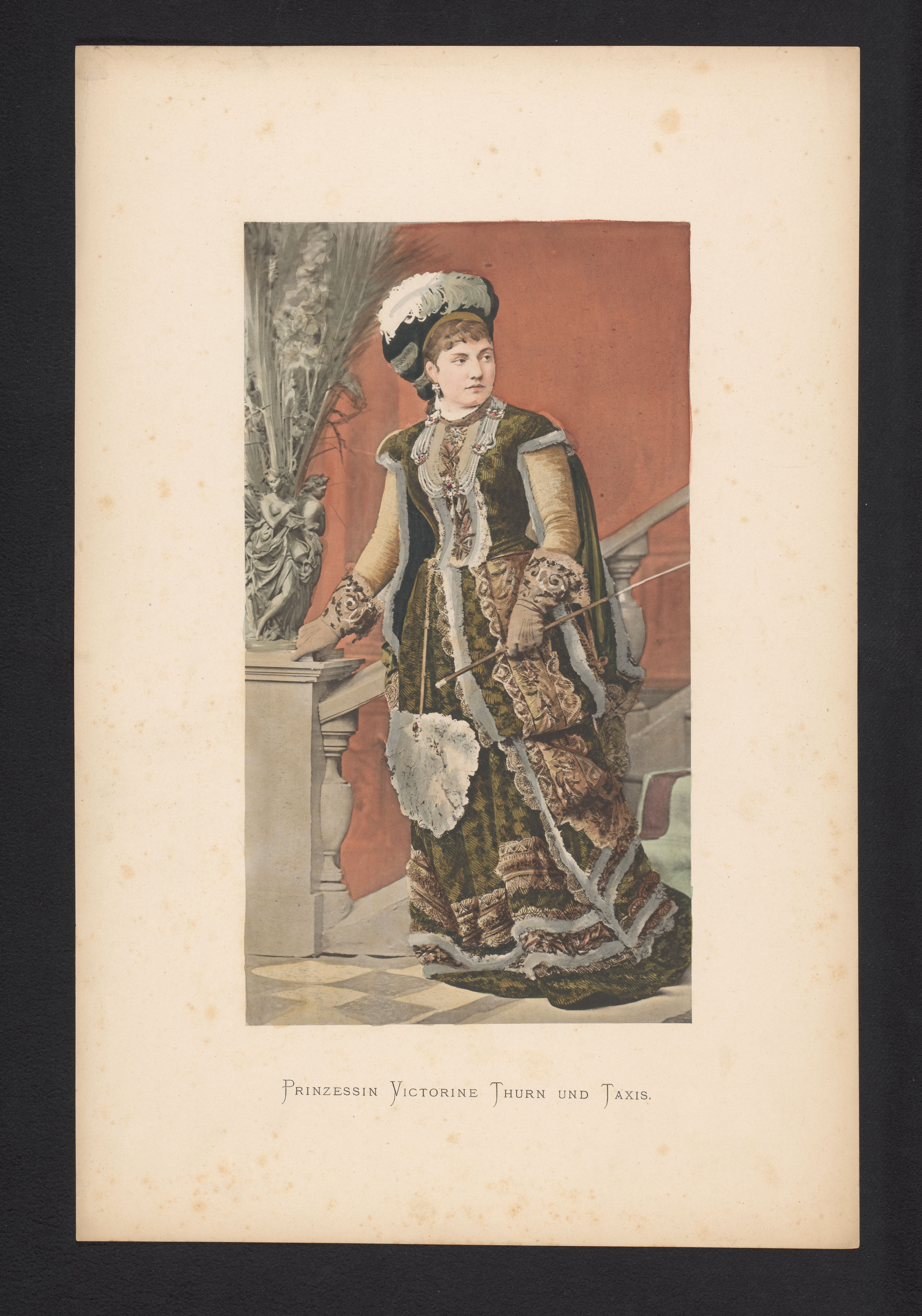
Victor's mother: Princess Viktoria von Thurn und Taxis

Prior to the marriage, Lida was reportedly said to possess $1 million in her own right. Following her marriage to Prince Victor, Lida announced that she and her husband would reside in Europe and she would never again return to the United States.

Prince Victor of Thurn and Taxis was a son of the late Prince and Princess Egon, and a Hungarian citizen by virtue of his father having become naturalized in Hungary at the time of his marriage to a wealthy, already widowed Hungarian noblewoman, Viktoria "Viktorine" Johanna Edelspacher de Gyorok (1841-1895), the owner of Ečka castle. As the last surviving member of her aristocratic lineage, which once owned Săvârșin Castle, his mother Viktoria was invested with an Order of the Starry Cross.

Following the outbreak of World War I, Prince Victor was called to serve as an officer in the Austro-Hungarian Army causing Lida to return to the United States. Shortly before Lida was to sail to Europe to rejoin her husband in the Austrian Republic, Bernard Francis S. Gregory, known as "Count Gregory", filed a lawsuit against her for $50,000 in damages on 8 May 1920 in the New York Supreme Court alleging she had made false statements about him which had caused him to be "shunned by social circles" in New York City. Gregory received the order from Justice Robert Paul Lydon shortly after he learned from Lida's son Gerald Fitzgerald, Dr. Stewart Hastings, and Prince Herman of Saxe-Weimar that she was soon returning to Europe.
