= Inman Sealby =

British-born American merchant captain

- Sealby after the Republic sinking
- Born: October 23, 1862; Maryport, Cumberland, England
- Died: December 4, 1942 (aged 80); Vineland, New Jersey, U.S.
- Education: University of Michigan
- Occupations: Merchant sea captain; maritime lawyer
- Known for: Last captain of RMS Republic
- Family: J. Bruce Ismay (second cousin)

Inman Sealby (October 23, 1862 – December 4, 1942) was a British-born American merchant sea captain who is best known for being the last captain of the RMS Republic which, at the time of its sinking, was the largest vessel to have foundered. Sealby was praised for his conduct during sinking and the subsequent successful rescue of his passengers.

== Early life ==
Sealby was born in Maryport, Cumberland, England on October 23, 1862. Along with his family, he immigrated to the United States when he was ten. The family settled in Vineland, New Jersey, where Sealby worked as a farm hand.

Sealby was a second cousin of J. Bruce Ismay, chair of the White Star Line, through his paternal great-grandfather John Sealby who was Ismay's maternal great-grandfather.

== Maritime career ==
As a teenager, Sealby became an apprentice on the sailing ships of the White Star Line. He spent the next twenty years at sea, eventually rising to the rank of captain.

Sealby's first command was in 1896 aboard the SS Coptic which sailed a San Francisco-China route. He then commanded the SS Persic and SS Suevic of the Jubilee-class, on the Liverpool-Cape Town-Sydney runs; and the SS Corinthic, on the Liverpool-Wellington route.

From there, Sealby moved to the Mediterranean and Liverpool-Boston routes. He was initially captain of the SS Cretic and the SS Canopic; on the latter, his chief officer was Henry Tingle Wilde, later to become chief officer of the RMS Titanic.

Eventually, Sealby was moved to the RMS Republic, seven months before her fatal accident.

=== Sinking of the Republic ===
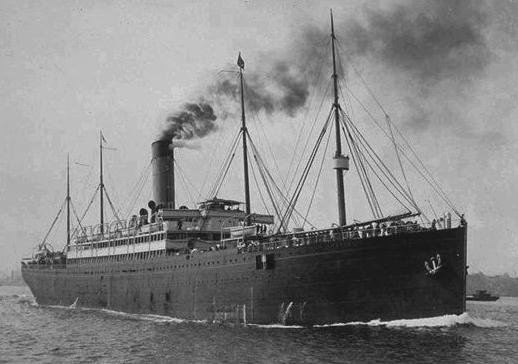
The RMS Republic

In the early morning of 23 January 1909, while sailing from New York City to Gibraltar and Mediterranean ports with 742 passengers and crew, the Republic entered a thick fog off the island of Nantucket, Massachusetts. Taking standard precautions and maintaining her speed, the steamer regularly signaled her presence in the outbound shipping traffic lane by whistle.

At 5:47 a.m., another whistle was heard and Republic's engines were ordered to full reverse, and the helm put "hard-a-port". The Lloyd Italiano liner SS Florida (1905) appeared out of the fog and hit Republic amidships on her portside, at about a right angle. Two passengers asleep in their cabins on Republic were killed when Florida's bow sliced into her, liquor wholesale manager Eugene Lynch's wife Mary and banker William J. Mooney. Eugene Lynch was critically injured and died as a result of his injuries at Long Island College Hospital, Brooklyn, 26 January. On Florida, three crewmen were also killed when the bow was crushed back to a collision bulkhead. Six people died in total.

The engine and boiler rooms on Republic began to flood, and the ship listed. Captain Sealby led the crew in calmly organizing the passengers on deck for evacuation. Initially, Sealby was confident the ship would remain afloat but, with the help of Florida's crew, he began to evacuate his passengers to the more stable Italian liner.

The Republic's wireless operator John R. Binns immediately sent out a CQD distress signal with the ship's relatively newly installed wireless set, using battery power as the main power failed quickly. Amongst the ships which responded was the White Star liner Baltic, commanded by Captain J. B. Ranson, also responded to the CQD call, but due to the persistent fog, Baltic was not able to locate the drifting Republic until that evening. Once on-scene, the rescued passengers were transferred from Florida to Baltic. Because of the damage to Florida, that ship's immigrant passengers were also transferred to Baltic, with Florida following. Once everyone was on board, Baltic sailed for New York.

Only Sealby and a skeleton crew, including the wireless operator Binns, remained behind. The U.S. revenue cutter Gresham was sent by the U.S. coastal services to help tow the ship. By this time, the steamers SS New York and RMS Lucania had also arrived and waited while a futile attempt was made by Gresham to take Republic under tow. On 24 January, Republic sank stern first; at 15,378 gross registered tons, she was the largest ship to have sunk until then.

Sealby, along with Second Officer R. J. Williams, elected to stay with the ship while the rest of the officers and skeleton crew were evacuated. Both men were picked up from the sea after the Republic foundered. In New York, the captain and wireless operator were greeted as heroes.

== Later life ==
Though Sealby was praised for his conduct during the disaster, he was quietly let go by White Star in the aftermath. Despite this, he held his ex-employers highly and defended J. Bruce Ismay in the aftermath of the Titanic disaster three years later: "I have been a servant of the White Star Line since boyhood. For twenty-five years I served under an Ismay, father and son, and during that period I never saw anything which would have led me for one minute to anticipate anything but the best of conduct in Mr. Ismay at all times and under all circumstances."

In 1909, Sealby began studying maritime law at the University of Michigan, which he practiced in San Francisco, until World War I. He then returned to the sea, serving as a transport captain with the United States Merchant Marine. He later served as a member of the United States Shipping Board, until his retirement in 1930.

== Personal life ==
Upon retirement, Inman Sealby returned to Vineland, New Jersey, living there until his death in 1942, aged 80. He was buried in Siloam Cemetery.

Sealby never married. In retirement, he was a member of the Vineland Masonic Lodge and the local branch of the British War Relief Society. He was a keen fisherman and took interest in nature conversation.
