= SS Columbus =

SS Columbus may refer to one of the following passenger steamers:

- SS Columbus (1903), built by Harland and Wolff for the Dominion Line, but was transferred to the White Star Line in October 1903 and renamed RMS Republic, sank in a collision off the coast of Nantucket, Massachusetts in 1909.
- SS Columbus (1914), launched in 1914 for the North German Lloyd but never completed; handed over to the United Kingdom as war reparation; became SS Homeric of the White Star Line; sold for scrapping, 1935
- SS Columbus (1924), launched in 1914 for the North German Lloyd as Hindenburg but never completed; completed in 1924 as Columbus; scuttled in 1939 to avoid capture by the British; passengers and crew rescued by United States cruiser Tuscaloosa
