= Jack Binns (wireless operator) =

Wireless operator on RMS Republic

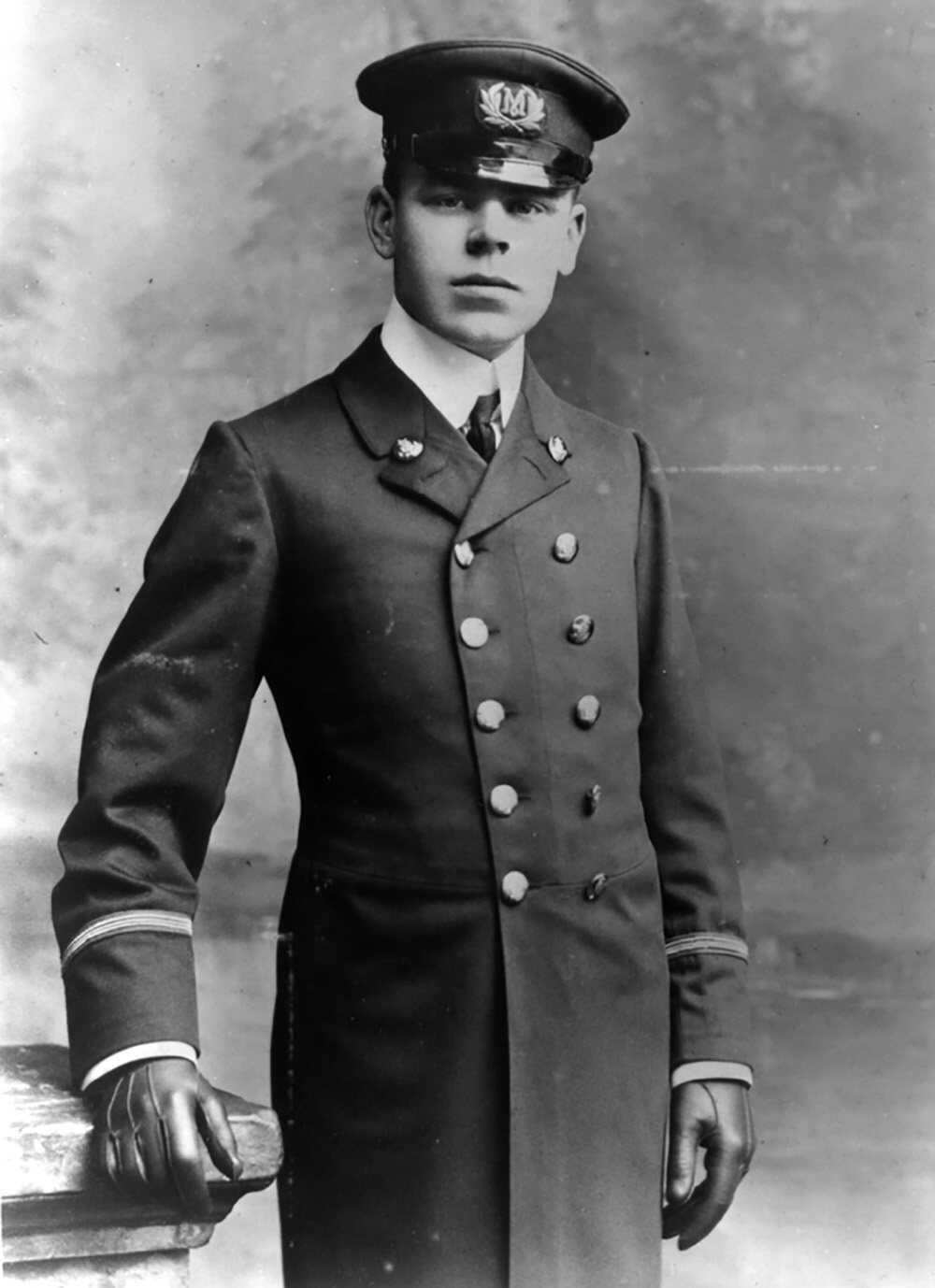
- Binns in his Marconi Co. uniform, c. 1909
- Born: 16 September 1884; Brigg, Lincolnshire, England
- Died: 8 December 1959 (aged 75); New York City, U.S.
- Occupations: Wireless telegraphist; Journalist; Businessman
- Known for: Wireless operator aboard the RMS Republic
- Spouse: Alice Ann Macniff (m. 1914)
- Children: 2

John Robinson Binns (16 September 1884 – 8 December 1959) was a British-American wireless telegraph operator, sailor, and journalist, who best known for being the Marconi wireless officer on the ocean liner RMS Republic during her last voyage. He holds the distinction of being the first person in history to send a CQD distress signal which led to a successful rescue at sea.

== Early life ==
John Robinson Binns was born in a workhouse in Brigg, Lincolnshire, England, on 16 September 1884. Binns' father died two days after his birth and his mother followed a year later. He was brought up by his paternal grandmother. He was educated at Saint Marks Primary School and the National Boys School in Peterborough. His first job was as a messenger for the Great Eastern Railway, during which he was injured and spent six months in hospital. In 1898, at the age of 14, Binns began to study telegraphy. On reaching the age of 18 in 1902, he worked in a post office before joining the British Marconi Company. In 1905 he was appointed wireless officer on the White Star Liner RMS Republic.

== RMS Republic ==
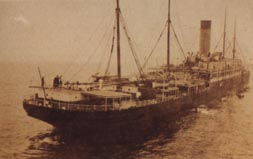
The Republic sinking by her stern.

Binns joined the Republic on 22 January 1909 on a voyage from New York City to Italy with 1,600 passengers and crew, under the command of Captain Inman Sealby. The ship had barely left New York harbour when she was caught in a fog bank off Nantucket, Massachusetts. At 5:47 a.m. on 23 January 1909, the Italian ocean liner SS Florida suddenly emerged from the fog and struck the Republic amidships. The collision killed three crew members on the Florida and two passengers on the Republic, crushing the bow of the Florida and leaving a large gash in the side of the Republic.

In danger of sinking, Binns wasted no time in attempting to send a distress signal via his Marconi wireless set, but it was damaged in the collision. Binns managed to repair the equipment and send out a CQD signal. Although the signal was weak because the ship's power had been cut off by flooding in the engine room, Binns continued his efforts using emergency batteries he had salvaged from the flooded areas of the ship. He reached the Siasconsett wireless station on Nantucket, 60 miles (96 km) away, and continued to send distress signals for the next 36 hours.

Even as the SS Florida picked up most of the Republic's passengers and crew, and the RMS Baltic arrived that evening to take the survivors back to New York, Binns kept up his distress signals. Despite efforts of other ships to tow the stricken liner, Republic sank by the stern on 24 January 1909. Along with the rest of the crew left, with the exception of the captain who was rescued after the ship went under, he was evacuated from the Republic onto another rescue vessel and taken to New York City.

== Later life ==
In the immediate aftermath of the Republic's loss, Binns' efforts to signal for help were recognised as heroic for saving all those on board who had not been lost in the initial collision. Arriving in New York after the sinking, Binns gained much public attention. A ticker-tape parade was held in his honour and he was offered contracts to perform on the vaudeville circuit. Nicknamed "CQD Binns" by the public, he was hailed as a hero in a song and a short film.

Binns reacted negatively to the publicity surrounding his image and successfully sued Vitagraph Studios, the makers of the short film about him, for invasion of privacy. Before returning to Peterborough, England, he testified before United States Congress on the need for mandatory wireless systems on board all ships. Binns continued to work as a wireless operator until April 1912, including aboard the RMS Olympic, when he turned down a new assignment for the maiden voyage of the brand-new White Star Liner, the RMS Titanic. Binns became engaged to an American woman and moved to the United States, where he began a new career in journalism, joining the staff of the New York American as a reporter.

Two days after his new career began, the RMS Titanic sank after striking an iceberg during its maiden voyage. Binns covered the disaster's aftermath for the American and also testified at the U.S. Senate inquiry into the sinking.

Binns remained a journalist until the outbreak of the First World War, when he enlisted in the Canadian branch of Royal Flying Corps as a wireless instructor.

After the war, he became radio and aviation editor of New-York Tribune. He was naturalised in April 1923. The following year, Binns began working for the Hazeltine Corporation, becoming treasurer in 1926 and a director the following year. In 1935, Binns was elected vice-president of the company and in 1942 he became president. Eventually, he became chairman of the company in 1952, and in 1957 the post of honorary chairman was created for him.

== Personal life and death ==
In 1914, Binns married Alice Ann Macniff, with whom he had two daughters, born in 1915 and 1916.

Binns died at the age of 75 on 8 December 1959 at Mount Sinai Hospital in New York City, after suffering from a stroke. His funeral took place on 10 December 1959 at the Frank E. Campbell Funeral Church on Madison Avenue and 81st Street.
