= SS Norseman (1897) =

British cargo liner

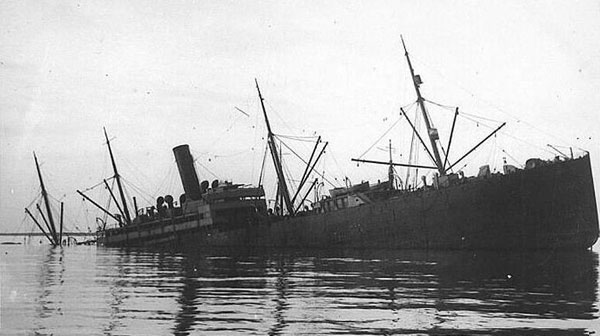
- Norseman beached and partially sunk after being torpedoed by the German submarine U-39 in 1916

History
- Name: Brasilia (1897–1900); Norseman (1900–1916)
- Owner: Hamburg America Line (1897–1900); Dominion Line (1900–1910); Aberdeen Line (1910–1916)
- Port of registry: (United Kingdom of Great Britain and Ireland) Liverpool, United Kingdom
- Builder: Harland & Wolff Ltd.
- Yard number: 318
- Launched: 27 November 1897
- Completed: March 1898
- Maiden voyage: 21 March 1898
- In service: 21 March 1898
- Out of service: 22 January 1916
- Identification: RMJP; Official number: 110633
- Fate: Scrapped in situ in 1920 after being torpedoed on 22 January 1916.

General characteristics
- Type: Cargo liner
- Tonnage: 9,546 GRT
- Length: 152.6 m (500 ft 8 in)
- Beam: 19 m (62 ft 4 in)
- Depth: 10.3 m (33 ft 10 in)
- Installed power: 2 × 4 cyl. Quadruple expansion engines
- Propulsion: 2 × screw propellers
- Sail plan: London – Cape Town – Sydney
- Speed: 13 knots (24 km/h; 15 mph)
- Notes: Four masts (formerly two)

SS Norseman was a British cargo liner that was torpedoed by the German submarine U-39 in the Mediterranean Sea off Thessaloniki, Greece on 22 January 1916. The vessel was en route from Plymouth, United Kingdom to Thessaloniki, while carrying a varied cargo including about 1,100 mules and munitions. Norseman was subsequently beached at Moudros, Greece, and declared a total loss. She was scrapped in situ in 1920.

== Construction ==
Norseman was launched on 27 November 1897 and completed in March 1898 at the Harland & Wolff Ltd. shipyard in Belfast, United Kingdom as Brasilia for the Hamburg America Line. The ship was 152.6 metres (500 ft 8 in) long, had a beam of 19 metres (62 ft 4 in) and had a depth of 10.3 metres (33 ft 10 in). She was assessed at 9,546 gross register tons (GRT) and had two 4-cylinder quadruple expansion engines driving two screw propellers. The ship could generate 604 nominal horsepower, with a speed of 13 knots (24 km/h; 15 mph). She was also fitted with four masts instead of two in 1899.

== Career ==
Brasilia set out on its maiden voyage on 21 March 1898, sailing from Belfast, United Kingdom, to New York City. The ship held accommodation for 300 second class and 2,400 steerage passengers. She continued to serve the Hamburg America Line on the Hamburg, Germany to Baltimore, United States route, making the crossing 13 times between May 1898 and October 1899, after which she was resold to Harland & Wolff. Harland & Wolff added two more masts to the ship's existing two for her conversion into a cargo liner before selling her to the Dominion Line in February 1900. The ship was renamed Norseman and was first used as a troop transport ship, shipping cavalry troops from Liverpool, United Kingdom to Cape Town, South Africa to aid the British army in fighting the Boers during the Second Boer War.

Following its military service, Norseman returned to its usual North Atlantic route, carrying cargo and steerage passengers only after Dominion eliminated the 300 second class accommodations. In 1910 Norseman was chartered to the Aberdeen Line to serve the London, United Kingdom – Cape Town, South-Africa – Sydney route. When the First World War commenced in 1914, Norseman contributed to the British war effort against the Central Powers.

== Sinking ==
Norseman set sail from Plymouth, United Kingdom bound for Thessaloniki, Greece via Marseille, France. The ship's cargo consisted of vehicles, clothing, munitions, barbed wire, about 1,100 mules and oats. She was also transporting 150 men of the 26th Infantry Division. In the early morning of 22 January 1916, Norseman reached the Thermaic Gulf alongside a convoy of six other ships including a destroyer and two warships. Norseman was spotted by the German submarine U-39 at 4:25 am and was first attacked at 5:10 am by a torpedo fired from U-39. However, the torpedo missed the ship and a second attack at 5:36 am also resulted in the torpedo failing to find its target. The attacks were not noticed by any of the ships, so the submarine was able to gain another opportunity in striking the ship.

Norseman was ultimately struck by a torpedo on U-39 her third attempt. The attack left the ship heavily damaged and to save her, she was towed by a torpedo boat, a fishing vessel and two French tugboats to the harbour of Moudros. The towing effort was commanded by Captain Alexander Campbell once his ship, HMS Prince George, arrived to offer their assistance. Captain Campbell ordered Norseman to be abandoned while the ship's stern began to sink before she was beached near Moudros. The stern ultimately sank in 14 metres (45 ft 11 in) of water, drowning many of the mules; however, many others that were stored in the intermediate decks were rescued. No humans lives were lost in the incident.

== Wreck ==
The wreck of Norseman was subjected to many recovery attempts by the British before they abandoned their efforts in 1919. Thereafter the wreck changed hands multiple times, being dismantled and scrapped bit by bit each time until the mid-1950s. She was officially scrapped in situ in 1920, but the large pieces of sheet metal that still lie at the wreck site to this day at a depth of 14 metres (45 ft 11 in), speak of a long and tiresome salvage operation.
