= RMS Republic =

British passenger steamship

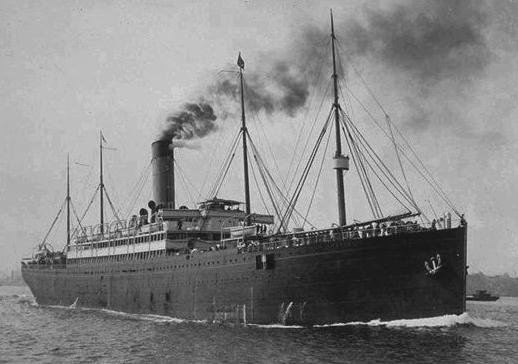
- Republic

History

United Kingdom
- Name: Columbus (1903); Republic (1903–1909)
- Owner: British & North Atlantic Steam Navigation Co. Ltd. (1903); Oceanic Steam Navigation Company (1903–1909)
- Operator: Dominion Line (1903); White Star Line (1903–1909)
- Port of registry: Liverpool
- Builder: Harland and Wolff, Belfast
- Yard number: 345
- Launched: 26 February 1903
- Completed: 12 September 1903
- Home port: Liverpool
- Fate: Sunk after collision with SS Florida on 24 January 1909

General characteristics
- Tonnage: 15,400 gross register tons
- Length: 585.0 ft (178.3 m) overall
- Beam: 67.8 ft (20.7 m)
- Draught: 34 ft 1 in (10.39 m)
- Depth of hold: 24 ft (7.3 m)
- Propulsion: Twin propeller
- Speed: 16 knots (30 km/h)
- Capacity: 2,830 passengers
- Crew: 300

RMS Republic was a steam-powered ocean liner built in 1903 by Harland and Wolff in Belfast, and lost at sea in a collision in 1909 while sailing for the White Star Line. The ship was equipped with a new Marconi wireless telegraphy transmitter, and issued a CQD distress call, resulting in the saving of around 1,500 lives, the first major marine rescue made possible by radio. Known as the "Millionaires' Ship" because of the number of wealthy Americans who travelled by her, she was described as a "palatial liner" and was the flagship of White Star Line's Boston service.

== History ==
=== Background ===
The ship was originally built by Harland & Wolff in Belfast, Ireland, for the Dominion Line for their Liverpool to Boston service and was named Columbus. She was launched on 26 February 1903, and made her maiden voyage in October 1903 from Liverpool to Boston. Shortly after she entered service, the Dominion Line and White Star Line were taken over by the International Mercantile Marine Company (IMMCo) and thus became sister companies. After two voyages with the Dominion Line, Columbus, along with three other Dominion liners: New England, Commonwealth, and Mayflower, were sold to the White Star Line for use on their new service between Liverpool and Boston. Columbus was renamed Republic, the second ship under White Star livery to hold the name (White Star's original Republic of 1872 had been sold to the Holland America Line in 1889 and renamed Maasdam), while her three fellow former Dominion liners were renamed Romanic, Canopic, and Cretic, respectively.

=== Career ===
In January 1904, Republic was switched to White Star's Mediterranean service between Boston, Naples and Genoa in order to tap into the lucrative market for immigrants from Italy to the United States. From then on her route alternated between the Italian service during Autumn and Winter, and the Boston and Liverpool service during the Spring and Summer.

Republic was involved in several minor collisions with other ships; in June 1904 she collided with the steamer Halifax at Boston, which forced the latter ship ashore. Three years later, in February 1907 she was involved with another collision with the Centro America in Naples harbour, causing some damage to both ships.

== Collision with SS Florida and sinking ==
In the early morning of 23 January 1909, while sailing from New York City to Gibraltar and Mediterranean ports with 742 passengers and crew and Captain Inman Sealby in command, Republic entered a thick fog off the island of Nantucket, Massachusetts. Amongst the passengers were some illustrious people, such as James Ross Mellon, his wife Rachel Hughey Larimer Mellon, their daughter Sarah of the Mellon banking family and family maid, Mrs Sophie Mansfield Curtis, wife of George Munson Curtis (treasurer of the International Silver Company), Mrs Mary Harriman Severance, wife of Cordenio A. Severance, Professor John M. Coulter with wife and children, General Brayton Ives, St Louis millionaire Samuel Cupples, historian Alice Morse Earle, and Mildred Montague, Countess Pasolini. Travelling in first class were also Mr Leonard L. McMurray, who, in 1915, would survive the sinking of the Cunard liner Lusitania, and Mrs Bessie Armstead Davis, daughter-in-law of senator Henry G. Davis of West Virginia with two children.

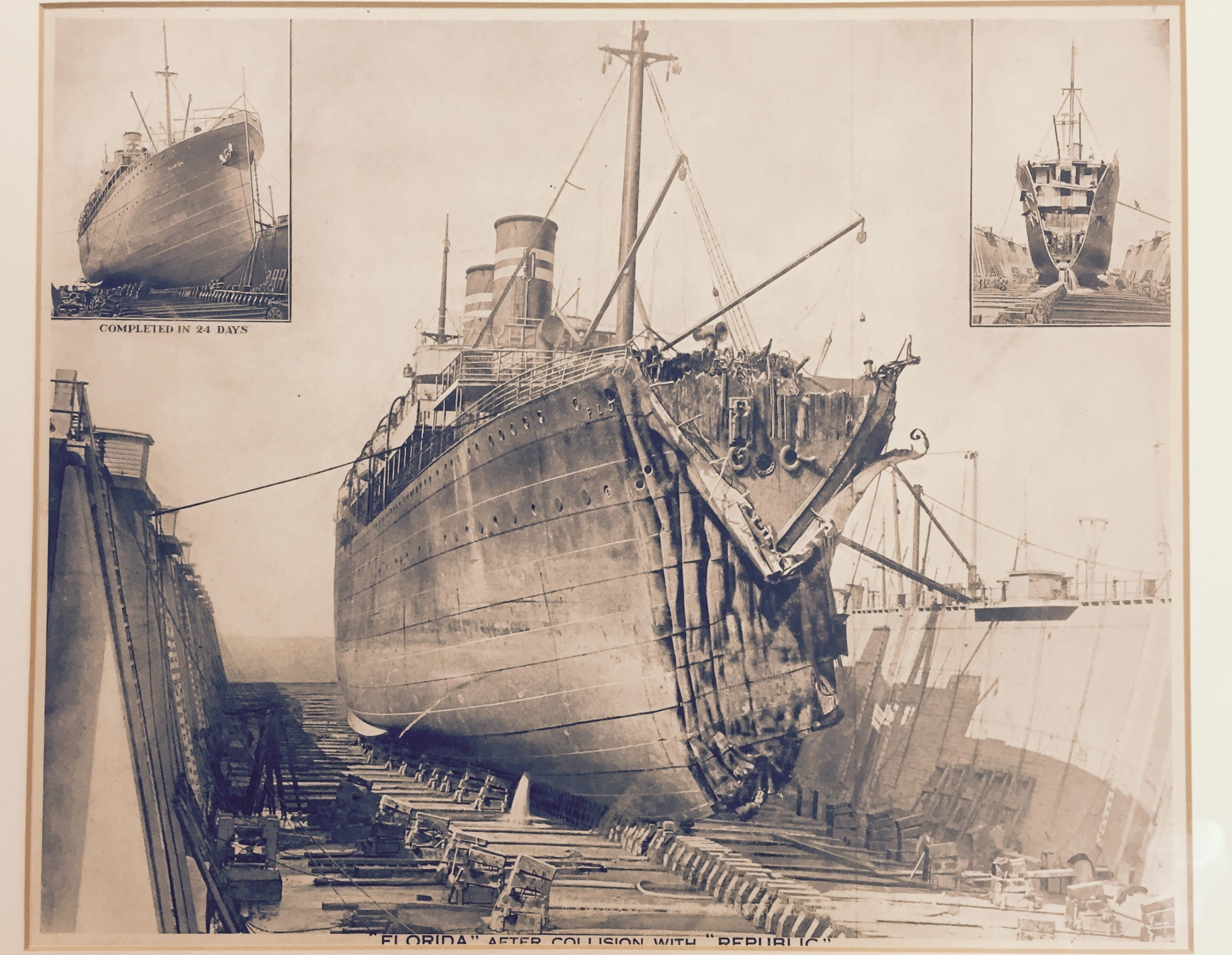
This picture of SS Florida was taken by Martin & Ottaway, a New Jersey marine consulting firm, after Florida collided with Republic. Florida survived the collision and was repaired in 24 days.

Taking standard precautions and maintaining her speed, the steamer regularly signalled her presence in the outbound shipping traffic lane by whistle. At 5:47 a.m., another whistle was heard and Republic's engines were ordered to full reverse, and the helm put "hard-a-port". Out of the fog, the Lloyd Italiano liner SS Florida appeared and hit Republic amidships on her portside, at about a right angle. Two passengers asleep in their cabins on Republic were killed when Florida's bow sliced into her, liquor wholesale manager Eugene Lynch's wife Mary and banker William J. Mooney. Eugene Lynch was critically injured and died as a result of his injuries at Long Island College Hospital, Brooklyn, 26 January. On Florida, three crewmen were also killed when the bow was crushed back to a collision bulkhead. Six people died in total.

The engine and boiler rooms on Republic began to flood, and the ship listed. Captain Sealby led the crew in calmly organizing the passengers on deck for evacuation. Republic was equipped with the new Marconi wireless telegraph system, and a CQD distress signal was sent by John R. Binns. Florida came about to rescue Republic's complement, and the U.S. Revenue Cutter Service cutter Gresham responded to the distress signal as well. Passengers were distributed between the two ships, with Florida taking the bulk of them, but with 900 Italian immigrants already on board, this left the ship dangerously overloaded.

The White Star liner Baltic, commanded by Captain J. B. Ranson, also responded to the CQD call, but due to the persistent fog, Baltic was not able to locate the drifting Republic until that evening. Once on-scene, the rescued passengers were transferred from Gresham and Florida to Baltic. Because of the damage to Florida, that ship's immigrant passengers were also transferred to Baltic. Once everyone was on board, Baltic sailed for New York.

At the time of Republic's sinking, ocean liners were not required to have a full capacity of lifeboats for their passengers, officers, and crew. On the busy North Atlantic route, assistance from at least one ship was believed to be ever-present and that lifeboats would be needed only to ferry all aboard to their rescue vessels and back until everyone was safely evacuated. That scenario, unlike during the RMS Titanic sinking, played out flawlessly during the ship's sinking, and the six people who died were lost in the collision, not the sinking itself.

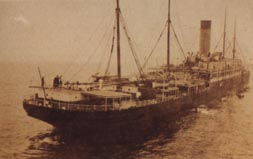
Republic sinking by the stern after the collision

Captain Sealby and a skeleton crew remained on board Republic to make an effort to save her. Crewmen from the Gresham tried using collision mats to stem the flooding, but to no avail. By this time, the steamers New York and Lucania (from Cunard) had also arrived and waited while a futile attempt was made by Gresham to take Republic under tow. On 24 January, Republic sank stern first; at 15,378 tons, she was the largest ship to have sunk until then. All the remaining crew were evacuated before she sank.

=== Reported cargoes ===
Some reports indicate that Republic was carrying gold and other valuables when she sank. One report is that she was carrying gold worth $250,000 in American gold coins to be used as payroll for the US Navy's Great White Fleet. In addition to the US Navy coin-monies shipment, various sources reported on a much larger cargo, $3,000,000 in US gold double eagles ($20). Among these, The Washington Post reported, "Three million dollars in gold coins lie in the rotting hulk of the White Star liner Republic, lost off Nantucket in January, 1909. The Republic, damaged in a collision, was being towed toward New York by the Coast Guard cutter Gresham, when she sank in 240 feet of water. A salvage attempt in 1919 was unsuccessful." And again one year later, "In 1909, the [White] Star Liner Republic was damaged in a collision. While being towed to safety, she sank in over 200 feet of water. At the present, all attempts to salvage the $3,000,000 in her holds have been unsuccessful." The New York Times reported, "The White Star Liner Republic, lost off Nantucket Shoals in 1909, carried $3,000,000 in gold eagles. However, the Republic rests in 185 [270] feet of water."

== Rediscovery ==
The wreck of Republic was found by Captain Martin Bayerle in 1981. It lies upright roughly 50 miles (80 km) south of Nantucket Island at 40°26′0″N 69°46′0″W in a depth of around 270 feet (82 m) of water.

== See also ==
- Sinking of RMS Empress of Ireland, which also sank as a result of a collision
- Treasure hunting (marine)
