= J. B. Ranson =

British merchant captain

Lieutenant Commander J. B. Ranson OBE RNR
- Born: 13 December 1860; Liverpool, Lancashire, England
- Died: 12 August 1935 (aged 74); Southport, Lancashire, England
- Occupation: Merchant sea captain
- Known for: Captain of the RMS Baltic during the rescue of the passengers and crew of RMS Republic
- Awards: British War Medal; Mercantile Marine War Medal
- Military career
- Allegiance: United Kingdom
- Branch: Royal Naval Reserve
- Service years: 1892–1904
- Rank: Lieutenant Commander

Lieutenant Commander Joseph Barlow Ranson OBE RNR (13 December 1860 – 12 August 1935) was a British sea captain and commander of White Star Line liners. He is notable for his role in the rescue of the passengers of the RMS Republic in 1909 using wireless technology, the first marine rescue made possible by radio. In 1912, he was captain of the ship that contacted the ill-fated RMS Titanic to report the sighting of icebergs.

== Biography ==
Ranson was born in Liverpool to Thomas Anthony and Mary Ranson. His marine career began in November 1875, when, one month shy of 15 years old, he became an apprentice to the Pacific Steam Navigation Company. He joined the White Star Line in 1891 and retired in February 1921. He died in 1935 in Southport, Lancashire.

== Rescue of RMS Republic ==
Ranson was the captain of the ship RMS Baltic, which rescued 1700 passengers and crew from the stricken liner RMS Republic (sailing from New York to Gibraltar and Mediterranean ports) when it collided with the Italian liner Florida in fog off the island of Nantucket, Massachusetts on January 23, 1909. Submarine bells, depth sounding, and radio signals were used by Ranson to locate the drifting RMS Republic.

Ranson was awarded the Lloyd’s Life Saving Medal "as an honorary acknowledgement of his extraordinary exertions in contributing to the saving of life on the occasion of the steamships Republic and Florida being in collision in the vicinity of the Nantucket Lightship on the 23 January 1909".

As a joint expression of the gratitude of saloon passengers from the White Star's Baltic and Republic, Ranson received a special commemorative award CQD "Gold" Medal, in recognition of the gallantry of the seamen who had taken part in the rescue.

American wrist-watch millionaire, Ralph Ingersoll, undertook the striking and distribution of the medals, presented to all crew members and captains involved in the incident.

== Sinking of Titanic ==
As captain of RMS Baltic, he was sailing from New York City to Liverpool on 11 April 1912. On 14 April 1912, Baltic warned RMS Titanic by radio that icebergs had been sighted. Titanic hit an iceberg at 11:40 that same night. This warning became notable after the sinking when Edward Smith took the warning from the bridge and handed it to White Star Line managing director J. Bruce Ismay. He took it and reportedly later showed it to some other passengers. Ismay later said he gave the warning back when Captain Smith asked for it later that evening.

At 00:30, the ship Caronia relayed a CQ message from Titanic to the Baltic, and at 00:53 another CQD. At 01:15, Baltic responded "Please tell Titanic we are making towards her". At 01:35, Baltic reported receiving the message "Engine room getting flooded" from Titanic, and responded "We are rushing to you".

Later in the morning, at 08:07 Baltic radioed RMS Carpathia to offer assistance with survivors. Baltic travelled 134 miles west toward the scene of the sinking of Titanic before turning back toward Liverpool. Ranson subsequently provided testimony about the warnings of icebergs and standard operating procedure, to the British inquiry into the Titanic disaster on June 18, 1912. Ranson received 15 shillings in his capacity as master of Baltic.

== Other awards ==
Ranson was appointed an O.B.E. as a Senior Captain in the merchant marines in World War I. He commanded the Baltic from the outbreak of hostilities until October 1915, and thereafter, the Adriatic until the end of the War. He was also awarded the British War and Mercantile Marine Medals.

== Photos ==
Photos of J.B. Ranson with Captain Inman Sealby of the RMS Republic are known to exist (on the RMS Republic official salvage web site, see).

== Known commands ==
- 23 January 1909 Ranson is the commander of Baltic. He rescues the passengers of Republic after a collision with Florida.
- 11 April 1912 Captain Ranson sails Baltic across the Atlantic, warning Titanic of icebergs. He turns the ship around to participate in the rescue effort.
- 12 December 1915 Captain Ranson is recorded as the commander of RMS Britannic, sailing into Liverpool dock to complete commissioning as a hospital ship.
- 18 September 1918 Captain Ranson is listed as J. B. Ranson, O.B.E., Lieut. Commander R.N.R. (ret'd) and the commander of RMS Adriatic on its voyage from Liverpool to New York City.

== Quotes ==
- In a magazine article about the use of radio to locate RMS Republic in fog, he said "the passenger on a well-equipped transatlantic liner is safer than he can be anywhere else in the world".
- Asked about icebergs in the Titanic inquiry he said; "We go full speed whether there is ice reported or not", "I always keep my course whether ice is reported or not, on the track".
