= Martin Bayerle =

American treasure hunter and author (born 1951)

- Born: Martin Gerard Bayerle; April 23, 1951 (age 74); Queens, New York, United States
- Education: Geology, Brooklyn College, 1972
- Criminal charges: Voluntary manslaughter

Martin Gerard Bayerle (born April 23, 1951, Queens, New York) is an American treasure hunter and author, best known for discovering the wreck of the RMS Republic, a White Star Line passenger ship that sank in 1909. He was featured in the History Channel television series Billion Dollar Wreck in 2016.

== Biography ==
=== Early life and education ===
Bayerle was born at St. Albans Naval Hospital in Queens, New York, and grew up in the Brighton Beach neighborhood of Brooklyn, New York. His father, Gerard, was a lawyer and lieutenant colonel in the U.S. Army Reserve. His mother, Ruth, was a German immigrant who came to the United States after World War II. At age 11, Bayerle lost sight in his left eye in an explosives accident. He began scuba diving off the coasts of New Jersey and New York at age 15 and graduated from Abraham Lincoln High School in February 1969. Bayerle attended Brooklyn College from 1969 to 1972, where he majored in geology.

=== Early career ===
As a student and adjunct professor in the Adult Education Department, he taught scuba diving until opening his own dive shop, Brooklyn Divers Supply Corp., in 1972. He led expeditions to local shipwreck sites, such as the Mistletoe, Black Warrior, USS Turner (DD-648), Oregon, and U-853. The shop operated until 1978. Bayerle sued eight SCUBA companies for price fixing conspiracy under the Sherman Act, securing a six-figure settlement after a trial in the U.S. District Court for the Southern District of New York (Brooklyn Diver Supply Corp. v ScubaPro, Petersen Publications, Dacor, NASDS ... and other major components of the sport scuba diving industry).

== Discovery and salvage of the RMS Republic ==
After closing his Brooklyn shop, Bayerle moved to Martha’s Vineyard, Massachusetts, where he obtained a captain’s license and pilot’s license. He established Martha’s Vineyard Scuba Headquarters, Inc. (MAVIS) as a base for locating the wreck of the RMS Republic. When it sank off the U.S. East Coast in January 1909, the Republic was the largest ship to sink at the time, and it was rumored to be carrying a large cargo of gold. After two and a half years of research, Bayerle discovered the wreck in 1981.

Bayerle raised capital from investors, acquired the assets of the bankrupt Canadian offshore oil rig support company Wolf Sub-Ocean Ltd., and purchased a 285-foot Diving Support Vessel, the Oil Endeavor (renamed SOSI Inspector), to support the salvage operation.

In the summer of 1987, Bayerle launched a salvage operation on the Republic in hopes of recovering the rumored gold, attracting international media attention. He was featured on television programs such as CBS Evening News, ABC Evening News (August 5, 1987), and ABC Good Morning America. The 74-day salvage operation was covered by publications including Forbes, The New York Times, The Times (London), and the Los Angeles Times.

The 1987 salvage operation excavated the target area but did not yield any gold. Instead, the crew uncovered the ship’s wine locker, finding hundreds of pre-1900 bottles of wine and champagne. Realizing they were in the wine locker rather than the specie room, Bayerle offered a £25,000 reward for the ship’s construction plans to assist with further excavation. However, no plans were located, and the salvage effort was halted due to lack of funds. The plans for the Republic remain missing.

== Post-salvage life ==
Following the salvage attempt, the 1987 joint venture disbanded, and the artifacts brought up were sold at auction. Bayerle moved to Clarksburg, West Virginia, to live with his in-laws on a small farm. He completed his undergraduate education, earning B.Sc. and B.Sc. B.Adm. magna cum laude degrees from Fairmont State College, and began his M.B.A. education at West Virginia University. He was accepted into the WVU College of Law in the fall of 1990 but did not complete his legal education.

== Killing of Stefano Robotti ==
On April 6, 1991, Bayerle shot and killed Stefano Robotti, the romantic partner of his estranged wife Susan, near Clarksburg, West Virginia. After a six-week trial, a jury found him guilty of voluntary manslaughter. Bayerle was sentenced to one to five years in state prison and served two and a half years.

== Post conviction and release ==
Upon his release, Bayerle continued school in Morgantown, West Virginia, to complete his M.B.A. There, he started an Internet service provider business that he ran for five years and established IDEA, the Internet Development and Exchange Association.

== Recent developments ==
Bayerle subsequently started an archival research company specializing in retrieving records from government archives. His company, MAVIS, has since acquired legal title to the wreck of the RMS Republic and her contents, with the court barring all future claims. After acquiring ownership of Republic on August 1, 2013, Bayerle published research into the history of RMS Republic in a book titled The Tsar's Treasure: The Sunken White Star Liner With a Billion Dollar Secret.
