= SS Southwark (1893) =

American ocean liner

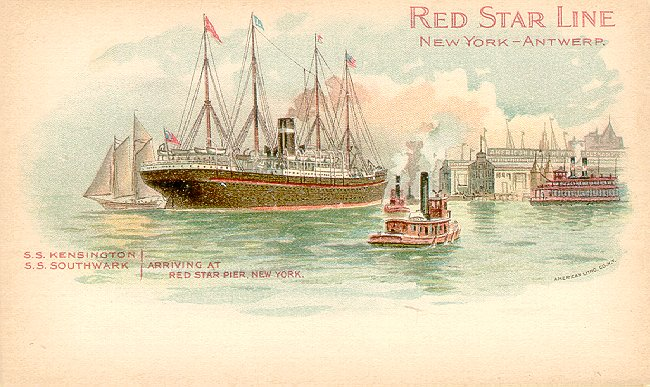
- SS Southwark, arriving at the Red Star Pier, New York

History

United States
- Name: SS Southwark
- Namesake: Southwark
- Owner: American Line (1894-1895); Red Star Line (1895-1903); Dominion Line (1903-1910)
- Operator: International Navigation Co.
- Builder: William Denny and Brothers
- Yard number: 478
- Launched: July 4, 1893
- Maiden voyage: December 28, 1893
- In service: December 28, 1893
- Out of service: 1911
- Identification: UK official number 102121
- Fate: Scrapped in 1911

General characteristics
- Type: Passenger ship
- Tonnage: 8,607 gross register tons
- Length: 146.3 m (480 ft 0 in)
- Beam: 17.4 m (57 ft 1 in)
- Draft: 37.1 ft (11.3 m)
- Depth of hold: 9.7 m (31 ft 10 in)
- Propulsion: triple expansion engine, single screw propellers
- Speed: 11.5 knots

SS Southwark was an American ocean liner that was built by William Denny and Brothers for the American Line.

== Service history ==
She was launched in 1893 and initially sailed on American Line's transatlantic route from Liverpool, via Queenstown, to Philadelphia. In 1895, Southwark was sold to the Red Star Line which employed her on the Antwerp to New York route. In 1903 she was sold to the Dominion Line for the Liverpool to Canada route who chartered her to the Allan Line for two voyages in 1910. She made her final voyage in 1911.

Her sister ship was SS Kensington.
