= SS Scandinavian =

Ocean liner (1898–1922)

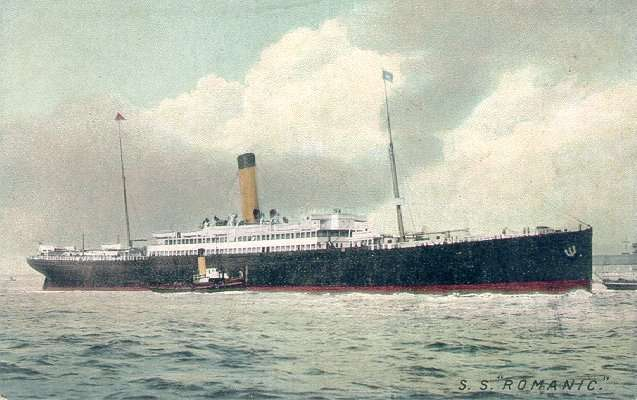
- Postcard of the ship while in service as SS Romanic.

History
- Name: New England (1898–1903); Romanic (1903–1912); Scandinavian (1912–1923)
- Owner: Dominion Line (1898–1903); White Star Line (1903–1912); Allan Line (1912–1917); Canadian Pacific Line (1917–1923)
- Builder: Harland and Wolff, Belfast
- Yard number: 315
- Launched: 7 April 1898
- Maiden voyage: 30 June 1898
- Out of service: 24 May 1922
- Fate: Scrapped at Hamburg in 1923

General characteristics
- Tonnage: 11,394 GRT
- Length: 566 ft (173 m) overall
- Beam: 59.4 ft (18.1 m)
- Installed power: Two Triple-expansion steam engines
- Propulsion: Two propellers
- Speed: 15 knots (28 km/h; 17 mph) service speed
- Capacity: 1,200 passengers

SS Scandinavian was a steamship built at Harland & Wolff in Belfast which entered service as an ocean liner in 1898. The ship changed names and owners several times; she was originally built for the Dominion Line and was known as New England, in 1903 she was transferred to the White Star Line and renamed Romanic. In 1912 she was sold to the Allan Line and renamed Scandinavian, the name which she retained for the rest of her career.

== Background, design and construction ==
In the late 1890s the Dominion Line ordered three ships from Harland & Wolff for their profitable Liverpool-to-Boston service; the first of these was called New England; the others were Commonwealth, and Columbus. The New England was launched on 7 April 1898.

New England had three overall decks, and a capacity of 200 First class, 200 Second class and 800 Third class passengers. She was powered by two four-cylinder triple-expansion steam engines which were coupled to two propellers, and could propel the ship to a maximum speed of 15 knots (28 km/h; 17 mph).

== Career ==
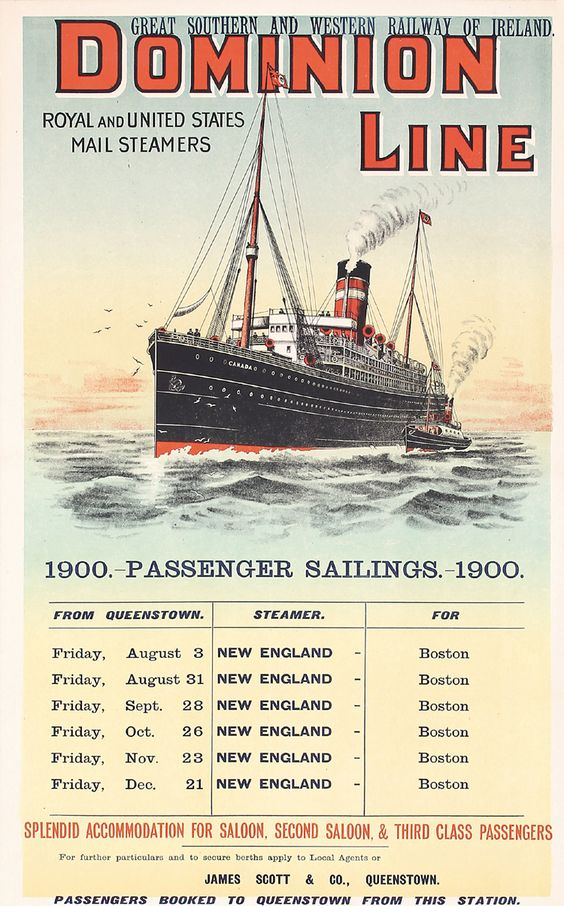
1900 advertisement poster for New England sailings

The New England started her maiden voyage from Liverpool to Boston on 30 June 1898. In 1902 the Dominion Line and the White Star Line were taken over by the International Mercantile Marine Co. (IMMCo) which set about transferring ships between its subsidiary companies in order to increase efficiency. Most of the Dominion Line's profitable routes were soon transferred to the White Star Line including the Boston service. New England made her last sailing from Liverpool under the Dominion Line on 17 September 1903, soon after she was sold internally within the IMMCo group along with her sisters to the White Star Line and renamed Romanic. She was initially retained on the Liverpool–Boston service, and made her first sailing for White Star on 19 November 1903.

Soon afterwards Romanic was transferred to a new service between Boston and Naples and Genoa in Italy in order to take advantage of the lucrative market for immigrants from Italy to the United States. She commenced service on this route on 3 December 1903.

On 12 July 1907 Romanic collided with a 66-ton fishing schooner Natalie B. Nickerson in thick fog near the Nantucket Shoals. The schooner sank and three of her crew of eighteen lost their lives; Romanic picked up the survivors and landed them at Boston.

Romanic continued on the Boston–Italy service until the growth of Italy's own merchant fleet began to displace British vessels on the Mediterranean service. Romanic was withdrawn from the service in November 1911, and in January 1912 she was sold to the Glasgow-based Allan Line and renamed Scandinavian. Her new owners refitted the vessel's passenger accommodation to carry 400 Second and 800 Third class passengers. Her gross register tonnage was increased in the refit to 12,099 tons. She commenced service for the Allan Line on 23 March 1912 between Glasgow, Halifax and Boston for their winter service, switching to the Glasgow–Quebec–Montreal route during the summer months when the St. Lawrence River was ice free.

Following the outbreak of World War I in August 1914 the Scandinavian was used as a troopship to transport Canadian troops to Britain. between 1917 and 1918 she was operated under the Liner Requisition Scheme. In 1917 the Allan Line was taken over by the Canadian Pacific Line. Following her release from government service, Scandinavian made her first voyage for her new owners on 22 August 1918 between Liverpool and New York. Three months later she was switched to the Liverpool–Saint John service.

In May 1920 she was switched again to the Antwerp–Southampton–Quebec–Montreal route, but by 1922 there were a surplus of ships on this route, and Scandinavian was withdrawn from the service in July that year and laid up at Falmouth for disposal. The following year she was sold for scrap, and in October 1923 she moved to Hamburg for breaking up.
