= SS Kensington (1893) =

American passenger ship

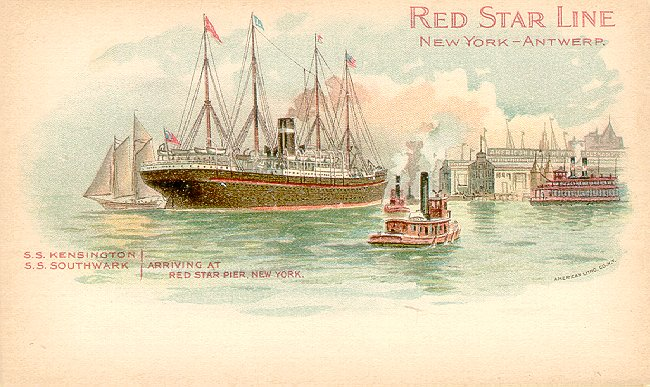
- SS Kensington, arriving at the Red Star Pier, New York, 1895

History

United States
- Name: SS Kensington
- Namesake: Kensington
- Owner: American Line (1894-1895); Red Star Line (1895-1903); Dominion Line (1903-1910)
- Operator: International Navigation Co.
- Builder: J&G Thomson
- Launched: 26 October 1893
- In service: 1894
- Out of service: 1910
- Fate: Scrapped in Italy 1910

General characteristics
- Type: Passenger ship
- Tonnage: 8,669 gross register tons
- Length: 146.3 m (480 ft 0 in)
- Beam: 17.4 m (57 ft 1 in)
- Depth of hold: 9.7 m (31 ft 10 in)
- Propulsion: triple expansion engine, single screw propellers
- Speed: 11.5 knots

SS Kensington was an American passenger ship built for the American Line.

== History ==
The ship was ordered in 1893 and laid down in the J&G Thompson Shipyard of Glasgow, Scotland. She was launched in October 26, 1893 and entered service a year later for the American Line's transatlantic route. In August 1895 the Kensington was sold to the Red Star Line (one of the companies owned by International Navigation Company, which was run by the American Line). After making her final voyage for Red Star line, she was sold to the Dominion Line and was put into service for the Liverpool to Canada route. She made her final voyage in 1908 and was scrapped in 1910.

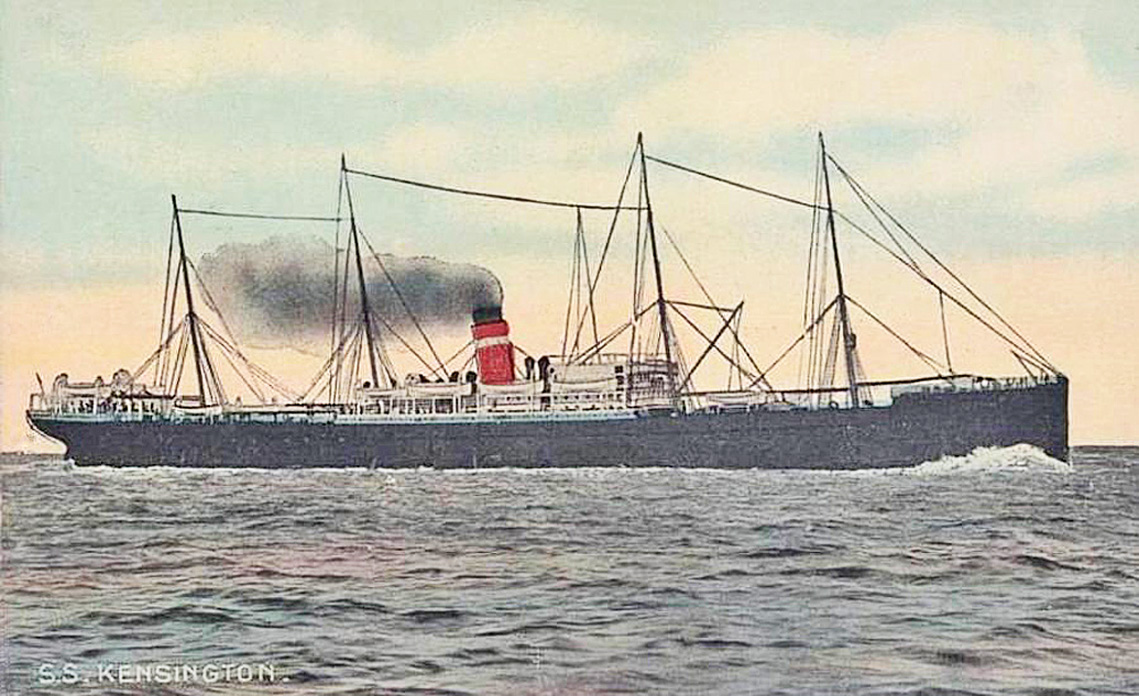
SS 'Kensington' in service for the Dominion Line (1903-1908)

Her sister ship was the SS Southwark (1893).
