= SS Canada =

UK ocean liner

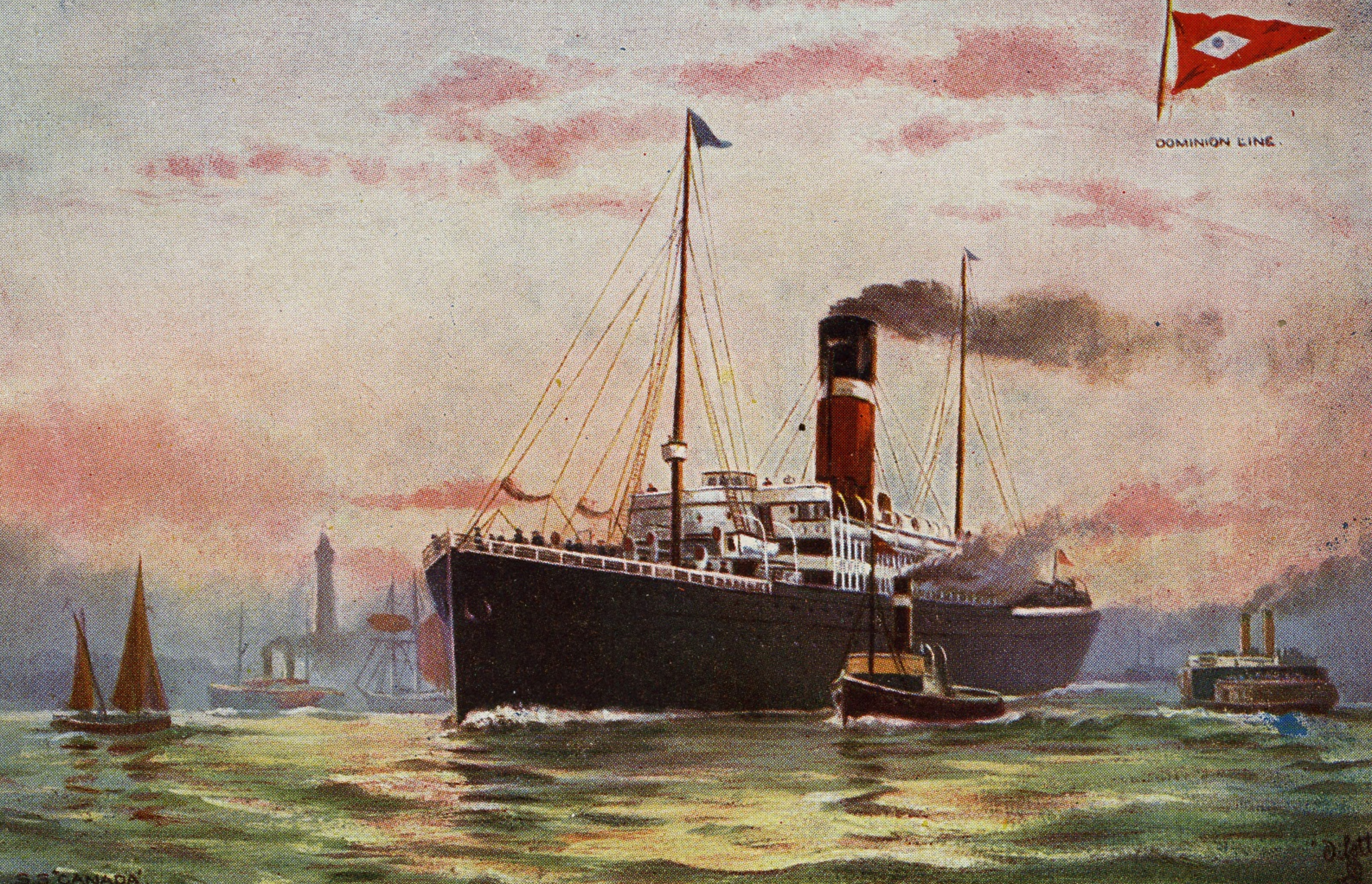
- Postcard of Canada

History

United Kingdom
- Name: Canada
- Namesake: Canada
- Builder: Harland and Wolff, Belfast
- Yard number: 300
- Launched: 14 May 1896
- Completed: 26 December 1896
- Identification: UK official number 106806; code letters PLMN; by 1913: call sign MCF
- Fate: Scrapped in Genoa, 1926

General characteristics
- Type: Ocean liner
- Tonnage: 8,806 GRT, 5,701 NRT
- Displacement: 9,413 long tons (9,564 t)
- Length: 514 ft (157 m) overall; 500.4 ft (152.5 m) registered
- Beam: 58.2 ft (17.7 m)
- Depth: 31.1 ft (9.5 m)
- Installed power: 2 × triple-expansion engines; 873 NHP
- Propulsion: 2 × screws
- Speed: 15 knots (28 km/h)
- Capacity: Passengers: 1896: 200 × 1st class; 200 × 2nd class; 800 × 3rd class; 1919: 463 × cabin class; 755 × 3rd class

SS Canada was a British Dominion Line ocean liner. She was the first twin-screw steamship operating between Liverpool and Montreal. She was launched on 14 May 1896; completed on 26 September; and made her sea trials on 27 September. She began her maiden voyage on 1 October 1896 from Liverpool, via Quebec, to Montreal. She was a troopship in the Second Boer War from November 1899 to Autumn 1902.

In the First World War, Canada was a troopship from 1914 until 1918. Her first voyage after the war was in November 1918, from Liverpool to Portland, Maine. She was refitted with berths for 463 cabin class and 755 third class passengers.In 1921 she was transferred to the Leyland Line of Liverpool. On 29 September 1926, Canada arrived in Genoa, Italy, where she was scrapped by L. Pittaluga.

== Bibliography ==
- Emmons, Frederick (1972). The Atlantic Liners 1925–1970. New York: Bonanza Books. ISBN 978-0517209837.
- Haws, Duncan (1979). The Ships of the Cunard, American, Red Star, Inman, Leyland, Dominion, Atlantic Transport and White Star lines. Merchant Fleets in Profile. Vol. 2. Cambridge: Patrick Stephens Ltd. ISBN 0-85059-324-7.
- Lloyd's Register of British and Foreign Shipping. Vol. I.–Steamers. London: Lloyd's Register of Shipping. 1898 – via Internet Archive.
- The Marconi Press Agency Ltd (1913). The Year Book of Wireless Telegraphy and Telephony. London: The St Katherine Press.
