= RMS Baltic =

Ocean liner that operated by white star line from 1904 and 1932

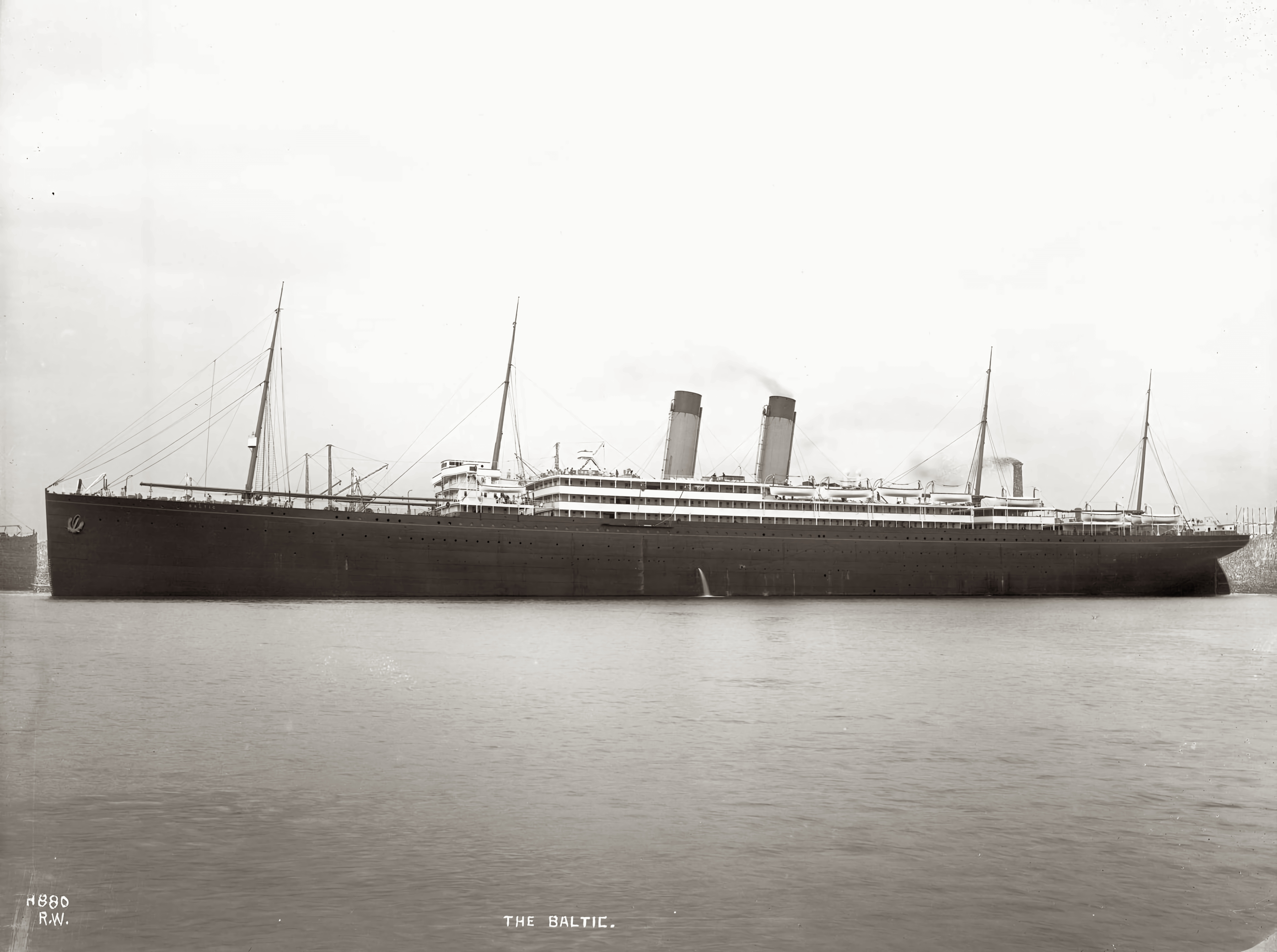
- RMS Baltic in a June 1904 photograph by Robert Welch

History

United Kingdom
- Namesake: Baltic Sea
- Owner: White Star Line
- Operator: White Star Line
- Port of registry: Liverpool
- Route: Liverpool to New York City
- Builder: Harland and Wolff, Belfast, UK
- Yard number: 358
- Laid down: 7 June 1902
- Launched: 21 November 1903
- Completed: 23 June 1904
- Maiden voyage: 29 June 1904
- In service: 1904–1932
- Out of service: 17 September 1932
- Fate: Scrapped in Osaka, Japan in 1933

General characteristics
- Class & type: Big-Four class
- Tonnage: 23,876 GRT, 15,295 NRT
- Length: 222.2 m (729 ft 0 in)
- Beam: 23.0 m (75 ft 6 in)
- Installed power: 14,000–16,000 hp (10,000–12,000 kW)
- Propulsion: Two four-cylinder Quadruple expansion engines powering two propellers
- Speed: 18 knots (33 km/h; 21 mph) max
- Capacity: As built: 2,875 passengers (425 first, 450 second, 2,000 third)

RMS Baltic was an ocean liner of the White Star Line that sailed between 1904 and 1932. At 23,876 gross register tonnage, she was the world's largest ship until May 1906. She was the third of a quartet of ships, all measuring over 20,000 gross register tons, dubbed The Big Four, the other three being RMS Celtic, RMS Cedric, and RMS Adriatic.

During her civilian career, Baltic served between Liverpool and New York. She was involved in a few minor incidents during her career. She distinguished herself especially in 1909 when she came to the aid of the Republic and the SS Florida that had collided with each other. The Baltic's rescue of all passengers drew attention to the important role that the new wireless telegraphy technology could play in ensuring safety at sea. In April 1912, the Baltic also picked up distress signals from the Titanic, but was too far away to intervene during the latter's sinking.

During World War I, the Baltic carried troops from 1915 to 1918. She survived a torpedoing attempt and transported the first American troops to Europe, with General John J. Pershing on board. After the war, the ship continued its commercial service during the 1920s. Having become too old, she was finally retired in 1932 and scrapped the following year, ending a career of 28 years' service

== Conception and construction ==
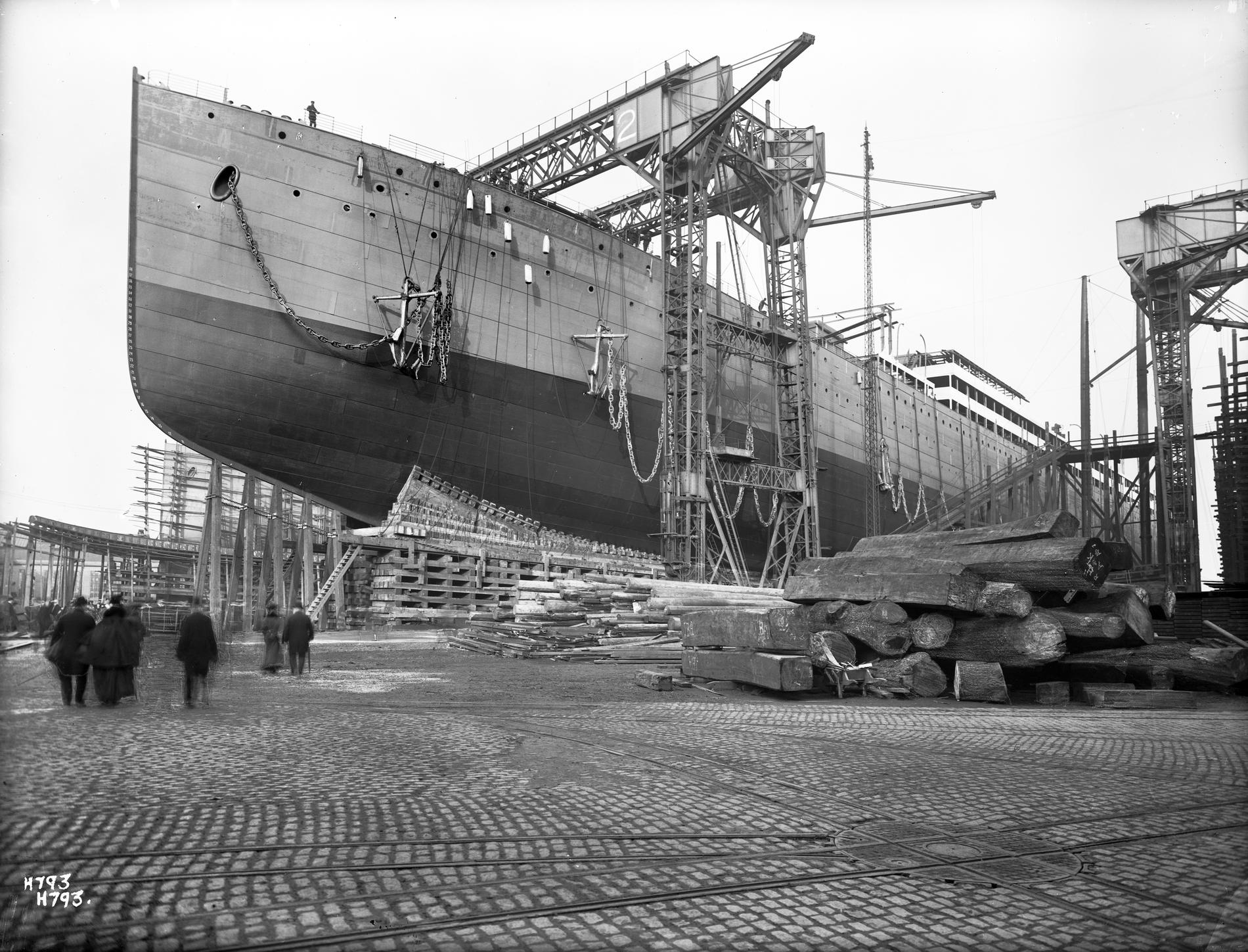
Baltic under construction, c. November 1903

In the late 1890s and shortly before his death, Thomas Henry Ismay, chairman of the White Star Line, initiated a policy shift away from the race for speed to focus on slower but larger ships, compensating for the loss of speed through great savings, increased comfort, and better passenger capacity. This initiative gave rise, in 1901, to the ordering of the series of liners dubbed the "Big Four": the Celtic, followed two years later by the Cedric. When the latter was launched, a third ship was just under construction at the Harland and Wolff shipyards in Belfast: the Baltic (the quartet to be completed in 1907 by the Adriatic). She was the second ship to bear this name (in reference to the Baltic Sea) in the company's fleet; the first having been one of its very first liners, in the 1870s.

The Baltic was originally supposed to be the same size as her two predecessors, but rather quickly, the company decided that this ship, built under hull number 352, was to be the largest ever built, requiring enlargement of the ship. This task was not easy as the hull was already built; the ship was nevertheless cut in two and the rear part set back nearly six metres to make room for an addition. This ultimately increased her tonnage by nearly 3,000 tons, giving more space to passengers.

The liner was launched on 21 November 1903. Completed the following spring, the liner reached Liverpool on 23 June 1904 to be delivered to its owner.

== Characteristics ==
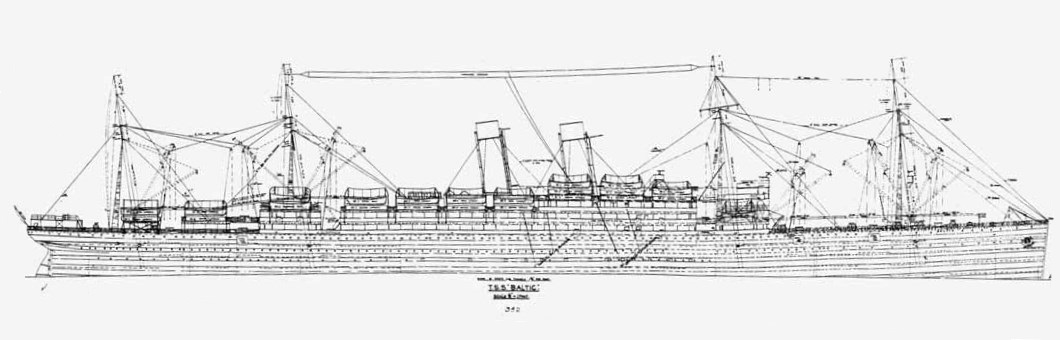
Line drawing plan for Baltic, 1903

An enlarged version of the Celtic and the Cedric, the Baltic was, when she entered service, the largest liner in the world, with a gross tonnage of 23,876 and a net tonnage of 15,295, 222.2 metres (729 ft 0 in) in length overall by 23 m (75 ft 6 in) in width and 16 m (52 ft 6 in) in draft. Her hull was black and she had a white superstructure. Her funnels were ocher-brown topped with a black cuff, the colors of the White Star Line. She also had four masts, the first carrying the lookout's nest, the following serving as support for the cables of the wireless telegraphy. The ship had four continuous decks as well as an upper deck and several superstructures.

Propelled by two propellers powered by two four-cylinder triple expansion steam engines, the ship could sail at an average speed of 16 knots (30 km/h; 18 mph), and could reach a maximum speed of 18 knots (33 km/h; 21 mph). Her machinery initially developed a power of 14,000 horsepower (10,000 kW), which rose to 16,000 hp (12,000 kW) after an improvement was made to the machinery to allow the vessel to maintain the same speeds as her predecessors despite her larger size. Her coal consumption was also slightly higher than that of the Celtic and the Cedric, at 280 tons per day instead of 260. She was supplied with electricity and was provided with electric lights and refrigeration installations.

The Baltic had sumptuous facilities, such as a dining room topped with a glass roof, and a smoking room decorated with stained glass. She also contained a lounge, as well as a reading and writing lounge, a veranda café, and a promenade deck. Second-class facilities were also more spacious than those in other ships of the time. She could carry 425 first-class, 450 second-class, and 2,000 third-class passengers, which also marked a change, with the upper classes having a greater capacity than on the Celtic and the Cedric while the third-class is reduced in capacity.

In 1921, the Baltic was refit, and her third-class capacity reduced to 1,166 people. In 1927, she was reorganized to carry 393 cabin class passengers, 339 tourist class and 1,150 third-class passengers. The ship also accommodated a crew of 560.

== Early career ==
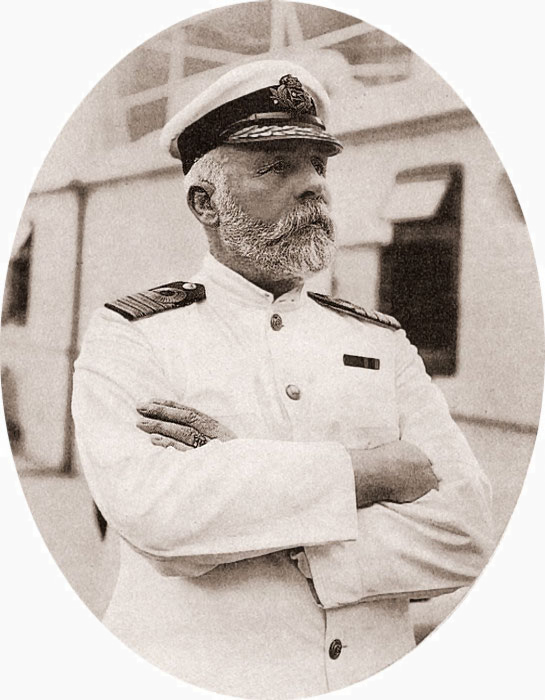
Edward Smith was the first captain of the Baltic.

The Baltic made her maiden voyage on 29 June 1904 from Liverpool to New York under the command of Edward Smith, the future captain of the Titanic. She arrived in New York on 8 July, with 906 passengers onboard (209 first class, 142 second class and 555 third class). She made the crossing in 7 days, 13 hours and 37 minutes at an average speed of 16.1 knots, burning just 235 tons of coal per day on average. She was at the time, the largest liner yet built. However, the modifications made to her structure during her design posed a problem: the machinery was not upgraded accordingly, and due to her increased tonnage the ship struggled to maintain the service speed required to ensure regular rotations.

The Baltic remained on the route from Liverpool to New York for the following years, and proved to be more popular with customers than her fellow liners, probably thanks to her more spacious facilities. Her early years, however, were peppered with incidents. In May 1905, she was held back for six hours by a breakdown of machinery. More serious, on 3 November 1906, a fire broke out in one of her holds. It was put under control, but water and fire destroyed more than 600 bales of cotton. On April 13, 1907, she collided with and sank a barge loaded with coal in the middle of New York Harbor, and in August 1908, a fire broke out in her holds during a stopover in New York, causing $10,000 in damage. On 30 June 1910, she collided with the tanker Standard of the German-American Petroleum Company: The collision tore the hull of the Baltic above and below the waterline, and one compartment was flooded, while a severely injured sailor from the tanker was transferred aboard the liner by boat to be operated on there.

From 1907 onwards, the Baltic provided, along with the Celtic, the Cedric, and the Arabic, a secondary service from Liverpool on Thursdays, in addition to the main service from Southampton.

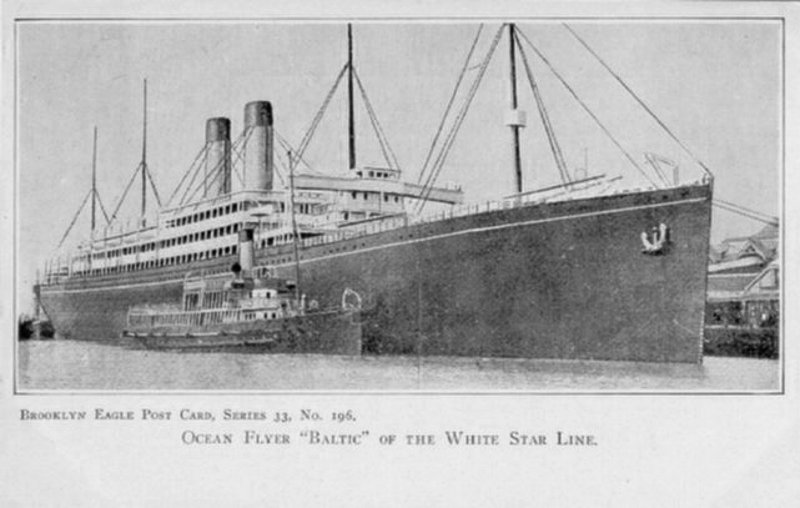
Ca. 1910s postcard of Baltic

On 23 January 1909, the White Star liner RMS Republic steaming in a fog was rammed by the Italian ship SS Florida off the northeastern coast of the United States and was severely damaged by the collision. Her radio operator, Jack Binns, hastened to telegraph a CQD, a distress signal in use at the time for the stations of the Marconi company. Despite the collision having damaged the wireless set on Republic, Binns made repairs and, using battery power, managed to reach the Siasconsett wireless station on Nantucket. The signal was also picked up by the Baltic's radio operator around six in the morning. The liner, commanded by J. B. Ranson, which was traveling westbound 64 miles from the collision site, turned around to rescue the passengers. In the meantime, the Republic's passengers were evacuated onto the less damaged Florida, and only part of the crew, including Captain Inman Sealby, remained on board, still hoping to be able to have the liner towed by another ship in order to beach her to prevent her from sinking.

Due to the thick fog that enveloped the area, the Baltic was forced to seek the Republic by methodically steaming around the area. Captain J.B. Ranson estimated that she travelled 200 miles zigzagging through the region. By dint of the use of rockets and bombs, the two ships met each other around 7 PM. The Florida was in turn in a bad position, and the passengers were transferred again, this time to the Baltic, without any losses despite the complexity of the operation in the middle of the night and in the fog. The Republic finally sank around 8 PM the next day, with her captain remaining on board with an officer before being picked up by another one of the ships that had arrived in the vicinity. There were only five victims, killed in the collision. This was the first time that wireless telegraphy has played a leading role in saving lives at sea. During the return voyage, wireless telegraphy continued to play an important role in enabling the transmission of news. The Baltic and the survivors were greeted by a large crowd on their arrival in New York, to which the Florida also returned on its own. The passengers of the Baltic for their part decided to contribute to offering commemorative medals to the three captains, as well as to the radio operator Jack Binns.

On 14 April 1912, Baltic sent an ice warning message to the ill-fated RMS Titanic:

"Greek steamer Athenia reports passing icebergs and large quantities of field ice today in latitude 41° 51' N, longitude 49° 52' W. Wish you and Titanic all success. Commander."

This was not enough for the Titanic to avoid a collision and she sank the next morning. The Baltic then received the SOS from the Titanic via the Caronia and diverted for nine hours to try to come to her rescue. The Baltic was, however, too far away to be of any help. After the Titanic disaster, the liner was, like all the other ships of the company, provided with additional lifeboats to take into account the lessons of the sinking.

== Participation in World War I ==
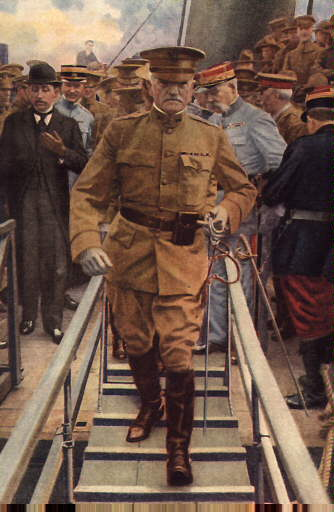
General John J. Pershing and the first American troops arrived in France aboard the Baltic during World War I.

When World War I broke out in 1914, the Baltic continued to provide her passenger service, as did the Adriatic which joined the other members of the Big Four on the Liverpool route. Joined by the Lapland, the Zeeland, and the Vaderland of the Red Star Line (the latter two being quickly renamed Northland and Southland respectively), they provided the only transatlantic service of the company, between Liverpool and New York while many other ships were requisitioned for the war effort, starting with the Celtic and the Cedric, converted to auxiliary cruisers. During this service, the Baltic collided with the steamship Comal at the exit of the Ambrose Channel on 19 November 1914.

From 1915, the Baltic was, in turn, requisitioned to serve as a troop transport under the Liner Requisition Scheme. On 26 April 1917, she was attacked by the German submarine U-66 which tried unsuccessfully to torpedo her, and the U-boat engaged in a two-day pursuit, from which the Baltic emerged unscathed. Baltic was the ship used to deliver Major General John J. Pershing and his staff to England. On 9 June 1917, the War Department released its first communique revealing the General's arrival in England:

"Baltic Carried Pershing Over. Londoners Preparing to Entertain American Soldiers. 10 U.S. Airmen in France. Pershing's Personal Staff and Other Members of General Staff Number 67 Officers and Are Accompanied by a Squad of 50 Privates and a Large Civilian Clerical Force- Pershing Anxious to Get into Harness. London, June 9.- Headed by Major General John J. Pershing, its commander, the first representation of the American army that is to enter the European war disembarked at a British port after an uneventful voyage of 10 days onboard the White Star liner Baltic. The party was received with full military honours and immediately entrained for London, where it arrived and was welcomed by the Earl of Derby, the minister of war; Viscount French commander of the British forces, and the American officials..."

In reference to this event, a commemorative plaque was then installed in the main hall of the liner.

During the war, she also carried large quantities of oil in her bunkers and double bottom. During the first ten months of 1918, she brought 32,000 Canadian soldiers to France. Finally, the ship ceased its military service on 12 December of that same year to resume its civilian service.

== Post-war years ==
Back on the route from Liverpool to New York at the end of 1918, the Baltic underwent a refit in 1921. With the number of migrants crossing the Atlantic being fewer than that before the war, the capacity of the third class of the liner fell from 1,800 to 1,166 passengers. From 1922, the Adriatic returned to the route, uniting the Big Four on the slow secondary service of the White Star Line. Every two weeks, the liners made an additional stopover in Boston. Then-three-year-old Isaac Asimov and his family migrated to the United States via Liverpool on the Baltic, arriving on February 3, 1923. In 1924, the boilers aboard the Baltic were replaced by more recent models.

In 1927, the ship was modernized and converted to a “cabin class” ship, offering more modest rates; her sister ships underwent the same refit the following year. In the case of the Celtic, the service was short-lived as she ran aground off Cobh at the end of 1928. On 6 December 1929, the Baltic came to the rescue of the sinking schooner Northern Light. The following month, she experienced an incident when a wave knocked her against a dock in Liverpool, damaging one of her propellers; it took divers nine hours to repair the damage. The Baltic became a regular at the newly created Canadian immigration terminal Pier 21 when it opened in 1928. Baltic made 18 voyages to Pier 21.

In the early 1930s, however, the White Star Line experienced a period of internal crisis reinforced by the Great Depression. In 1930, a new ship joined the company's fleet, the Britannic, which became very successful. The older ships were less useful, and the Cedric was scrapped at the end of 1931. The arrival in 1932 of the Georgic sealed the fate of the Baltic, which made her last crossing on 17 September of that same year. Sold to Japanese shipbreakers in early 1933 along with the Megantic for £33,000, the liner left Liverpool for Osaka on 17 February 1933, under the command of Captain Corfe, to be scrapped there.
