= SS Canopic =

Passenger liner of the White Star Line

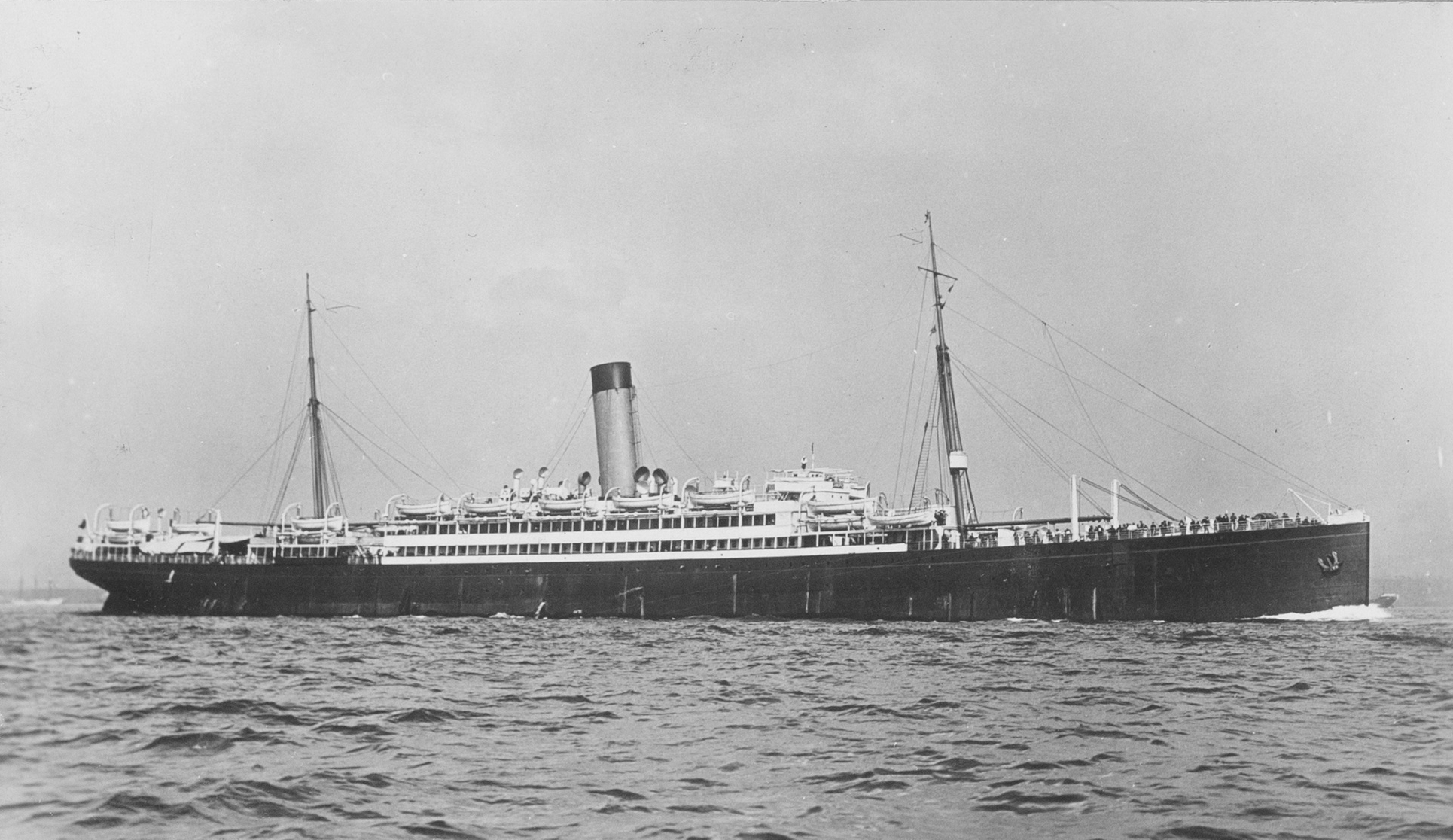
- SS Canopic

History

United Kingdom
- Name: SS Commonwealth (1900-1903); SS Canopic (1903-1925)
- Operator: Dominion Line (1900-1903); White Star Line (1903-1925)
- Builder: Harland & Wolff, Belfast
- Launched: 31 May 1900
- Fate: Scrapped, 1925

General characteristics
- Type: Passenger liner
- Tonnage: 12,268 GRT; 7,717 NRT
- Length: 596 ft (182 m) overall
- Beam: 59 ft 3 in (18.06 m)
- Depth: 35 ft 10 in (10.92 m)
- Propulsion: Harland & Wolff 988 nhp 6-cylinder triple expansion steam engine; 2 screws
- Speed: 16 knots (30 km/h; 18 mph)
- Capacity: 1,300 passengers: 250 × 1st class; 250 × 2nd class; 800 × 3rd class

SS Canopic was a passenger liner of the White Star Line.

The ship was built by Harland & Wolff in Belfast for the Dominion Line, and launched on 31 May 1900 as the Commonwealth. The 12,268 GRT ship was 578 feet (176 m) long, and powered by a 988 nhp 6-cylinder triple expansion steam engine which gave her a service speed of 16 knots (30 km/h; 18 mph). She could carry up to 1,300 passengers.

The ship initially operated between Liverpool and Boston, but in 1903 she was transferred to the White Star Line and renamed Canopic. Her first crossing for the White Star Line began on 14 January 1904, on which she sailed from Liverpool to Boston. Immediately after this first crossing, she joined the Romanic and Republic on the White Star Line's new Mediterranean service, on which she would remain for more than 13 years. She was requisitioned for war service between 1917 and 1919, then served on the Liverpool–Montreal route and the Philadelphia-Liverpool route until 1925. She was eventually scrapped at Briton Ferry, Wales in 1925. Timber panelling from the dining hall was salvaged and installed in the former Canopic Restaurant at Mumbles from where it was later reinstalled in the town's White Rose hotel.
