= Dominion Line =

British transport company

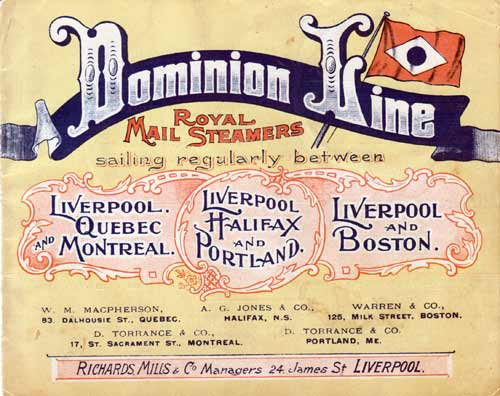
- Advert from the 1890s
- Industry: Shipping and transportation
- Founded: 1870; 156 years ago (as the Liverpool & Mississippi Steamship Company)
- Defunct: 1926
- Successor: White Star Canadian Service
- Headquarters: Liverpool, England
- Area served: Transatlantic, East Coast of Canada and the U.S.

The Mississippi & Dominion Steamship Co Ltd, better known as the Dominion Line, was a transatlantic passenger line founded in 1870 as the Liverpool & Mississippi Steamship Company, which was renamed in 1872.

The company concentrated on the UK-Canada passenger trade. The line sailed from Liverpool to several ports on the American and Canadian east coasts, namely Montreal, Quebec City, Halifax, Portland, and Boston. Early in the company's life, it also served New Orleans.

The firm was amalgamated in 1902 into the International Mercantile Marine Company. After 1908, the passenger service was operated under the name "White Star-Dominion Line" and in 1926 the Dominion Line company was wound up completely, with the service itself being renamed "White Star Line Canadian Service".

== Ships of the line ==
- SS Canada
- SS Commonwealth
- SS Mayflower
- SS Manxman
- SS Haverford
- SS Kensington
- SS Cornishman
- SS Norseman
- SS Columbus
- SS New England
- SS Southwark
- SS Welshman
- SS Irishman
- SS Dominion
- SS Ottawa
- SS Southland
- SS Oregon
- SS Merion
- SS Scotsman
- SS Turcoman
