= SS Cretic =

Ocean liner (1902–1929)

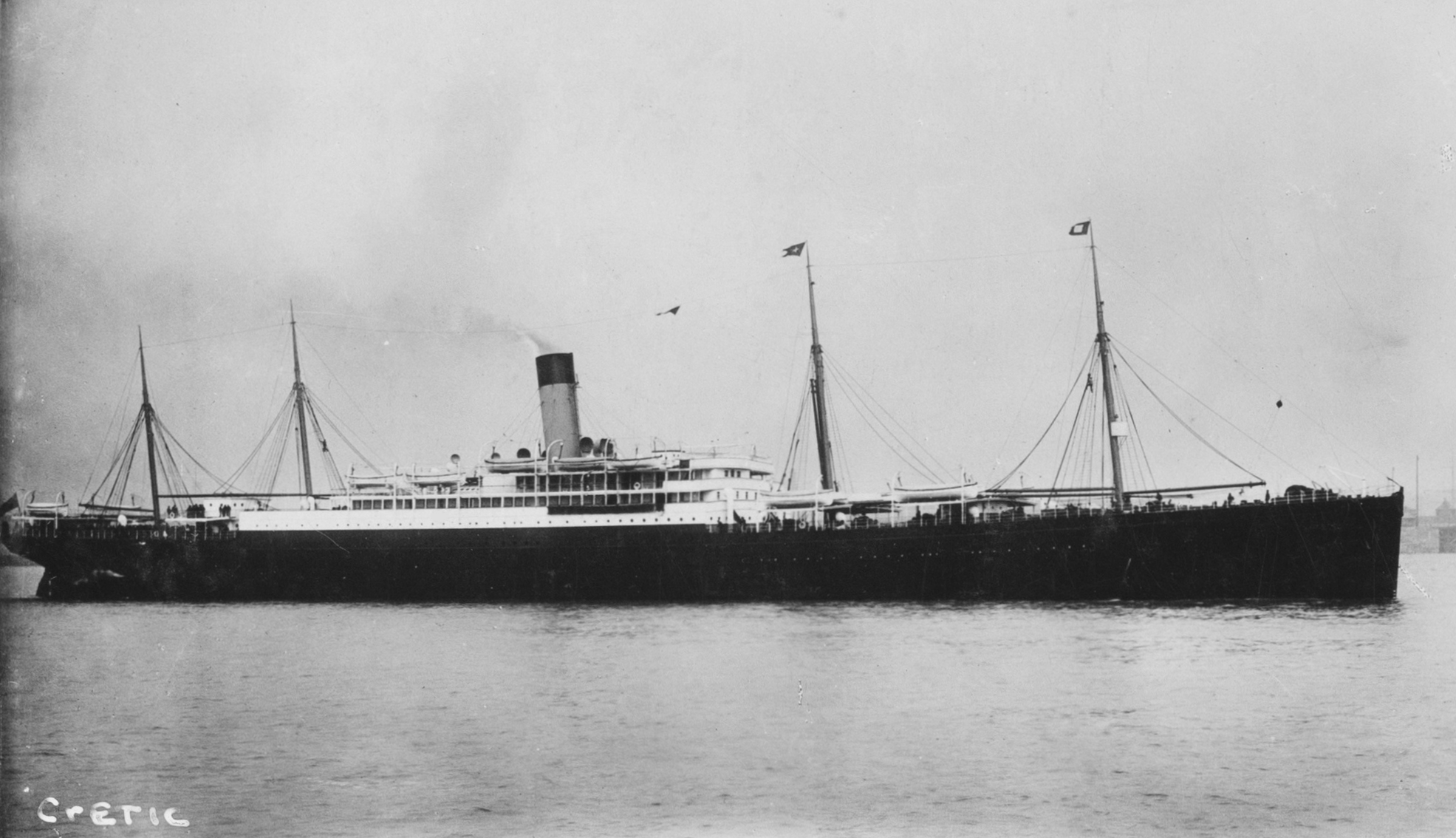
- SS Cretic

History

United Kingdom
- Name: Hanoverian (1902–03); Mayflower (1903); Cretic (1903–23); Devonian (1923–29)
- Owner: International Mercantile Marine Company
- Operator: Leyland Line (1902–03, 1923–29); Dominion Line (1903); White Star Line (1903–23); Red Star Line (1927–28)
- Port of registry: Liverpool
- Builder: R & W Hawthorn, Leslie & Co. Ltd., Hebburn
- Yard number: 381
- Launched: 25 February 1902
- Completed: June 1902
- In service: 19 July 1902
- Out of service: September 1928
- Identification: UK official number 115288; code letters TKPV; call sign MRC (by 1913)
- Fate: Broken up, 1929

General characteristics
- Type: Ocean liner
- Tonnage: 13,507 GRT, 8,663 NRT
- Length: 582.0 ft (177.4 m)
- Beam: 60.3 ft (18.4 m)
- Depth: 38.3 ft (11.7 m)
- Decks: 3
- Installed power: 1,269 NHP
- Propulsion: 2 × 3-cylinder triple expansion steam engines, 1,269 nhp, 2 screws
- Speed: 15 knots (28 km/h; 17 mph)
- Capacity: 1,550 passengers: 260 × 1st class; 250 × 2nd class; 1,000 × 3rd class

SS Cretic was an ocean liner built in 1902. She was operated by several shipping lines, all of which were part of the IMM Co., under several names in her career, which ended when she was scrapped in 1929.

== Ship history ==
The steel-hulled ship was built by R & W Hawthorn, Leslie & Co. Ltd. of Hebburn for Frederick Leyland & Co. and launched on 25 February 1902 as Hanoverian. The 13,507-ton ship was 582 feet long, and 60 feet in the beam. She was powered by two 3-cylinder triple expansion steam engines, delivering 1,269 nhp to two screws.

In July 1902 she serves Leyland Line, for three voyages between Liverpool and Boston before the line's buyout by IMM Co. in October 1902.

Hanoverian was transferred to the Dominion Line and renamed Mayflower, entering service between Liverpool and Boston in April 1903. In November 1903 she was transferred again, this time to the Oceanic Steam Navigation Company's White Star Line, and was renamed Cretic. Initially remaining on the Liverpool-Boston route, in November 1904 she was transferred to routes between the Mediterranean and New York City, finally returning to the Liverpool-Boston route in 1910.

In 1917 she was taken over by the British government under their Liner Requisition Scheme to serve as a troopship in World War I. On 5 April 1918 Cretic, Lapland, and Justicia sailed from Long Island City, New York, with the three battalions of the U.S. 308th Infantry Regiment aboard. On Cretic, the 2,032 men of the 2nd Battalion found that there was only accommodation for 1,500, so the troops were forced to eat and sleep in shifts until arriving at Liverpool on 19 April.

Cretic returned to commercial service in September 1919 on the White Star Line's Mediterranean service. In 1923 Cretic was transferred back to the Leyland Line, and renamed Devonian served on the Liverpool-Boston route until the end of her career in September 1928, apart from making three voyages under charter to the Red Star Line from Antwerp to New York in 1927–28. In 1929 she was broken up by P & W McLellan of Bo’ness, Scotland.
