= SS Florida (1905) =

Italian passenger steamship

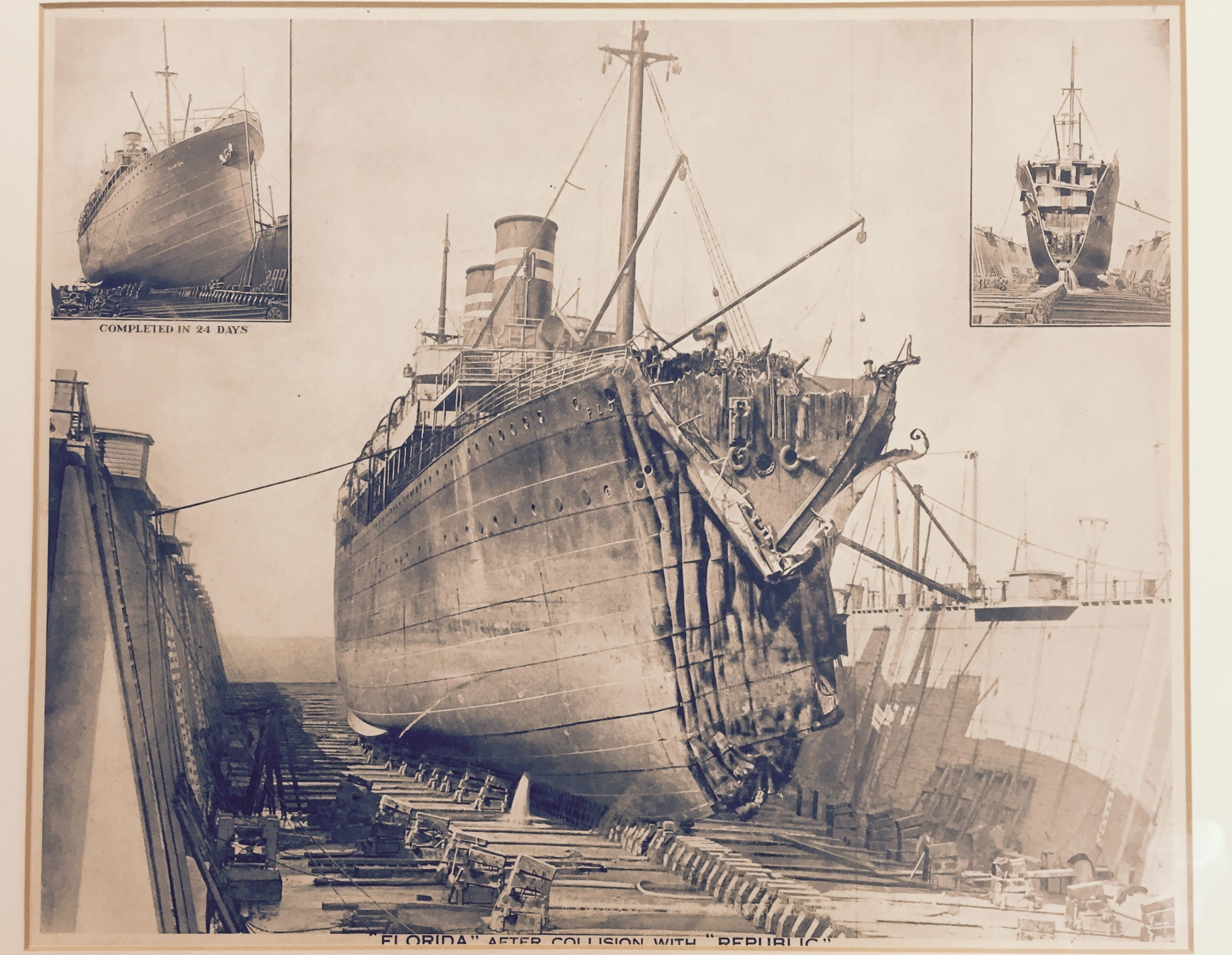
- Florida in 1909, after colliding with RMS Republic

History

Italy
- Name: 1905: Florida; 1912: Cavour
- Namesake: 1905: Florida; 1912: Count of Cavour
- Owner: 1905: Lloyd Italiano; 1912: Ligure Brasiliana; 1915: Transatlantica Italiana
- Operator: 1912: Angelo Parodi fu B
- Port of registry: 1905: Naples; 1912: Genoa
- Route: 1905: Genoa – Naples – Buenos Aires; 1905: Genoa – Palermo – New York; 1912: Genoa – Naples – Buenos Aires
- Builder: Società Esercizio Bacini, Riva Trigoso
- Yard number: 35
- Launched: 22 June 1905
- Maiden voyage: 18 September 1905
- Identification: code letters PHGC; circa 1912: call sign MAV; by 1914: call sign IUC
- Fate: sunk by collision, 12 Dec 1917

General characteristics
- Type: passenger steamship
- Tonnage: 5,018 GRT, 3,100 NRT
- Length: 381.4 ft (116.3 m)
- Beam: 48.1 ft (14.7 m)
- Depth: 25.7 ft (7.8 m)
- Decks: 3
- Installed power: 2 × triple-expansion engines; 444 NHP
- Propulsion: 2 × screws
- Speed: 14 knots (26 km/h)
- Capacity: passengers, as built: 25 × 1st class; 1,600 × steerage; cargo: includes 5,755 cubic feet (163 m^{3}) refrigerated
- Notes: sister ship: Virginia

SS Florida was an Italian transatlantic passenger steamship.She was built in 1905, mainly to carry emigrants. In 1909 she collided with the White Star Liner RMS Republic in the North Atlantic. Seven people were killed, and Republic sank. In 1912 she was renamed Cavour. In 1917 she was involved in a collision with the Italian Auxiliary cruiser Caprera in the Mediterranean. Cavour sank, but no-one was killed.

== Florida and Virginia ==
In 1905 and 1906, Società Esercizio Bacini in Riva Trigoso, near Genoa, built a pair of passenger ships for Lloyd Italiano. Florida was launched on 22 June 1905, and completed that September. Florida's registered length was 381.4 ft (116.3 m); her beam was 48.1 ft (14.7 m), and her depth was 25.7 ft (7.8 m). She had berths for 1,625 passengers: 25 in First Class, and 1,600 in steerage. 5,755 cubic feet (163 m^{3}) of her cargo holds were refrigerated, using a carbon dioxide and brine system made by J & E Hall, Ltd of England. She had twin screws, each driven by a triple-expansion engine that was built by Società Esercizio Bacini. The combined power of her twin engines was rated at 444 NHP, and gave her a speed of 14 knots (26 km/h). She had twin funnels. Lloyd Italiano registered Florida at Naples. Her code letters were PHGC.

On 18 September 1905, Florida began her maiden voyage, which was from Genoa, via Naples, to Buenos Aires. After her first voyage, Lloyd Italiano used her to inaugurate its new route between Genoa and New York via Palermo. She remained on this route until 1911.

Società Esercizio Bacini completed Florida's sister ship, Virginia, in 1906. G Ansaldo, Armstrong & Co of Sampierdarena near Genoa built her engines, which were rated at 477 NHP – slightly more powerful than Florida's.

== Collision with RMS Republic ==
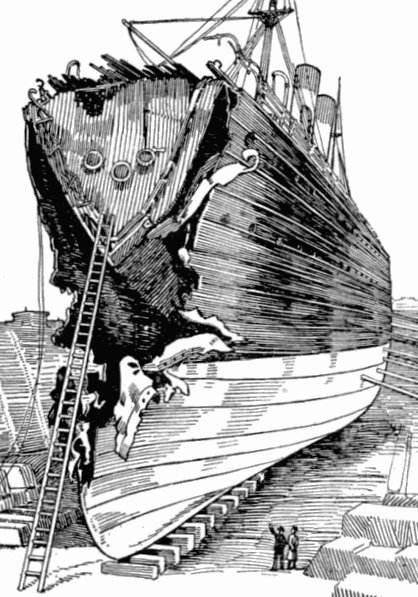
Illustration of Florida's damaged bow

In January 1909, Florida was on her route from Genoa via Palermo to New York, carrying 13 first class and 826 steerage passengers as well as her crew. Her Master was 29-year-old Captain Angelo Ruspini. On the morning of 23 January, Florida entered a thick bank of fog while 50 miles (80 km) off Nantucket, Massachusetts, and consequently reduced her speed. At 05:47 hrs, the White Star Liner Republic, outbound from New York with 525 passengers and 297 crew, appeared through the fog, ahead of Florida. Both ships took evasive action, but Florida's bow struck Republic amidships on her port side at about a right angle, causing water to start entering Republic's engine room and boiler room. Florida's bow was crushed in at least 10 metres (33 ft), back as far as her collision bulkhead, killing three of her crew. Two of Republic's passengers were killed by the impact, and two more died later from their injuries.

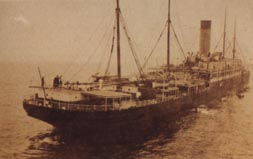
RMS Republic sinking

The two ships separated and, with her collision bulkhead intact, Florida remained afloat. Panic broke out among her passengers, but her officers calmed them. Meanwhile, Republic was taking on water, and at risk of sinking, so Florida stood by, and all of Republic's passengers, and many of her crew, were transferred to her by lifeboat. Florida lacked wireless telegraphy, but Republic had a Marconi Company transceiver, and her wireless officer broadcast CQD distress signals. The wireless station ashore at Siasconset on Nantucket received the signals, and rebroadcast them with its more powerful transmitter. Florida was now dangerously overloaded, but several ships received Siasconset's signals, and that evening, the White Star Liner RMS Baltic managed to find Republic and Florida in the fog. The sea was now rougher, but all passengers of both Republic and Florida were safely transferred from Florida to Baltic. The transfer took all night, and was completed about 08:00 hrs the next morning. Baltic then continued her voyage to New York, where she arrived on 25 January. By that time, other ships had arrived, and one of them took Republic in tow. However, on 24 January, Republic sank south of Martha's Vineyard, and the ship that was towing her rescued her crew. Florida, aided by two tugboats, safely reached New York on 26 January. She was repaired in 24 days.

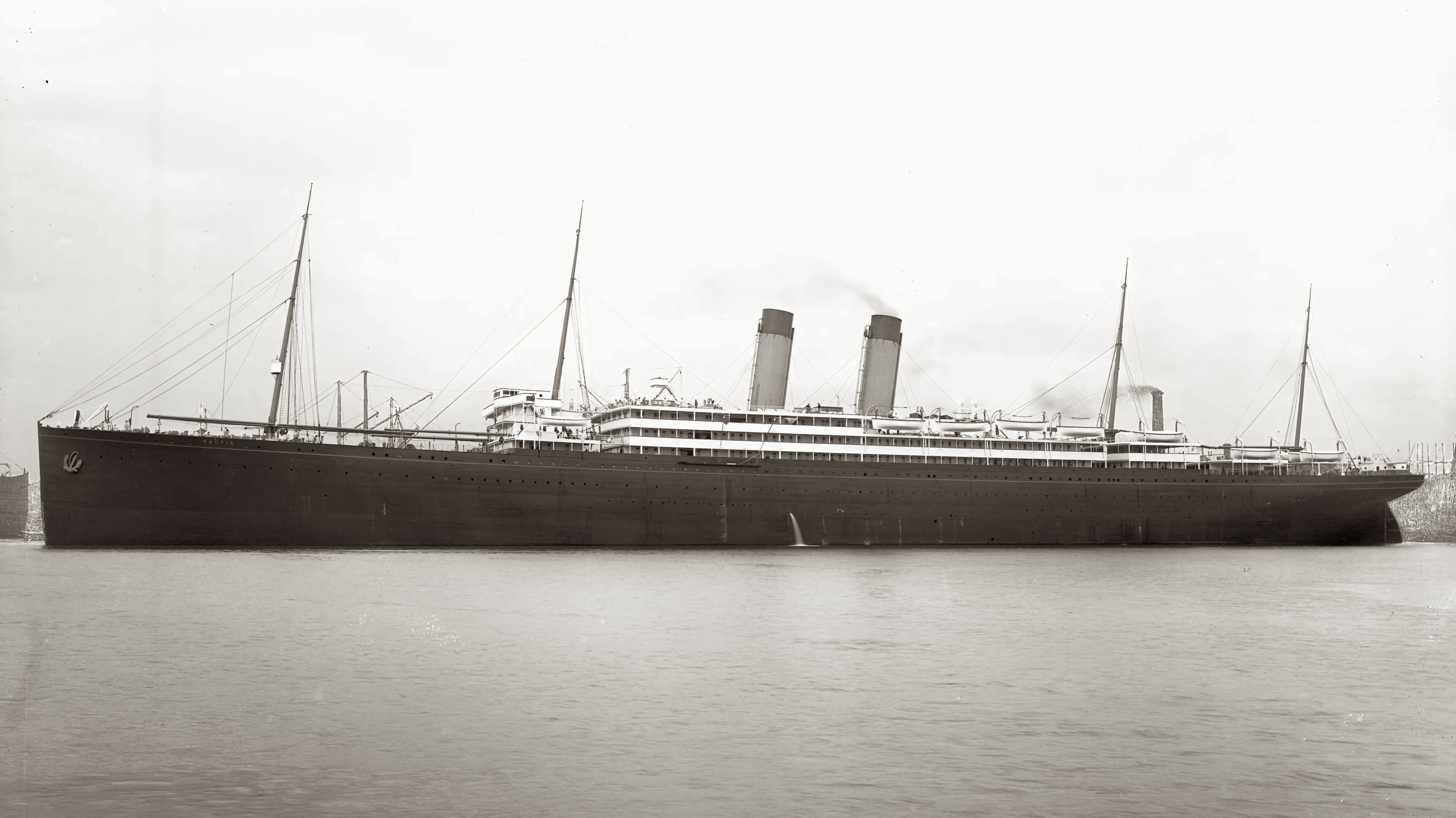
RMS Baltic

As Baltic steamed from the collision site to New York, the passengers aboard her collected money among themselves, from which they decided to have a medal struck for each member of the crews of all three ships. Baltic's passengers included one of the Ingersoll brothers, of the Ingersoll Watch Company, who undertook to have the medals struck. The medals for Republic's wireless operator, and the masters of all three ships, including Captain Ruspini, were struck in gold.

== Later career ==
On 20 April 1911, Florida completed her final voyage to New York. Later that year, the Società di Navigazione la Ligure Brasiliana bought both Florida and Virginia. It transferred their registrations to Genoa, and renamed them Cavour and Garibaldi respectively, after the Count of Cavour, and Giuseppe Garibaldi. Cavour's new owners returned her to the route between Genoa and Buenos Aires via Naples. She started her first voyage on this route from Genoa on 15 January 1912. In 1913, Hamburg America Line (HAPAG) took over Ligure Brasiliana, and in July 1914, the company was renamed Transatlantica Italiana Società Anonima di Navigazione.

By July 1910, Florida was equipped with wireless telegraphy. By about 1912, Cavour's call sign was MAV. By 1914, the Bureau Internationale de L'Union Télégraphique had reorganised the allocation of call signs to ships. All of the call signs allocated to Italy began with "I", and Florida's new call sign was IUC.

After the First World War began, Cavour left Buenos Aires for the final time in October 1914. When Italy joined the war in May 1915, the Italian chairman of Transatlantica Italiana acquired nearly all of HAPAG's shares in the company, and in 1916 resold them to a member of the Ansaldo group.

On 12 December 1917, Cavour was involved in a collision with the Italian auxiliary cruiser Caprera in the western Mediterranean, 2 1/2 nautical miles (5 km) off L'Ametlla de Mar, Spain. Cavour sank, but everyone aboard her survived. Her wreck lies at a depth of 45 to 52 metres (148 to 171 ft)

== Bibliography ==
- Bonsor, Noel RP (1983). South Atlantic Seaway. St Brelade: Brookside Publications. pp. 369–372. ISBN 0-905824-06-7.
- Hancock, HE (1950). Wireless at Sea The First Fifty Years. Marconi International Marine Communication Company.
- Lloyd's Register of British and Foreign Shipping. Vol. I.–Steamers. London: Lloyd's Register of Shipping. 1906 – via Internet Archive.
- Lloyd's Register of British and Foreign Shipping. Vol. I.–Steamers. London: Lloyd's Register of Shipping. 1907 – via Internet Archive.
- Lloyd's Register of British and Foreign Shipping. Vol. I.–Steamers. London: Lloyd's Register of Shipping. 1910 – via Internet Archive.
- Lloyd's Register of British and Foreign Shipping. Vol. II.–Steamers. London: Lloyd's Register of Shipping. 1912 – via Internet Archive.
- The Marconi Press Agency Ltd (1914). The Year Book of Wireless Telegraphy and Telephony. London: The Marconi Press Agency Ltd.
