= SS City of Tokio =

American steamship

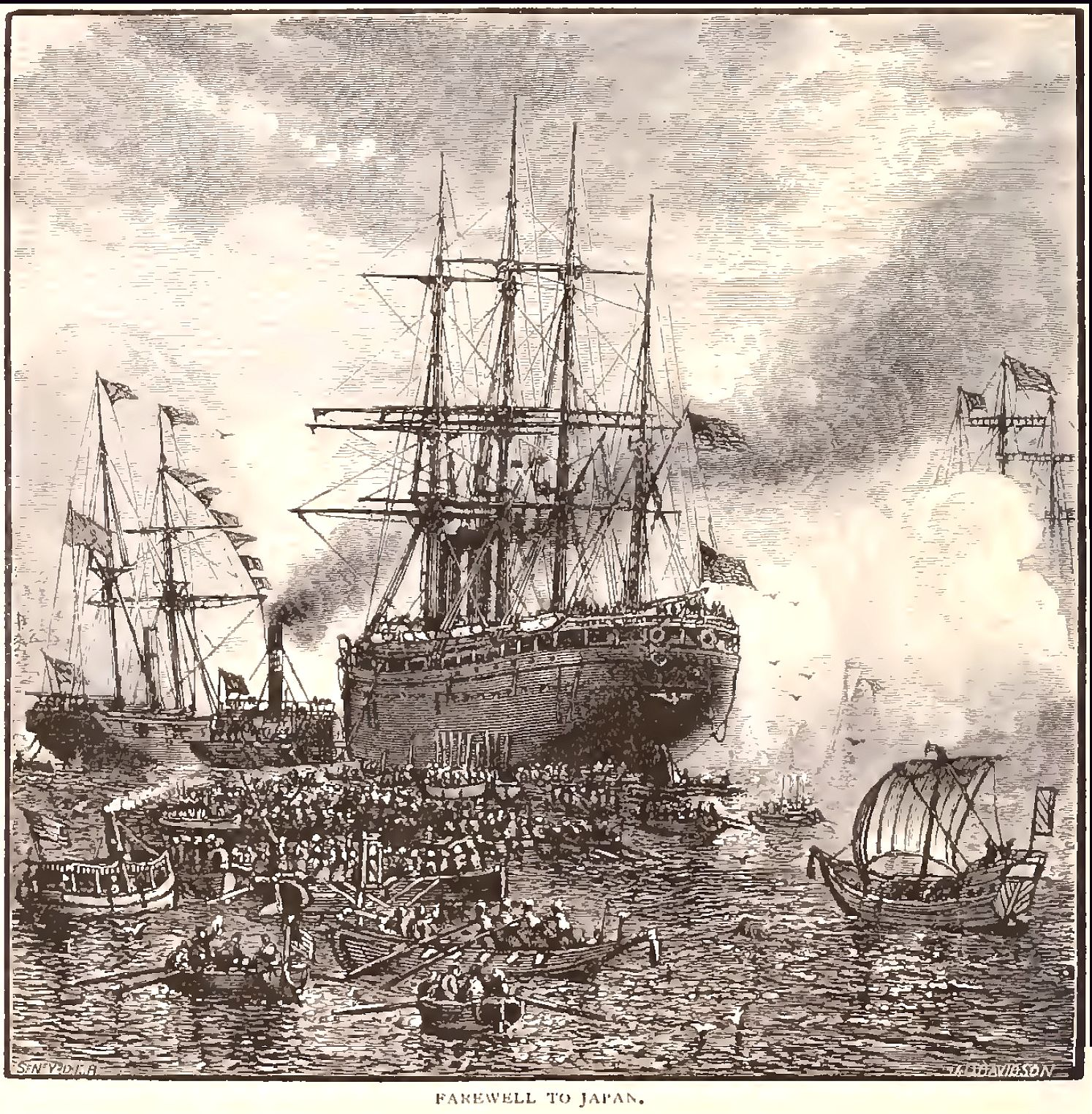

History

United States
- Name: City of Tokio
- Namesake: Tokyo, Japan
- Owner: Pacific Mail Steamship Company
- Operator: Pacific Mail Steamship Company
- Port of registry: New York City, United States of America
- Route: San Francisco to Yokohama and Hong Kong
- Builder: Delaware River Iron Ship Building and Engine Works
- Yard number: 131
- Launched: May 13, 1874
- Maiden voyage: April 1875
- Fate: Wrecked off Tokyo Bay, June 1885

General characteristics
- Type: Passenger freighter
- Tonnage: 5,079 gross
- Length: 423 ft (128.9 m)
- Beam: 47.333 ft (14.4 m)
- Draft: 38.5 ft (11.7 m)
- Propulsion: 5,000 horsepower compound steam engine, screw propeller, auxiliary sails
- Speed: 14.5 knots
- Capacity: 120 1st class, 250 2nd class, 1000 steerage class passengers

SS City of Tokio (sometimes spelled City of Tokyo) was an iron steamship built in 1874 by Delaware River Iron Ship Building and Engine Works for the Pacific Mail Steamship Company. City of Tokio and her sister ship City of Peking were at the time of construction the largest vessels ever built in the United States, and the second largest in the world behind the British leviathan Great Eastern.

Like Great Eastern, construction of the two Pacific Mail ships was to be plagued with financial difficulties, which threatened to bankrupt the shipbuilder. Unlike Great Eastern, however, which was a commercial failure, City of Tokio was to enjoy a successful commercial career until being wrecked at the entrance of Tokyo Bay in 1885.

City of Tokio holds the distinction of being the first ship to bring members of the Issei, or first-generation Japanese migrants, to the United States.

== Construction ==
City of Tokio and City of Peking were ordered by the Pacific Mail Steamship Company in order to take advantage of a new $500,000 congressional subsidy for the company's steam packet service to the Far East. After contracting with the shipyard of John Roach and Sons for construction, Pacific Mail ran into financial difficulties after two company directors squandered the company's cash reserves in a stock speculation scheme and then fled the country with the balance.

Pacific Mail's woes were exacerbated after the stock speculator Jay Gould, in a clandestine attempt to acquire the company's stock cheaply, persuaded the U.S. Congress to rescind its $500,000 annual subsidy. Pacific Mail's inability to meet its financial obligations threatened in turn the survival of the shipbuilder John Roach and Sons, which had already invested more than a million dollars in constructing the two ships, but Roach was able to hold off his own creditors. Roach eventually renegotiated the Pacific Mail contract, reducing the latter's monthly obligations from $75,000 to $35,000, and the two vessels were launched in 1874.

== Service history ==
=== Maiden voyage ===
On her maiden voyage in February 1875, City of Tokio's sister ship City of Peking lost propeller blades, and also required the replacement of 5,000 rivets, amounting to a total repair bill of $300,000. When City of Tokio made her own maiden voyage in April of the same year, she too suffered the loss of propeller blades.

The problems were eventually diagnosed as improper loading of the ships combined with weak wooden decks. The wooden decks on both vessels were subsequently replaced by iron, after which both established an enviable record of reliability.

=== Route, cargo and passengers ===
Like her sister ship City of Peking, City of Tokio was utilized exclusively on the Far Eastern steam packet service, operating from the Port of San Francisco to Yokohama, Japan and Hong Kong. Both vessels transported Chinese, and later Japanese, migrants to the United States, as well as exporting foodstuffs and manufactured goods and importing a range of goods including silk, tea, hemp, spices and opium.

==== President Grant's world tour ====
In 1877, United States President Ulysses S. Grant embarked on a highly successful world tour, during which he was greeted at every port of call as the hero of the recently concluded Civil War.

Grant departed the United States on the first leg of his tour on May 17, 1877, on the American Line's Pennsylvania-class steamship Indiana. He returned home almost two and a half years later on board City of Tokio, arriving at San Francisco on September 20, 1879.

A contemporary account described the arrival thus:

A fleet of steamers and yachts met the City of Tokio down the bay, while guns boomed until the harbor was cloudy with smoke, bells rang, and factory whistles tooted and screamed. Every vantage point overlooking the channel was black with cheering crowds.

It was dusk when the General landed. A great procession was awaiting him, and escorted him, through streets draped with bunting and bright with thousands of lights and bonfires, to the Palace Hotel, where a chorus of five hundred voices sang an ode of greeting.

Cheered by crowds at every station, Grant eventually reached Philadelphia, his original point of departure two and half years earlier, on December 12, 1879.

==== Japanese migrants ====
After the Chinese Exclusion Act was passed in 1882, American industrialists began to look elsewhere for reliable sources of cheap labor. The Japanese government had forbidden emigration since 1868, but in the 1880s it relaxed some of its restrictions. In 1884, the Kingdom of Hawaii offered to subsidize the transport of Japanese laborers to its territory, and advertised a set of conditions under which the migrants would be employed on its sugar plantations.

On February 8, 1885, the first group of 943 Japanese – 676 men, 159 women, and 108 children – arrived in Honolulu, on board City of Tokio. This group was the very first in the wave of immigration whose members would later be dubbed Issei, or first-generation Japanese migrants.

=== Shipwreck ===
City of Tokio's service was to end prematurely. In the early hours of 24 June 1885, in conditions of poor visibility, City of Tokio was grounded on rocks at the entrance to Tokyo Bay. At first it seemed as if the ship could be refloated, but the onset of a typhoon rendered salvage impossible, and the storm damaged the ship beyond repair. Fortunately, all of the passengers and some of the cargo were safely removed before the vessel foundered.

== Recurring references ==
- Kuykendall, Ralph S. (1967): The Hawaiian Kingdom: Volume 3 – The Kalakaua Dynasty, 1874–1893, University of Hawaii Press, ISBN 978-0-87022-433-1.
- Swann, Leonard Alexander Jr. (1965): John Roach, Maritime Entrepreneur: the Years as Naval Contractor 1862–1886 – United States Naval Institute (reprinted 1980 by Ayer Publishing, ISBN 978-0-405-13078-6).
- Tate, E. Mowbray (1986): Transpacific Steam: The Story of Steam Navigation from the Pacific Coast of North America to the Far East and the Antipodes, 1867-–1941 – Associated University Presses, ISBN 978-0-8453-4792-8.
- Tyler, David B. (1958): The American Clyde: A History of Iron and Steel Shipbuilding on the Delaware from 1840 to World War I, University of Delaware Press (reprinted 1992, ISBN 978-0-87413-101-7).
