= SS Ohio (1872) =

Passenger-cargo steamship

- SS Ohio anchored off Nome, Alaska, 1907

History
- Name: SS Ohio
- Namesake: Ohio, USA
- Owner: American Line
- Operator: American Steamship Company
- Port of registry: United States
- Builder: William Cramp & Sons, Philadelphia
- Cost: $520,000
- Yard number: 181
- Launched: October 30, 1872
- Maiden voyage: August 7, 1873
- Refit: 1887
- Fate: Wrecked off the coast of British Columbia, August 26, 1909

General characteristics
- Class & type: Pennsylvania class passenger-cargo ship
- Tonnage: 3,104 gross
- Length: 343 ft
- Beam: 43 ft
- Depth of hold: 32 ft 2 in
- Propulsion: Compound (later triple expansion) steam engine, single screw, auxiliary sails
- Speed: 11.5 knots
- Capacity: 46 x 1st-, 132 2nd class and 789 steerage passengers

SS Ohio was an iron passenger-cargo steamship built by William Cramp & Sons in 1872. The second of a series of four Pennsylvania-class vessels, Ohio and her three sister ships—Pennsylvania, Indiana and Illinois—were the largest iron ships ever built in the United States at the time of their construction, and amongst the first to be fitted with compound steam engines. They were also the first ships to challenge British dominance of the transatlantic trade since the American Civil War.

Ohio spent most of her career on the Liverpool-Philadelphia route she had originally been designed to service. After 25 years of transatlantic crossings, Ohio was sold in 1898 for service in the Alaskan gold rush. She was wrecked in British Columbian waters in 1909.

== Development ==
The four Pennsylvania class liners were constructed at a cost of $520,000 each by William Cramp & Sons on behalf of the American Steamship Company (ASC), a subsidiary of the Pennsylvania Railroad Company. The Railroad intended to utilize the vessels to bring European immigrants direct to Philadelphia, thus ensuring the company a steady stream of customers. In recognition of this purpose, the four ships - Pennsylvania, Indiana, Illinois and Ohio - were named after the four states serviced by the Railroad. Design of the ships was entrusted to Charles H. Cramp of the Cramp & Sons shipyard, and Barnabas H. Bartol, a director of the ASC.

== Construction ==
At 3,000 gross tons apiece, the ships were 1,000 tons larger than any iron ship previously constructed in the United States, and Cramp & Sons was forced to undertake a substantial upgrade of its facilities to complete them. The company established an entirely new shipyard for construction of the vessels, serviced by its own blacksmith, engine, boiler and carpentry shops, as well as providing it with a 700-foot (210 m) outfitting wharf. Cost of the real estate alone was in excess of $265,000, and Cramp & Sons was obliged to incorporate as the William Cramp & Sons Engine and Ship Building Company in order to limit the financial risk involved. Fortuitously, Cramp & Sons had only recently built its first compound marine steam engine, and consequently the shipyard was able to install the vessels with the latest in engine technology.

The original contract called for Ohio to be completed by November 1, 1872, but the schedule proved optimistic. A short-lived shipbuilding boom in the early 1870s made it difficult for the Cramp shipyard to obtain iron plates and other materials, and the yard was also affected by shortages of skilled labor. The ship's launch consequently did not take place until October 30, and she was not completed for delivery until well into the following year.

== Service history ==
Ohio's maiden voyage took place on August 7, 1873, on the Philadelphia-Queenstown-Liverpool route. She would continue working this route almost without interruption for the next 22 years.

=== 1870s ===
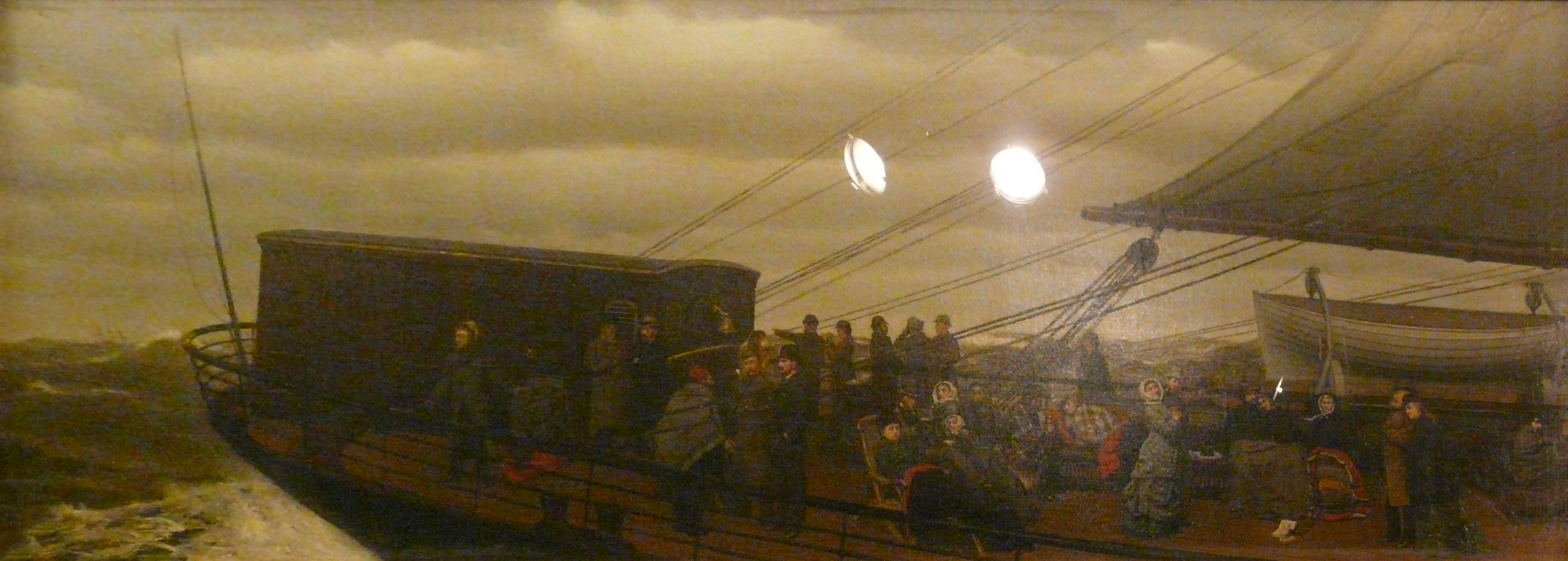
SS Ohio Mid-Ocean

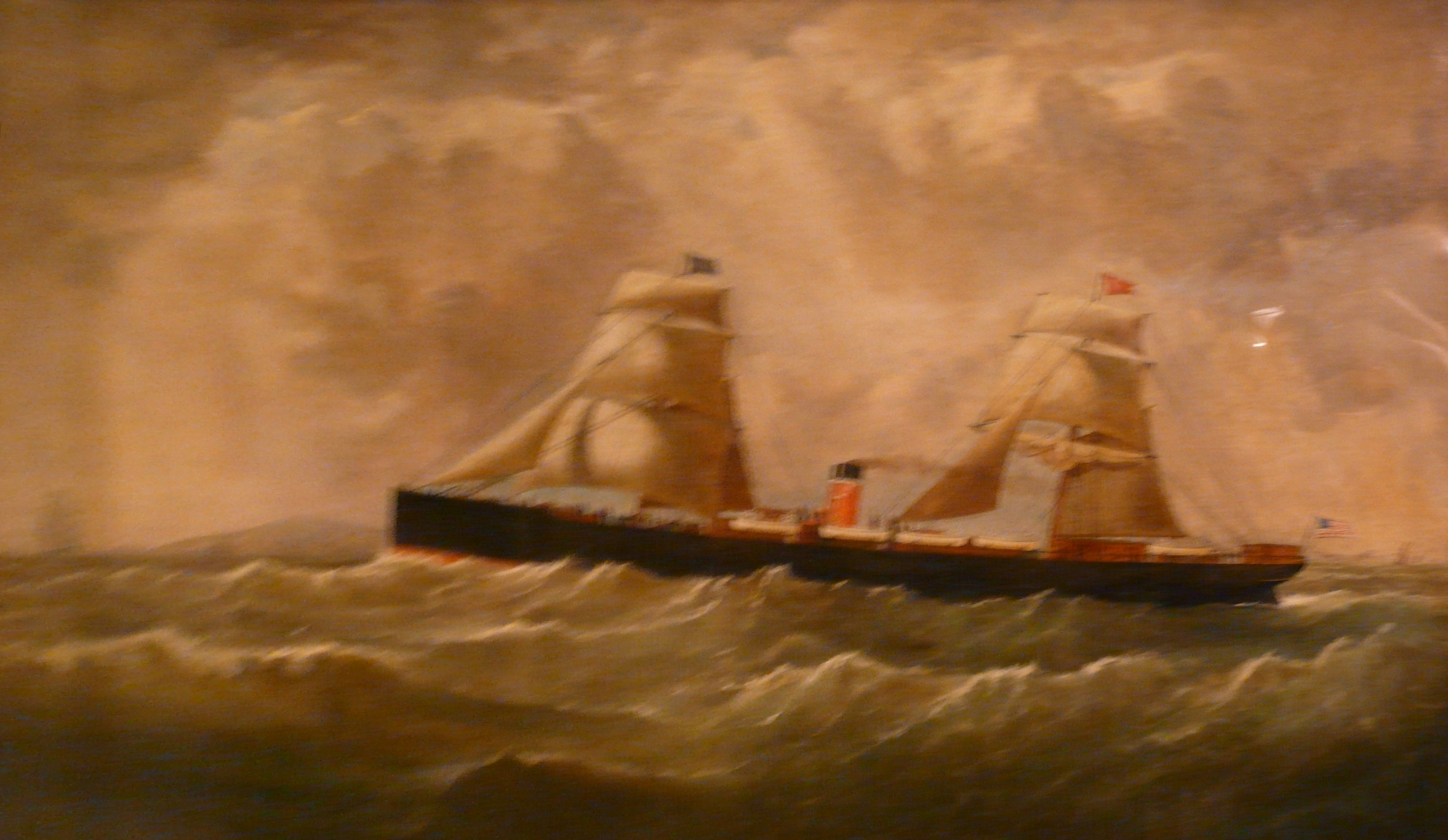
SS Ohio

Ohio's first few months of service proved eventful. The winter of 1873-74 was particularly bad on the Atlantic, and on a late winter voyage to Liverpool, Ohio lost two lifeboats, while her after wheelhouse was damaged beyond repair by the waves. During a March crossing to Philadelphia, the ship was so battered by heavy seas that she suffered damage to her bow. In May, some of Ohio's cargo caught fire between Liverpool and Queenstown. After the fire was extinguished, the ship resumed her voyage to Liverpool, but the cargo caught fire a second time, and was only finally extinguished by a combination of battening the hatches to starve the flames of oxygen and the use of steam pumps. In February of the same year, the wooden bridge of Ohio's sister ship Pennsylvania was torn from the vessel in a hurricane, and a new iron bridge was subsequently installed on all four of the Pennsylvania class vessels.

In 1875, a decision was made to increase the first class complement of all Pennsylvania class vessels from 75 to 100.

==== Failed experimental fruit shipment ====
With the American Line struggling to turn a profit in the wake of the 1873 financial panic, the company decided to experiment with some novel exports. The first such experiment involved a large shipment of peaches onboard Ohio.

Delaware fruit growers had experienced a bumper year in 1875, and a glut of peaches on the local market had depressed the price correspondingly. Seeking to take advantage of the situation, the ASC's management placed advertisements offering to ship the surplus fruit to the United Kingdom in specially ventilated compartments on Ohio. The ASC organized a train to pick up the fruit, and the response was overwhelming, with over 4,500 baskets of peaches delivered. Ohio sailed for Liverpool with its cargo of peaches in late August.

The ASC had hoped to keep the fruit fresh during the transatlantic crossing by installing steam powered blowers to circulate an air current over the peaches through several tons of ice, but the ice was soon melted by heat from the ship's boilers and the sunny weather. By the time the ship reached Liverpool, the shipment of peaches had completely decomposed and was utterly worthless.

Undeterred by this failure, the ASC next attempted a shipment of fresh meat on board Illinois, utilizing much the same technique. This time, the ice held out, and the meat arrived in Liverpool in excellent condition. A second shipment of meat was subsequently made; however, reliable shipments of fresh meat across the Atlantic would have to wait for the invention of refrigeration twenty years later.

=== 1880s ===
In 1882, the wooden pilothouse in the bow of all four Pennsylvania class ships was replaced with an iron one for safety reasons.

In 1883–84, inspections revealed that all four Pennsylvania class ships required immediate maintenance to their hulls, which needed strengthening. The repairs were carried out at a cost of $25,000 per vessel, but the additional costs probably contributed to the Pennsylvania Railroad's decision to wind up the American Steamship Company, which because of the after effects of the 1873 panic had always struggled to make a profit. With the demise of the ASC, Ohio and her three sister ships were transferred to management of the PRR's other shipping line, the Red Star Line, but Ohio continued to service her familiar Liverpool-Philadelphia route.

Ohio had a major refit with the installation of a triple-expansion steam engine to replace her original compound steam engine in 1887. The new engine, built and installed by James Howell of Glasgow, was smaller, allowing for more cargo space, and more economical to run. Ohio's first class accommodation was also rebuilt. That same year, Ohio was switched from the Liverpool-Philadelphia run to the Liverpool-New York City route. She commenced her first such crossing on August 16, 1887, and made her thirteenth and last voyage on this route commencing February 20, 1889.

=== City of Paris incident ===
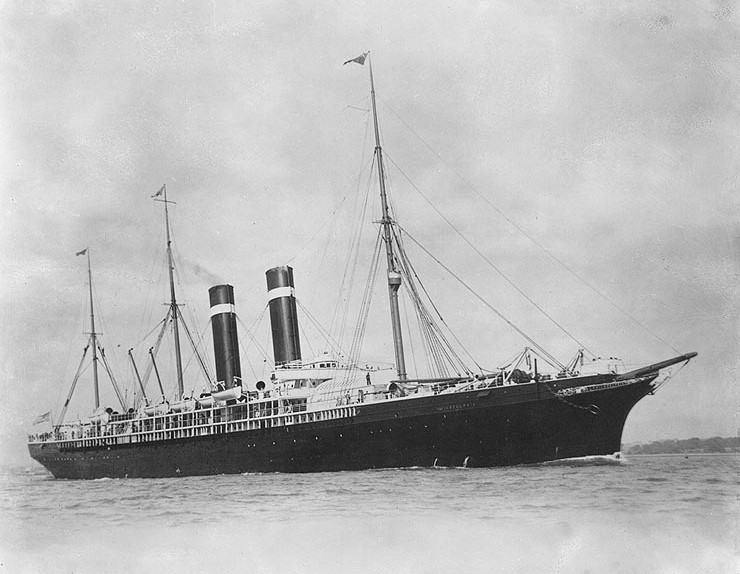
City of Paris

In 1890, Ohio was on her way to the United States when she encountered her fellow Red Star liner City of Paris being towed back to Liverpool by the steamship Aldersgate and accompanied by the White Star liner Adriatic. City of Paris had suffered a catastrophic engine failure 200 miles (320 km) out from Liverpool that had shredded her engine and perforated the hull, causing the ship to take water. Ohio promptly turned around and joined the two vessels escorting the ship to safe harbor, which was achieved March 29 at Cork, by which time the stern of the stricken vessel was drawing 35 feet (11 m) and her bow was high out the water.

=== To 1897 ===
By 1892, Ohio was the only remaining vessel of the Pennsylvania class to be carrying first class passengers, all three of her sister ships having been downgraded to cabin class. In 1893, she began sailing under the colours of the prestigious Inman Line, which had recently been acquired by the Red Star Line. Ohio maintained the Liverpool-Queenstown-Philadelphia service through the early 1890s, commencing her last such crossing on August 25, 1895.

In 1896, Ohio was transferred to the New York–Southampton route, commencing her first such crossing on June 27 of that year. Her final North Atlantic voyage began when she sailed on August 22, 1897, from Kiel to Southampton and thence to New York.

=== Alaskan gold rush ===
Following the discovery of gold in Alaska in 1896, great demand was created for American-flagged ships to transport gold prospectors to Alaska during the resulting gold rush. Clement Acton Griscom, the executive head of the Inman Line, took advantage of this demand to sell the ageing and outdated Pennsylvania class vessels at a premium.

On March 5, 1898, Ohio sailed from Philadelphia to San Francisco on the Pacific Coast. There, the vessel was sold to the Alaska Steamship Company, and subsequently commenced servicing the Seattle-Nome route, which she was to maintain to the end.

In 1907, Ohio struck an iceberg in the Bering Sea. Although the vessel survived the collision, 75 panicked passengers jumped overboard onto the ice, resulting in the loss of four lives. In 1908, Ohio's captain, mindful of the previous year's accident, infuriated his passengers by refusing to complete the journey before the ice melted.

On August 26, 1909, Ohio hit an uncharted rock (which is now named Ohio Rock) at Sarah Island at the South end of Heikish narrows and the North end of Finlayson Channel, British Columbia, but the captain was able to beach the ship before she sank, saving the lives of all but four of the 214 passengers and crew. Michael James Heney died a year later from hypothermia caused from too much time in the frigid waters. Ohio's career thus came to an end after 36 years of service.
