= Pennsylvania class =

There have been three ship classes with the name Pennsylvania. They are:

- Pennsylvania-class battleship - a class of two United States battleships launched in 1915;
- Pennsylvania-class cruiser - a class of six United States cruisers built between 1901 and 1908;
- Pennsylvania-class steamship - a class of four United States passenger steamships built by William Cramp & Sons between 1872 and 1874.
