= SS Illinois =

A number of steamships have been named SS Illinois, including:

- SS Illinois (1873)
- SS Illinois (1917)
