= SS Indiana (1873) =

Iron passenger-cargo steamship in service 1873-1909

- SS Indiana, probably in the early 1890s

History

United States
- Name: SS Indiana
- Namesake: Indiana, USA
- Owner: American Line
- Operator: American Steamship Company
- Port of registry: United States
- Builder: William Cramp & Sons, Philadelphia
- Cost: $520,000
- Yard number: 182
- Launched: March 25, 1873
- Maiden voyage: October 27, 1873
- Refit: 1891
- Fate: Wrecked off Cape Tosco, Mexico, April 4, 1909

General characteristics
- Class & type: Pennsylvania class passenger-cargo ship
- Tonnage: 3,104 gross
- Length: 343 ft
- Beam: 43 ft
- Depth of hold: 32 ft 2 in
- Propulsion: Compound (later triple expansion) steam engine, single screw, auxiliary sails
- Speed: 11.5 knots
- Capacity: 46 x 1st-, 132 2nd class and 789 steerage passengers

SS Indiana was an iron passenger-cargo steamship built by William Cramp & Sons of Philadelphia in 1873. The third of a series of four Pennsylvania-class vessels, Indiana and her three sister ships – Pennsylvania, Ohio and Illinois – were the largest iron ships ever built in the United States at the time of their construction, and among the first to be fitted with compound steam engines. They were also the first ships to challenge British dominance of the transatlantic trade since the American Civil War.

Though soon outclassed by newer vessels, Indiana was to enjoy a substantial 36-year career, a highlight of which was her transportation of United States President Ulysses S. Grant on the first leg of his celebrated 1877–78 world tour. After 24 years of transatlantic crossings, Indiana was sold for Pacific service, before being requisitioned as a troopship for service during the Spanish–American War. She was wrecked off Isla Santa Margarita, Mexico, in 1909.

== Development ==
The four Pennsylvania class liners were constructed at a cost of $520,000 each by William Cramp & Sons on behalf of the American Steamship Company (ASC), a subsidiary of the Pennsylvania Railroad Company. The Railroad intended to utilize the vessels to bring European immigrants direct to Philadelphia, thus ensuring the company a steady stream of customers. In recognition of this purpose, the four ships—Pennsylvania, Indiana, Illinois and Ohio—were named after the four states serviced by the Railroad. Design of the ships was entrusted to Charles H. Cramp of the Cramp & Sons shipyard, and Barnabas H. Bartol, a director of the ASC.

== Construction ==
At a planned 3,000 gross tons apiece, the ships would be 1,000 tons larger than any iron ship previously constructed in the United States, and Cramp & Sons was forced to undertake a substantial upgrade of its facilities to complete them. The company established an entirely new shipyard for construction of the vessels, serviced by its own blacksmith, engine, boiler and carpentry shops, as well as providing it with a 700-foot outfitting wharf. Cost of the real estate alone was in excess of $265,000, and Cramp & Sons was obliged to incorporate as the William Cramp & Sons Engine and Ship Building Company in order to limit the financial risk involved. Fortuitously, Cramp & Sons had only recently built its first compound marine steam engine, and consequently the shipyard was able to install the vessels with the latest in engine technology.

The original contract called for Pennsylvania to be completed by December 1, 1872, but the schedule proved optimistic. A short-lived shipbuilding boom in the early 1870s made it difficult for the Cramp shipyard to obtain iron plates and other materials, and the yard was also affected by shortages of skilled labor. As a consequence, the ship would not be ready for delivery until almost ten months later.

== Service history ==
=== 1870s ===
Indiana was launched on March 25, 1873, and made her maiden voyage on October 27. Like her sister ships, Indiana's initial route was Philadelphia-Queenstown-Liverpool, a route she would maintain for the entirety of her 24-year transatlantic service, with the apparent exception of only a handful of voyages.

After the wooden bridge of Indiana's sister ship Pennsylvania was torn from the vessel in a February 1874 hurricane, a new iron bridge was subsequently installed on all four of the Pennsylvania class vessels. Later that year, on June 18, Indiana was selected to host a celebratory event for the American Steamship Company's board of directors. After a tour of the ship, followed by dinner and toasts, the directors left well satisfied with what they had seen. The following year, a decision was made to increase the first class complement of all Pennsylvania class vessels from 75 to 100.

On February 29, 1876, Indiana became grounded upon the Bulkhead Bar in the Delaware River, but she was freed the next morning without damage.

=== Participation in Grant's world tour ===
A highlight of Indiana's career occurred when the vessel was selected to convey U.S. President Ulysses S. Grant on the initial leg of his world tour. The tour was destined to be highly successful, with Civil War hero Grant greeted with great enthusiasm and ceremony at every port of call.

The tour departure date was set for May 17, 1877, and Grant spent the morning at a champagne breakfast hosted by Pennsylvania Governor John F. Hartranft. Arrangements had been made for Grant and his party to join Indiana downstream, away from the crowds that had gathered to watch the departure. Boarding the steamer Twilight, Grant and his entourage sailed to rendezvous with Indiana in midstream near New Castle, Delaware, accompanied by a huge flotilla of decorated yachts and tugs and a chorus of ships' horns and whistles.

The voyage to Liverpool encountered unusually rough weather, and many of the passengers suffered from seasickness, but Grant later reported that neither he nor his wife were afflicted. Arriving at Liverpool on May 28, Grant was surprised to find the harbor filled with gaily decorated welcoming vessels, and the streets packed with cheering crowds, prompting him to remark that his reception was "as hearty and as enthusiastic as in Philadelphia on our departure". He subsequently decided to extend his stay in the city by a day before travelling on to London.

Grant and his wife eventually returned triumphantly to the United States on board the Pacific Mail steamship City of Tokio on September 20, 1879.

=== 1880s–1897 ===
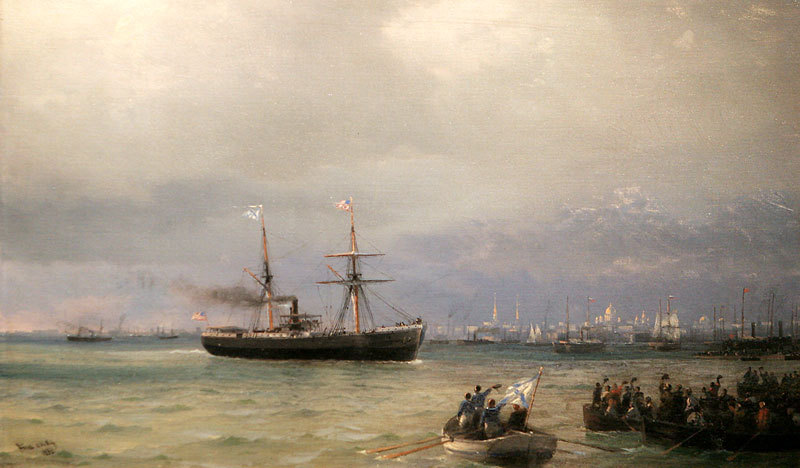
Ivan Aivazovsky. The Relief Ship (1892)

In 1882, the wooden pilothouse in the bow of all four Pennsylvania class ships was replaced with an iron one for safety reasons.

In 1883–84, inspections revealed that all four Pennsylvania class ships required immediate maintenance to their hulls, which needed strengthening. The repairs were carried out at a cost of $25,000 per vessel, but the additional costs probably contributed to the Pennsylvania Railroad's decision to wind up the American Steamship Company, which because of the after effects of the 1873 panic had always struggled to make a profit. With the demise of the ASC, Indiana and her three sister ships were transferred to management of the PRR's other shipping line, the Red Star Line, but Indiana continued to service her familiar Liverpool–Philadelphia route.

In March 1889, Indiana made a single Antwerp to New York voyage under charter to the Red Star Line, one of apparently only a handful of transatlantic crossings by the vessel that were not made on the Liverpool-Philadelphia route.

Indiana had a major refit with the installation of a triple-expansion steam engine to replace her original compound steam engine in 1891. The new engine, built and installed by James Howell of Glasgow, was smaller, allowing for more cargo space, and was more economical to run. At the same time, she was refitted to accommodate only intermediate and third class passengers.

In 1892, Indiana made a voyage to Czarist Russia with a cargo of grain destined for famine relief. The relief voyage was a result of the sympathetic relationship that had built up between Russia and Philadelphia via warship contracts awarded by the Russian Navy to the shipyard of William Cramp & Sons, which had kept the Philadelphian waterfront busy during an economic downturn.

Indiana thereafter continued servicing her familiar Liverpool-Philadelphia route until 1897. She made her last transatlantic crossing commencing December 1, 1897.

=== Spanish–American War ===
Following the discovery of gold in Alaska in 1896, great demand was created for American-flagged ships to transport gold prospectors to Alaska during the resulting gold rush. Clement Acton Griscom, the executive head of the Inman Line, took advantage of this demand to sell the by now outdated Pennsylvania class vessels at a premium.

On March 28, 1898, Indiana sailed from Philadelphia to Seattle on the Pacific Coast. There, the vessel was sold to the Empire Line for service on the Seattle–Nome route. However, in April 1898 the Spanish–American War broke out, and Indiana was requisitioned by the U.S. Navy as a troopship. Later in the war, she served as a hospital ship, returning wounded troops from Manila, Philippines via Honolulu to San Francisco. Nine of the wounded died during the voyage.

=== Final years ===
After the war, Indiana was acquired by the Pacific Mail Steamship Company, which utilized her from New York to South America as well as in the Northwest. On April 4, 1909, Indiana was grounded off Cape Tosco, Isla Santa Margarita, Mexico. The accident tore out the ship's bottom, flooding her three holds and engine compartment to a depth of about sixteen feet. Fortunately, passengers, cargo and crew were safely removed. The vessel's wreckage was subsequently sold for $5,000 salvage, bringing an end to a long and varied 36-year long career.
