= Pennsylvania-class steamship =

Class of cargo-passenger ships

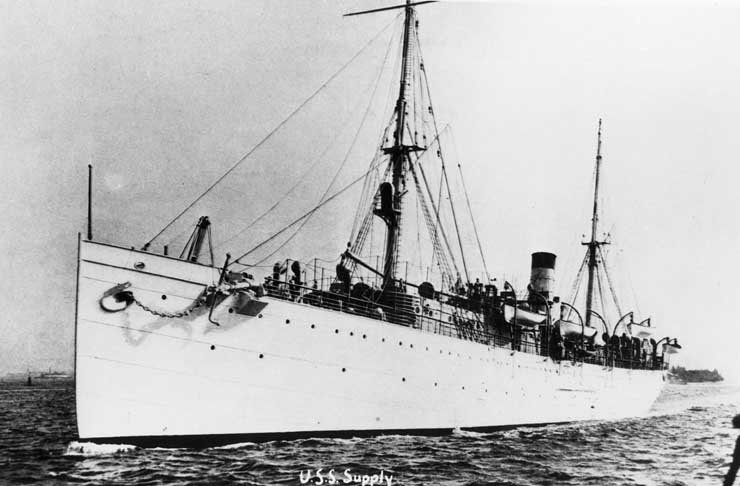
- USS Supply (formerly the Pennsylvania-class steamship Illinois)

Class overview
- Name: Pennsylvania
- Builders: William Cramp & Sons
- Operators: American Line
- Cost: US$520,000 each; (US$13,975,000 each in current dollars)
- Built: 1872–1874
- In service: 1873–1921
- Completed: 4
- Lost: 3
- Retired: 1

General characteristics
- Type: Cargo-passenger liners
- Tonnage: 3,104 gross
- Length: 343–355 ft
- Beam: 43 ft
- Installed power: Steam, auxiliary sails
- Propulsion: 1,400 horsepower compound engine, single propeller
- Speed: 11.5 knots
- Complement: 83

The Pennsylvania class was a class of four cargo-passenger liners built by the Philadelphian shipbuilder William Cramp & Sons in 1872–73. Intended for the newly established American Line, the four ships—Pennsylvania, Ohio, Indiana and Illinois—were at the time the largest iron ships yet built in the United States, and were launched with considerable fanfare. Upon entering service in 1874, they became the first American-built steamships to challenge British dominance of the transatlantic trade since the American Civil War.

Although soon outclassed by newer and larger vessels, all four of the Pennsylvania class steamships were to enjoy long and distinguished careers, the last of them being retired from service in 1921.

== Development ==
Since 1850, the Pennsylvania Railroad Company (PRR) had enjoyed a lucrative partnership with the British Inman Line, which transported European immigrants from Liverpool direct to Philadelphia, thus ensuring the Railroad a steady stream of customers. In 1857, the Inman Line switched its destination to New York, depriving the Pennsylvania Railroad of this lucrative trade. The Railroad made its first attempt to compensate for the lost traffic by organizing its own steamship line in 1863 (during the American Civil War), but the plan was dropped after the Philadelphia city council declined to provide financial support.

After a failed attempt to gain control of a Scottish shipping line, the Anchor Line, in 1870, Pennsylvania Railroad decided to try establishing its own shipping line once again. It petitioned the Pennsylvania State Legislature for a charter for a new company to be known as the American Steamship Company (ASC), created to manage a new shipping line known as the American Line, which would be American's first transatlantic line since the end of the American Civil War. The Legislature granted the ASC its company charter in April 1871.

The ASC convened its first meeting on April 4, 1871, at which a committee was appointed by the company directors to recommend suitable vessels for its operations. The committee recommended the purchase of four iron steamships of 3,000 or more gross tons, capable of attaining a speed of 11.5 knots and of carrying 75 first class and 1,000 steerage passengers—specifications which were designed to ensure the new shipping line's competitiveness with existing transatlantic lines. The committee's recommendations were subsequently approved by the directors, and a public contract for the four vessels put out to tender.

Four bids were eventually submitted, ranging as high as $660,000 per ship. The bidders were John Roach & Sons, William Cramp & Sons, Neafie & Levy and Dialogue & Wood—all Philadelphia firms. The winning bidder was Cramp & Sons, which submitted the lowest bid of $520,000 per unit, and the contract for all four ships was subsequently signed with that company on August 30. Design of the vessels was entrusted to the marine architect Barnabus H. Bartol, a director of the American Line, and the head of the Cramp shipyard, Charles Cramp.

== Construction ==
In 1871, no American shipyard was equipped to build even a single ship of the dimensions of the Pennsylvania class, let alone an entire class of such vessels. The largest iron ship built in the United States to date was Harlan and Hollingsworth's steamer Wyanoke, launched in 1870 and more than 1,000 tons lighter than a ship of the Pennsylvania class. In order to construct the four vessels, Cramp & Sons was forced to undertake a major revamping of its shipbuilding facilities.

The company began by purchasing real estate at Norris St., Philadelphia, a few blocks from its existing works, on which it built an entirely new shipyard, which was fitted with its own blacksmith, engine, boiler and carpentry shops in addition to a 700-foot outfitting wharf. Cramp also purchased new tools and production equipment. Cost of the real estate alone was above $265,000, and in order to limit the financial risk involved in the expansion, the firm made the decision to incorporate as the William Cramp & Sons Ship and Engine Building Company; however, it remained a proprietary business with the Cramp family owning all the shares.

Fortuitously, Cramp & Sons had built its first compound engine only the previous year, and Charles Cramp had also recently travelled to the United Kingdom to acquaint himself with the latest developments in engine technology, hiring a consultant engineer along the way. The company was thus in a position to fit engines of the latest design. Many parts for the ships however, such as iron plates, anchor chains, joinery for the first class cabins, gas fixtures etc., came from specialist Philadelphian manufacturers under subcontract.

Work on the ships remained on schedule until about February 1872, when progress began to be delayed by shortages of both craftsmen and materials. Cramp had expanded his company's workforce to over 1,000 to build the ships, but strong industry-wide demand at the time made it difficult to find skilled workers. The local ironmolding industry also had difficulty supplying the Cramp shipyard with the amount of iron plate it required.

== Launch ==
By August 1872 the first of the four ships, Pennsylvania was ready for launch. The event was considered of such patriotic and economic significance that a half day holiday was declared for the cities of Philadelphia and Camden and the surrounding area. The launch took place at 10:12 am on Thursday, August 15, watched by thousands of cheering spectators.

The second ship, Ohio, followed on October 30. On December 28, Philadelphia's Mayor William S. Stokley presented the American Line with four twelve pound Dahlgren howitzers intended for installation on the ships as signal guns—a gesture of civic pride in the achievement of building the four vessels. The last two ships of the class, Indiana and Illinois, were launched in March and June 1873.

== Description ==
When completed, each of the four Pennsylvania class ships was fitted with a 2,000 horsepower compound steam engine serviced by several large boilers, delivering power to a single propeller. Each vessel had a single large stack amidships and two schooner-rigged auxiliary masts, one fore and one aft, capable of utilizing a total of ten sails. The sails were only for use in case of mechanical breakdown.

An idea of the vessels' internal appointments may be drawn from descriptions of two of the individual ships of the class. Indiana's main saloon, finished in English walnut panelling, was 115 by 43 feet, and spanned the entire width of the ship. It featured a Waters piano at one end and a "finely covered bookcase" at the other. The ship featured the latest in accommodations, including bathrooms, a smoking room and a barbershop. Pennsylvania's cabins were equipped with hair mattresses and fine quality silk-striped terrycloth curtains. While the cabins were finished in a uniform style, each was decorated with a different fabric, lending them an attractive variety.

== Service history ==
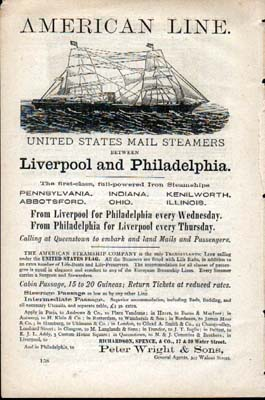
Early American Line advertisement featuring a Pennsylvania class vessel

When Pennsylvania set sail for Liverpool on her maiden voyage on May 22, 1873 on behalf of the American Line, she was the first ship owned by an American shipping line to participate in the transatlantic trade since the Civil War. Pennsylvania was soon joined by her three sister ships, and the four vessels would continue to ply the same Philadelphia-Queenstown-Liverpool route almost without change for many years.

=== Financial troubles ===
Unfortunately, the vessels' entry into service closely coincided with the panic of 1873, which triggered one of the longest economic recessions in U.S. history. By 1875, immigration to the United States had plunged to just 50% of its previous level, while overall trade declined 17%. Consequently, the four ships—the only ships fully owned by the American Steamship Company—steadily lost money.

A number of attempts were made to improve profitability—for example, in 1875 all four ships had their capacity for carrying first class passengers upgraded from 75 to 100, and in the same year an unsuccessful attempt to transport fruit was made. A more successful experiment was made in November of the same year when the Illinois sailed for Liverpool with 30 sides of dressed beef along with 140 sides of mutton and some poultry, which may have been the first successful shipment of fresh meat across the Atlantic. However, reliable shipments of fresh meat would not become possible until the invention of refrigeration some twenty years later.

A high point for the class came in 1876, when the Indiana had the honor of transporting President Ulysses S. Grant to Liverpool on the first leg of his highly successful world tour. By this time however the ASC's financial troubles were well known, and in 1878, the ships' original builder, William Cramp & Sons, offered to buy back three of the four Pennsylvania class ships in order to convert them into cruisers for the Russian Navy. The ASC refused the offer.

=== Transfer of management ===
A brief upturn in the U.S. economy between 1879 and 1881 assisted the ASC's profitability, but after the economy slumped again in 1882, ASC's parent company, the Pennsylvania Railroad, was no longer prepared to underwrite the losses. In October 1884, the Pennsylvania Railroad forced the sale of the ASC's four Pennsylvania class ships to its other shipping company, the International Navigation Company, and the American Steamship Company was disbanded. In the course of its ten-year history, the ASC had cost the PRR almost a million dollars, although the losses were offset to some extent by the extra business the Pennsylvania class ships had brought to the railroad. Around this time, each of the four ships also had their hulls strengthened at the cost of $25,000 per ship.

The main difference between the ASC and the INC was that the former had run American-built, American-flagged ships, while the latter employed foreign built vessels which sailed under the Belgian flag and operated under the name of the Red Star Line. This saved money because the Red Star Line employed European crews, who were paid less than their American counterparts. The INC, however, continued to run the Pennsylvania class on the Philadelphia-Queenstown-Liverpool route under the established American Line name.

=== Later service ===
A Red Star Line poster, probably dating from the 1890s

Between 1887 and 1891, all four ships of the class were refitted with smaller but more modern triple expansion steam engines, which were more economical to run and allowed for more cargo space. At the same time, all but Ohio were downgraded to carry only cabin- and steerage-class passengers. During the 1890s, the vessels operated a variety of different routes, sometimes under charter to the Red Star Line, including Antwerp–New York and Antwerp-Philadelphia, as well as their original Liverpool to Philadelphia route.

In 1897, Clement Acton Griscom, head of the Inman Line which now controlled the vessels, took advantage of high demand for American flag vessels caused by the Alaskan gold rush to sell off his ageing fleet of Pennsylvania class vessels. Pennsylvania, Ohio and Indiana were all sold to Pacific steamship companies servicing gold rush customers, while the fourth ship, Illinois was sold to the U.S. Navy to serve as a supply ship. All four ships continued to serve in these respective roles for at least another dozen years.

Pennsylvania, Ohio and Indiana all eventually succumbed to accidents in Pacific waters. Illinois, as USS Supply, served in both the Spanish–American War and the First World War, and continued in U.S. Navy service until being struck from the Navy List in 1921. She was finally scrapped in 1928. In total, the four ships of the Pennsylvania class gave a total of well over 160 years of service to their various owners.
