= SS Illinois (1873) =

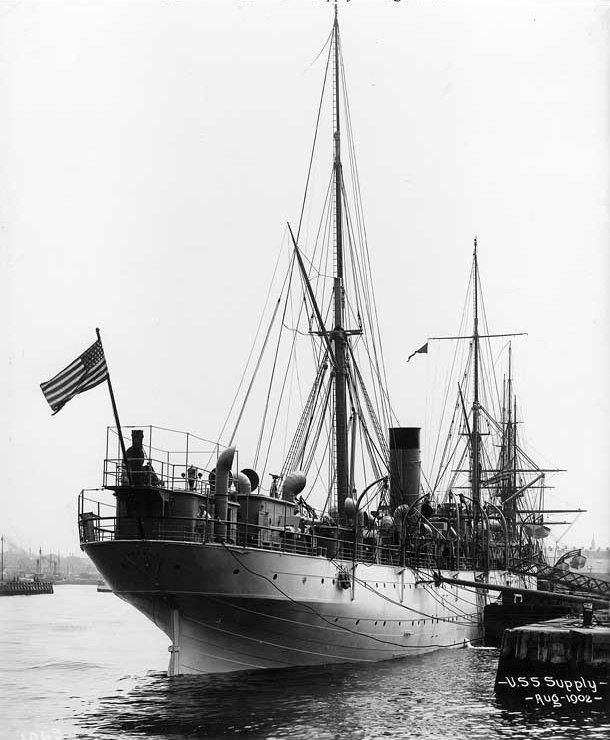
- Stern view of USS Supply (formerly the SS Illinois), probably taken just after the ship's recommission in August 1902.

History

United States
- Name: SS Illinois
- Namesake: Illinois, USA
- Owner: American Line
- Operator: American Steamship Company
- Port of registry: United States
- Builder: William Cramp & Sons, Philadelphia
- Cost: $520,000
- Yard number: 183
- Launched: June 1873
- Maiden voyage: January 23, 1874
- Refit: 1891
- Fate: Scrapped, 1928

General characteristics
- Class & type: Pennsylvania class passenger-cargo ship
- Tonnage: 3,104 gross
- Length: 343 ft
- Beam: 43 ft
- Depth of hold: 32 ft 2 in
- Propulsion: Compound (later triple expansion) steam engine, single screw, auxiliary sails
- Speed: 11.5 knots
- Capacity: 46 × 1st-, 132 2nd class and 789 steerage passengers

SS Illinois was an iron passenger-cargo steamship built by William Cramp & Sons in 1873. The last of a series of four Pennsylvania-class vessels, Illinois and her three sister ships—Pennsylvania, Ohio and Indiana—were the largest iron ships ever built in the United States at the time of their construction, and amongst the first to be fitted with compound steam engines. They were also the first ships to challenge British dominance of the transatlantic trade since the American Civil War.

Though soon outclassed by newer and larger vessels, Illinois was destined to enjoy a long and distinguished career, first as a transatlantic passenger liner and later as the U.S. Navy's auxiliary vessel USS Supply. In the 1870s, Illinois may have been the first ship to successfully transport a shipment of fresh meat from the United States to Europe, twenty years before the introduction of refrigeration. As USS Supply, the ship served in both the Spanish–American War and the First World War, and crew members may have been the first United States personnel to fire a hostile shot in the latter. Illinois was scrapped in 1928.

== Development ==
The four Pennsylvania class liners were constructed at a cost of $520,000 each by William Cramp & Sons on behalf of the American Steamship Company (ASC), a subsidiary of the Pennsylvania Railroad Company. The Railroad intended to utilize the vessels to bring European immigrants direct to Philadelphia, thus ensuring the company a steady stream of customers. In recognition of this purpose, the four ships—Pennsylvania, Indiana, Illinois and Ohio—were named after the four states serviced by the Railroad. Design of the ships was entrusted to Charles H. Cramp of the Cramp & Sons shipyard, and Barnabas H. Bartol, a director of the ASC.

== Construction ==
At 3,000 gross tons apiece, the ships were 1,000 tons larger than any iron ship previously constructed in the United States, and Cramp & Sons was forced to undertake a substantial upgrade of its facilities to complete them. The company established an entirely new shipyard for construction of the vessels, serviced by its own blacksmith, engine, boiler and carpentry shops, as well as providing it with a 700-foot outfitting wharf. Cost of the real estate alone was in excess of $265,000, and Cramp & Sons was obliged to incorporate as the William Cramp & Sons Engine and Ship Building Company in order to limit the financial risk involved. Fortuitously, Cramp & Sons had only recently built its first compound marine steam engine, and consequently the shipyard was able to install the vessels with the latest in engine technology.

The original contract called for Pennsylvania to be completed by January 1, 1873, but the schedule proved optimistic. A short-lived shipbuilding boom in the early 1870s made it difficult for the Cramp shipyard to obtain iron plates and other materials, and the yard was also affected by shortages of skilled labor. As a result, the ship would not be ready for delivery until almost a year later.

== Service history ==
Illinois was launched in June 1873. She commenced her maiden voyage on January 23, 1874 on the Philadelphia–Queenstown–Liverpool route, a route she would maintain for the next twelve years.

=== 1870s ===
Like her sister ships Pennsylvania and Ohio, Illinois also had an eventful first year of operation. In April 1874, she was making her way down the Delaware River when, just opposite the Philadelphia Naval Yard, she encountered four canal boats coming in the opposite direction. Illinois promptly collided with and sank all four vessels in short order. Fortunately, there were no deaths, and the hull of Illinois was undamaged by the collisions, enabling her to continue the voyage to Liverpool.

After the wooden bridge of Illinois' sister ship Pennsylvania was destroyed in an 1874 hurricane, a new iron bridge was installed on all four of the Pennsylvania class vessels. In 1875, a decision was made to increase the first class complement of all Pennsylvania class vessels from 75 to 100.

=== Experimental meat shipments ===
With the American Line struggling to turn a profit in the wake of the 1873 financial panic, the company decided to experiment with some novel exports. A glut of peaches in the summer of 1875 encouraged the company to try and export some of the surplus fruit to Great Britain on the Ohio, but the experiment was a costly failure.

Undeterred, the company next tried a shipment of fresh meat. Illinois was loaded with 30 head of dressed beef, 140 sheep carcasses and some poultry and oysters for a November 1875 voyage. A high pressure engine was installed to circulate a current of cold air chilled by eight tons of ice. This time the ice lasted through the voyage, and the meat arrived in Liverpool in excellent condition, encouraging the client, Martin, Fuller & Company, to make a second shipment of 100 head of dressed beef. These may have been the first ever successful shipments of fresh meat from the United States to Europe, but another twenty years would pass before the invention of refrigeration made regular, reliable shipments possible.

=== 1880s–1897 ===
In 1882, the wooden pilothouse in the bow of all four Pennsylvania class ships was replaced with an iron one for safety reasons.

In 1883–84, inspections revealed that all four Pennsylvania class ships required immediate maintenance to their hulls, which needed strengthening. The repairs were carried out at a cost of $25,000 per vessel, but the additional costs probably contributed to the Pennsylvania Railroad's decision to wind up the American Steamship Company, which because of the after effects of the 1873 panic had always struggled to make a profit. With the demise of the ASC, Illinois and her three sister ships were transferred to management of the PRR's other shipping line, the Red Star Line, but Illinois continued to service her familiar Liverpool–Philadelphia route until 1886. Her last such voyage commenced July 7 of that year. On December 17, she began the first of twenty crossings on the Antwerp–New York route.

Illinois had a major refit in 1891 with the installation of a triple-expansion steam engine to replace her original compound steam engine. The new engine, manufactured and installed by the ship's original builder, William Cramp & Sons, was smaller, allowing for more cargo space, and more economical to run. At this time the first class accommodation of Illinois was removed, and she was fitted to accommodate intermediate "cabin class" and steerage passengers only.

Illinois commenced her final Antwerp–New York crossing on February 27, 1892. Subsequently she worked the Antwerp-Philadelphia route until 1897.

=== USS Supply ===
In March 1898, Illinois sailed from Philadelphia to San Francisco. On April 30, 1898, she was sold for the sum of $325,000 to the United States Navy, for employment in the recently declared Spanish–American War.

Renamed USS Supply, the vessel served as the supply ship for the American fleet in Cuban waters. After the war ended in late 1898, Supply was decommissioned, refitted to improve her living quarters, and recommissioned on August 1, 1902. She subsequently operated as the supply ship for the Asiatic Fleet and as Station Ship at Guam for many years.

When the United States entered the First World War on April 6, 1917, USS Supply was in port at Guam together with the German auxiliary cruiser SMS Cormoran, which had been interned there since 1914. A party from Supply attempted to seize the German vessel, but Cormoran's captain had prepared for such a possibility and scuttled the ship. A warning shot fired over the bow of Cormoran by crewmen of Supply during the attempted seizure may have been the first hostile shot fired by American servicemen in World War I.

Supply was placed out of commission at Mare Island on 15 September 1919. She was struck from the Navy List and sold for scrap on 30 September 1921. The ship was eventually scrapped in 1928.
