= USS Supply (1872) =

American supply ship

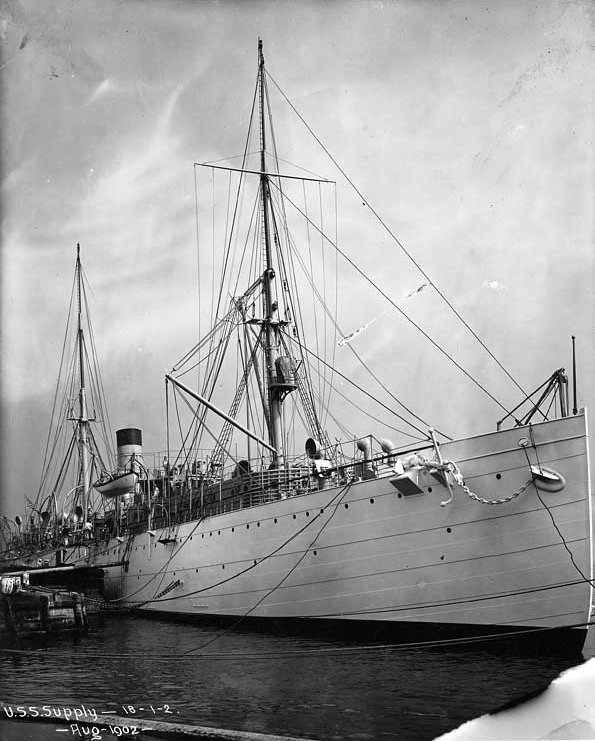
- USS Supply (formerly SS Illinois) in dock, probably taken just after the ship's recommission in August 1902.

History

United States
- Name: USS Supply
- Builder: William Cramp & Sons, Philadelphia
- Cost: $520,000
- Yard number: 183
- Launched: 15 August 1872
- Maiden voyage: 23 January 1874
- Refit: 1891
- Fate: Scrapped, 1928

General characteristics
- Type: Auxiliary ship
- Tonnage: 3,104 GRT
- Displacement: 4,325
- Length: 355 ft 8 in (108.4 m)
- Beam: 43 ft 4 in (13.2 m)
- Draft: 19 ft 5 in (5.9 m)
- Depth of hold: 32 ft 2 in (9.8 m)
- Propulsion: Triple expansion steam engine, single screw, auxiliary sails
- Sail plan: Schooner-rigged
- Speed: 9.5 knots (17.6 km/h; 10.9 mph)
- Complement: 128
- Armament: 6 × 6-pdr. R.F.; 4 × 1-pdr. E.F.

USS Supply, ex-Illinois, was a schooner-rigged iron steamer built in 1873 by William Cramp & Sons of Philadelphia. Illinois was purchased by the Navy Department from the International Navigation Company on 30 April 1898 for $325,000.00 and commissioned as Supply, Lt. Comdr. R. R. Ingersoll in command.

== Service history ==
=== Spanish–American War ===
Supply was used as the supply ship for the fleet in Cuban waters during the Spanish–American War. The ship was decommissioned at the New York Navy Yard on 28 April 1899. She was refitted after the war, with better living quarters, and recommissioned on 1 August 1902.

=== Peacetime service ===
After recommissioning, Supply was ordered to duty on the Asiatic Station. She operated as the supply ship for the Asiatic Fleet and as Station Ship at Guam for many years. In 1904, she transported Governor of Guam William Elbridge Sewell back to the United States when he fell deathly ill. The ship was overhauled at the Puget Sound Navy Yard in July 1912 and again from November 1915 to March 1916.

Supply put to sea on 19 March 1916 and after embarking passengers at San Francisco for passage to Guam and sailed on 29 March. She called at Honolulu, Territory of Hawaii, in early April and arrived at Apra Harbor on 25 April. This was her home port while serving as a stores ship for the Asiatic Station. From 22 October to 7 December 1916, she cruised to the Philippine Islands, China, and Japan. In January 1917 the ship was overhauled at Olongapo, Philippines, and returned to Guam on 27 March.

=== First World War ===
The German auxiliary cruiser SMS Cormoran had been in Asiatic waters at the outbreak of World War I and later operated in the southern Pacific. However, lack of provisions forced Cormoran to put in at Guam on 14 December 1914. The German captain accepted internment of the ship the following day, and the cruiser remained in that status until the United States declared war on Germany in April 1917.

The morning of 6 April, Supply put a prize crew of 32 men afloat to board the German ship. Her captain offered to surrender the men but not the cruiser. At 0803, Cormoran was blown up by her own crew. Supply immediately lowered all boats to aid in recovering Cormoran's crew and their personal effects from the water.

Supply remained on station in Apra Harbor until steaming for Manila on 21 May 1917. She departed there on 6 June en route to Japan, via Guam. After visiting various Japanese ports, the ship returned to Cavite, Philippines, for drydocking and repairs. Upon completion, she returned to Guam on 29 August and resumed her duties until 28 November when she got underway for the United States. Christmas 1917 was celebrated at Pearl Harbor; the Panama Canal was transited on 19 January 1918; and Supply arrived at the Charleston Navy Yard on the 25th.

=== Decommissioning ===
Upon completion of repairs, Supply was designated flagship of the Train, Atlantic Fleet, based at Charleston. On 29 May 1919, she was reassigned to Guam for duty as Station Ship. However, upon her arrival on the west coast, she was ordered to Mare Island for repairs and placed out of commission there on 15 September 1919. Supply was struck from the Navy list and sold for scrap on 30 September 1921. She was scrapped in 1928.
