= SS Pennsylvania (1872) =

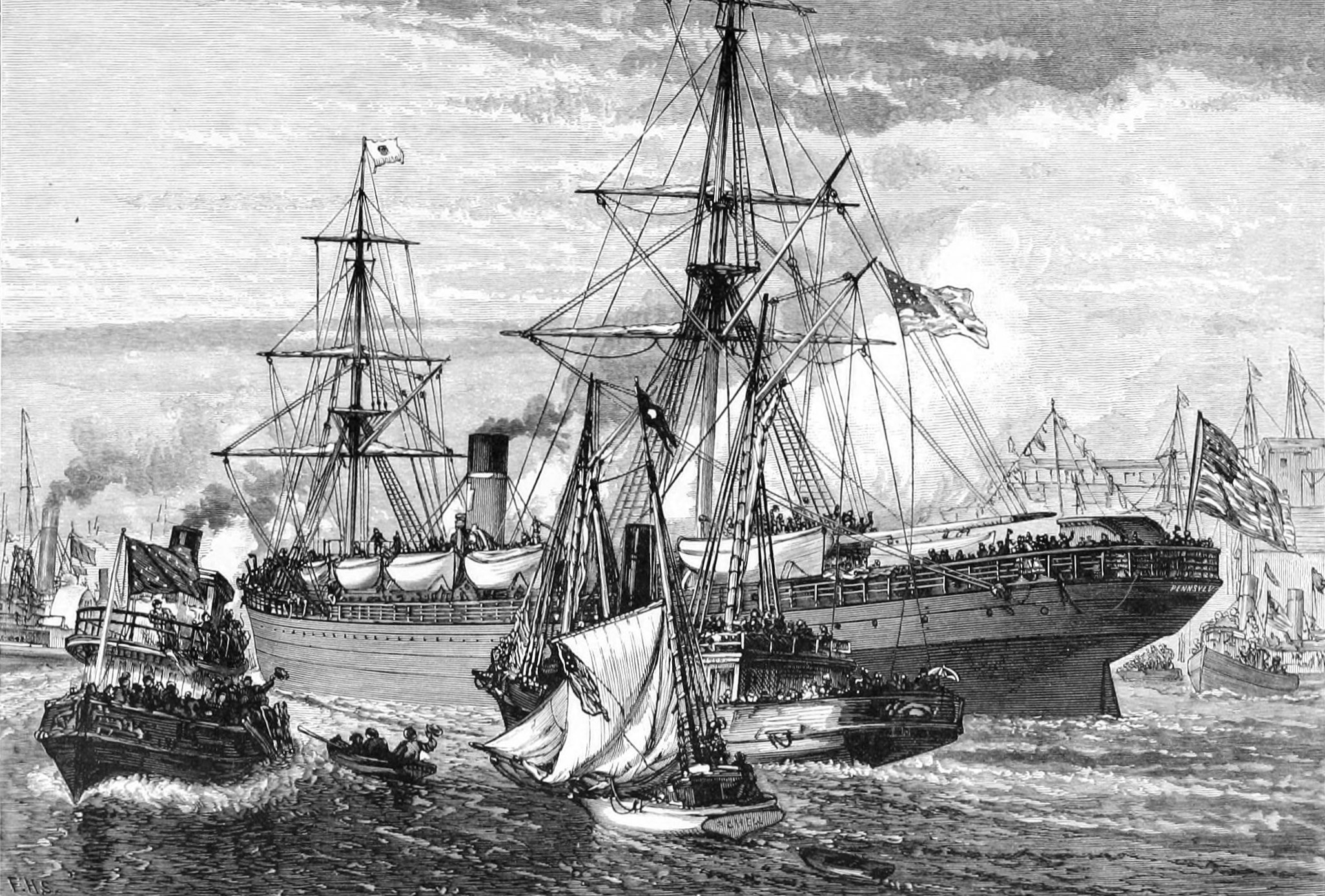
- SS Pennsylvania embarking on her trial trip, May 5, 1873

History

United States
- Name: SS Pennsylvania
- Namesake: Pennsylvania, USA
- Owner: American Line
- Operator: American Steamship Company
- Port of registry: United States
- Builder: William Cramp & Sons, Philadelphia
- Cost: $520,000
- Yard number: 180
- Launched: August 15, 1872
- Maiden voyage: January 23, 1874
- Refit: 1891
- Fate: Destroyed by fire at Iquique, Chile, November 12, 1918

General characteristics
- Class & type: Pennsylvania class passenger-cargo ship
- Tonnage: 3,104 gross
- Length: 343–355 ft
- Beam: 43 ft
- Depth of hold: 32 ft 2 in
- Propulsion: Compound (later triple expansion) steam engine, single screw, auxiliary sails
- Speed: 11.5 knots
- Capacity: 46 x 1st-, 132 2nd class and 789 steerage passengers

SS Pennsylvania was an iron passenger-cargo steamship built by William Cramp & Sons in 1872. The first of a series of four Pennsylvania-class vessels and the lead ship in her class, Pennsylvania and her three sister ships—Ohio, Indiana and Illinois—were the largest iron ships ever built in the United States at the time of their construction, and amongst the first to be fitted with compound steam engines. They were also the first ships to challenge British dominance of the transatlantic trade since the American Civil War.

Launched with great fanfare in 1872, Pennsylvania narrowly escaped destruction by hurricane in her first year of operation, but went on to enjoy a long and distinguished career. Though soon outclassed by newer ships, she continued in operation for some 44 years, plying various transatlantic routes and later playing a role in the Alaskan gold rush and serving as a troopship during the Spanish–American War. The ship was finally destroyed by a fire in 1918.

== Development ==
The four Pennsylvania class liners were constructed at a cost of $520,000 each by William Cramp & Sons on behalf of the American Steamship Company (ASC), a subsidiary of the Pennsylvania Railroad Company. The Railroad intended to utilize the vessels to bring European immigrants direct to Philadelphia, thus ensuring the company a steady stream of customers. In recognition of this purpose, the four ships—Pennsylvania, Indiana, Illinois and Ohio—were named after the four states serviced by the Railroad. Design of the ships was entrusted to Charles H. Cramp of the Cramp & Sons shipyard, and Barnabas H. Bartol, a director of the ASC.

== Construction ==
At 3,000 gross tons apiece, the ships were 1,000 tons larger than any iron ship previously constructed in the United States, and Cramp & Sons was forced to undertake a substantial upgrade of its facilities to complete them. The company established an entirely new shipyard for construction of the vessels, serviced by its own blacksmith, engine, boiler and carpentry shops, as well as providing it with a 700-foot outfitting wharf. Cost of the real estate alone was in excess of $265,000, and Cramp & Sons was obliged to incorporate as the William Cramp & Sons Engine and Ship Building Company in order to limit the financial risk involved. Fortuitously, Cramp & Sons had only recently built its first compound marine steam engine, and consequently the shipyard was able to install the vessels with the latest in engine technology.

The original contract called for Pennsylvania to be completed by September 1, 1872, but the schedule proved optimistic. A short-lived shipbuilding boom in the early 1870s made it difficult for the Cramp shipyard to obtain iron plates and other materials, and the yard was also affected by shortages of skilled labor. As a result, the ship would not be ready for delivery until almost nine months later.

== Launch ==
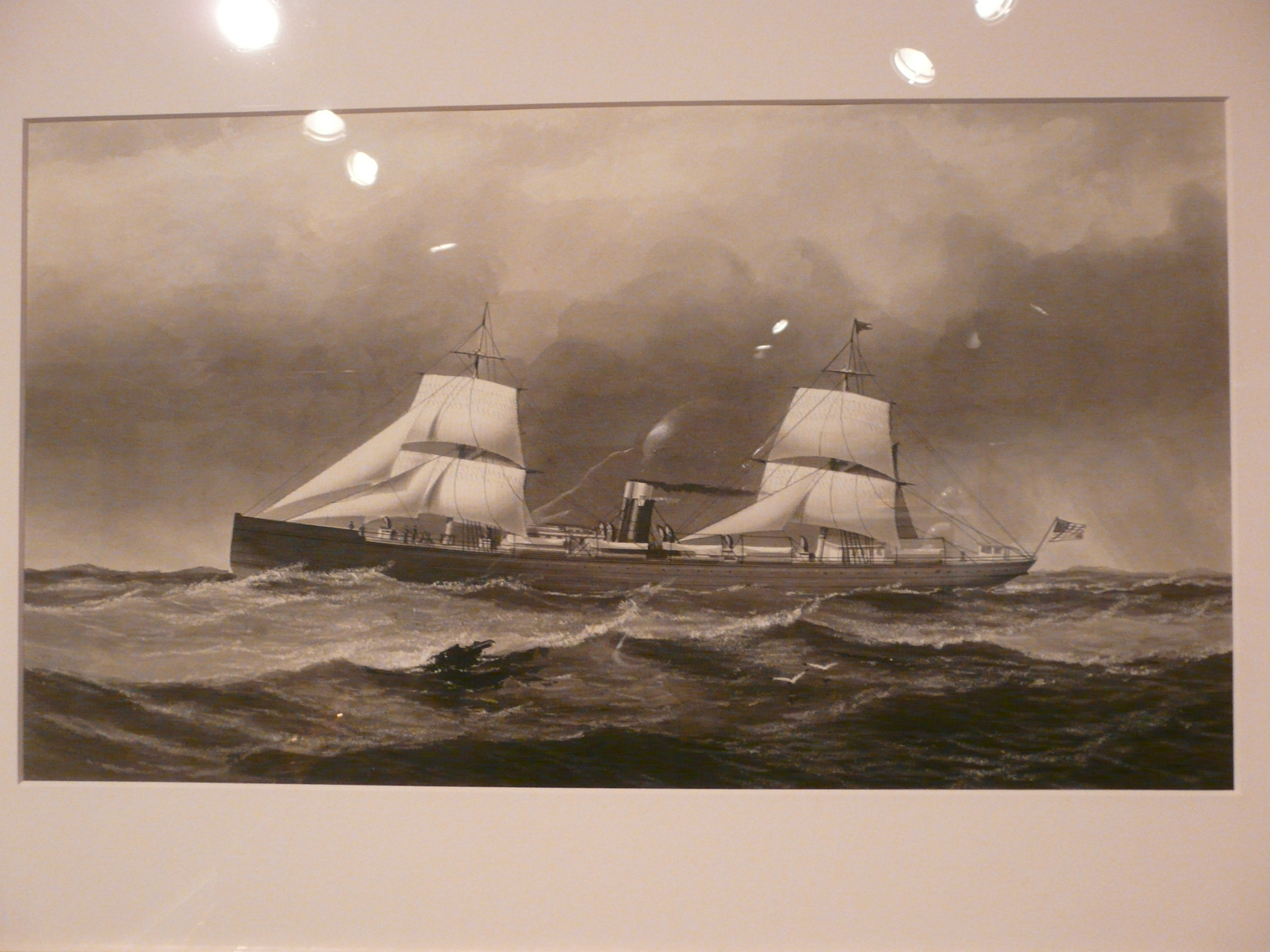
Steamship Pennsylvania. 19th-century painting.

Pennsylvania was launched on August 15, 1872. The event was considered of such significance that—in an era of the 12-hour day and six-day working week—a half day holiday was declared for the entire city of Philadelphia and the surrounding area. Piers, buildings and ships, including Pennsylvania herself, were decorated with patriotic bunting and flags of every description, and a vast crowd of sightseers thronged every available vantage point along the river, while others watched from the hundreds of boats large and small, many of which had been rented out as excursion vessels for the occasion. At 10:12 am, William Cramp gave the order to cut the stays, and Pennsylvania slid down the ways and into the Delaware River to "the cheers of a vast throng, the blowing of a hundred steam whistles, and a salvo of artillery."

It would be many more months, however, before the ship was ready for service. Difficulties in obtaining castings for the engines added to the existing delays, and consequently the ship's trials were not held until the week of May 3, 1873. After a 48-hour speed-and-economy trial of the ship's engines along the Delaware River, Pennsylvania's performance was declared satisfactory, and she was handed over to her new owners.

== Service history ==
Pennsylvania departed Philadelphia on her maiden voyage on May 22, 1873, commanded by Captain George Sumner and with a complement of 56 first-class passengers, including Major Thomas T. Firth, a leading executive of the Pennsylvania Railroad Company, and his wife. The voyage proved not without incident as the ship shed propeller blades during the transatlantic crossing, and she arrived at Liverpool under sail, after which she spent some time in drydock undergoing repairs. By June 23 she was ready to make the return voyage, with a full complement of passengers and a substantial cargo. Pennsylvania thereafter would continue to make regular crossings between Philadelphia and Liverpool for the next thirteen years.

=== 1874 hurricane ===
Although destined for many years of reliable service, Pennsylvania's career was almost prematurely ended only a few months after launch. The winter of 1873–74 was a particularly bad one on the Atlantic, and would prove a traumatic one for the crew and passengers of Pennsylvania.

Pennsylvania departed Liverpool for Philadelphia at 2:30pm February 21, 1874, with a typical small winter-passage complement of two saloon and twelve steerage-class passengers, and some $250,000 of cargo. On the night of February 27, the ship ran into a hurricane on the open sea. Giant waves swept everything from the ship's decks and flooded the passenger saloon, while the ship struggled to retain headway. At around midnight, a mammoth wave slammed down upon the vessel, sweeping away all the lifeboats and liferafts, and breaking the foreboom and all four of the ship's forward hatches. Water began pouring into the holds, until they were about one quarter full. Tragically, the huge wave had also swept away the wheelhouse, the mate's house, and part of the wooden ship's bridge, taking with them the captain of the ship and four crew members, none of whom were ever seen again.

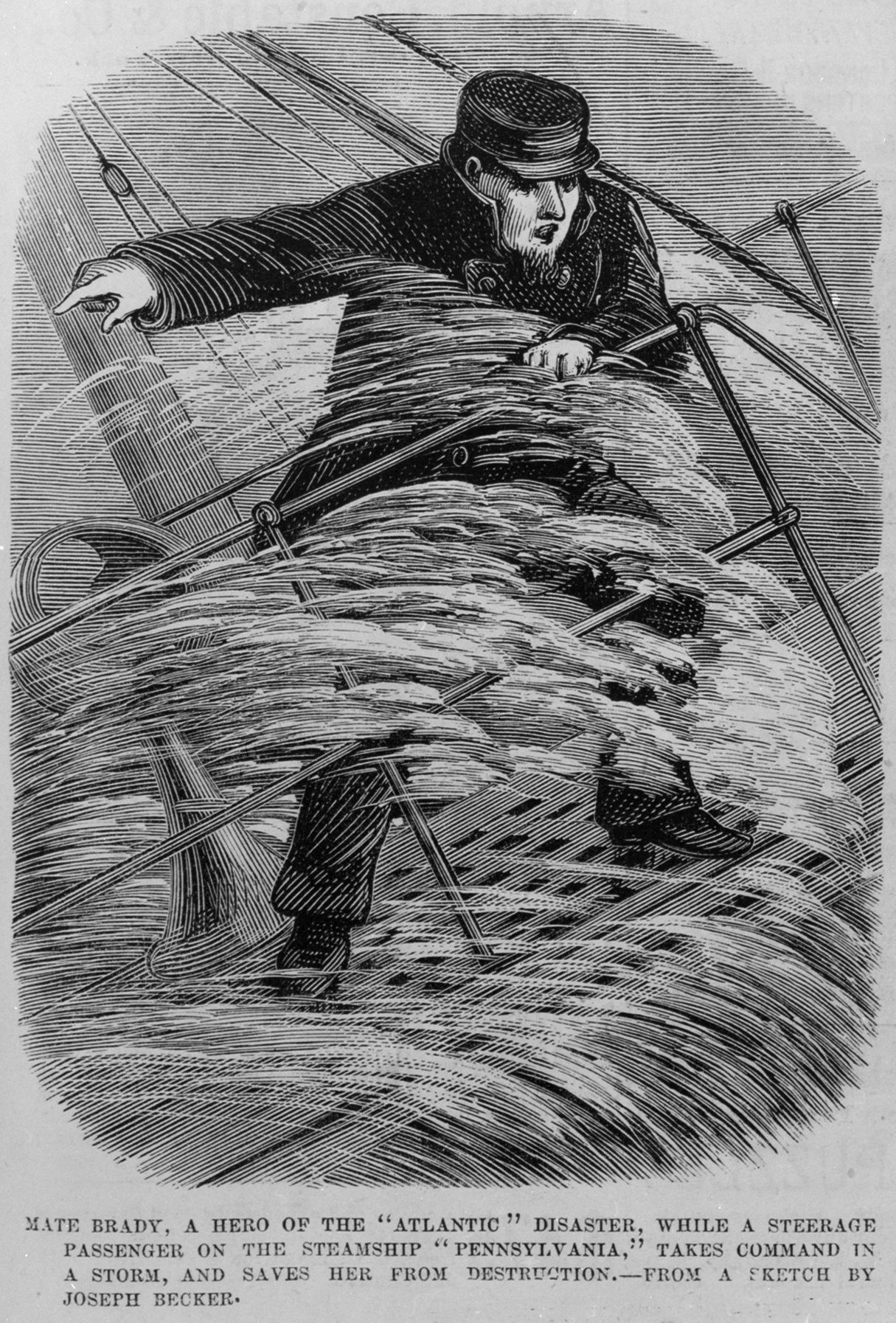
Cornelius L. Brady

Command of the ship thereby devolved upon the ship's third officer, Charles Rivers, but Rivers, apparently in a state of shock, proved incapable of action. Fortunately, one of the ship's small complement of passengers, Cornelius L. Brady, was a ships' master himself with recent experience of such a crisis. Brady had been the hero in the shipwreck of the SS Atlantic less than a year prior, where his courageous action in personally establishing a rope to shore was credited with saving as many as 250 lives. Now he was about to lead another rescue effort. Brady quickly ordered the crew to secure the damaged upper forward hatches with hatches from the lower deck, in order to stop the further flow of water into the ship. A delegation of the crew then implored Brady to take command, a proposal which he accepted. Brady made his way ondeck to the midships wheelhouse, where he ordered the helmsman to turn the ship into the wind. He then rang the engine room to reduce the ship's speed to dead slow.

The ship was to survive another five days of battering from high seas until February 28, when the storm finally broke, after which Brady brought the ship home safely to Philadelphia, albeit a week late. The drama was not quite over however. Having just saved a $600,000 ship and its $250,000 cargo along with the passengers and crew from destruction, Brady felt insulted by a gift of just $1,000 offered by the American Steamship Company. He promptly sued for the full salvage value of the vessel, and in the subsequent court case, in which one witness after another testified in his favour, Brady was eventually awarded the sum of $4,000 plus $200 expenses, which after legal fees netted him the significantly improved sum of $2,550.

As a result of the destruction of the ship's wooden bridge during the hurricane, a new iron bridge was later installed on all four of the Pennsylvania class vessels.

=== 1875–1880s ===
After this initial brush with destruction, Pennsylvania continued to provide regular service between Liverpool and Philadelphia for another thirteen years. In 1875, a decision was made to increase the first class complement of all Pennsylvania class vessels from 75 to 100. In 1878, Pennsylvania was involved in a collision with the schooner H. B. Hume in which the latter was sunk. Judgement in the case was rendered against Pennsylvania in 1882. On 3 March 1880, Pennsylvania ran aground on the Pluckington Bank, in Liverpool Bay whilst outward bay from Liverpool to Philadelphia. She was refloated with the assistance of a tug and resumed her voyage. In 1882, the wooden pilothouse in the bow of all four Pennsylvania class ships was replaced with an iron one for safety reasons.

In 1883–84, inspections revealed that all four Pennsylvania class ships required immediate maintenance to their hulls, which needed strengthening. The repairs were carried out at a cost of $25,000 per vessel, but the additional costs probably contributed to the Pennsylvania Railroad's decision to wind up the American Steamship Company, whose inception had coincided with the extended economic downturn beginning with the financial crisis of 1873, as a result of which the company had constantly struggled to turn a profit. With the demise of the ASC, Pennsylvania and her three sister ships were sold to the PRR's other shipping line, the International Navigation Company, which owned the Red Star Line. Unlike the ASC, the Red Star Line did not exclusively employ American crews, resulting in a net saving on wages, but the transfer meant an end to the ASC's original vision of a class of "American iron steamship[s], built of American materials, owned by American capital, and ... manned by American seamen."

In 1887, Pennsylvania was finally transferred from the Liverpool–Philadelphia route, which she had maintained from her first voyage, to the Red Star Line's premier Antwerp-New York route. By this time, the Red Star Line had also acquired the prestigious Inman Steamship Company, and Pennsylvania reportedly sailed for the first time with the Inman Line in 1888, adopting the company's colours in 1893.

=== 1890s–1918 ===
In 1891, Pennsylvania had a major overhaul when her outdated compound engine was replaced by a new triple-expansion engine supplied by the original builder, William Cramp & Sons. The new engine was smaller, allowing for more cargo space, and was more economical to run. By this time, the ship was beginning to show her age in comparison with newer and more modern vessels, and she no longer carried first class passengers. In the same year, the ship was switched to the less important Antwerp-Philadelphia route, which she maintained until 1898, making her last transatlantic crossing that year.

In the late 1890s, the Alaskan gold rush created a demand for American-flagged ships. The American Line took advantage of this demand to sell three of the ageing Pennsylvania class vessels, including Pennsylvania, at a premium. On April 11, 1898, Pennsylvania sailed from Philadelphia to San Francisco on the Pacific Ocean, where she was sold to the Empire Line for service on the Seattle-Nome route. Shortly thereafter, she was requisitioned by the U.S. Navy to serve as a troopship during the Spanish–American War.

Pennsylvania's 44-year career eventually came to an end when she was destroyed by fire in Iquique, Chile, on November 12, 1918, the day after Armistice Day.
