= American Line =

American transport company

- House flag
- Industry: Shipping
- Founded: 1871; 155 years ago in Philadelphia, Pennsylvania, United States
- Defunct: 1932
- Fate: Absorbed into United States Lines
- Headquarters: Philadelphia

The American Line was a shipping company that operated independently from 1871 until 1932, when it was absorbed into the United States Lines.

The Philadelphia, Pennsylvania-based company was the largest American shipping company during its existence, rivaled only by Baltimore-based Atlantic Transport Lines, although all American oceanic shipping concerns were dwarfed by British companies such as the White Star Line and Cunard Line and German ones such as HAPAG.

== History ==
The American Line began as part of the Pennsylvania Railroad, although the railroad got out of the shipping business soon afterward. Its first president was Herman Joseph Lombaert (1816–1885), a PRR vice-president who resigned from the railroad when the shipping company became independent.

The company's most prominent president was Clement Griscom, who led the company from 1888 to 1902 and worked as a company executive for its entire existence. The company became much larger when it bought out the Inman Line in 1886.

In 1902, Griscom decided to merge his company with several other lines to become the International Navigation Co., soon renamed the International Mercantile Marine Company. In the IMM, the American Line generally handled traffic between the United States ports of Philadelphia and New York City and the British ports of Liverpool and Southampton. Sister company Red Star Line handled traffic between America and the European continent, primarily through Antwerp, Belgium.

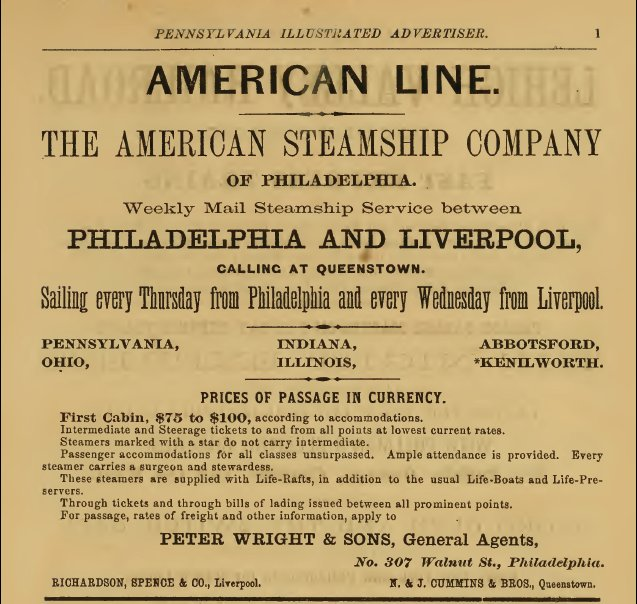
American Line 1870s advertisement

When the IMM trust failed in 1932, the American pieces of the combine were once again solely under the American flag, this time in the guise of United States Lines.

== Ships ==
- City of Berlin, chartered to the Red Star Line 1895–1898 for seven voyages
- City of New York
- City of Paris (also sailed as USS Yale, SS Philadelphia, and USS Harrisburg)
- Haverford, chartered to the Red Star Line 1901–1902 for four voyages
- Merion, Haverford's sister ship, torpedoed and sunk in 1915 while acting as a decoy "battlecruiser"
- Illinois, chartered to the Red Star Line 1886–1897
- Indiana, chartered to the Red Star Line 1889
- Kensington, chartered to the Red Star Line 1895–1903
- Kroonland, purchased from the Red Star Line in 1923, then sold to Panama Pacific Line
- Pennsylvania, chartered from American Line 1887–1897
- Pittsburgh, chartered to the Red Star Line 1925–1926. Sold to the RSL 1926 and renamed Pennland, sold to Bernstein Red Star Line, Hamburg 1935
- St. Louis
- St. Paul
- Southwark, chartered to the Red Star Line 1895–1903

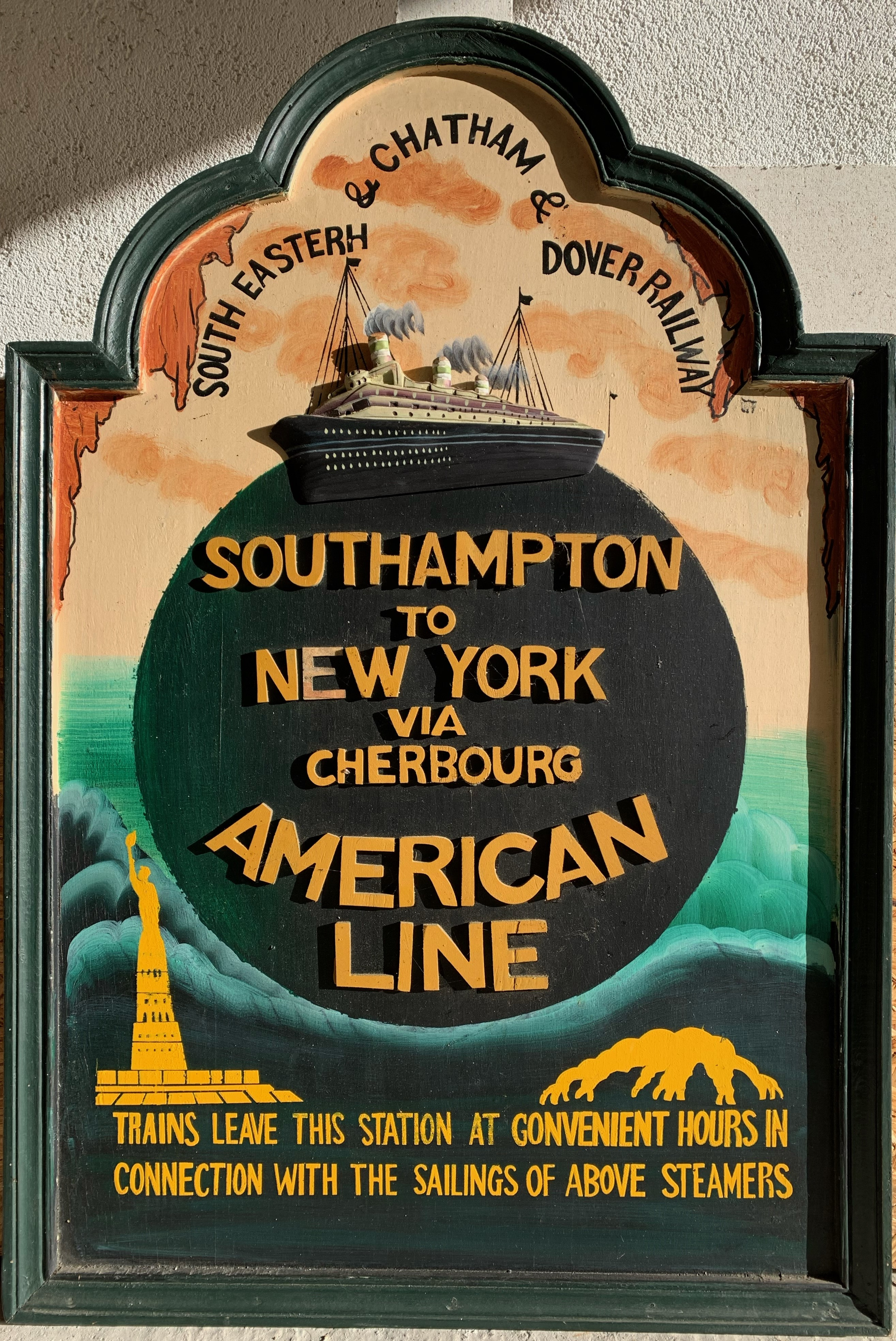
American Line advertisement unknown year
