= SS Laurentic =

A number of steamships have been named SS Laurentic after Laurentia:

- SS Laurentic (1908), a 14,892-ton liner of the White Star Line, sunk January 25, 1917 off Lough Swilly (354 casualties)
- SS Laurentic (1927), an 18,724-ton liner of the White Star Line, sunk November 3, 1940 off Gweedore (49 casualties)
