= SS Laurentic (1927) =

Steam ocean liner

Coordinates: 54°9′N 13°44′W

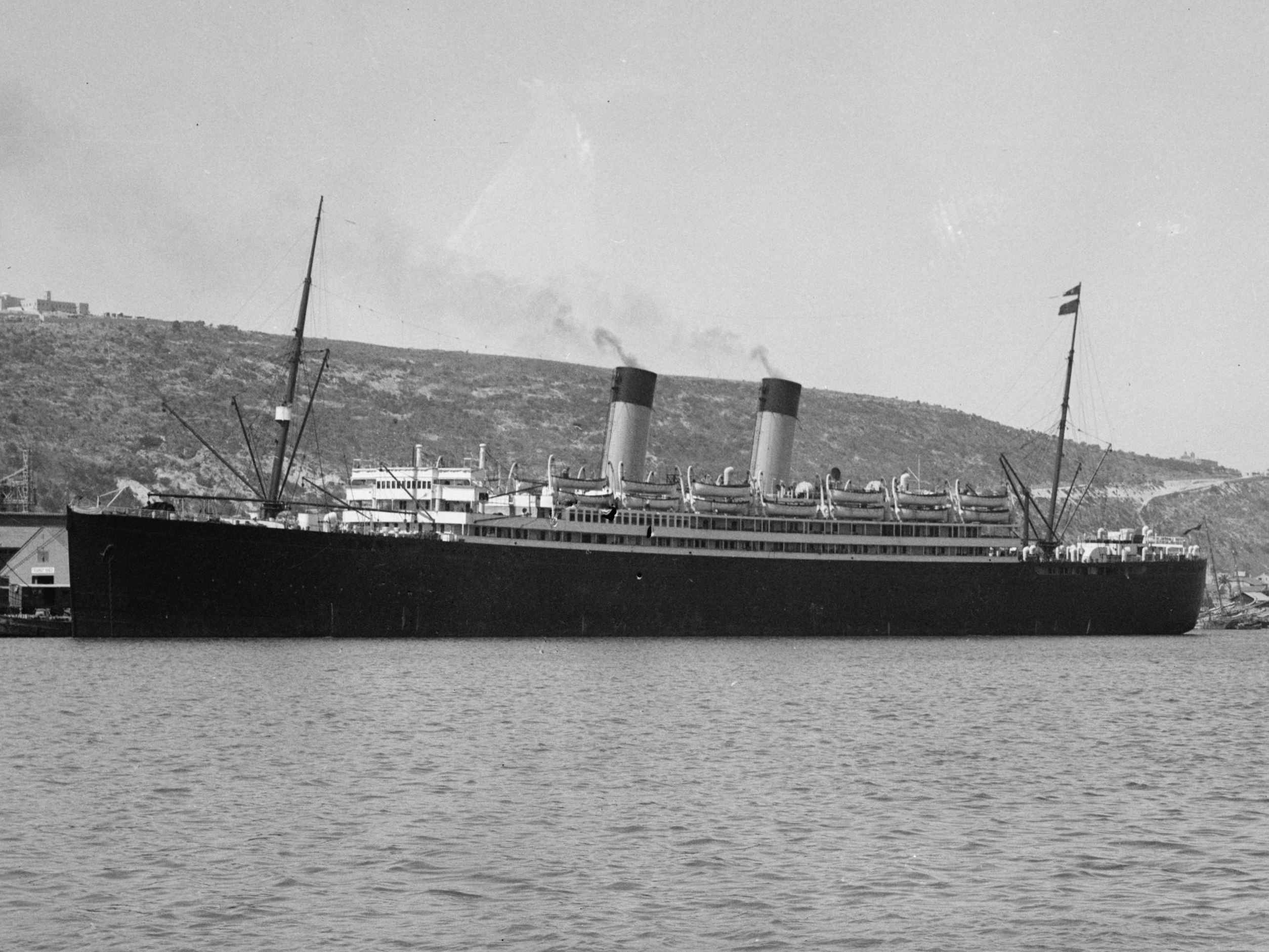
- Laurentic in 1936

History

United Kingdom
- Name: Laurentic
- Owner: Oceanic Steam Nav Co (1927–34); Cunard-White Star Line (1934–40)
- Operator: White Star Line 1927–34; Cunard-White Star Line 1934–39; (United Kingdom) Royal Navy 1939–40 (pennant F51)
- Port of registry: (United Kingdom) Liverpool
- Route: Liverpool – Québec – Montreal
- Builder: Harland and Wolff, Belfast
- Yard number: 470
- Launched: 16 June 1927
- Completed: 1 November 1927
- Maiden voyage: 12 November 1927
- In service: 1927
- Out of service: 1940
- Identification: UK official number 149642; code letters KWPV (until 1933); call sign GNJT (1934 onward)
- Fate: Torpedoed and sunk, 3–4 November 1940
- Notes: The last steamship built for White Star Line and the last White Star Line ship to sink.

General characteristics
- Type: Ocean liner
- Tonnage: 18,724 GRT; 11,103 NRT
- Length: 578.2 ft (176.2 m)
- Beam: 75.4 ft (23.0 m)
- Depth: 40.6 ft (12.4 m)
- Decks: 4 decks
- Propulsion: 2 × 4-cylinder triple-expansion engines; 1 × low-pressure steam turbine; 3 × screws
- Speed: 16.5 knots (30.6 km/h)
- Capacity: 594 Cabin Class; 406 Tourist Class; 500 Third Class
- Sensors & processing systems: submarine signalling; wireless direction finding (by 1930)
- Armament: as armed merchant cruiser: BL 6-inch Mk XII naval guns; QF 3-inch 20 cwt anti-aircraft guns

SS Laurentic was a 18,724 GRT steam ocean liner built in 1927 by Harland and Wolff, Belfast, for White Star Line. The second ship of the company to bear this name, she was the last steamship to be built for the company.

She sailed between Liverpool and Canada from 1927 to 1936. After the merger of the White Star Line with Cunard Line, she was used mainly as a cruise ship. From December 1935 to 1939, she was laid up in Liverpool.

In 1939, the Admiralty requisitioned her and had her converted into an armed merchant cruiser for the Royal Navy. On 3–4 November 1940, a U-boat torpedoed her off the west coast of Ireland when she was on a rescue mission for another ship that had been torpedoed. She sank with the loss of 49 of her complement.

== Building ==
In the 1920s, the White Star Line experienced a difficult period. It was still part of the International Mercantile Marine Company (IMM), an American trust of shipping companies, but the management of this group increasingly considered getting rid of its non-US subsidiaries. It was in this uncertain context that Laurentic, the second ship of this name, was ordered. The building of the ship is unusual in several respects. It was the only time in 60 years that White Star Line ordered a ship from Harland and Wolff on a defined budget. Laurentic thus appeared to be a ship at a discount, which was unusual in the history of the company.

Oddly, Laurentic was built with the hull number 470, while Doric, put into service in 1923 (four years before her), was hull number 573. This would suggest that order for Laurentic was made before 1921 and that the ship was unfinished for more than seven years. The cause of such a long delay is unknown, but is likely due to material shortages and the shipyard being too busy.

Laurentic had a similar profile to Doric, but she was bunkered with coal at a time when most new steamships were bunkered with oil. Her propulsion was similar to that of the first Laurentic, completed in 1909. She had three screws. A pair of four-cylinder triple-expansion steam engines drove her port and starboard screws. Exhaust steam from their low-pressure cylinders fed one low-pressure steam turbine, which drove her middle screw. This mode of propulsion, called "combination machinery", was first used in the first Laurentic of 1909. By the 1920s it had been largely supplanted by the use of geared turbines alone. White Star Line may have chosen combination machinery for its proven reliability for many years, but she proved to be costly to operate, which partly explains her short career. She could cruise at an average speed of 16.5 knots (30.6 km/h).

She was intended to be launched in October 1926, however the General Strike significantly delayed this. She was eventually launched without ceremony on 16 June 1927. She was completed five months later on 1 November, after which she left Belfast for Liverpool carrying representatives of White Star Line and Harland and Wolff.

== Design ==
Laurentic was the last in a series of four ships that the IMM ordered from Harland & Wolff shipyards, after Regina, Pittsburgh and Doric. All had a similar profile, with two funnels in their company colours framed by two masts, but Laurentic was slightly larger than her predecessors. Her tonnages were 18,724 GRT and 11,103 NRT, her registered length was 578.2 ft (176.2 m) and her beam was 75.4 ft (23.0 m). Whereas Regina, Pittsburgh and Doric had crane-shaped davits for their lifeboats, Laurentic had her boats on davits lined up in a double row of seven boats on each side. Unlike the other vessels, the Laurentic's aft funnel was connected to a boiler room, as opposed to an engine room. Her promenade was enclosed in a glass screen in the forward end with cruiser windows, somewhat resembling the Adriatic of 1907.

Her interior was designed for comfort. She had berths for 594 passengers in cabin class, 406 in tourist class and 500 in third class. Cabin-class facilities included Renaissance-style lounge, small lounge, Jacobean-style smoking room, card lounge, veranda cafe, gymnasium, and children's playroom. The most luxurious cabins were decorated in Louis XIV to Louis XVI styles. In the tourist class, a good part of the cabins could accommodate two people, the rest being designed for four and six. The third class offered cabins with four or six berths. These two classes offered dining rooms, lounges, smoking rooms, games rooms, common rooms and boudoir. The ship was designed for a crew of 420 people.

== Passenger career ==
Although intended to serve the Canada route, Laurentic made her maiden voyage on 12 November 1927 between Liverpool and New York, and made her second round trip on this route on 31 December. She then made two Mediterranean cruises, in January and March 1928. On 27 April, she made her first crossing on the Liverpool – Quebec – Montreal route. Since Owen Philipps, 1st Baron Kylsant took over the White Star Line, the Canadian route had been operated by two ships from the company in 1927, Calgaric and Albertic, as well as the older Doric, Megantic and Regina.

Over time, however, as passenger traffic diminished, Regina was sold to another company, Calgaric was assigned to cruises, Megantic was laid up in 1931 and sold to Japanese buyers for Scrap in 1933, and Albertic was assigned to the New York route. When Doric was in turn assigned to cruises in 1932, Laurentic remained the last White Star liner assigned to the Canadian route. On 3 October that year she collided with Lurigethan of the Mountain Steamship Co, in the Strait of Belle Isle. Both ships were damaged above the waterline but were able to continue their voyage. An inquiry determined that Laurentic was "55 percent responsible" for the accident.

On 25 February 1934, she made her last crossing on a regular route for the White Star between Boston, Halifax, Nova Scotia, and Liverpool. She was then assigned to cruising. In March of that year, she took 700 pilgrims from Dublin to Rome for the Easter. For this voyage, ten altars were installed aboard for priests to celebrate Mass, plus a cinema to entertain the pilgrims. That same year, shortly after Laurentic's pilgrim voyage, White Star Line merged with its rival, Cunard Line. Many surplus ships were sold as a result, but Laurentic was kept and temporarily assigned to the Montreal route, before returning to cruising.

In 1933 or 1934, there was a worldwide revision of the code letters of merchant ships. Laurentic's code letters KWPV were superseded by the new call sign GNJT.

In summer 1935, Laurentic made several cruises in Scandinavia, with fares as low as £1 per day. One of them, however, quickly turned into a disaster. On the night of Sunday 18 August, as Laurentic crossed the Irish Sea with 620 passengers aboard, Blue Star Line's 10,116 GRT refrigerated cargo ship Napier Star collided with her. Napier Star's bow penetrated deep into Laurentic's hull, instantly killing six crew members and injuring five others. The passengers were ordered to their boat stations, until the Master finally decided that the danger was past and sent them back to bed. Laurentic returned the next morning to Liverpool. Passengers were offered berths on a cruise aboard Doric, but she experienced a collision a few days later, ending her career.

The damage to Laurentic was not severe, but was estimated to have cost £20,000. Repairs were immediately made, as the ship was scheduled to take pilgrims from Dublin to Lourdes on 6 September. Harland & Wolff completed the repairs in time for her to be able to cruise. This proved to be her last commercial voyage. From December 1935, the ship was laid up in the River Mersey.

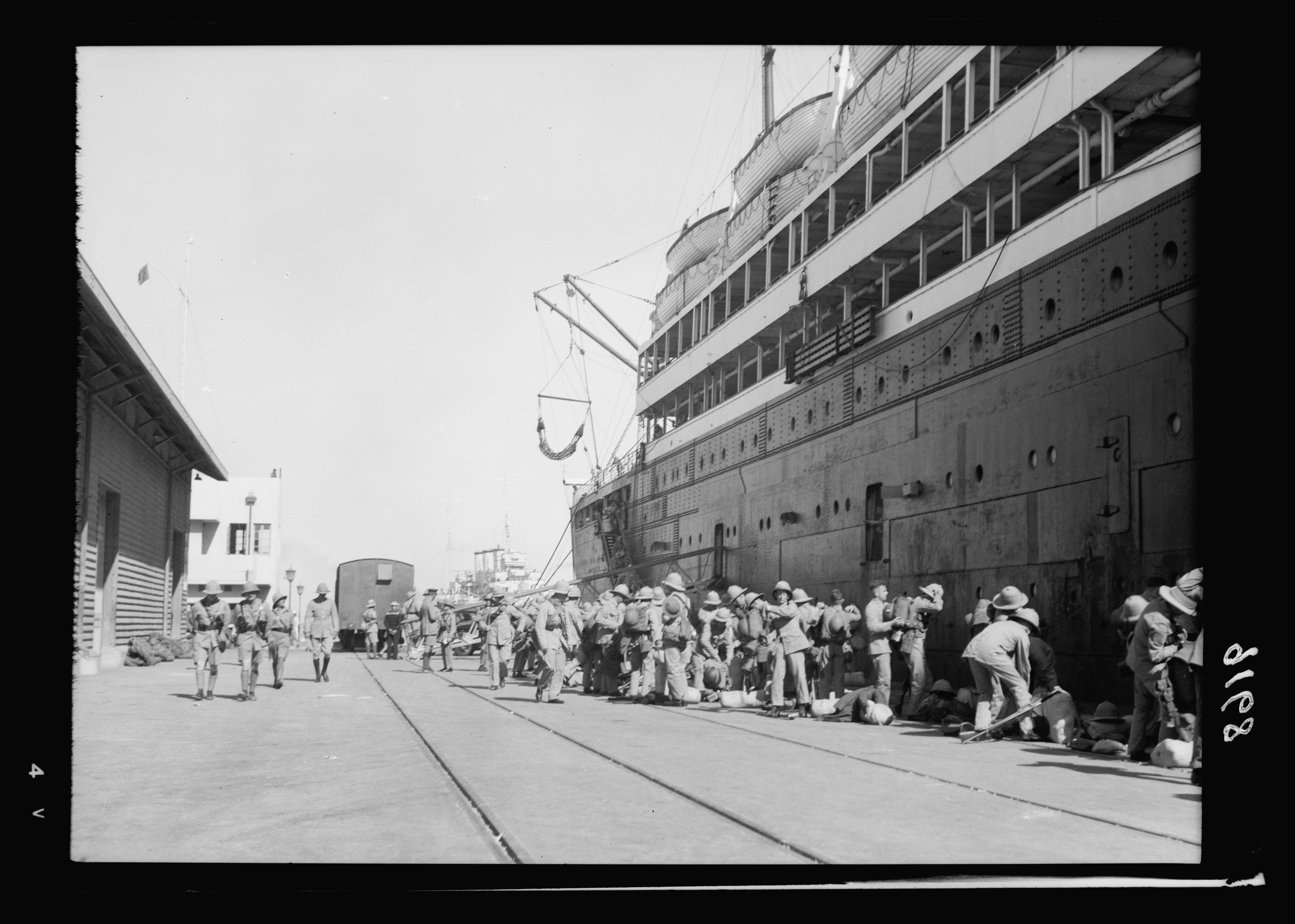
Laurentic in Haifa as a troop ship in 1936, with British troops on the quayside

After nine months laid up, in September 1936 Laurentic was dry docked in Gladstone Dock in Liverpool to return her to working order. She then sailed to Southampton to embark British troops on 14 September to take to Haifa in response to the Arab revolt in Palestine. She then returned to Southampton where she was again laid up. In 1937 she took part in the Coronation Naval Review of George VI at Spithead carrying government guests. From April 1938 she was laid up again, at first at Southampton and later at Falmouth.

== Armed merchant cruiser ==
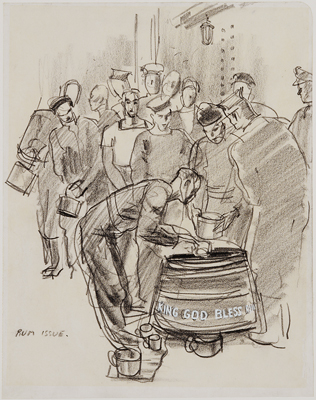
Rum Issue by John Worsley, who served aboard HMS Laurentic

On 26 August 1939, a few days before the World War II, the Admiralty requisitioned Laurentic. Her conversion into an armed merchant cruiser (AMC) for the Royal Navy was completed on 15 October. Her armament included BL 6-inch Mk XII naval guns, QF 3-inch 20 cwt anti-aircraft guns, and depth charges. She was commissioned as HMS Laurentic with the pennant number F51. She was one of the last ships of the Royal Navy to be bunkered with coal.

=== Loss ===
At 2140 hrs on 3 November 1940 German submarine U-99 torpedoed the Elders and Fyffes banana boat Casanare in the Western Approaches west of Bloody Foreland in Ireland. Laurentic and another AMC, HMS Patroclus, responded to Casanare's wireless distress message. When they arrived, U-99 attacked at about 2250 hrs with a torpedo that struck Laurentic in her engine room.

At 2328 hours, U-99 hit Laurentic with a second torpedo, but it failed to explode. At 2337 hrs, from a range of only 250 metres, U-99 fired a third torpedo, which struck Laurentic in the hole made by explosion of the first. Laurentic sighted U-99 and opened fire.

U-99 then attacked Patroclus, which was rescuing survivors from Casanare. Between 0002 hrs and 0118 hrs on 4 November U-99 hit Patroclus with four torpedoes and two of four rounds from her deck gun. At 0239 hrs an RAF Short Sunderland flying boat passed overhead, forcing U-99 to dive.

At 0404 hrs U-99 resurfaced and resumed her attack. At 0453 hrs she fired a torpedo that hit Laurentic astern, detonating her depth charges. She sank within minutes. Two officers and 47 ratings of her 416 complement were killed. U-99 then torpedoed Patroclus at 0516 hrs and 0525 hrs, breaking her back and sinking her.

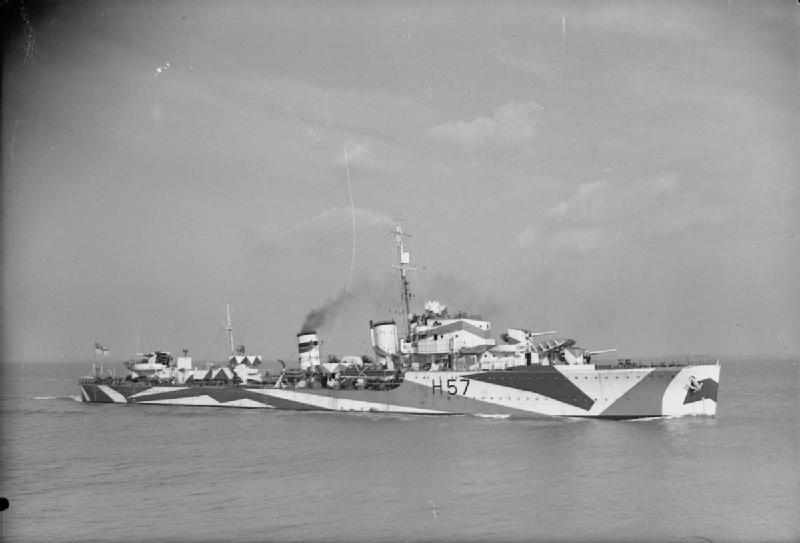
HMS Hesperus rescued 367 survivors from Laurentic

The destroyer HMS Hesperus then arrived, drove U-99 away and turned to rescue survivors from Laurentic. Hesperus picked up Laurentic's commander, Captain EP Vivian, 50 of his officers and 316 ratings. The destroyer HMS Beagle rescued survivors from Patroclus.

Laurentic was one of the last four White Star ships, along with the liners Britannic and Georgic and the tender Nomadic. Laurentic was also the last White Star ship to be sunk.

== Bibliography ==
- Anderson, Roy (1964). White Star. Prescot: T Stephenson & Sons Ltd. ISBN 978-0901314093.
- de Kerbrech, Richard (2009). Ships of the White Star Line. Shepperton: Ian Allan Publishing. ISBN 978-0-7110-3366-5.
- Eaton, John; Haas, Charles (1989). Falling Star, Misadventures of White Star Line Ships. Patrick Stephens Ltd. ISBN 1-85260-084-5.
- Haws, Duncan (1990). White Star Line. Merchant Fleets in Profile. Vol. 19. TCL Publications. ISBN 0-946378-16-9.
- Osborne, Richard; Spong, Harry & Grover, Tom (2007). Armed Merchant Cruisers 1878–1945. Windsor: World Warship Society. ISBN 978-0-9543310-8-5.
- Wilson, RM (1956). The Big Ships. London: Cassell & Co.
