= SS Doric =

Several vessels have been named SS Doric, including:

- SS Doric (1883), a British ocean liner built by Harland and Wolff and operated by White Star Line.
- SS Doric (1923), a second British ocean liner operated by White Star Line.
- SS Shalom, an ocean liner/cruise ship built operated by ZIM Lines, Israel for transatlantic service from Haifa to New York.
