= SS Atlantic (1953) =

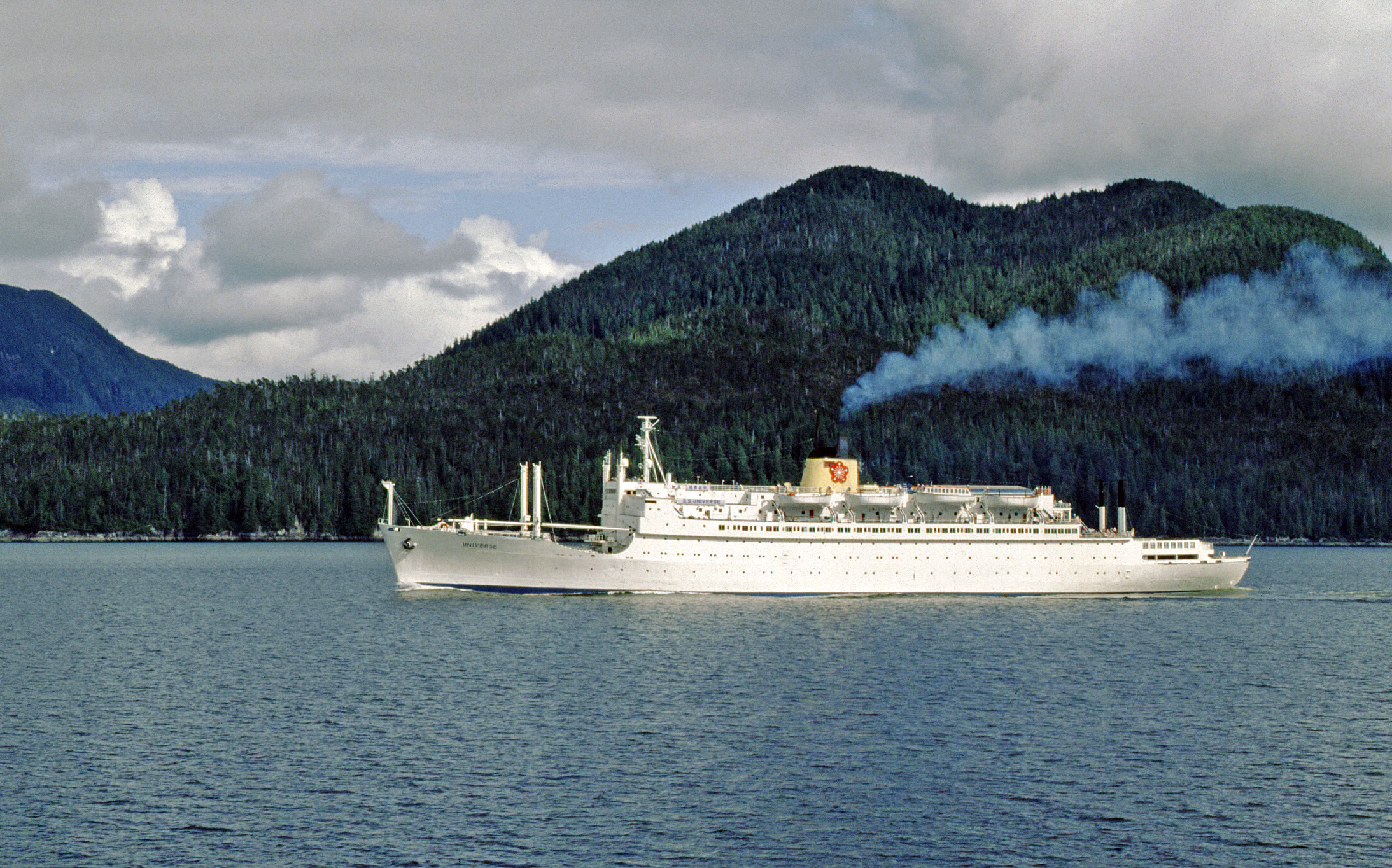
- As Universe at Canada's West Coast

History
- Name: SS Atlantic
- Operator: American Banner Lines (1958-1959); American Export Lines (1960-1971)
- Route: New York to Europe (American Banner Lines); Caribbean and Mediterranean Cruises; from New York and Florida (American Export Line)
- Ordered: 1952
- Builder: Sun Shipbuilding & Dry Dock Co.; Chester, Pennsylvania
- Laid down: 1952
- Launched: July 1, 1953
- Maiden voyage: 1953 (as SS Badger Mariner); June, 1958 (as SS Atlantic)
- In service: 1953
- Out of service: 1995
- Renamed: SS Universe Campus (1971); SS Universe (1976)
- Identification: IMO number: 5028837
- Fate: Sold ca. 1995 to breakers at Alang, India

General characteristics
- Type: passenger liner
- Tonnage: 18,100 GRT
- Length: 554 ft (169 m)
- Beam: 76 ft (23 m)
- Draught: 26 ft (7.9 m)
- Decks: 6 passenger decks
- Installed power: 2 Foster Wheeler WT boilers; operating at 620 PSI (Wet Pressure)
- Propulsion: Steam, D.R. geared turbines, 19250 HP, Single screw
- Speed: 20 kn (37 km/h; 23 mph)
- Capacity: 840 tourist class passengers; 40 first class passengers

SS Atlantic was an American-built vessel that operated for 42 years in various capacities. First designated SS Badger Mariner, she was originally built as a freighter in 1953. However, her career as a cargo vessel was relatively short. In 1958, she was rebuilt as a passenger liner. Renamed SS Atlantic, this ship became familiar to many American tourists during the 1960s, making cruises to the Caribbean and Mediterranean.

In 1971, she was retired from commercial service and purchased by C. Y. Tung, a Chinese shipping magnate, and converted to a university at sea, first as the SS Universe Campus, then as the SS Universe.

== Freighter ==
SS Badger Mariner was built as a 9,214 gross register ton cargo ship. Construction occurred in 1952 and 1953 at Sun Ship Building & Dry Dock Co., in Chester, Pennsylvania. She was launched on July 1, 1953. SS Badger Mariner was one of approximately 35 cargo ships of the C4-S-1a class designed and built to provide fast support for the US military, following the retirement of World War II liberty ships. She had a central-island superstructure, with three large deck cranes located forward and two large deck cranes located aft. These cranes serviced four forward hatches and two aft hatches, all of which were hydraulically operated. She had a length of 564 feet, a beam of 76 feet, and a draft of 26 feet, and could achieve a maximum speed of 20 knots. Her cargo capacity was 769,949 cubic feet, all of which was contained in below-deck holds. In 1958 she was sold to the American Banner Lines.

== Cruise ship ==
Upon acquiring the SS Badger Mariner in 1958, the American Banner Lines undertook an extensive conversion, turning the ship into a medium-sized passenger liner. This work took place at the Ingalls Ship Building Corporation at Pascagoula, Mississippi. Following this conversion, the linear dimensions of the ship remained the same. However, with the addition of passenger decks, her gross register tonnage increased to 14,138.

She was renamed SS Atlantic. The conversion successfully masked the ship’s origins as a freighter, and gave her a modern, well-proportioned, though slightly boxy, profile. Overall, her appearance was in keeping with other passenger vessels designed and built in the late 1950s and early 1960s. She sported a black hull with a white strip at the base of the superstructure, the lower deck of which retained the black coloration of the hull. Her upper superstructure was white and was topped by a squat blue funnel. She featured glass-enclosed promenades, running most of the length of both sides of the promenade deck, and spacious public rooms. On June 11, 1958, SS Atlantic departed on her maiden voyage. While under the American Banner Lines flag, she ran between New York, Antwerp, and Amsterdam. This service did not return the expected profit, and the vessel was again placed on the market in 1959.

SS Atlantic was soon acquired by the American Export Lines. An extensive refit, completed in May, 1960, increased her tonnage to 18,100 gross registered tons. She was turned into a warm-weather cruise ship, catering primarily to tourist class passengers. She was equipped with a large outdoor pool and was given an all white hull and superstructure. Her funnel, in keeping with the American Export Lines livery, was marked by black, white, and buff stripes. She could accommodate 880 passengers, 40 housed in first class accommodations. The vessel was fully air conditioned and each passenger cabin was equipped with a private bathroom. She was fitted with stabilizers in 1961. SS Atlantic had six passenger decks, with the uppermost designated as the Bridge Deck, and those below as the Boat Deck, Promenade Deck, Upper Deck, Main Deck, and “A” Deck, respectively.

Between 1960 and 1967, SS Atlantic ran successful cruises between New York, Florida, and the Caribbean, stopping at St. Thomas, Jamaica and other destinations. Her voyages were advertised as Beachcomber Cruises to the Caribbean. She also made 24-day cruises to the Mediterranean. In January 1967, the SS Atlantic ran aground on a sand bar when leaving Port Everglades, Fort Lauderdale, Florida on a seven-day Caribbean cruise. Tugs required two days to dislodge the ship, which returned to Port Everglades without significant damage. Later in 1967, the vessel was withdrawn from service due to declines in passenger traffic.

== University at Sea ==
In 1971, the vessel was purchased by C. Y. Tung, was registered to Seawise Foundation, Inc., and was designated SS Universe Campus. From this point forward, she had a very successful career traveling the globe as a university for World Campus Afloat, a program that later changed its name to Semester at Sea. The vessel housed about 500 students and 60 faculty members for four-month semesters. In 1976, SS Universe Campus was renamed SS Universe and registered in Liberia. By 1989, she had carried more than 20,000 students.

== Disposition ==
As a result of aging boilers, delayed sailings, and mounting repair bills, SS Universe was retired in 1995. She was towed to Alang, India, where she was scrapped in 1996.
