= SS Doric (1922) =

British ocean liner

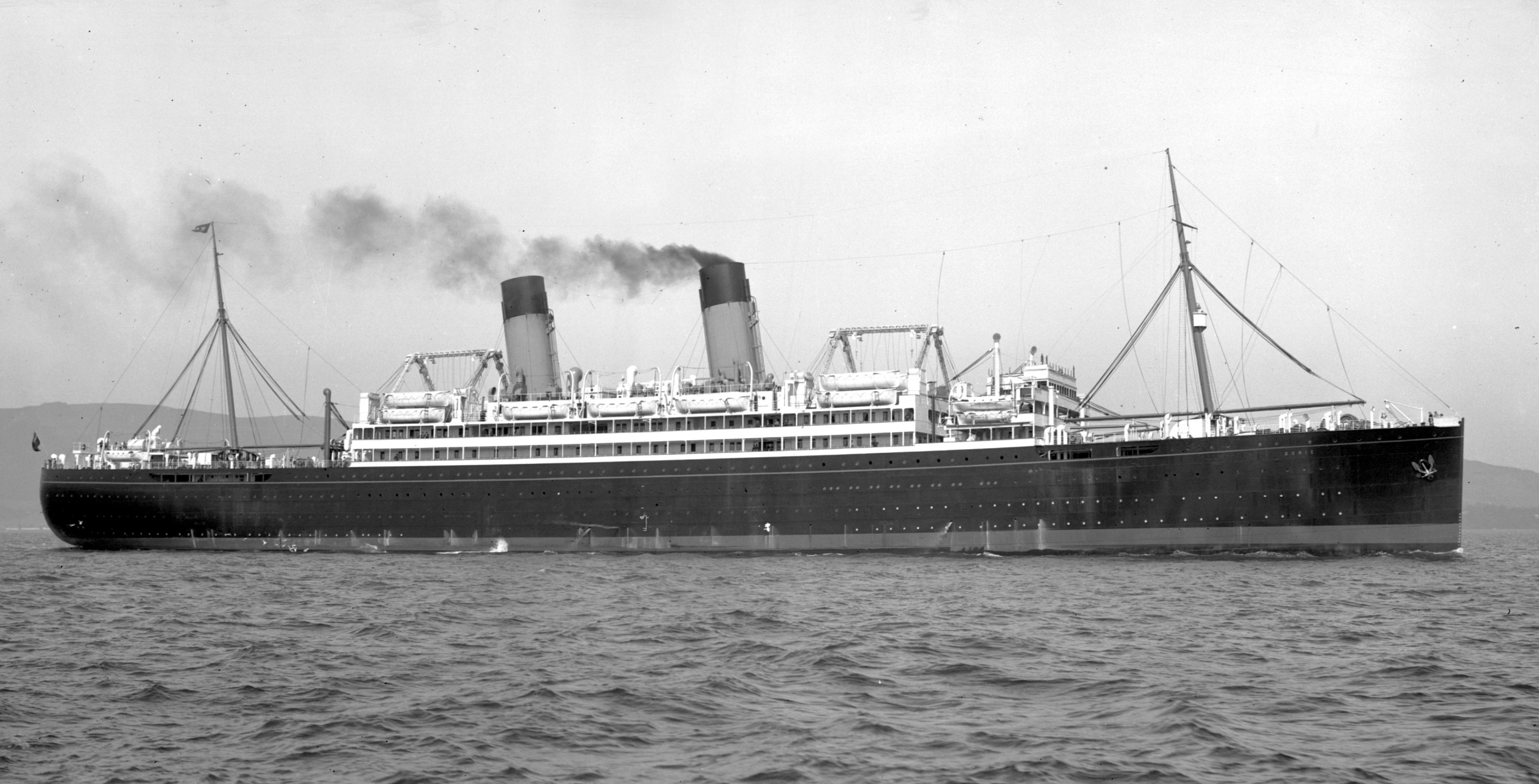
- SS Doric on sea trials

History

United Kingdom
- Name: Doric
- Owner: 1923–1934: White Star Line; 1934–1935: Cunard White Star Line
- Port of registry: Liverpool, United Kingdom
- Route: Liverpool to Quebec and Montreal
- Builder: Harland & Wolff, Belfast, Northern Ireland
- Yard number: 573
- Laid down: November 1921
- Launched: 8 August 1922
- Completed: 29 May 1923
- Maiden voyage: 8 June 1923
- In service: 1923–1935
- Out of service: 1935
- Fate: Scrapped 1935 at Monmouthshire, Wales

General characteristics
- Type: Ocean liner
- Tonnage: 16,484 GRT
- Length: 183.1 m (600 ft 9 in)
- Beam: 20.6 m (67 ft 7 in)
- Installed power: 9,000 hp (6,700 kW)
- Propulsion: Twin-screw propellers
- Speed: 15 knots (28 km/h; 17 mph)
- Capacity: 2,271 passengers

SS Doric was a British ocean liner operated by White Star Line. She was put into service in 1923. She was the second ship of the company to bear this name. Built by Harland and Wolff in Belfast, she was the company's second and last ship to be exclusively powered by turbines, after SS Vedic.

A liner of medium size and low speed for the time, and divided into two classes, she was designed to serve Canadian routes, which she did from her being put into service in June 1923 until 1932. She was accompanied on this route by a similar vessel, SS Regina, which was originally operated by the Dominion Line. This decade of Canadian service unfolded without major incident. When the White Star Line abandoned this route, the Doric was assigned to cruises, meeting with great success with young passengers of the time.

When the company merged with its rival, the Cunard Line, Doric was retained in the new fleet. However, a collision with another ship in September 1935 sealed her fate. Severely damaged and economically irreparable, despite her young age, the company decided to scrap the ship, which commenced later that year.

== Design ==
The Doric was a medium-sized ocean liner for its time, 183 metres (600 ft 5 in) long, 20 metres (65 ft 7 in) wide and 16,484 gross register tons (GRT). With four decks, she had two masts and two funnels. These were in the colours of the White Star Line, while the ship's hull was black, with a base of red anti-rust paint and a white superstructure. Her profile was, in general, very similar to that of the Pittsburgh and Regina built shortly before by the Harland & Wolff shipyards. The liner was fitted with nine holds, and was able to carry 583 cabin-class passengers and 1,688 third-class passengers on her debut.

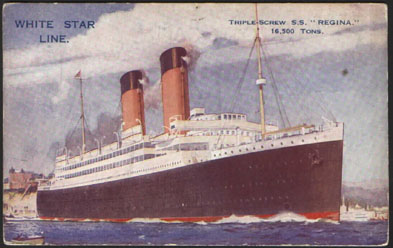
SS Regina, the ship that inspired Doric's design

Along with the Vedic, Doric was the second ship of the White Star Line to be powered by turbines. Like all of the company's ships until Britannic, its propulsion unit was powered by coal and not fuel oil. The liner was not designed to reach high speeds and sailed at an average of 15 knots (28 km/h; 17 mph).

In cabin class, the cabins were decorated in the Louis XVI style, the largest being three-room suites. Third-class cabins were designed for two, three or four passengers. An orchestra played in the dining room and hostesses were responsible for looking after unaccompanied young women and children. From 1926, the Doric could carry 320 cabin class passengers, 657 in tourist class and 537 in third. During the overhaul which reorganised her cabins, the imposing davits (large cranes capable of lowering many boats in succession, tested in particular on the Britannic of 1915), were replaced by more classic davits of the Welin type, used on most of the company's liners.

== History ==
=== Construction and service to Canada ===
Before World War I, the International Mercantile Marine Co. ordered Harland & Wolff shipyards to build several ships for its companies. The first two, the Regina and the Pittsburgh, started in 1913, were completed after the war and put into service in the early 1920s. Doric was the third ship built on this model and a fourth, slightly larger, the Laurentic, would follow in 1927. The keel of Doric was laid in 1921, and the hull was launched on 8 August 1922, and delivered on 29 May 1923.

Doric made her maiden voyage between Liverpool and Montreal via Quebec on the following 8 June. She then remained on this service for several years, but stopped during winter in Halifax, the St. Lawrence River being frozen and impassable. On this route, she was accompanied by Regina, similar in appearance but operated by another company, the Dominion Line; the two ships were supposed to provide a joint service between the two companies. The Regina however took the colors of the White Star Line in 1925, when it absorbed the remains of the Dominion Line.

In 1926, her accommodation, originally intended only for the cabin class and the third class, was revised to integrate a tourist class. On 14 September 1927, the bow of the liner was damaged in Montreal by the British ship Barrie, but rapid repairs enabled her to reach Liverpool without incident. Another incident occurred on 8 December 1930, when the ship, then undergoing maintenance in the port of Liverpool, was the victim of a fire which affected several of her cabins before being brought under control.

At the beginning of the 1930s, the Great Depression strongly affected the White Star Line, which had to eliminate its less profitable crossings. This was how the Doric, like Homeric at the same time, was withdrawn from service, before being reassigned to cruises to bring in some additional funds.

=== Cruise service and fate ===
Doric was still in use after her withdrawal from the Canadian route in October 1932. In April 1933, after several months of waiting in Liverpool, she was reassigned to cruising in the Mediterranean Sea. The liner proved to be very popular with a clientele of young people, in particular young couples, which earned it the nickname "Cupid's ship"; and it was the scene of no fewer than nine engagement announcements during a cruise. In 1934, the White Star Line and its rival, the Cunard Line, merged. The Doric was one of the ships to be preserved due to her young age unlike the other older ships within the newly merged fleet. She continued her cruises, departing from Southampton, with very reduced tourist prices: 12 pounds sterling for thirteen days of cruise.

The cruise of 5 September 1935 sealed her fate. Doric was carrying 736 passengers and 350 crew members and has just made the last stop of her trip at Gibraltar, when she was in a heavy fog off Portugal. During the night, at around 3 AM, she collided with the French vessel Formigny, of the Chargeurs Reunis line, off Cape Finisterre. One watertight compartment was flooded, causing a list to starboard. As a precautionary measure, an SOS was immediately sent out and women and children were put on lifeboats.

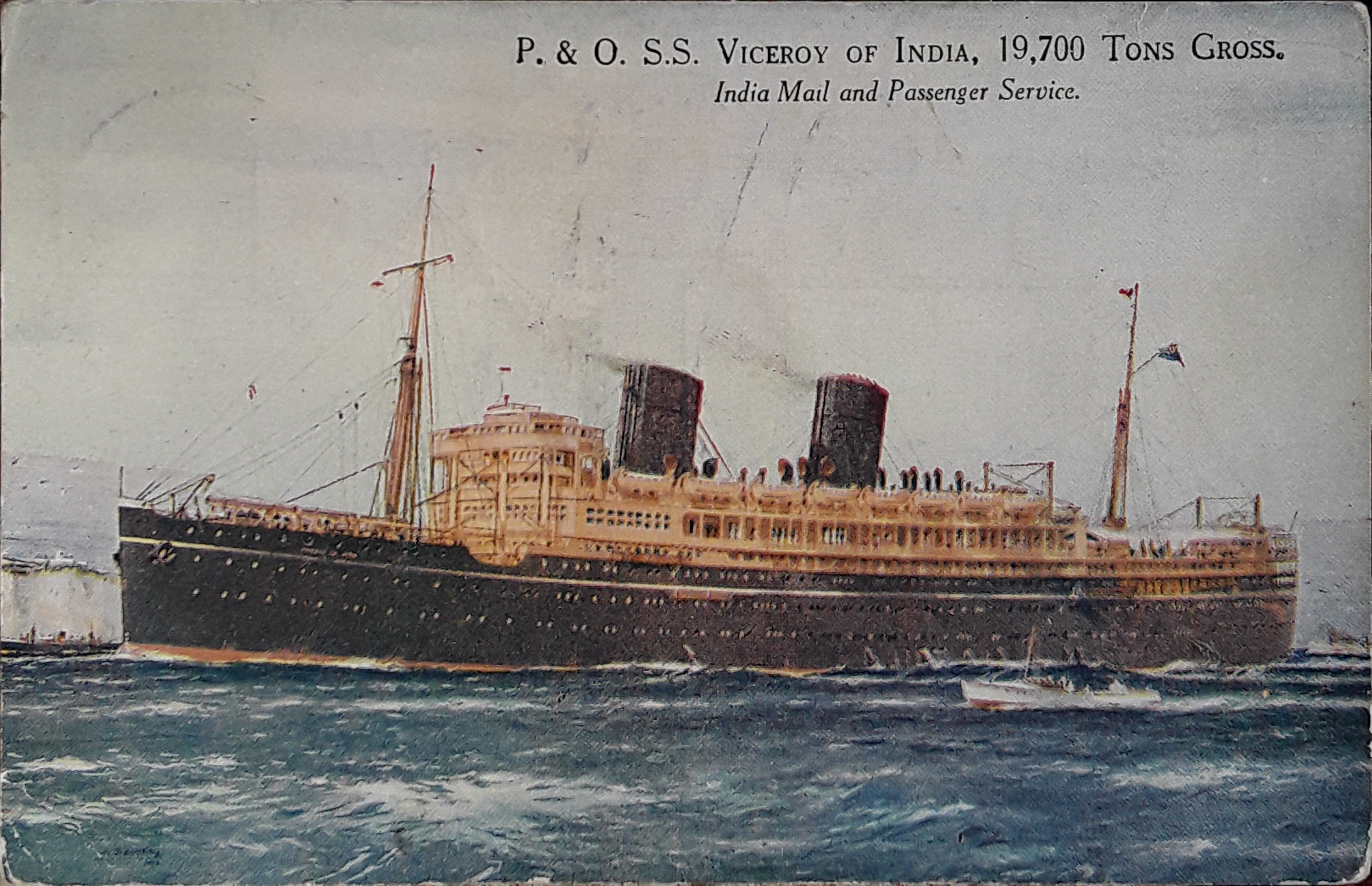
RMS Viceroy of India, one of the ships that was assisting Doric during her collision

Two lifeboats left the ship, but returned an hour later. The distress signals were picked up by two ships, Orion, an Orient Line ship on her maiden voyage, and the P&O's Viceroy of India, which came to aid. Reassured, passengers were allowed to take personal effects in their cabins, and were served to breakfast in the liner's dining room while waiting for help to arrive. The passenger transfer then went off without a hitch, with part of the crew of the Doric remaining on board. The incident caused no casualty.

Following this collision, temporary repairs were carried out on Doric at Vigo, Spain. However, once she returned to England, her damage was determined to be a constructive total loss, and the ship was sold in October 1935 for scrap to John Cashmore Ltd. for £35,000. She was subsequently scrapped in November 1935 at Cashmores shipbreaker's yard in Newport, Monmouthshire.

== Bibliography ==
- Anderson, Roy Claude (1964). White Star. Prescot: T. Stephenson & Sons Ltd. OCLC 3134809.
- de Kerbrech, Richard (2009). Ships of the White Star Line. Shepperton: Ian Allan Publishing. ISBN 978-0-7110-3366-5.
- Eaton, John; Haas, Charles (1989). Falling Star, Misadventures of White Star Line Ships. Patrick Stephens Ltd. ISBN 1-85260-084-5.
- Haws, Duncan (1990). White Star Line. Merchant Fleets. Vol. 17. Hereford: TCL Publications. ISBN 0-946378-16-9. OCLC 50214776.
