= Arnold Bernstein =

German-American shipowner

- Born: January 23, 1888; Breslau, Silesia, German Empire
- Died: March 1971 (age 83); Ocean Ridge, Florida, U.S.
- Citizenship: United States
- Occupation: Shipowner

Arnold Bernstein (23 January 1888, in Breslau, Silesia, German Empire – March 1971 in Ocean Ridge, Florida, U.S.) was a German-American shipowner and pioneer of transatlantic car transport, which he revolutionised since he was transporting cars without boxing them up in wooden crates as was usual before and was thus able to reduce freight rates. When the 1929 Great Depression made the use of 'swimming garages' impractical, Bernstein then turned his cargo ships into passenger ships, with just one travel class, which he called tourist class, rather than two or three that were more usual. One of the first Jewish 'merchant princes', he was one of the victims of the Nazi appropriation policies.

== Early life ==
The eldest son of the Jewish businessman Max Bernstein and his wife Franziska Altmann, Arnold Bernstein was born 23 January 1888 in Breslau, capital city of the Prussian province of Silesia (today Wrocław, Poland). He had three sisters, Else, Alice, and Rose. Arnold considered himself to be a lazy student contrary to the values of his family. His primary education ended by age 14 and his attitude began to change when he apprenticed to his father in 1902. By the age of 21, he had adopted his father's culture of a strict work ethic and honor code for business which he carried in 1909 to the Hanseatic port city of Hamburg.

He fought in the German artillery during the First World War, rising from sergeant to captain, but he was not allowed into the Officer Corps because he was Jewish. He fought in battles at Noyon, Ypres, and at the Somme, and was awarded the Iron Cross first class.

== Career ==
Arnold Bernstein Shipping Company house flag.

Bernstein founded his first shipping company in 1919. During World War I, he served in the military. After the war, he returned to his business as the Arnold Bernstein Line. Over the course of the next decade, he grew the value of his shipping enterprises. He revolutionized how vehicles were transported across the Atlantic, greatly reducing shipping costs.

When the Great Depression began in 1929, demand to ship cars from the United States to Europe plummeted. His cargo shipping business was no longer profitable, so he converted the ships to passenger ships. Rather than have three different passenger classes, his ships had just one class for all passengers. In 1934, he bought the British Red Star line from United States lines. He turned the company around, from losing $500,000 annually to a profitable company by simultaneously using the ships as both passenger and cargo ships. Several years later, Bernstein owned three successful passenger lines that operated in Europe, the United States, and British Palestine.

During the early 1930s, Bernstein personally experienced the growing anti-Semitism even though he did not consider himself a practicing religious Jew. Bernstein did not trust Hitler's promise to Hindenburg that he would not harm Jews who had fought in the first World War, but his wife did not want to emigrate. Bernstein founded the Palestine Shipping Company (1934), which emerged as an important link for Jewish emigration to Palestine during the late 1930s.

In February 1937, Bernstein was arrested on charges of foreign exchange offenses. At the time of his arrest, he was the owner of one of the largest Jewish businesses in Germany. After being held in jail for eleven months, he was tried in court for violating Germany's currency laws and treason. The prosecutor said Bernstein had an undeclared bank account of over US$80,000 in New York. Bernstein did not deny having the account, but he said he felt it did not need to be reported because it was partly for his shipping business and also because there was a $96,000 claim on his business. Bernstein was convicted of violating Germany's foreign-exchange laws by having an undeclared foreign bank account, and he was sentenced to 30 months imprisonment, inclusive of time served, and a fine of 1 million Reichsmarks (equivalent to $9.1 million in 2025). The German government confiscated all the ships he owned, and it later liquidated the business.

Bernstein was released by Germany authorities in 1939. After making a payment of $30,000 (equivalent to US$700,000 in 2025), he was allowed to leave Germany for Holland. The funds had been raised by friends, who withheld payment until Bernstein arrived at the border crossing. Bernstein and his wife Lilli left Europe for New York aboard Nieuw Amsterdam at Southampton on August 25, 1939, and they arrived in New York on September 1, the day that Germany invaded Poland. There were 1,286 passengers on board, despite having a capacity of 1,150. Nieuw Amsterdam, a ship owned by the Holland America Line, was called the "first war refugee" ship, because it was the first to take on passengers in excess of capacity because of the fear of war breaking out. When Bernstein arrived in New York, he said he had been imprisoned by the German government because he was Jewish. He said, "They had to get rid of me. I employed thousands of German sailors and I was head of a shipping company. I am of Jewish origin and they could not have me talking to Göring," the President of the Reichstag.

He had very little money but was highly regarded in his business skills. He recruited investors while assets and credit were difficult to obtain during wartime. In 1940, he founded the Arnold Bernstein Steamship Corporation in New York. He became a U.S. citizen the same year.

In 1945, Bernstein sued Holland America Line in a United States District Court. Bernstein testified that he had been pressured to sign over the Red Star Line, particularly after a Chemical Bank representative visited him in prison and told him that "You know for yourself what happens to Jews who refuse to transfer their property." He was convinced that was the only way he could be released from imprisonment in Germany was to transfer the shipping business to a Nazi trustee. Holland America Line later bought the Red Star Line's ships from the Nazis for $11 million (equivalent to $132 million in 2025). Some ships from the Arnold Bernstein Line had been taken over by the Allies, but the Red Star Line had been sold to the Holland America Line. The two lines were valued at $4 million (equivalent to $58 million in 2025). The U.S. federal court ruled that unlawful acts committed by the German government in Germany were not reviewable by a U.S. court, and it dismissed the lawsuit.

Bernstein was a flexible thinker who preferred straightforward methods, but he would develop complex transactions to match the needs of investors, customers and regulators. Along with other shipping industry executives, in the late 1940s, he saw an opportunity to provide a quality passenger cruise ship experience that would allow visits to smaller and older ports that the larger trans-Atlantic cruise ships were not able to meet.

Bernstein once said, "All business is a kind of war and you stand a fair chance of winning if you stick to your guns."

His first attempt to purchase the defunct partially converted cargo ship Nilla, previously the World War II LST HMS Bruiser, for conversion to a small passenger cruise ship began with a negotiation with its owners. Using Triora S.A., Panama, his investor group planned to purchase the ship and rename her Silver Star (not Silverstar). Triora S.A. was named in honor of the people of Triora who aided Francesco Moraldo in hiding two Jewish orphans from the Nazis. On 2 February 1950 the vessel left Antwerp under tow for Hamburg. However the sale to Triora S.A. had fallen through. Finally in May 1950 her owners closed the sale of Nilla to a "Swiss" investor, Mr. Vasile Ladislau "Leslie" Winkler (b. 12 Aug 1914 in Romania), who had a residence in Paris at the time. He registered the ship in Panama, owned by Compania de Naviera Rio Grande. (The brilliant Mr. Winkler was an example of a highly capable shipping industry agent displaced by war.) Nilla was still an attractive vessel to Bernstein because it could be converted for either full passenger ship or partial passenger/car carrier ship. Mr. Winkler's purchase was a way to fulfill Bernstein's assurance of a sale to the original sellers.

In 1951, Bernstein arranged the purchase of the vessel by SGS Société de Surveillance S. A. in Geneva, Switzerland (with registered owner: Compania Naviera Estrella de Plata S. A., Panama, call sign: HOHX) and renamed Silverstar. (Estrella de Plata is the specific Spanish language way of translating Silver Star, the award first granted during World War II to U.S. Forces for gallantry in action against an enemy.) Because of his vast and detailed knowledge and experience in passenger shipping, Bernstein involved himself in the details of conversion. A successful operation of the vessel would be essential to the growth of his personal wealth; every penny he could save would make the possibility of success more likely. Every aid to efficient operation he could add during conversion would potentially increase profitability and safety.

Silverstar was brought into the shipyard of Howaldtswerke AG, Hamburg for conversion into a cruise liner while at the same time she was lengthened by 22 feet (6.71 m) at the stern. Bernstein had personal and professional connections with executives of the shipyard, and so did Winkler. To accommodate a maximum of 420 passengers, 171 air-conditioned passenger cabins were provided at time when air-conditioned cabins were not standard. Beginning in 1952 the Bernstein-controlled Silver Star Line sailed Silverstar for "informal" vacation cruises from Washington DC, Charleston, Miami, and New Orleans to the Caribbean Sea, calling mainly in ports like Bermuda, Nassau, Havana and Vera Cruz. At the end of each summer, she sailed to West Germany for annual dry docking. In March 1955 Silverstar made a port of call in Tunis on a Mediterranean cruise. In December 1956 the charter on the vessel was transferred to Caribbean Cruise Lines and she sailed for one additional voyage. In January of 1957, Silverstar was sold to state-owned Flota Argentina de Navegación Fluvial (Buenos Aires) and renamed Ciudad de Santa Fé.

In 1957, Bernstein founded the American Banner Lines in New York and arranged the financing for purchase and conversion of the freighter Badger Mariner into a passenger ship. In 1958, it was put into service as the passenger vessel Atlantic in the New York-Antwerp-Amsterdam trade, but competition with airlines caused him difficulty in financing a sister ship. In 1959, he sold Atlantic to American Export Lines in order to be refitted as a warm weather cruise liner, and he decided to retire at the age of 71, to his home in New Rochelle, New York, because of his declining health.

== Personal life ==
Bernstein married Lilli Kimmelstiel (born 20 June 1896 in Hamburg) on May 1, 1919. They had a son Ronald and a daughter Stephanie.

During the 1950s, Bernstein lived in Larchmont, New York. He retired in 1959, due to his declining health. During his retirement years, he became interested in ecology, and he wrote extensively about the subject. He had a home in New Rochelle, New York, and Ocean Ridge, Florida.

Bernstein died of a heart ailment in Ocean Ridge, Florida.

== Ships ==
Under German Flag

- Max, freighter
- Keilberg, freighter
- Betty, tugboat
- Odin, freighter
- Aegir, freighter
- Frithjof, freighter
- Max Bernstein, freighter
- Falkenstein, freighter
- Johanna, freighter
- Charlotte, lighter
- Schleswig-Holstein, freighter
- Eberstein, freighter
- Hohenstein, freighter, renamed Tel Aviv in 1935
- Gerolstein, freighter & passenger ship
- Königstein, freighter & passenger ship
- Ilsenstein, freighter & passenger ship
- Lichtenstein, freighter
- Lahnstein, freighter
- Traunstein, freighter
- Drachenstein, freighter
- Gravenstein, freighter
- Pennland, transatlantic ocean liner
- Westernland, transatlantic ocean liner

Under non-German flag

- Panamanian, freighter
- Orbis, freighter
- Continental, passenger ship
- Europa, passenger ship
- Silverstar, passenger ship (1952–56)
- Atlantic, passenger ship (1958–59)
