= SS Pennland =

Liner, launched 1920

Coordinates: 37°06′N 23°30′E

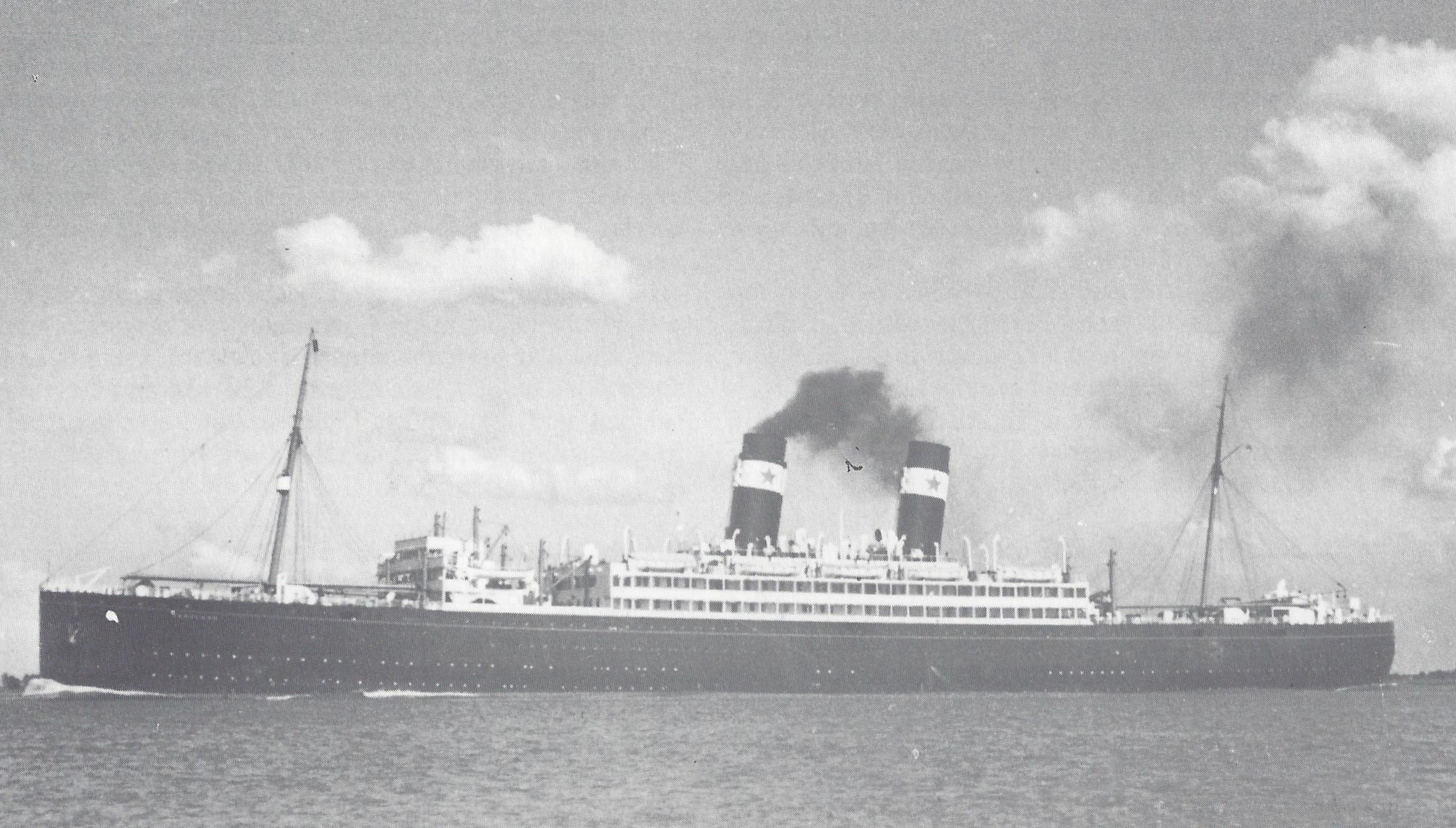
- Pennland in Red Star Line service

History
- Name: 1920: Pittsburgh; 1926: Pennland
- Namesake: 1920: Pittsburgh; 1926: Pennsylvania
- Owner: 1922: International Nav Co; 1928: F Leyland & Co; 1934: Red Star Line; 1939: Holland America Line
- Operator: 1922: White Star Line; 1928: Red Star Line; 1939: Holland America Line
- Port of registry: 1922: (United Kingdom) Liverpool; 1935: (Nazi Germany) Hamburg; 1939: (Netherlands) Rotterdam
- Route: 1922: Liverpool – Boston – Philadelphia; 1922–23: Bremen – Southampton – Halifax – New York; 1923: Hamburg – Southampton – Halifax – New York; 1928: Antwerp – Southampton – Cherbourg – New York; 1935: Antwerp – Le Havre – Southampton – Halifax – New York
- Yard number: 457
- Laid down: November 1913
- Launched: 11 November 1920
- Completed: 25 May 1922
- Maiden voyage: 6 June 1922
- Reclassified: 1940: troop ship
- Refit: 1935
- Identification: UK official number 145933; code letters KMDT (1922–33); call sign GFJS (1934); call sign DJNX (1935–39); call sign PGRX (1939–41)
- Fate: Sunk 25 April 1941

General characteristics
- Type: Ocean liner
- Tonnage: 1923: 16,322 GRT, 9,856 NRT; 1934: 16,082 GRT, 9,513 NRT
- Length: 575.4 ft (175.4 m)
- Beam: 67.8 ft (20.7 m)
- Depth: 41.2 ft (12.6 m)
- Decks: 4
- Propulsion: 3 × screws; 2 × triple-expansion engines; 1 × exhaust steam turbine
- Speed: 16 knots (30 km/h)
- Capacity: 1922: 600 cabin class, 1,500 third class; 1935: 486 or 550 tourist class; 19,920 cubic feet (564 m^{3}) refrigerated cargo
- Crew: as troop ship: about 300
- Sensors & processing systems: by 1930: submarine signalling; wireless direction finding
- Notes: sister ships: Westernland, Doric

SS Pennland was a transatlantic ocean liner that was launched as Pittsburgh in Ireland in 1920 and renamed Pennland in 1926. She had a succession of UK, German and Dutch owners and operators. In 1940 she was converted into a troopship.

In 1941 a Luftwaffe air attack crippled her in the Mediterranean, so her Royal Navy escort sank her by gunfire. She is now a shipwreck in the Saronic Gulf.

== Construction ==
Harland & Wolff laid down Pittsburgh in its Belfast shipyard in November 1913 for the International Navigation Company (IMM). She was to be a sister ship for Regina, which Harland & Wolff was building in its Govan shipyard in Scotland.

On 28 July 1914 the First World War began, and in August work on Pittsburgh was suspended. Work resumed after the war and she was launched on 11 November 1920. On 22 May 1922 Harland & Wolff completed her and delivered her to the International Navigation Company, which was an IMM subsidiary. Her UK official number was 145933 and she was registered in Liverpool.

Pittsburgh's registered length was 575.3 ft (175.4 m), her beam was 67.8 ft (20.7 m) and her depth was 41.2 ft (12.6 m). As built she had berths for 2,100 passengers: 600 cabin class and 1,500 third class. Regina and Pittsburgh were among the first ships to offer cabin class accommodation. Her holds had 19,920 cubic feet (564 m^{3}) of refrigerated space for perishable cargo. As built, her tonnages were 16,322 GRT and 9,856 NRT.

Pittsburgh had three screws. A pair of four-cylinder triple-expansion steam engines drove her port and starboard screws. Exhaust steam from their low-pressure cylinders powered a low-pressure steam turbine that drove her middle screw. Between them the three engines gave her a speed of 16 knots (30 km/h). She had two funnels and two masts. Pittsburgh was installed with substantial electrical equipment including the latest model of Wilson-Pirrie electric steering gear, electrically-controlled lifeboat davits, and 17 electric cargo winches.

Harland & Wolff launched a third sister, Doric, in 1922. She differed from Regina and Pittsburgh by having twin screws and pure turbine propulsion.

== Pittsburgh (1922–1926) ==
White Star Line, which was another IMM subsidiary, was Pittsburgh's first operator. On 6 June 1922 she left Liverpool on her maiden voyage, which was to Boston and Philadelphia.

On 14 November 1922 the Italian 7,434 GRT steamship Monte Grappa transmitted a distress signal that she was in danger of sinking. Pittsburgh rescued her 45 Italian crew when they abandoned ship.

After less than six months White Star Line changed Pennland's route. On 1 December she left Bremen on her first voyage via Southampton and Halifax, Nova Scotia to New York.

In a gale early on the morning of 30 March 1923 Pittsburgh was in mid-Atlantic east by south of Newfoundland when a huge wave struck her. It wrecked her bridge, wheelhouse, chart room and Master's cabin. Water entering through her ventilators flooded eight cabins in the forward part of her superstructure. The wave was so high that it flooded the crow's nest on her main mast, drenching the able seaman who was on watch as lookout. Captain Thomas Jones was injured by broken glass, and one of his crew was injured by broken glass and splintered wood.

Pittsburgh stopped for her crew to clear the wreckage and improvise an engine order telegraph. The impact damaged her compasses and knocked them out of adjustment, which impeded navigation, but on 4 April she safely reached Bremen.

In November 1923 the German terminus of Pittsburgh's route was changed from Bremen to Port of Hamburg.

== Pennland in civilian service (1926–1940) ==
In 1926 Pittsburgh was renamed Pennland to conform with the naming style of Red Star Line, whose ships all had names ending in "-land". In 1928 IMM transferred her ownership to another of its subsidiaries, Frederick Leyland and Company. She was transferred to the route between Antwerp and New York via Southampton and Cherbourg. Her sister ship Regina, now renamed Westernland, joined her on the route.

In 1934 IMM sold Red Star Line to Arnold Bernstein. Her last Red Star Line voyage for IMM was on the same route and began on 16 November that year.

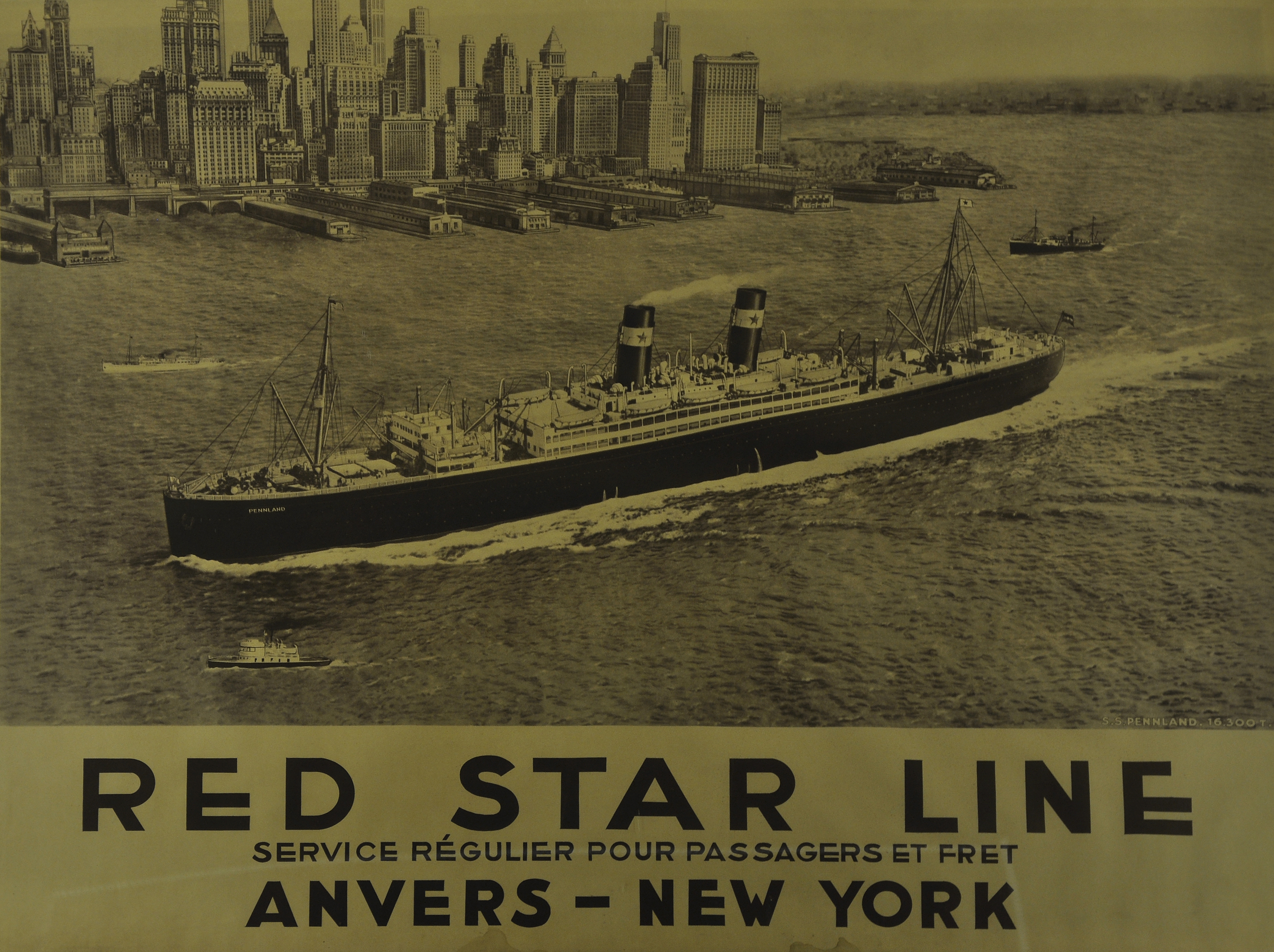
Red Star Line poster showing Pennland arriving in New York

In 1935 Bernstein had Pennland refitted at Kiel as a one-class ship with berths for either 486 or 550 tourist class passengers. She was registered in Hamburg. She continued to sail between Antwerp and New York, but calling at Le Havre, Southampton and Halifax. She began her first voyage for Bernstein from Antwerp on 10 May 1935.

In 1939 Nazi Germany exiled Bernstein, and his German businesses were dissolved. Holland America Line (NASM) bought the Red Star Line fleet including Pennland, which it registered in Rotterdam. Pennland remained on the same route.

After the Second World War began in September 1939, Pennland continued her usual service between Antwerp and New York via Southampton. On 19 October she called at Plymouth, which was not one of her usual ports of call.

On 26 April 1940 Pennland left Antwerp for New York as usual. On 10 May Germany invaded the Netherlands and Belgium. Pennland reached New York on 16 May.

== Pennland as a troop ship (1940–1941) ==
The Ministry of War Transport chartered Pennland from NASM and had her converted into a troop ship. She spent a month in New York, leaving on 26 June for Halifax. There she joined Convoy HX 54, which reached Liverpool on 14 July. She spent six weeks in Liverpool, leaving on 31 August under escort carrying 1,200 Free French troops via Freetown in Sierra Leone to Douala in French Cameroon.

Pennland spent a month in Freetown and then sailed to Bathurst in South Africa, where she arrived on 31 October. She then returned to West Africa, where her ports of call included Lagos in Nigeria and Takoradi on the Gold Coast.

On 21 November Pennland left Freetown and crossed the Atlantic to the Caribbean. She reached Barbados on 29 November, spent 2–7 December in Kingston, Jamaica, and then sailed to Halifax. On 16 December she left Halifax carrying 1,856 troops with joined Convoy TC 8, which reached the Firth of Clyde on Christmas Day 1940.

On 12 January 1941 Pennland left Belfast for Egypt. She sailed with Convoy WS 5B to Freetown, called at Durban 11–15 February and reached Suez on 3 March. She sailed through the Suez Canal, reached Port Said on 23 March and Alexandria the next day.

On 1 April 1941 Pennland left Alexandria with troops for Greece. On 4 April she left Port of Piraeus and returned to Alexandria. On 6 April Germany invaded Greece and Yugoslavia, and on 12–15 April Pennland was in Piraeus for a second time.

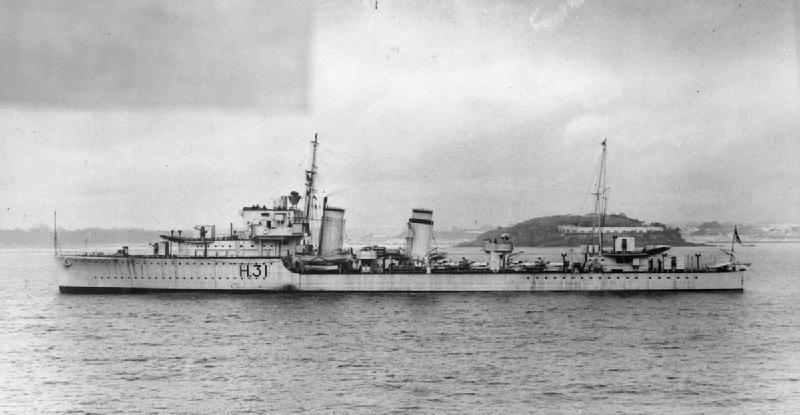
HMS Griffin sank Pennland after an air attack crippled her

German forces advanced deep into Greece, and the Allies started to evacuate their troops. On 23 April Pennland left Alexandria for Megara in Attica, where thousands of Australian troops were to be evacuated.

An attack by German dive-bombers on 25 April off the island of Agios Georgios in the Saronic Gulf prevented Pennland from reaching Megara. Her master, Captain Johann van Dulken, was wounded, and her three compasses were smashed. One bomb penetrated her deck and exploded in her engine room, killing four of her crew. Her purser, Albert la Grange, was below decks inspecting damage when a bomb hit the ship, extinguishing her lights and puncturing her hull.

Pennland's chief officer, Pieter van Beelen, took command and ordered her crew to abandon ship. Purser la Grange rallied the crew and helped to ensure they all got clear in the lifeboats. When the last boat was launched, la Grange carried an unconscious steward to the boat. Seven bombs damaged Pennland but she did not sink, so her destroyer escort HMS Griffin sank her by gunfire. Griffin also embarked survivors and took them to Crete, where they were joined an overcrowded cargo ship that took them to Alexandria.

== Awards ==
Captain van Dulken was awarded the British DSC in December 1941 and the Dutch Bronze Cross on 18 May 1942. In New York on 10 July 1942 the Dutch consul-general awarded Purser la Grange the Cross of Merit. Also in New York, in August 1942 Queen Wilhelmina of the Netherlands awarded Chief Officer van Beelen the Cross of Merit.

== Bibliography ==
- Dunn, Laurence (1964). Famous Liners of the Past: Belfast Built. London: Adlard Coles. p. 212. LCCN 65079744. OCLC 1101359.
- Harnack, Edwin P (1930) [1903]. All About Ships & Shipping (3rd ed.). London: Faber and Faber.
- Wilson, RM (1956). The Big Ships. London: Cassell & Co.
