= SS Westernland =

Steamship launched in 1917

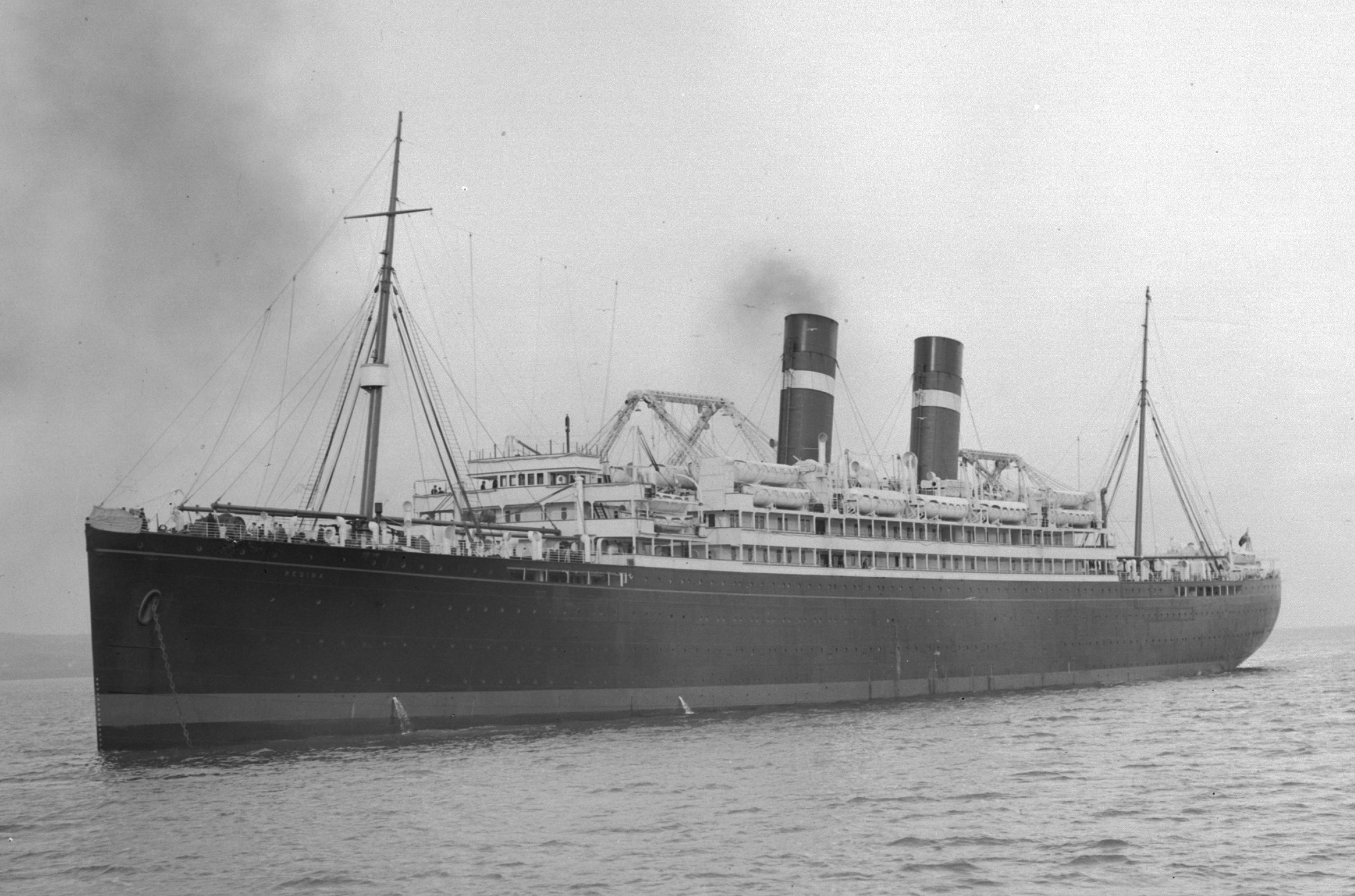
- Regina in Dominion Line livery

History
- Name: 1917: Regina; 1929: Westernland
- Owner: 1918: British & N Atlantic SN Co; 1920: F Leyland & Co; 1935: Red Star Line; 1939: Holland America Line; 1942: Admiralty; 1945: Ministry of War Transport; 1946: South Georgia Company
- Operator: 1918: British & N Atlantic SN Co; 1920: F Leyland & Co; 1925: White Star Line; 1930: Red Star Line; 1939: Holland America Line; 1942: (United Kingdom) Royal Navy; 1945: Cunard-White Star Line; 1946: Christian Salvesen
- Port of registry: 1918 (United Kingdom) Liverpool; 1935 (Nazi Germany) Hamburg; 1939 (Netherlands) Rotterdam; 1942 (United Kingdom); 1945 (United Kingdom) London
- Route: 1918–20: Liverpool – Boston; 1922–25: Liverpool – Quebec – Montreal; 1930–34: Antwerp – Le Havre – Southampton – New York; 1935–40: Antwerp – Southampton – New York
- Builder: Harland & Wolff, Govan
- Yard number: 454
- Laid down: 13 November 1913
- Launched: 19 April 1917
- Completed: September 1918
- Maiden voyage: March 1922
- In service: 1922
- Out of service: 1946
- Reclassified: 1940: troop ship; 1942: naval repair ship; 1943: destroyer depot ship
- Refit: 1920, 1926
- Identification: UK official number 140596; code letters JVMC (1918–1933); call sign DJNW (1934–1938); call sign PINV (from 1939–1942); pennant number F 87 (1942–1945); call sign BRVM (from 1945)
- Fate: Scrapped 1947

General characteristics
- Type: Ocean liner
- Tonnage: 1919: 16,314 GRT, 10,130 NRT; 1923: 16,500 GRT, 9,874 NRT; 1934: 16,231 GRT, 9,646 NRT; 1939: 16,479 GRT, 9,595 NRT; 1945: 16,289 GRT, 10,913 NRT
- Length: 575.3 ft (175.4 m)
- Beam: 67.8 ft (20.7 m)
- Depth: 41.2 ft (12.6 m)
- Decks: 4
- Propulsion: 3 × screws; 2 × triple-expansion engines; 1 × exhaust steam turbine
- Speed: 16 knots (30 km/h)
- Capacity: 1920: 600 cabin class, 1,700 third class; 1935: 486 tourist class; 50,480 cubic feet (1,429 m^{3}) refrigerated cargo
- Sensors & processing systems: by 1930: submarine signalling; wireless direction finding; by 1934: gyrocompass
- Notes: sister ships: Pennland, Doric

SS Westernland was a transatlantic ocean liner that was launched as Regina in Scotland in 1917, renamed Westernland in 1929 and was scrapped in 1947. She began her career as a troop ship repatriating US troops after the Armistice of 11 November 1918. In the Second World War, Westernland served as a troop ship, repair ship and destroyer depot ship.

In her career of almost three decades she was registered in the United Kingdom, Germany and the Netherlands and passed through the hands of at least eight different owners and operators, including several notable transatlantic shipping lines and the Royal Navy.

== Building ==
Dominion Line, a subsidiary of the International Mercantile Marine Company (IMM), ordered Regina in 1913. Harland & Wolff built her on slip A in its Govan yard, launching her on 19 April 1917. Her registered length was 575.3 ft (175.4 m), her beam was 67.8 ft (20.7 m) and her depth was 41.2 ft (12.6 m).

Although designed as an ocean liner, in the First World War she was completed as a troop ship with an incomplete superstructure, only one funnel and only one mast. On 26 October Harland & Wolff delivered her to the IMM's British and North Atlantic Steam Navigation Company. Her UK official number was 140596 and she was registered in Liverpool.

Regina had three screws. A pair of four-cylinder triple-expansion steam engines drove her port and starboard screws. Exhaust steam from their low-pressure cylinders powered a low-pressure steam turbine that drove her middle screw. Sources disagree as to the combined power of the three engines: one cites it as 9,460 ihp and another cites it as 12,200 ihp. Between them the three engines gave her a speed of 16 knots (30 km/h).

Harland & Wolff's Belfast yard built two sister ships for IMM: Pittsburgh (later named Pennland), laid down in 1913 and launched in 1920, and Doric, launched in 1922 and completed in 1923. Doric differed from Regina and Pittsburgh by having twin screws and pure turbine propulsion.

== Regina (1918–1929) ==
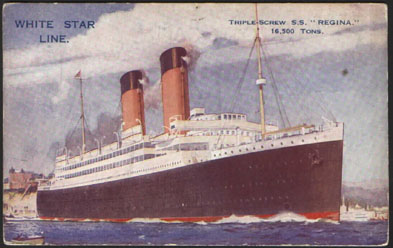
Regina in White Star Line livery

From December 1918 Regina sailed between Liverpool and Boston repatriating US troops and carrying emigrants. In August 1920 Regina arrived at Harland & Wolff's Belfast yard for completion as an ocean liner. Her upper promenade deck, second funnel and second mast were added and berths for 2,300 passengers: 600 cabin-class and 1,700 third class. Her holds also had 50,480 cubic feet (1,429 m^{3}) of refrigerated space for perishable cargo.

IMM transferred Regina to another of its subsidiaries, Frederick Leyland and Company. On 16 March 1922 began her first voyage for Leyland Line from Liverpool to Portland, Maine via Halifax, Nova Scotia. On 29 April she left Liverpool again, this time on her first voyage to Quebec and Montreal. She made her last Leyland Line voyage on this route in November 1925.

Leyland Line chartered Regina to White Star Line. Her first voyage for White Star Line began on 12 December 1925 from Liverpool to New York via Halifax. In June 1926 she was refitted for White Star Line with accommodation for cabin class, tourist class and third class passengers. Her last White Star Line voyage was in November 1929 from Liverpool to Montreal via Belfast, Glasgow and Quebec.

== Westernland in civilian service (1930–1940) ==
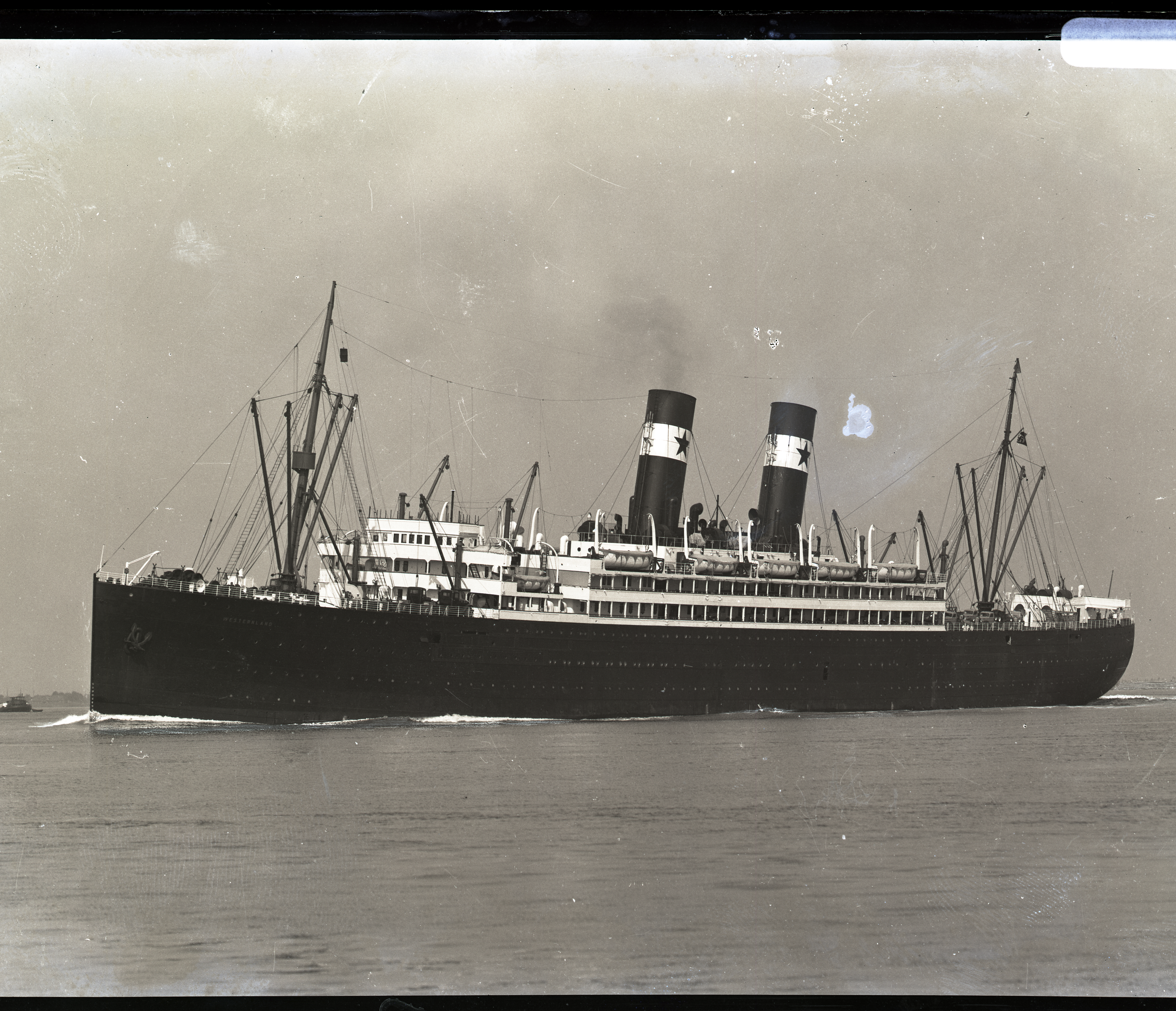
Westernland

At the end of 1929 Red Star Line chartered 'S.S. Regina' and renamed her 'Westernland' . Her first Red Star Line voyage began on 10 January 1930 from Antwerp to New York via Le Havre and Southampton. In 1934 IMM sold the Red Star Line to Arnold Bernstein. Her last Red Star Line voyage for IMM was on the same route and began on 30 November that year.

Bernstein registered Westernland in Hamburg and had her refitted to carry 486 tourist class passengers. Her route remained Antwerp – Southampton – New York. Her first Red Star voyage for Bernstein began on 29 March 1935, and her last began on 6 May 1939.

In 1939 Nazi Germany exiled Bernstein, and his German businesses were dissolved. Holland America Line bought the Red Star Line fleet including Westernland, which it registered in Rotterdam. That June she resumed service on the Antwerp – Southampton – New York route. On 15–18 October 1939 she was in Rotterdam, which was not one of her usual ports of call.

On 10 April 1940 Westernland left Antwerp for New York as usual. On 10 May Germany invaded the Netherlands and Belgium, and on the same day Westernland took refuge in Falmouth Bay.

== Westernland in war service (1940–1945) ==
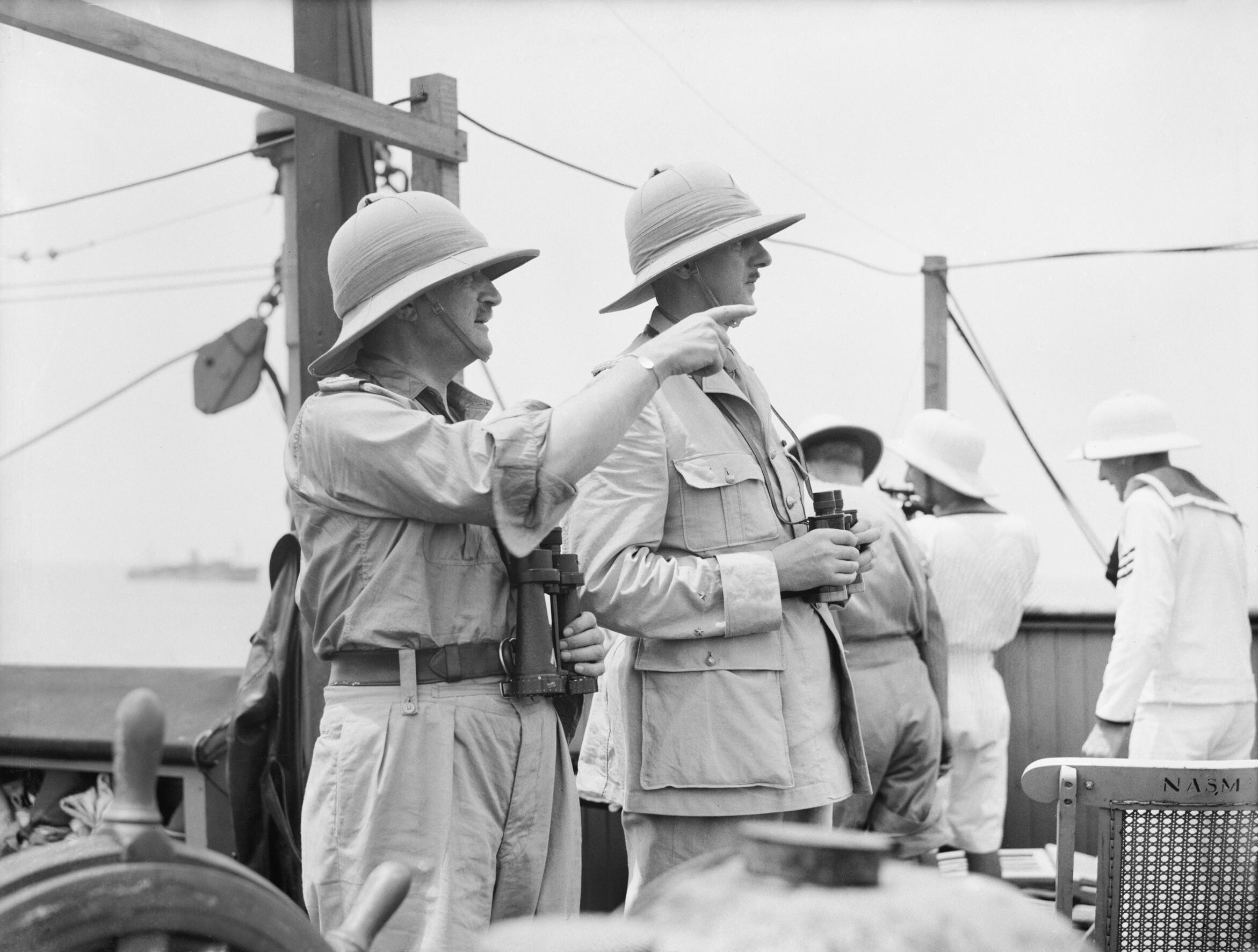
Generals Spears and de Gaulle aboard Westernland in September 1940

On 7 June 1940 Westernland left Falmouth Bay for Avonmouth. She shuttled between Avonmouth, Newport, Wales and Falmouth until 12 July. On 14 July Westernland reached Liverpool – the same day as her sister Pennland reached Liverpool from Halifax in Convoy HX 54.

On 31 August 1940 Westernland and Pennland left Liverpool under escort as part of the task force for the capture of Dakar. Westernland carried the Free French General Charles de Gaulle and reached Freetown in Sierra Leone on 20 September.

On 25 October 1940 Westernland left Freetown. She called at Takoradi on the Gold Coast and continued via Cape Town to Durban, where she arrived on 15 November. She spent most of the next 10 months as a troopship in the Indian Ocean, visiting Mombasa, Bombay, Suez, Colombo, Aden, Port Sudan, Massawa, Singapore, Fremantle and Sydney. When laden, Westernland carried more than 2,000 troops. The highest number recorded was 2,866 from Aden to Colombo in March 1942.

On 30 September 1942 Westernland left Durban and the Indian Ocean. She called at Cape Town, Pernambuco and Hampton Roads, and reached New York on 13 November. In November 1942 the Admiralty bought Westernland and had her converted into a repair ship. Her pennant number was F 87.

In December 1942 Westernland returned to Britain with Convoy HX 219. In January 1943 she was converted again, into a destroyer depot ship.

== Fate (1945–1947) ==
In 1945 Westernland was transferred to the Ministry of War Transport, who contracted Cunard-White Star Line to manage her. In October 1946 the South Georgia Company bought her, intended to have her converted into a whaling factory ship, and contracted Christian Salvesen to manage her.

However, the South Georgia Company abandoned its plan, and instead sold Westernland to Hughes, Bolckow and Company for scrap. On 1 August 1947 she arrived at Blyth, Northumberland to be broken up.

== Bibliography ==
- Harnack, Edwin P (1930) [1903]. All About Ships & Shipping (3rd ed.). London: Faber and Faber.
- Wilson, RM (1956). The Big Ships. London: Cassell & Co.
