= SS Vedic =

British ocean liner

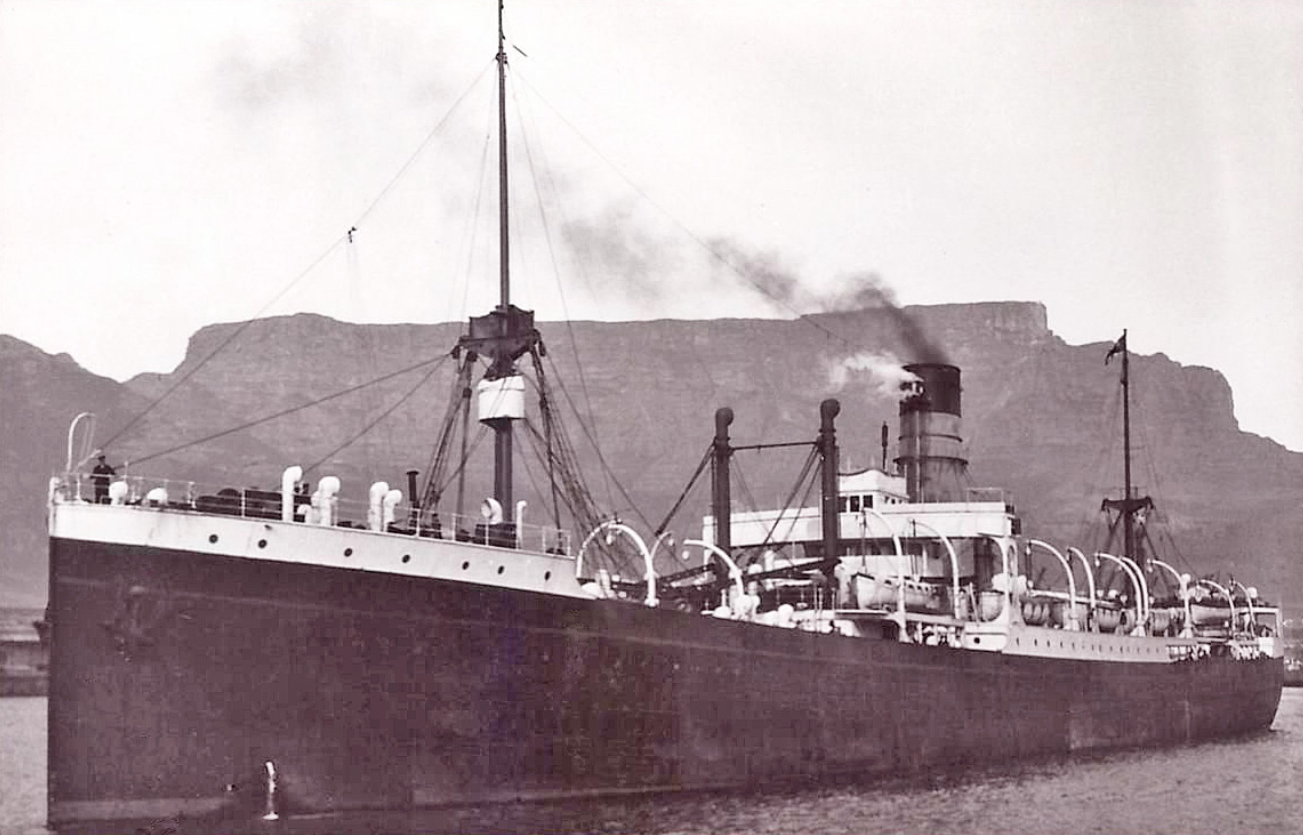

History

United Kingdom
- Name: SS Vedic
- Owner: White Star Line
- Operator: White Star Line
- Port of registry: Liverpool
- Route: Belfast-Clyde-Boston
- Builder: Harland & Wolff
- Yard number: 461
- Launched: 18 December 1917
- Completed: June 1918
- Maiden voyage: 11 July 1918
- In service: 10 July 1918
- Out of service: 1934
- Fate: Scrapped in 1934

General characteristics
- Type: Ocean liner
- Tonnage: 9,332 GRT
- Length: 460.5 ft (140.4 m)
- Beam: 58.3 ft (17.8 m)
- Draft: 37.3 ft (11.4 m)
- Decks: 3
- Installed power: 4 Steam turbines single reduction geared to 2 screw shafts
- Propulsion: Double propeller installation triple blades.
- Speed: 13.25 knots (24.54 km/h; 15.25 mph) (design service speed)
- Capacity: 1,250 third class
- Crew: 208

SS Vedic was an ocean liner for the White Star Line, constructed as a purpose-built immigrant transport ship in an all steerage configuration. Vedic had a career spanning 16 years from 1918 to 1934. Throughout her career, Vedic served as a troop transport at the tail end of the First World War alongside transporting immigrants from Europe to the United States and Canada, and from the United Kingdom to Australia.

== Construction ==
Vedic was ordered by the International Mercantile Marine Company (IMMC) on 1 January 1917. She was not built for a specific subsidiary of the IMMC, intending to be assigned to the line in which she was needed upon her completion.

Vedic was built by Harland & Wolff, known for building all prior White Star Line vessels. Vedics hull was constructed at Harland & Wolff's Govan yard, being towed to their main shipyard in Belfast for fitting out after launch.

== Design ==
Vedic was unique in being a one class vessel, made up entirely of third class for the purposes of immigrant transportation. The ship contained an array of 2, 4, and 6 berth staterooms, however she lacked the dormitory style berthing which was common in steerage in years past. The walls and ceilings of each stateroom were in white enamel, and each stateroom was furnished with a vitreous china bowl, with nickled fittings and a neatly designed metal water tank, with a water bottle, glass, and mirror. Additionally, each stateroom contained electric lighting and indirect ventilation.

Vedic was unique in that the majority of her accommodation was collapsible, easily dismantled to created expanded cargo spaces if passenger demand fell.

Vedic was praised in having exceptional amenities for steerage, including an abundance of lavatories with tiled floors, private stalls, and running water in wash basins for simple cleaning.

Vedic featured a cruiser stern, with a white superstructure, a short forecastle, with one funnel almost directly amidships and two masts with cargo derricks attached. Her hull was divided by 10 watertight bulkheads into 11 compartments, with a double bottom which could be used to store fresh water or ballast.

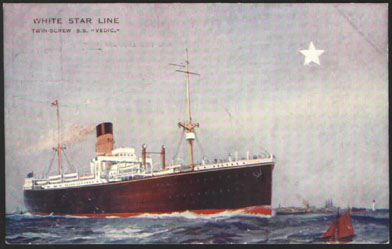
White Star Line postcard featuring Vedic

== Service history ==
Vedic set out on her maiden voyage on 11 July 1918, sailing from Belfast to Glasgow and Boston to begin transporting American troops to the war effort in Europe. Vedic would spend the remainder of the First World War as a troop transport, before beginning conversion to passenger service in April 1919. This conversion would be cut short, as later in the year Vedic would be requisitioned to repatriate British troops who had been aiding the White Army in the Russian Civil War.

The only major incident to occur throughout her service life occurred on the 19th of September 1919. Whilst repatriating British troops, Vedic ran aground near North Ronaldsay in the Orkney Islands. Vedic was assisted back to deep water by nearby warships and tug boats.

In 1920, Vedic was converted back to passenger service at Middlesbrough and would begin transporting immigrants from Liverpool to various ports in Canada. Due to a British joiners strike, her passenger quarters were not fully completed by the time she began passenger service. Shortly after, Vedic would begin sailing to Portland, Maine, in the winter and New York in the summer. In May 1922, Vedic would be transferred to a longer route, transporting immigrants from Bremen to Montreal in the summer and Halifax in the winter, via Southampton, and Cherbourg. Throughout this period, Vedic would earn the nickname, The Ship of Democracy.

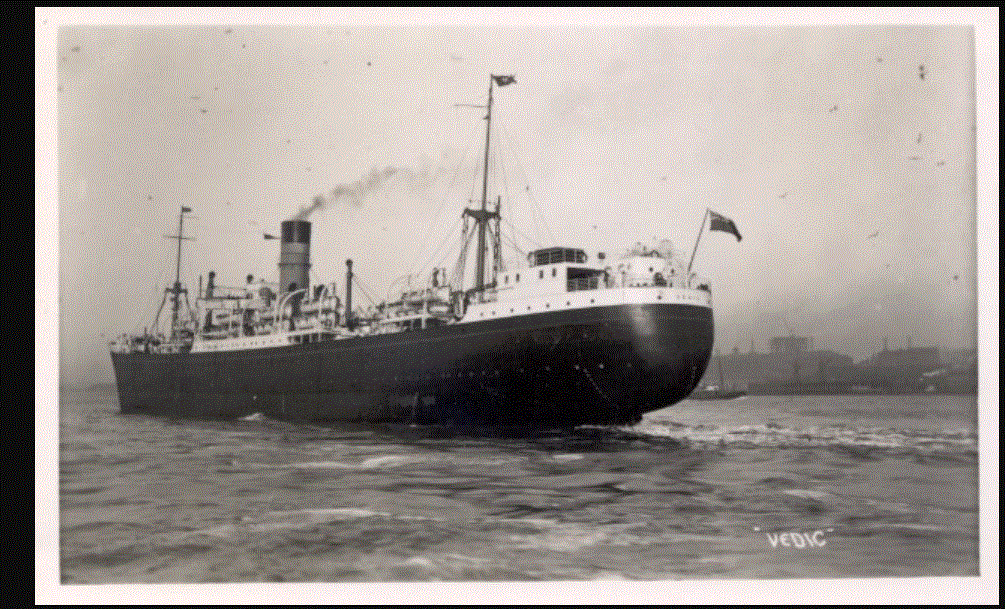
Vedic, seen from stern in early 1920s

In 1925, Vedic was once again transported to Belfast to be refit and transferred to the Australian immigrant trade. Her maiden voyage to Australia began on the 31st of October 1925, travelling via Capetown, stopping in various Australian ports, including Albany, Melbourne, Sydney, Newcastle, and Brisbane. This voyage was one of several chartered by the Salvation Army, with the purpose of bringing immigrants looking for a new life. This complement included over 300 young women to be employed as domestic servants, 200 young boys for employment on farms, alongside a small number of men with their wives and children.

== Retirement ==
In 1934, White Star Line merged with its rival, Cunard Line, forming Cunard-White Star, Ltd. The newly formed company began clearing its fleet of older vessels, which included the now 16 year old Vedic. She would become one of the first vessels sent to the breakers by the company, being pulled from service and transported to Rosyth for scrapping by Metal Industries Ltd., commencing on the 3rd of February 1934.
