= List of ships built by Harland & Wolff (1859–1929) =

The following is a list of ships that were built by Harland & Wolff, a heavy industrial company which specialises in shipbuilding and offshore construction, and is based in Belfast, Northern Ireland, as well as having had yards at Govan (1914–1963) and Greenock (1920–1928) in Scotland. The 1,600 ships are listed in order of the date of their launch. This list covers the period 1859–1929.

== 1850s ==
- SS Venetian (Yard No.1), cargo ship for J Bibby & Sons, launched 30 July 1859, completed 14 August 1859, renamed Landana in 1880 and later Tarapaca, wrecked in 1894.
- SS Sicilian (Yard No.2), cargo ship for J Bibby & Sons, launched 12 November 1859, completed 24 November 1859.

== 1860s ==
- SS Syrian (Yard No.3), cargo ship for J Bibby & Sons, launched 26 March 1860, completed 1 April 1860.
- Jane Porter (Yard No.5 - note Yard No.4 was never built), full-rigged ship for J. P. Corry & Co. Launched 1 September 1860, completed 15 September 1860.
- Miranda (Yard No.6), yacht for Mr T Yeats, launched 211 June 1860.
- SS Grecian (Yard No.7), cargo ship for J Bibby & Sons, launched 12 January 1861, completed 30 January 1861.
- Ballymurtagh (Yard No.10), steam wherry barge for Wicklow Mining Company, launched 25 September 1860.
- SS Italian (Yard No.8), cargo ship for J Bibby & Sons, launched 27 March 1861, completed 13 April 1861.
- SS Egyptian (Yard No.9), cargo ship for J Bibby & Sons, launched 23 July 1861, completed 11 August 1861.
- SS Dalmatian (Yard No.11), cargo ship for J Bibby & Sons, launched 19 November 1861, completed December 1861.
- SS Arabian (Yard No.12), cargo ship for J Bibby & Sons, launched 15 April 1862, completed 2 May 1862.
- SS Catalonian (Yard No.15), cargo ship for J Bibby & Sons, launched 15 July 1862, completed 2 August 1862.
- SS Persian (Yard No.13), cargo ship for J Bibby & Sons, launched 21 January 1863, completed February 1863.
- SS Castilian (Yard No.14), cargo ship for J Bibby & Sons, launched 10 May 1862, completed July 1862.
- Star of Erin (Yard No.16), sailing ship for J P Corry & Co, launched 9 October 1862, completed 11 October 1862.
- Recife (Yard No.17), sailing ship for Mr James Napier, launched 21 October 1862, completed November 1862.
- Worrall (Yard No.18), sailing ship for Mr James Worrall, launched December 1862, completed December 1862.
- Alexandra (Yard No.19), sailing ship for T&J Brocklebank, launched 7 April 1863, completed 8 June 1863.
- Star of Denmark (Yard No.20), sailing ship for JP Corry & Co, launched 19 June 1863, completed June 1863.
- Victoria Nyanza (Yard No.21), sailing ship for Joshua Prouse & Co, Launched 15 August 1863, completed August 1863.
- Palestine (Yard No.22), sailing ship for WH Tindall, launched 13 October 1863.
- Olano (Yard No.23), sailing ship for Larrinaga Steamship Co, launched 29 September 1863.
- Star of Scotia (Yard No.24), sailing ship for JP Corry & Co, launched January 1864, completed January 1864.
- ST Kitty of Coleraine (Yard No.25), tug for Lower Bann Steamboat Co, launched 7 October 1863, completed 30 October 1863.
- SS Waipara (Yard No.26), cargo ship for J Ritchie & Co, launched October 1863, completed 28 November 1863.
- Baroda (Yard No.27), sailing ship for T&J Brocklebank, launched 23 April 1864.
- Volador (Yard No.28), sailing ship for G Lomer, launched April 1864, completed 20 April 1864.
- Star of Albion (Yard No.29), sailing ship for JP Corry & Co, launched 20 July 1864.
- Dharwar (Yard No.30), sailing ship for Iron Ship Company, launched 3 September 1864, completed September 1864.
- SS Douro (Yard No.31), cargo ship for J Bibby & Sons, launched November 1864, completed 21 November 1864.
- British Peer (Yard No.32), sailing ship for British Shipping Company, launched 31 January 1865, completed February 1865.
- SS Sesostris (Yard No.33), cargo ship for James Moss & Co, launched 27 May 1865.
- Salamis (Yard No.34), barge for James Moss & Co, completed 22 May 1865
- Sestris (Yard No.35), barge for James Moss & Co, completed 14 June 1865
- (unknown name) (Yard No.36), barge for James Moss & Co, completed 1865
- Pilot (Yard No.37), schooner for GW Wolff, Launched 21 August 1865.
- PS Fairy Queen (Yard No.38), paddle steamer for Rock Ferry Co, launched 7 September 1865.
- PS Gypsy Queen (Yard No.39), paddle steamer for Rock Ferry Co, launched 8 September 1865.
- Boyne (Yard No.40), sailing ship for WH Tindall, launched 18 September 1865, completed September 1865.
- Annie Sharp (Yard No.41), sailing ship for RG Sharp, launched November 1865.
- Duddon (Yard No.42), paddle tug for Hodbarrow Mining Co, launched 9 November 1865.
- Guarani (Yard No.43), cargo ship for J Dalglish, launched 15 November 1865.
- Candahar, sailing ship for T&J Brocklebank, launched 1 May 1866, completed May 1866.
- Tenasserim, sailing ship for T&J Brocklebank, launched 30 August 1866, completed September 1866.
- SS Istrian, cargo ship for J Bibby & Sons, launched 9 March 1867, completed 21 April 1867, scrapped 1895.
- SS Iberian, cargo ship for J Bibby & Sons, launched 4 June 1867, completed July 1867. Wrecked in 1885.
- SS Black Diamond, collier for P Evans & Co, launched 8 July 1867.
- SS Corsanegetto, collier for MA Corsanego, launched 16 August 1867.
- Illyrian, cargo ship for J Bibby & Sons, launched 31 August 1867, completed 25 September 1867. Wrecked in 1884.
- Broughton, sailing ship for Ismay, Imrie & Co, launched 25 January 1868.
- HMS Lynx, Beacon-class gunboat for British Admiralty, launched 25 April 1868, completed 12 June 1868, sold in 1888.
- Star of Persia, sailing ship for JP Corry & Co, launched 23 June 1868.
- Woodlawn, schooner for S Moreland, launched 21 July 1868.
- SS Hebe, steam lighter for W&J Phillips, launched 1 August 1868.
- Star of Greece, sailing ship for JP Corry & Co, launched 19 September 1868.
- Juliet, sailing ship for CT Bowring, launched 1 January 1869, completed January 1869.
- SS Elaine, coaster for F Lervik & Co, launched 16 February 1869, completed 31 May 1869.
- SS Carry, steam lighter for W Gossage & Co, launched 31 March 1869, completed April 1869.
- Lady Cairns, sailing ship for Harland and Wolff, launched 24 April 1869, completed April 1869.
- SS Bavarian, cargo ship for J Bibby & Sons, launched 7 October 1869, completed 5 November 1869.
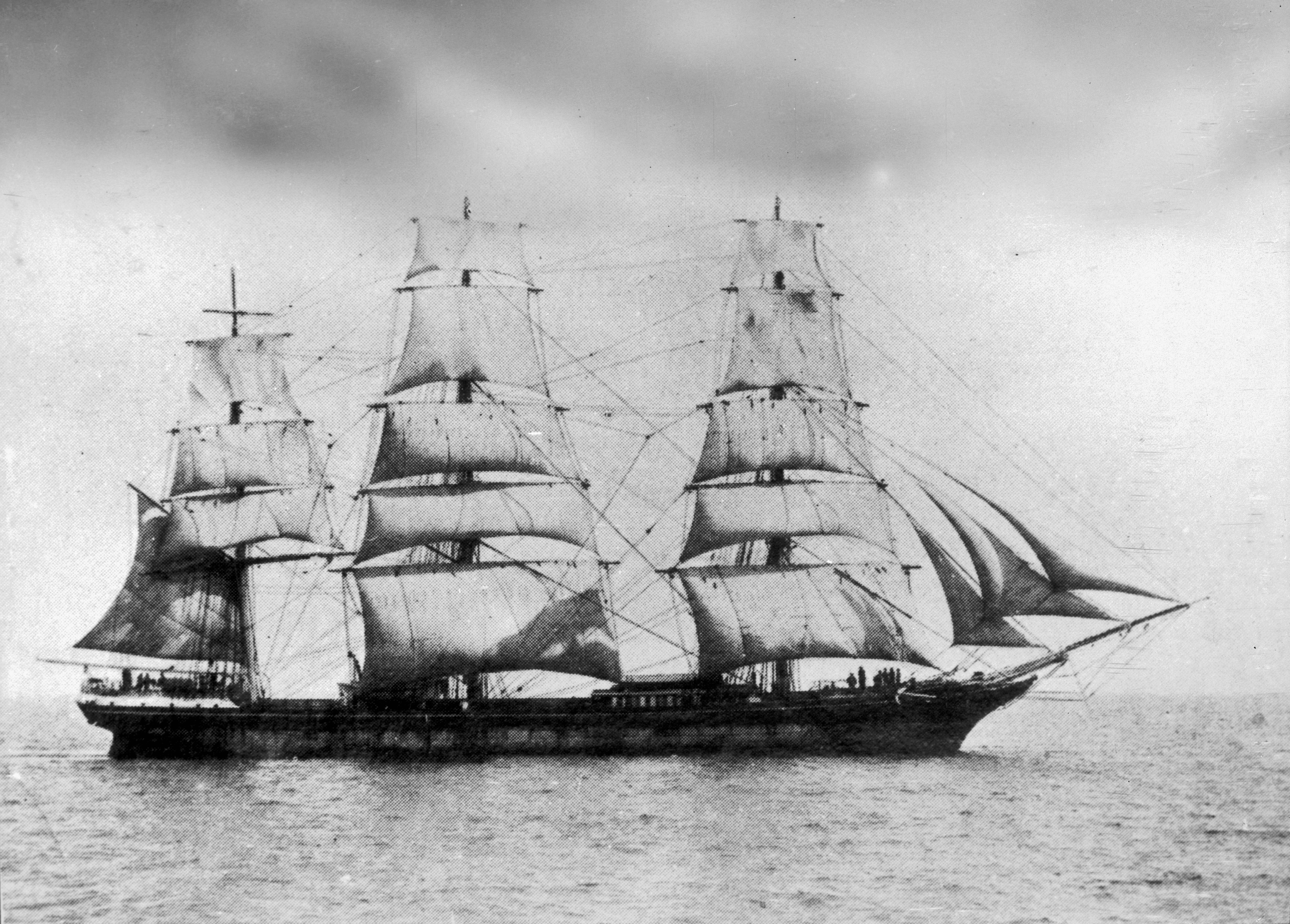
Dharwar

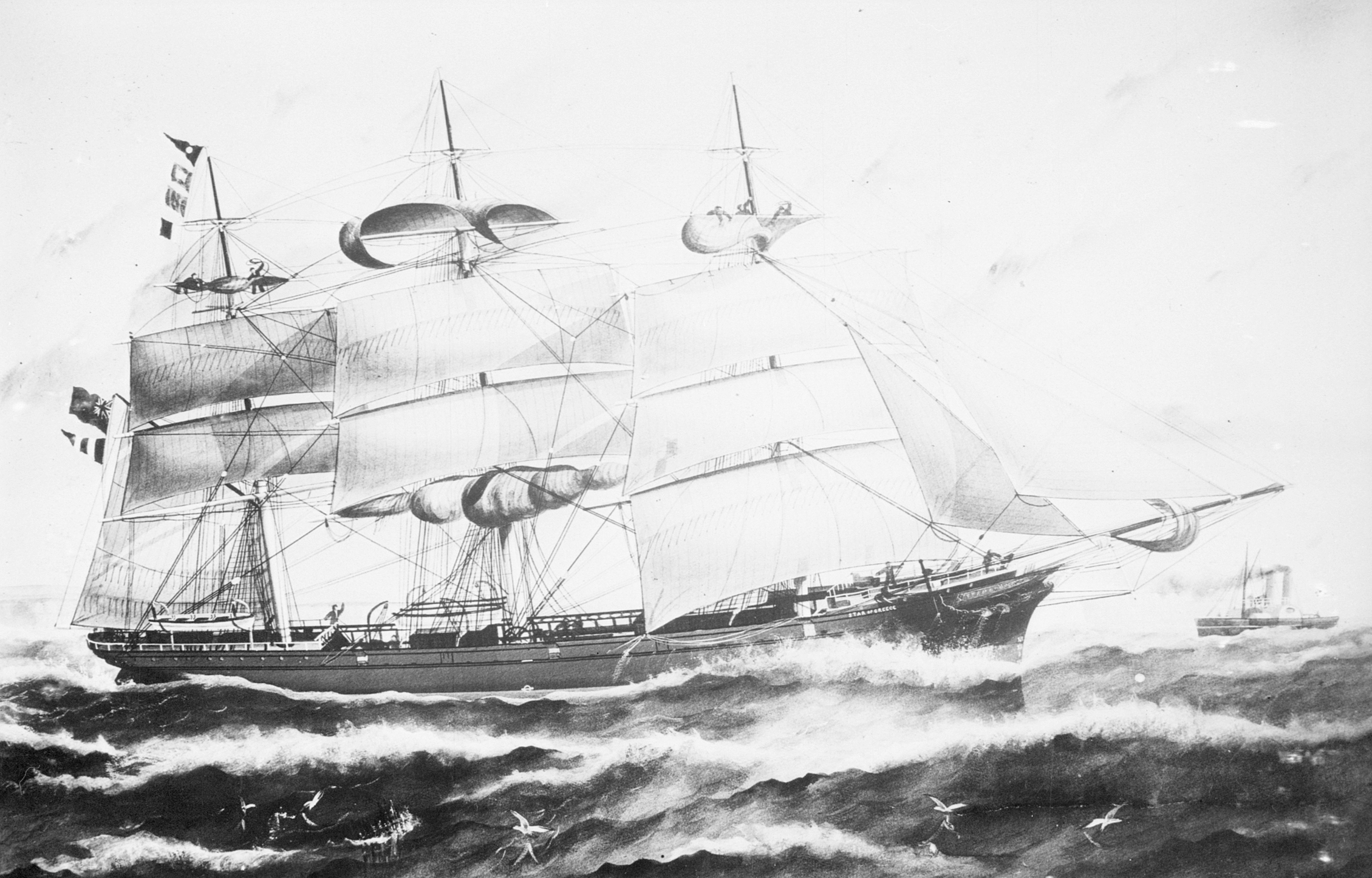
Star of Greece

== 1870s ==
- SS Historian, cargo ship for T&J Harrison, launched 5 January 1870, completed 9 March 1870.
- SS Bulgarian, cargo ship for J Bibby & Sons, launched 17 March 1870, completed 20 March 1870.
- SS Bohemian, cargo ship for J Bibby & Sons, launched 16 April 1870, completed 29 May 1870.
- RMS Oceanic, (Yard No. 73) passenger ship for White Star Line, launched 27 August 1870, completed 24 February 1871, maiden voyage 2 March 1871, scrapped 1896 The White Star Line's first liner.
- SS Camel, cargo ship for Harland and Wolff, launched 7 September 1870, completed 17 September 1870.
- RMS Atlantic, (Yard No. 74) passenger ship for White Star Line, launched 26 November 1870, completed 3 June 1871, maiden voyage 8 June 1871, sank 1 April 1873, Nova Scotia.
- SS Baltic, (Yard No. 75) passenger ship for White Star Line, launched 8 March 1871, completed 2 September 1871, maiden voyage 14 September 1871, renamed Veendam, sank 6 February 1898.
- SS Republic, (Yard No. 76) passenger ship for White Star Line, launched 4 July 1871, completed 21 January 1872, maiden voyage 1 February 1872, renamed Maasdam, Vittoria and Citta di Napoli, scrapped in 1910.
- SS Adriatic, (Yard No. 77) passenger ship for White Star Line, launched 17 October 1871, completed 31 March 1872, maiden voyage 11 April 1872, scrapped 1899.
- Star of Germany, (Yard No. 78) sailing ship for JP Corry & Co, launched on 11 March 1872, completed 20 May 1872.
- SS Celtic, (Yard No. 79) passenger ship for White Star Line, launched 18 June 1872, completed 17 October 1872, maiden voyage 24 October 1872, renamed Amerika, scrapped in 1898.
- SS Ferry No 1, river ferry for Belfast Harbour Commissioners, launched 27 June 1872, completed 1 October 1872.
- SS Gaelic, (Yard No. 80) passenger ship for White Star Line, launched 21 September 1872, completed 7 January 1873, maiden voyage 29 January 1873, renamed Hugo, scrapped in 1896.
- SS Belgic, (Yard No. 81) passenger ship for White Star Line, launched 14 January 1873, completed 29 March 1873, maiden voyage 16 April 1873, renamed Goefredo, wrecked 26 February 1884.
- Star of Bengal, (Yard No. 82) sailing ship for JP Corry & Co, launched 3 January 1874, completed 7 March 1874.
- SS Britannic, (Yard No. 83) passenger ship for White Star Line, launched 3 February 1874, completed 6 June 1874, maiden voyage 25 June 1874, scrapped 1903.
- SS Germanic, (Yard No. 85) passenger ship for White Star Line, launched 15 July 1874, completed 24 April 1875, maiden voyage 30 May 1875, renamed Ottawa 1905, Gul Djemal 1910 and Gulcemal 1928, scrapped 1950.
- Belfast, sailing ship for T&J Brocklebank, launched 15 August 1874, completed 26 October 1874.
- Star of Russia, sailing ship for JP Corry & Co, launched 12 December 1874, completed 12 February 1875.
- Aglaia, barque for Workman Bros, launched 10 March 1875, completed 13 April 1875.
- Majestic, sailing ship for T&J Brocklebank, launched 5 May 1875, completed 24 June 1875, renamed Lautaro 1904, sold 1954
- East Croft, sailing ship for WJ Gambles, launched 23 June 1875, completed 10 August 1875.
- Connaught Ranger, sailing ship for JG McCormick, launched 17 August 1875, completed 23 October 1875.
- SS Millie, river boat for W Gossage & Sons, completed 27 July 1875.
- Katie, river boat for W Gossage & Sons, launched 13 August 1875.
- Fiji, sailing ship for WJ Myers, launched 21 September 1875, completed 29 October 1875.
- Pizarro, sailing ship for WJ Myers, launched December 1875, completed 20 December 1875.
- PS Princess Beatrice, paddle steamer for Larne & Stranraer ferry company, launched 4 November 1875, completed 4 February 1876.
- SS Thursby, cargo ship for W Thursby, launched 19 February 1876, completed 16 July 1876.
- The Lagan, steam barge for A Guinness & Sons, launched 12 February 1876, completed 22 February 1876.
- Gladys, yacht for N. Mathieson, launched 11 May 1876.
- Mousmie, yacht for P O'Connor, launched 14 November 1876.
- E J Harland, sailing ship for Thomas Dixon & Co, launched 20 April 1876, completed 1 June 1876.
- Gladys, schooner for N Matheson, launched May 1876, completed May 1876.
- Thurland Castle, sailing ship for Lancaster Shipowners Company, launched 22 July 1876, completed 20 September 1876.
- Steelfield, sailing ship for RC McNaughton & Co, launched 2 December 1876, completed 1 January 1877.
- Slieve More, jute clipper for WP Sinclair & Co, launched 10 February 1877, completed 24 March 1877.
- Slieve Bawn, jute clipper for WP Sinclair & Co, launched 31 March 1877, completed 12 May 1877.
- Lord Cairns, sailing ship for T Doxon Hughes & Co, launched 12 May 1877.
- Star of Italy, sailing ship for JP Corry & Co, launched 26 July 1877, completed 18 October 1877.
- Star of France, sailing ship for JP Corry & Co, launched 21 November 1877, completed 5 January 1878.
- Slieve Roe, sailing ship for WP Sinclair & Co, launched 2 February 1878, completed 16 March 1878.
- River Lagan, sailing ship for R Neill & Sons, launched 30 June 1878, completed 14 August 1878.
- HMS Hecla, depot ship for British Admiralty, launched 7 March 1878, completed 24 August 1878, modernised 1912, sold 1926.
- SS British Empire, passenger ship for British Shipowners Ltd, launched 18 May 1878, completed 10 August 1878.
- Faugh-a-Ballagh, steam barge for Dublin Harbour Board, launched 22 May 1878, completed 21 June 1878.
- G W Wolff, sailing ship for S Lawther & Co, launched 28 September 1878, completed 25 October 1878.
- SS Nubia, cargo ship for African Steamship Company, launched 9 November 1878, completed 12 February 1879.
- SS Shahjehan, cargo ship for Asiatic Steamship Co, launched 24 December 1878, completed 22 February 1879.
- SS Shahzada, cargo ship for Asiatic Steamship Co, launched 29 January 1879, completed 14 April 1879.
- SS Maharaja, cargo ship for Asiatic Steamship Co, launched 26 March 1879, completed 3 May 1879.
- SS Maharani, cargo ship for Asiatic Steamship Co, launched 26 April 1879, completed 5 June 1879.
- SS Fair Head, cargo ship for Ulster Steamship Co, launched 24 May 1879, completed 3 July 1879.
- British Crown, passenger ship for British Shipowners Ltd, launched 2 August 1879, completed 8 October 1879, maiden voyage 15 October 1879, renamed Amsterdam 1887.
- SS Galgorm Castle, cargo ship for A McMullan, launched June 1879, completed 21 August 1879.
- Lord Dufferin, sailing ship for Thomas Dixon & Co, launched 1 October 1879, completed 14 November 1879.
- SS Holmhurst, cargo ship for JH Thursley & Co, launched 5 November 1870, completed 12 December 1879.
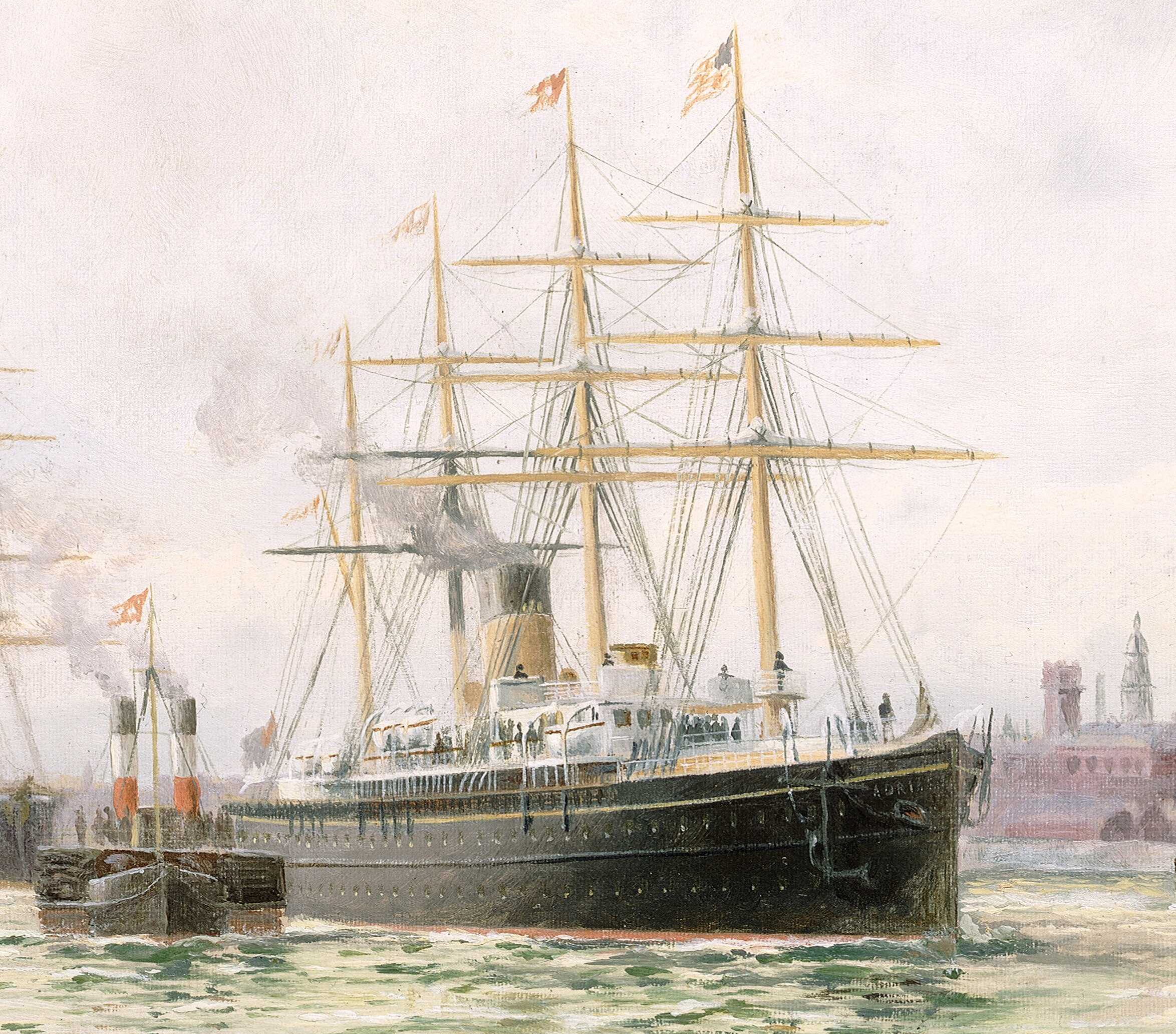
Adriatic

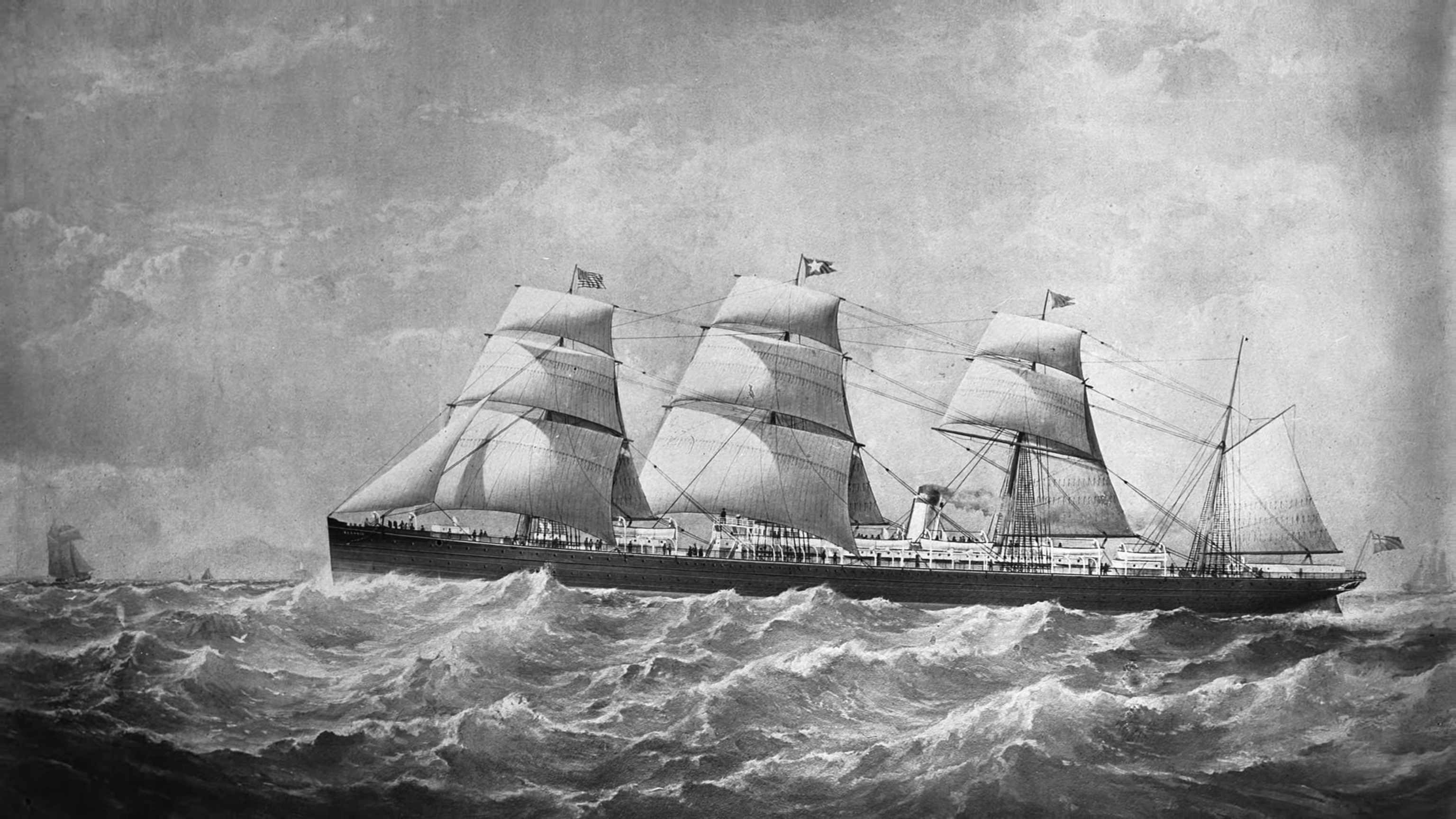
RMS Atlantic

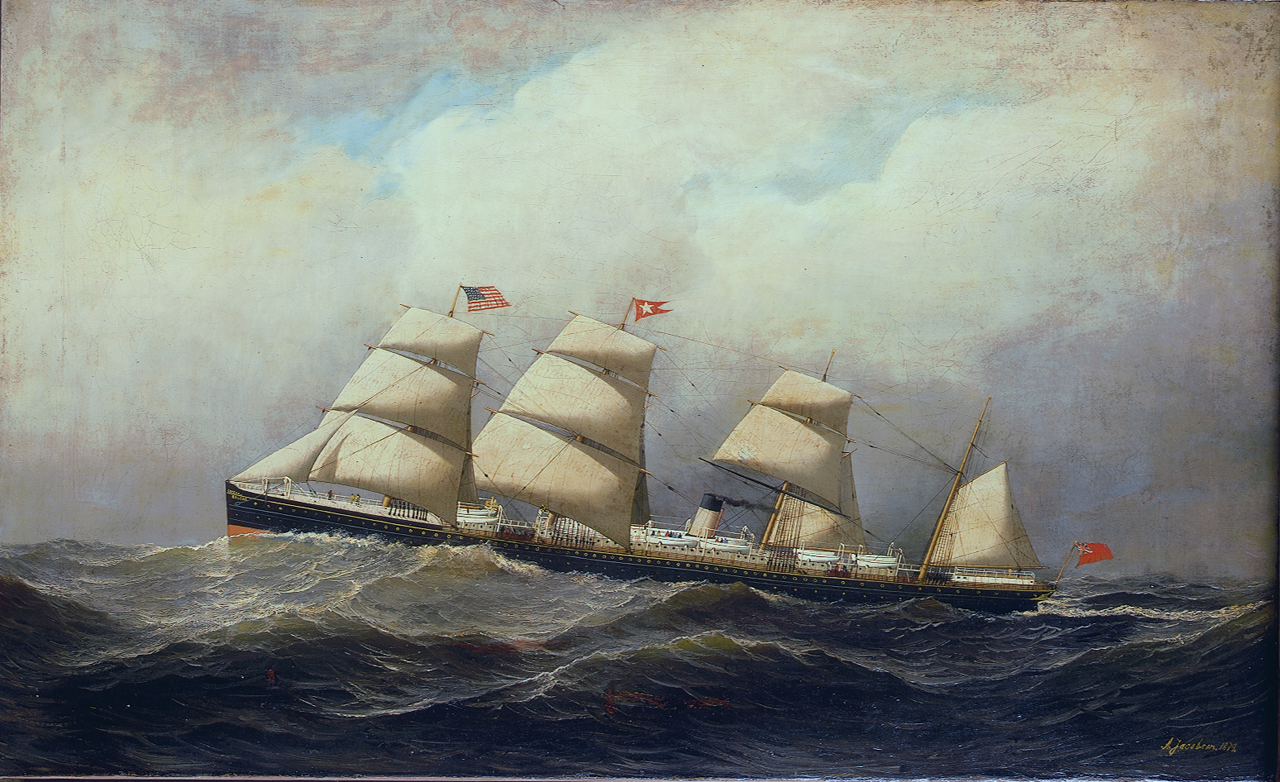
Baltic

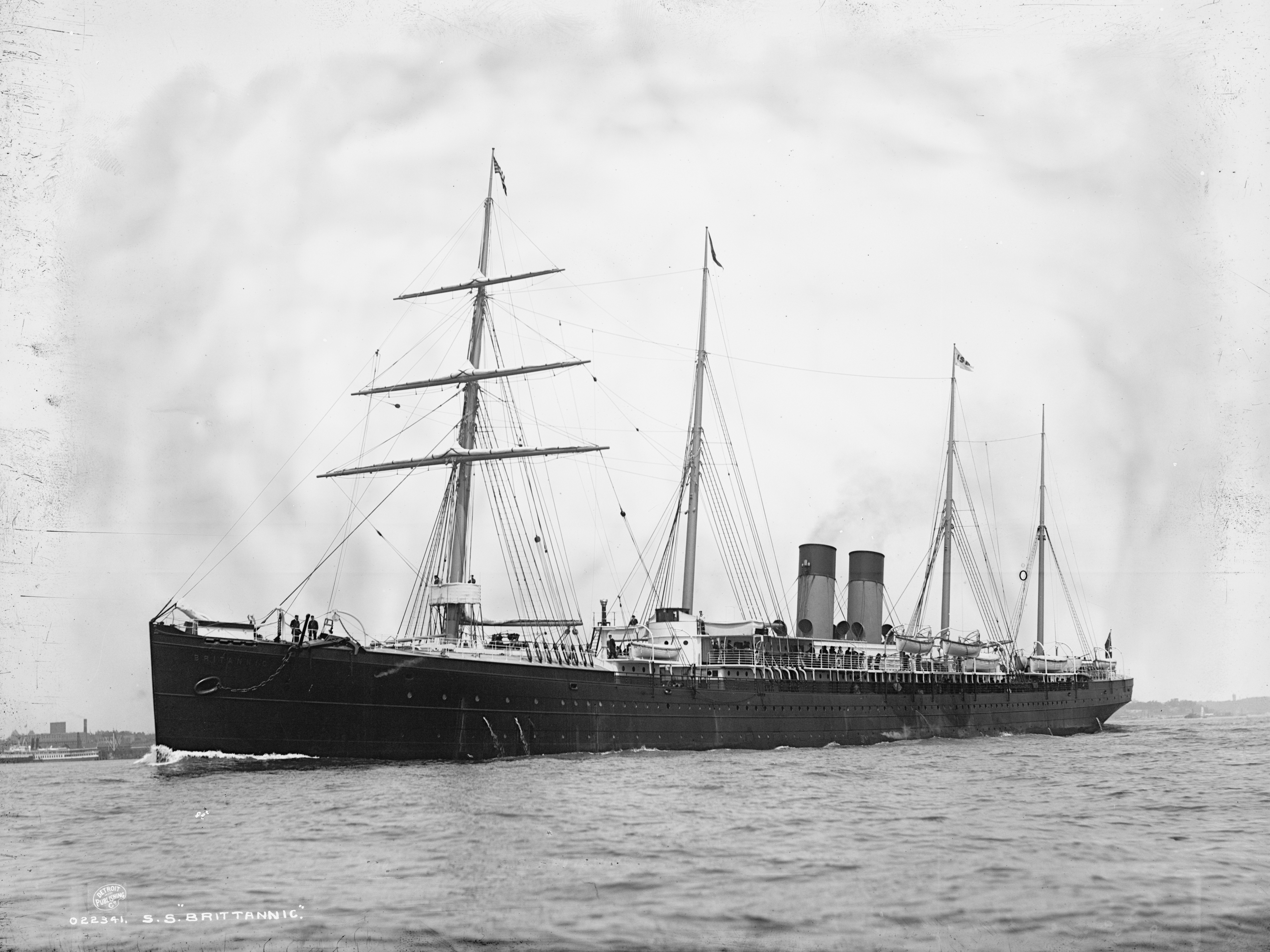
Britannic

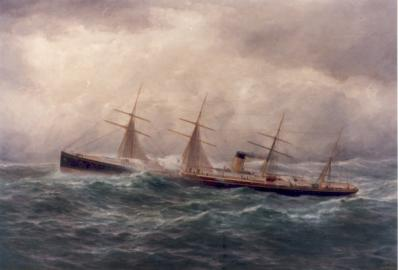
Celtic

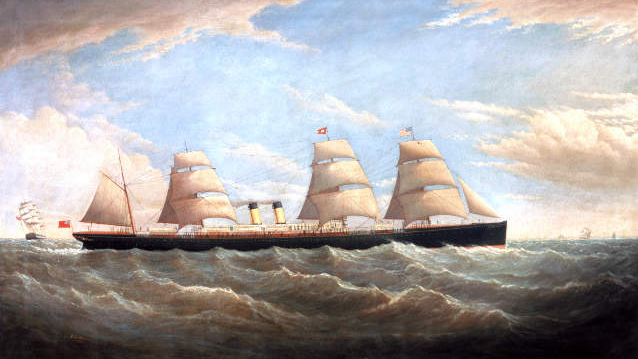
Germanic

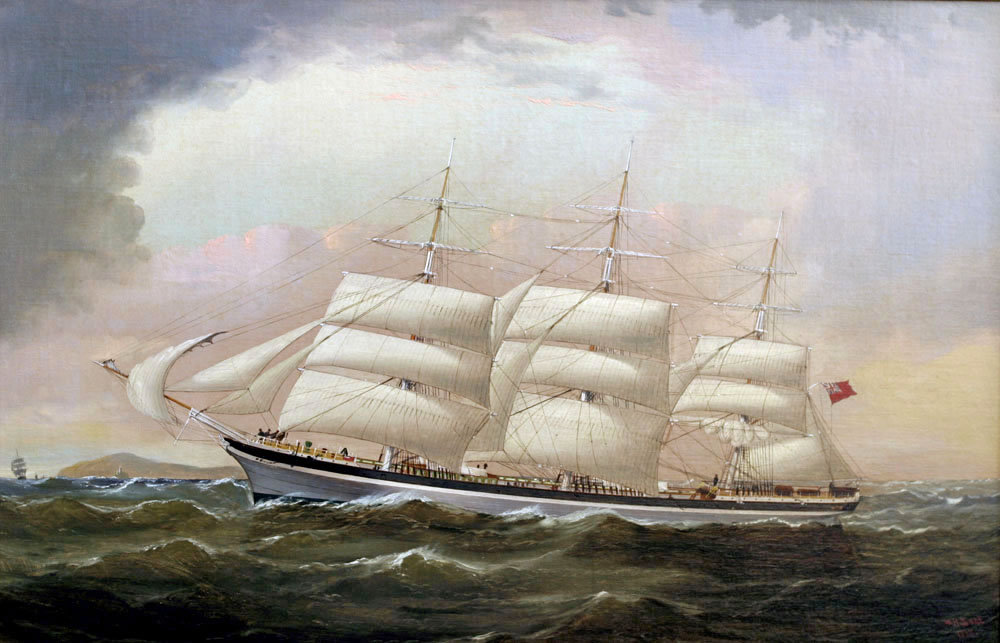
Majestic

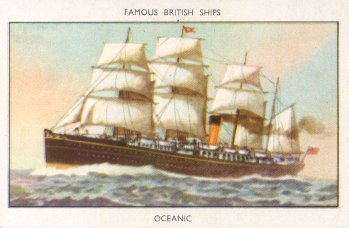
RMS Oceanic

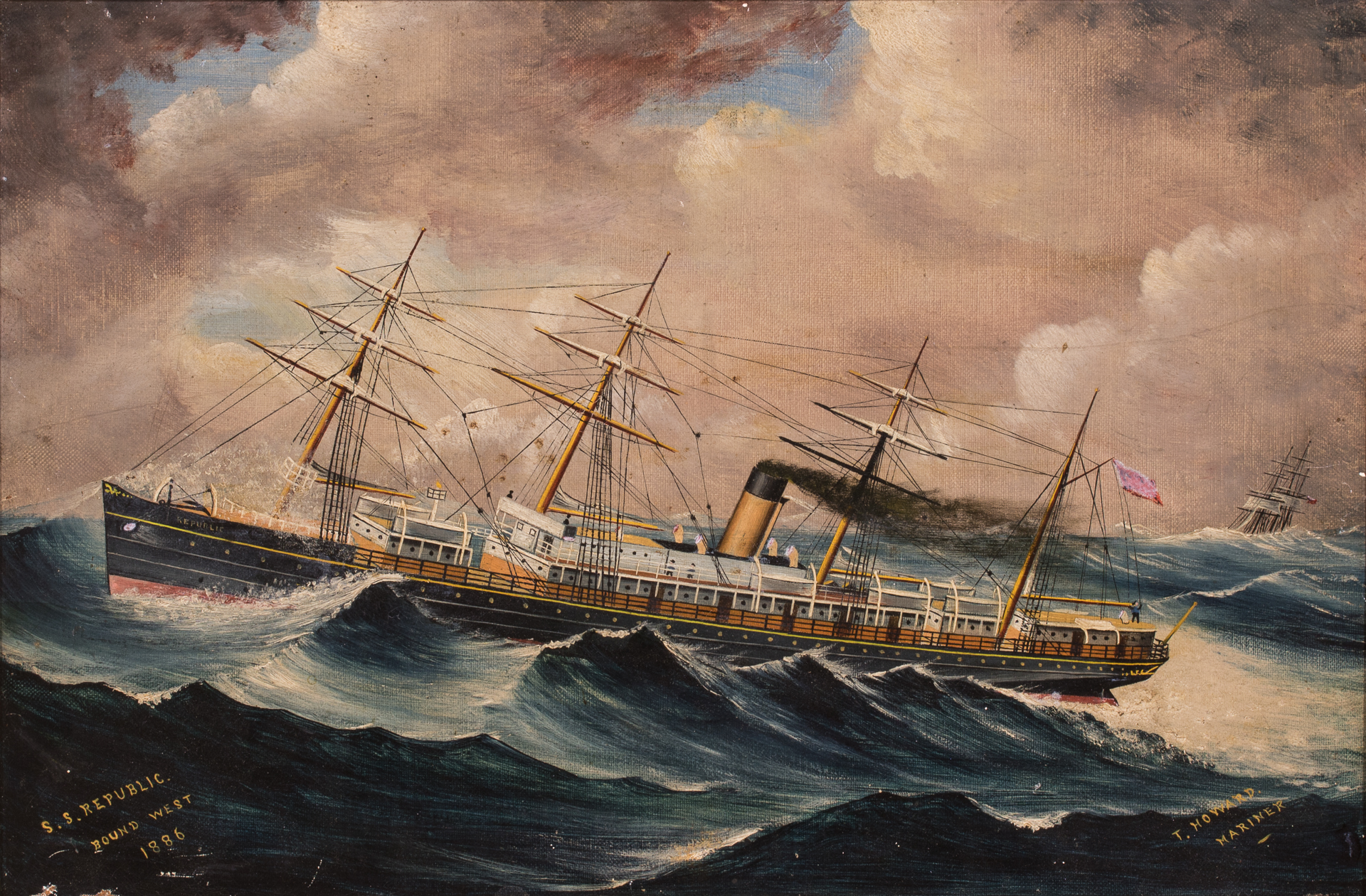
Republic

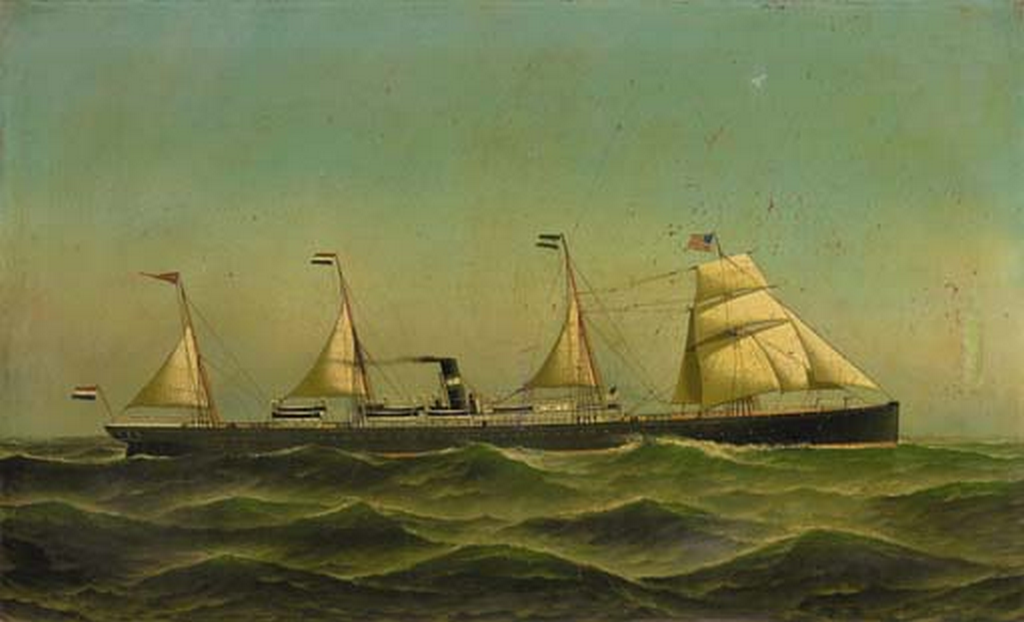
Rotterdam

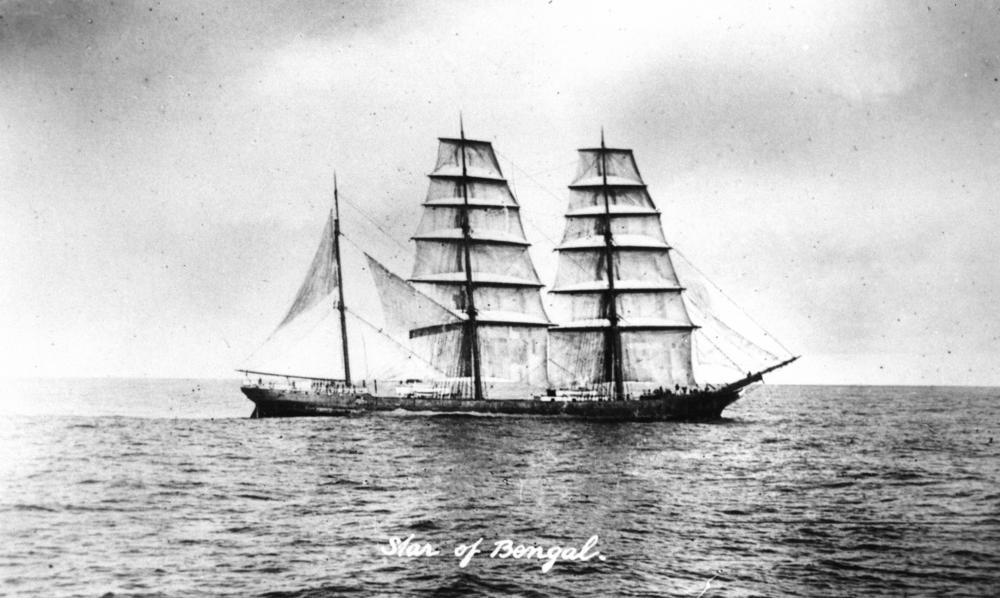
Star of Bengal

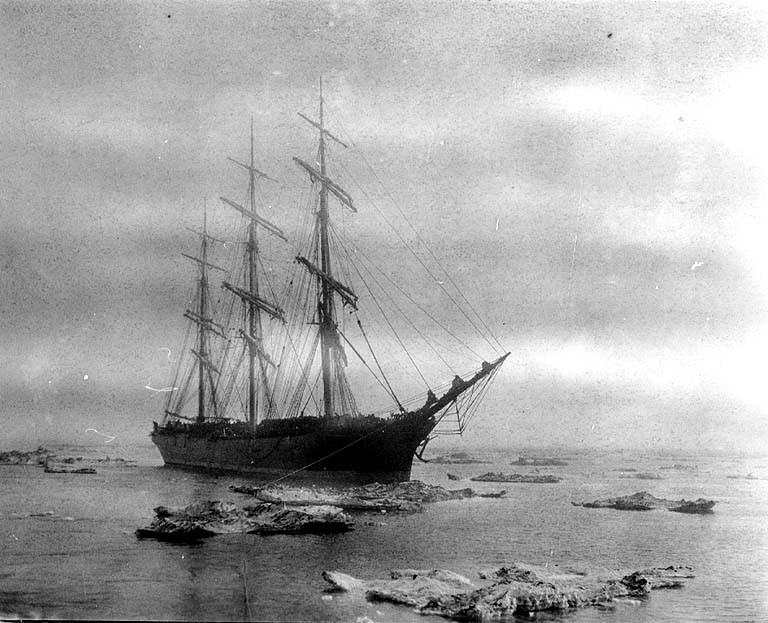
Star of France

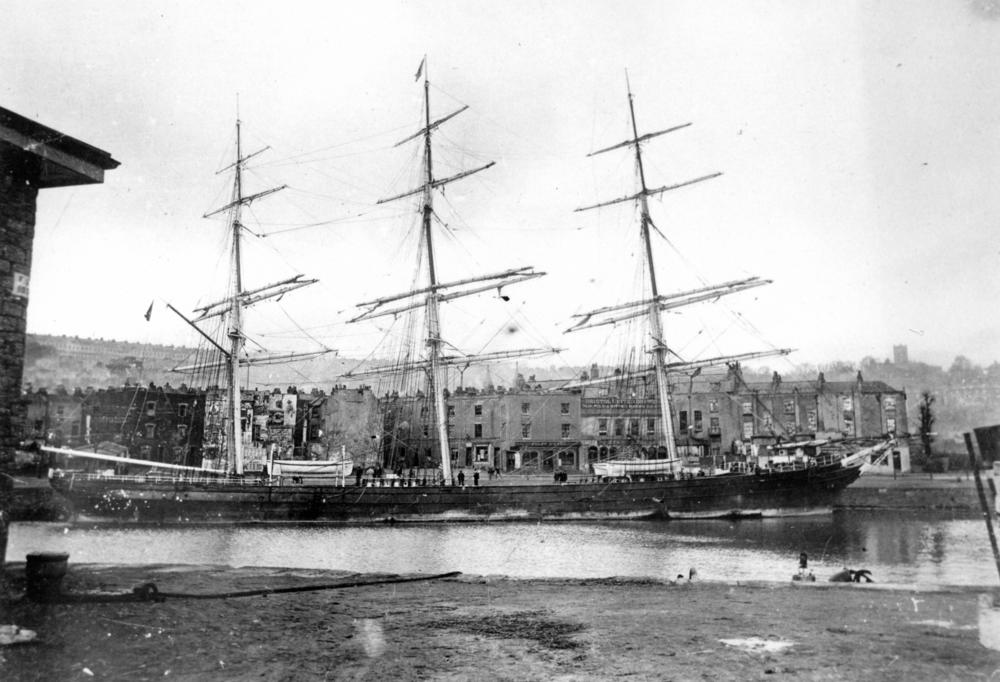
Star of Germany

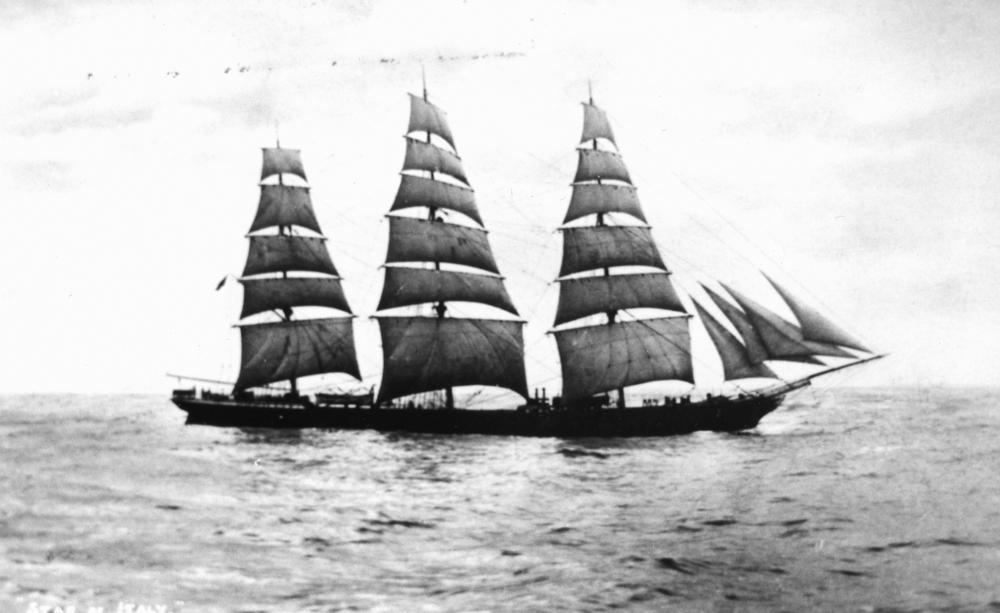
Star of Italy

== 1880s ==
- Dawpool, sailing ship for North Western Shipping Company, launched 1 January 1880, completed 24 January 1880.
- HMS Algerine, gun boat for British Admiralty, launched 6 November 1880, completed 12 December 1880, sold in 1892.
- SS Peshwa, cargo ship for Turner & Co, launched 27 March 1880, completed 9 June 1880.
- SS Winnebah, steamship for South African Steamship Co, launched 30 March 1880.
- SS White Head, cargo ship for Ulster Steamship Co, launched 5 May 1880.
- SS Rosetta, passenger ship for P&O, launched 27 May 1880, completed 27 August 1880.
- Woodhopper, hopper barge for White Star Line, completed 18 June 1880.
- British Merchant, sailing ship for British Shipowners Ltd, launched 25 August 1880, completed 7 October 1880.
- SS British Queen, passenger ship for British Shipowners Ltd, launched 4 November 1880, completed 15 January 1881, maiden voyage 31 January 1881, renamed Onega 1915, sunk by torpedo 1918.
- SS Black Head, cargo ship for Ulster Steamship Co, launched 15 January 1881, completed 14 March 1881.
- SS British King, passenger ship for British Shipowners Ltd, launched 22 January 1881, completed 29 March 1881.
- SS Arabic, cargo ship for White Star Line, launched 30 April 1881, completed 12 August 1881, maiden voyage 10 September 1881, renamed Spaarndam 1890, scrapped 1901
- SS Coptic, cargo ship for White Star Line, launched 10 August 1881, completed 9 November 1881, maiden voyage 16 November 1881, renamed Persia 1906 and Persia Maru 1915, scrapped 1926
- SS Akassa, cargo ship for African Steamship Co, launched 15 June 1881, completed 17 August 1881.
- SS Shannon, passenger ship for P&O, launched 6 October 1881, completed 5 January 1882.
- Garfield, sailing ship for North Western Shipping Co, launched 7 January 1882, completed 19 February 1882.
- SS British Prince, passenger ship for British Shipowners Ltd, launched 4 February 1882, completed 4 April 1882.
- SS Mandingo, cargo ship for African Steamship Co, launched 18 March 1882, completed 6 May 1882.
- Lord Downshire, sailing ship for Thomas Dixon & Sons, launched 29 April 1882, completed 31 May 1882.
- Walter H. Wilson, sailing ship for S Lawther & Co, launched 6 July 1882, completed 18 August 1882.
- SS Yucatan, cargo ship for West India Shipping Co, launched 15 June 1882, completed 19 August 1882.
- SS British Princess, passenger ship for British Shipowners Ltd, launched 14 December 1882, completed 19 April 1883.
- SS Ionic, cargo ship for White Star Line, launched 11 January 1883, completed 28 March 1883, maiden voyage April 1884, renamed Sophocles 1900, scrapped 1908.
- SS Doric, passenger ship for White Star Line, launched 10 March 1883, completed 4 July 1883, maiden voyage 6 January 1885, renamed Asia 1906, wrecked 23 April 1911.
- Fingal, sailing ship for R Martin & Co, launched 11 April 1883, completed 2 June 1883.
- W J Pirrie, sailing ship for S Lawther & Co, launched 26 May 1883, completed 29 July 1883.
- Lord Wolseley, sailing ship for Irish Shipowners Ltd, launched 21 July 1883, completed 6 September 1883.
- SS Dundela, cargo ship for Harland and Wolff, launched 4 August 1883, completed 13 November 1883.
- SS Dunluce, cargo ship for Harland and Wolff, launched 1 September 1883, completed 3 November 1883.
- SS La Nevera, cargo ship for River Plate Co, launched 10 February 1883, completed 26 March 1884.
- SS Niger, cargo ship for African Steamship Co, launched 23 June 1883, completed 3 August 1883.
- SS Dynamic, ferry for Belfast Steamship Company, launched 19 September 1883, completed 13 December 1883.
- SS Guido, cargo ship for GH Fletcher, launched 17 October 1883, completed 12 January 1884.
- Bay of Panama, sailing ship for J Bullock & Co, launched 14 November 1883, completed 12 January 1884.
- SS Texan, cargo ship for West India Shipping Co, launched 29 December 1883, completed 15 March 1884.
- SS Horn Head, cargo ship for Ulster Steamship Co, launched 1 March 1884, completed 24 May 1884.
- SS Lord O'Neill, cargo ship for Irish Shipowners Ltd, launched 17 May 1884, completed 12 July 1884.
- SS Floridian, cargo ship for West India Shipping Co, launched 12 April 1884, completed 16 August 1884.
- SS Benin, cargo ship for African Steamship Co, launched 7 June 1884, completed 24 July 1884.
- SS Lord Lansdowne, cargo ship for Irish Shipowners Ltd, launched 26 July 1884, completed 15 September 1884.
- SS Belgic, cargo ship for White Star Line, launched 3 January 1885, completed 7 July 1885, maiden voyage 30 July 1885, renamed Mohawk 1899, scrapped 1903.
- RMS Gaelic, cargo ship for White Star Line, launched 28 February 1885, completed 18 July 1885, renamed Callao 1905, scrapped September 1907.
- SS Nurjahan, cargo ship for Asiatic Steamship Co, launched 23 August 1884, completed 27 September 1885.
- SS Kohinur, cargo ship for Asiatic Steamship Co, launched 8 October 1884, completed 16 January 1885.
- Callao, sailing ship for White Star Line, launched 1 January 1885, completed 26 January 1885.
- Santiago, sailing ship for White Star Line, launched 17 January 1885, completed 4 March 1885.
- Eblana, hopper barge for Dublin Harbour Board, launched 24 October 1885, completed 1 November 1885.
- SS Teneriffe, cargo ship for British & Africa Steamship Co, launched 19 February 1885, completed 16 April 1885.
- SS Elmina, cargo ship for African Steamship Co, launched 23 April 1885, completed 28 June 1885.
- SS Costa Rican, cargo ship for West India Steam Navigation Co, launched 16 June 1885, completed 27 August 1885.
- Zemindar, sailing ship for T&J Brocklebank, launched 30 June 1885, completed 14 August 1885.
- TSS Irene, ferry for London and North Western Railway, launched 10 July 1885, completed 29 September 1885.
- Talookdar, sailing ship for T&J Brocklebank, launched 22 August 1885, completed 24 September 1885.
- Queen's Island, sailing ship for S Lawler, launched 22 September 1885, completed 29 September 1885.
- SS Caloric, ferry for Belfast Steamship Co, launched 10 October 1885, completed 21 December 1885.
- SS Optic, ferry for Belfast Steamship Co, launched 12 November 1885, completed 29 January 1886.
- SS Iran, cargo ship for Edward Bates & Son, launched 5 January 1886, completed 16 March 1886.
- SS Saint Fillans, cargo ship for Rankin Gilmour & Co, launched 25 February 1885, completed 24 September 1886.
- SS Inishowen Head, cargo ship for Ulster Steamship Co, launched 24 April 1886, completed 30 June 1886.
- HMS Lizard, gun boat for British Admiralty, launched 27 November 1886, completed 4 February 1887, scrapped 1905.
- HMS Bramble, gun boat for British Admiralty, launched 11 December 1886, completed 1 March 1887, renamed Cockatrice 1896, sold 1906.
- Lord Templeton, for Irish Shipowners Ltd, launched 5 May 1886, completed 12 June 1886.
- SS Ormiston, cargo ship for Irish Shipowners Ltd, launched 31 August 1886, completed 30 October 1886.
- Swanmore, sailing ship for WJ Myers Ltd, launched 22 June 1886, completed 10 August 1886.
- Stanmore, sailing ship for WJ Myers Ltd, launched 14 August 1886, completed 25 September 1886.
- SS Etolia, cargo ship for D&C MacIver, launched 8 January 1887, completed 9 April 1887.
- SS Minnesota, cargo ship for Torrey & Field Ltd, launched 2 August 1887, completed 22 November 1887.
- SS Hercules, dredger for Londonderry Harbour Board, launched 12 October 1886, completed 8 March 1887.
- SS Lycia, cargo ship for D&C MacIver, launched 5 November 1887, completed 12 May 1888.
- SS Michigan, passenger ship for White Diamond Steamship Co, launched 5 July 1887, completed 15 October 1887.
- TSS Anglesey, ferry for London & North Western Railway, launched 20 August 1887, completed 1 May 1888.
- SS Oceania, passenger ship for P&O, launched 17 September 1887, completed 26 February 1888.
- Sindia, sailing ship for T&J Brocklebank, launched 19 November 1887, completed 6 February 1888.
- SS Arcadia, passenger ship for P&O, launched 17 December 1887, completed 12 May 1888.
- Holkar, sailing ship for T&J Brocklebank, launched 11 February 1888, completed 30 April 1888.
- SS Idar, cargo ship for F Leyland & Co, launched 14 April 1888, completed 3 July 1888.
- SS Bostonian, cargo ship for White Star Line, launched 14 March 1888, completed 11 August 1888.
- SS Palmas, cargo ship for Sir AL Jones, launched 24 July 1888, completed 13 October 1888.
- SS Cufic, livestock carrier for White Star Line, launched 10 October 1888, completed 1 December 1888, renamed Nuestra Senora de Guadalupe 1896 and Manxman 1901, foundered 18 December 1919.
- SS Lord Londonderry, cargo ship for Irish Shipowners Ltd, launched 17 November 1888, completed 6 December 1888.
- SS Runic, livestock carrier for White Star Line, launched 1 January 1889, completed 16 February 1889, maiden voyage 21 February 1889, renamed Tampican 1895, Imo 1912 and Guvernøren 1918, wrecked 1921.
- RMS Teutonic, passenger ship for White Star Line, launched 19 January 1889, completed 25 July 1889, maiden voyage 7 August 1889, scrapped in 1921.
- SS British Empire, cargo ship for British Shipowners Ltd, launched 28 February 1889, completed 13 April 1889.
- SS Lancashire, cargo ship for Bibby Steamship Co, launched 27 April 1889, completed 10 August 1889.
- RMS Majestic, passenger ship for White Star Line, launched 22 June 1889, completed 22 March 1890.
- SS Queensmore, cargo ship for William Johnstone, launched 26 June 1889, completed 26 July 1889. Lost on her maiden voyage.
- SS Yorkshire, cargo ship for Bibby Steamship Co, launched 27 July 1889, completed 5 October 1889.
- SS Ameer, cargo ship for T&J Brocklebank, launched 24 August 1889, completed 17 October 1889.
- SS Gaekwar, cargo ship for T&J Brocklebank, launched 24 December 1889, completed 15 March 1890.
- SS Nawab, cargo ship for Asiatic Steamship Co, launched 28 September 1889, completed 23 November 1889.
- SS Nadir, cargo ship for Asiatic Steamship Co, launched 26 October 1889, completed 24 December 1889.
- SS Nizam, cargo ship for Asiatic Steamship Co, launched 26 October 1889, completed 29 December 1889.
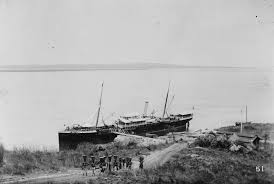
Akassa

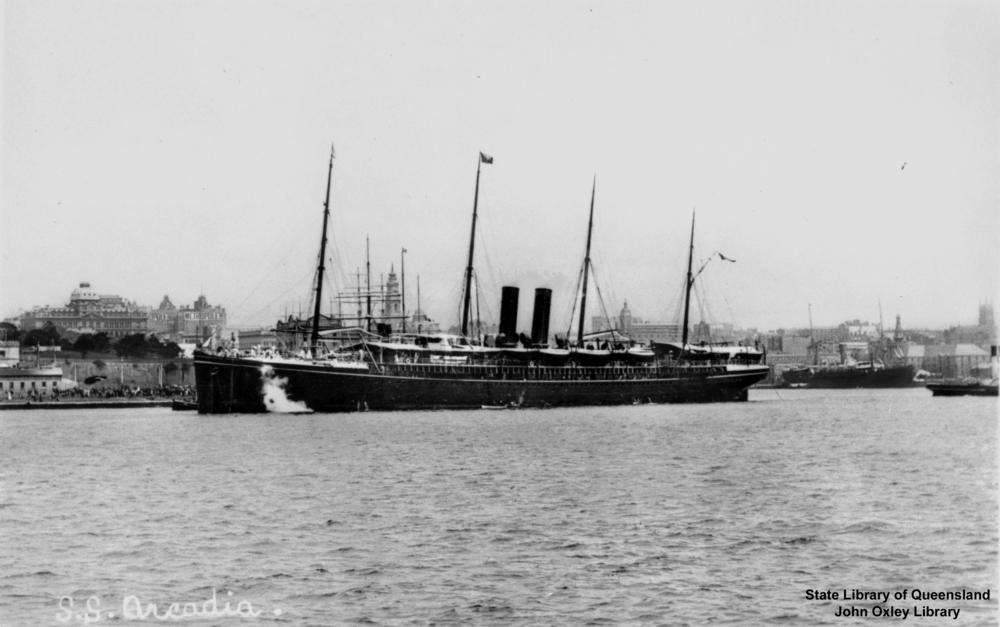
Arcadia

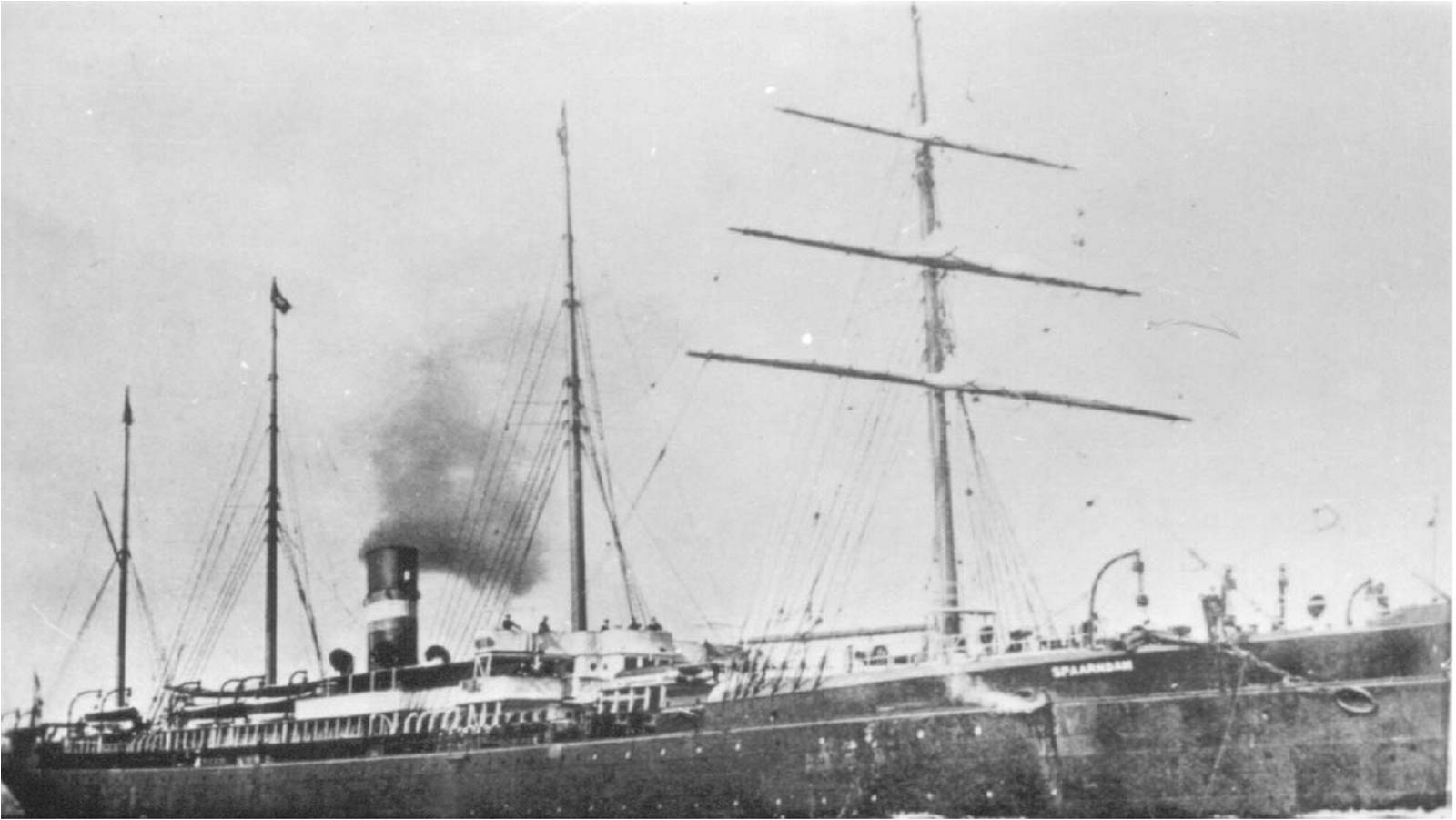
Spaarndam (launched as Arabic)

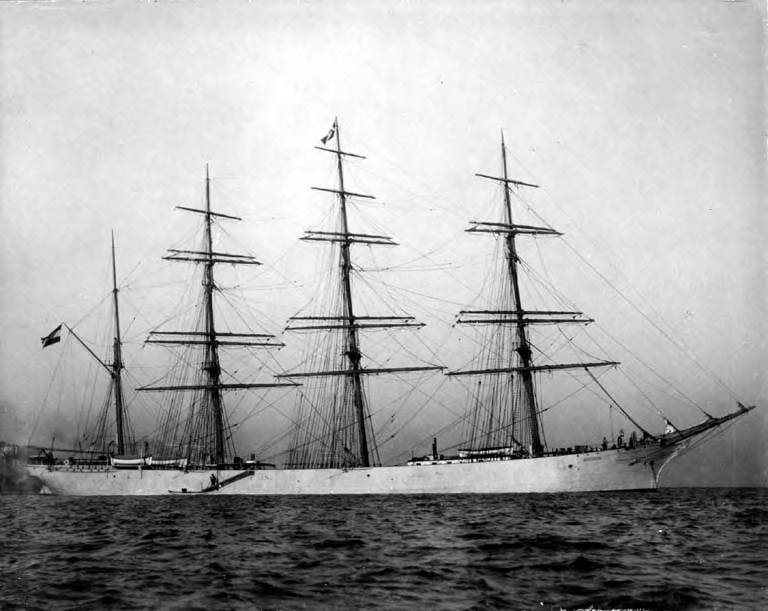
Columbia

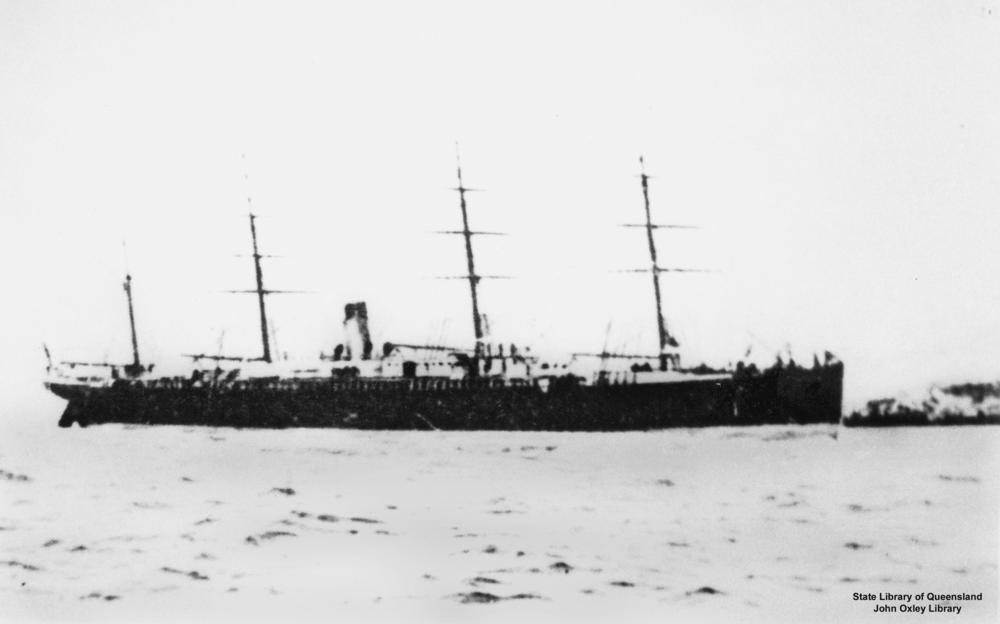
Coptic

W J Pirrie

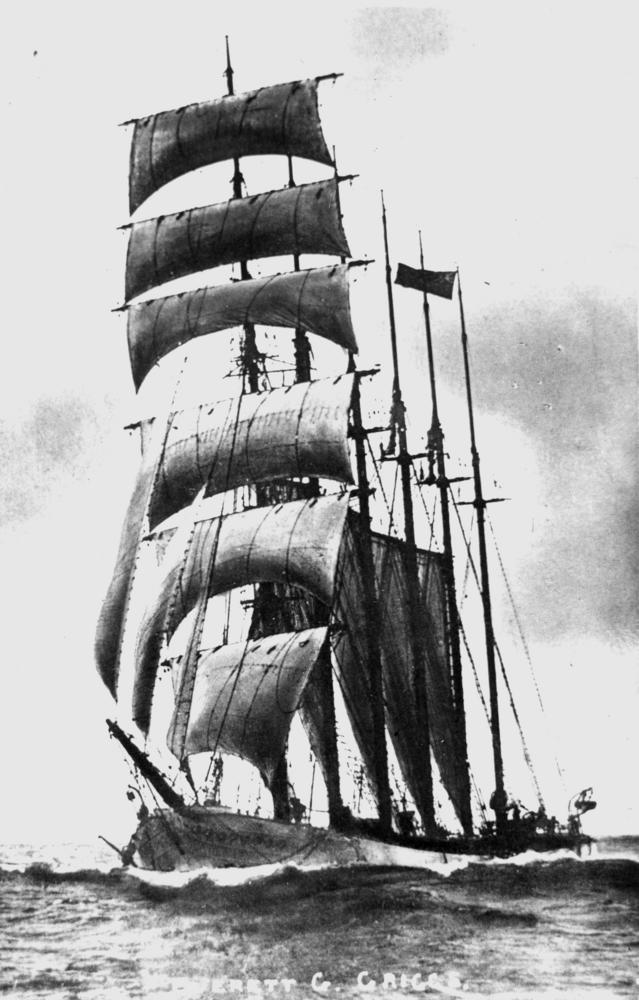
Everett G. Griggs (launched as Lord Wolseley)

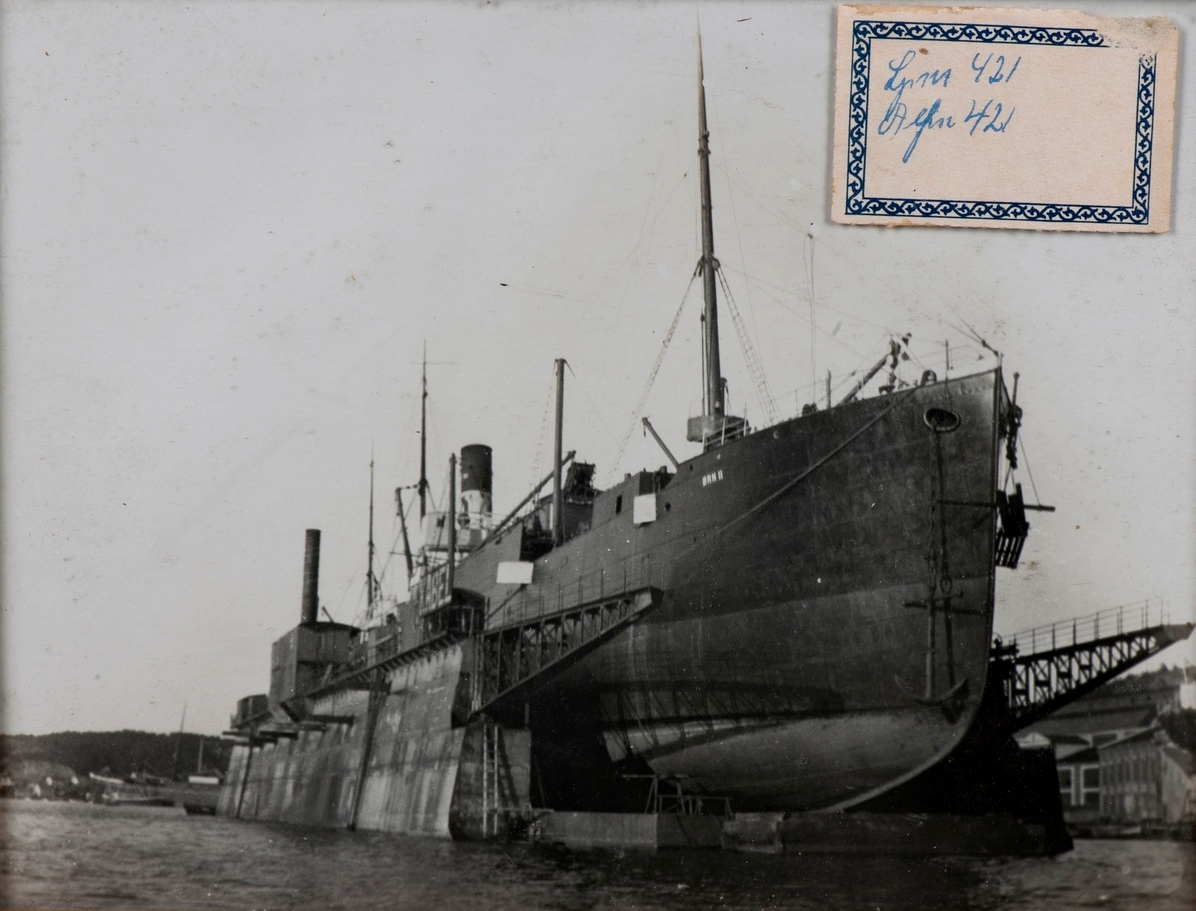
Ørn II (launched as Gaekwar)

RMS Gaelic

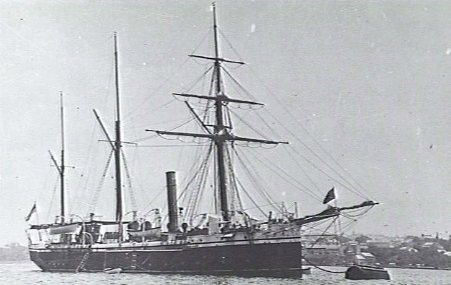
HMS Lizard

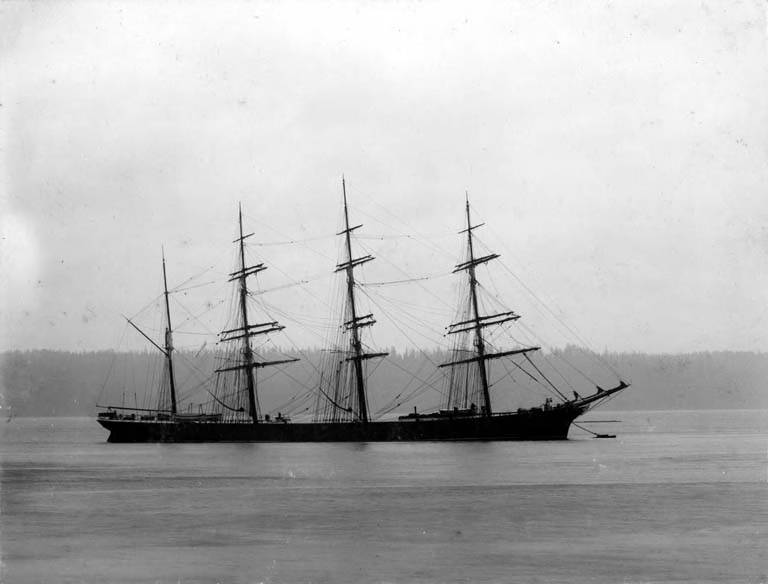
Lord Wolseley

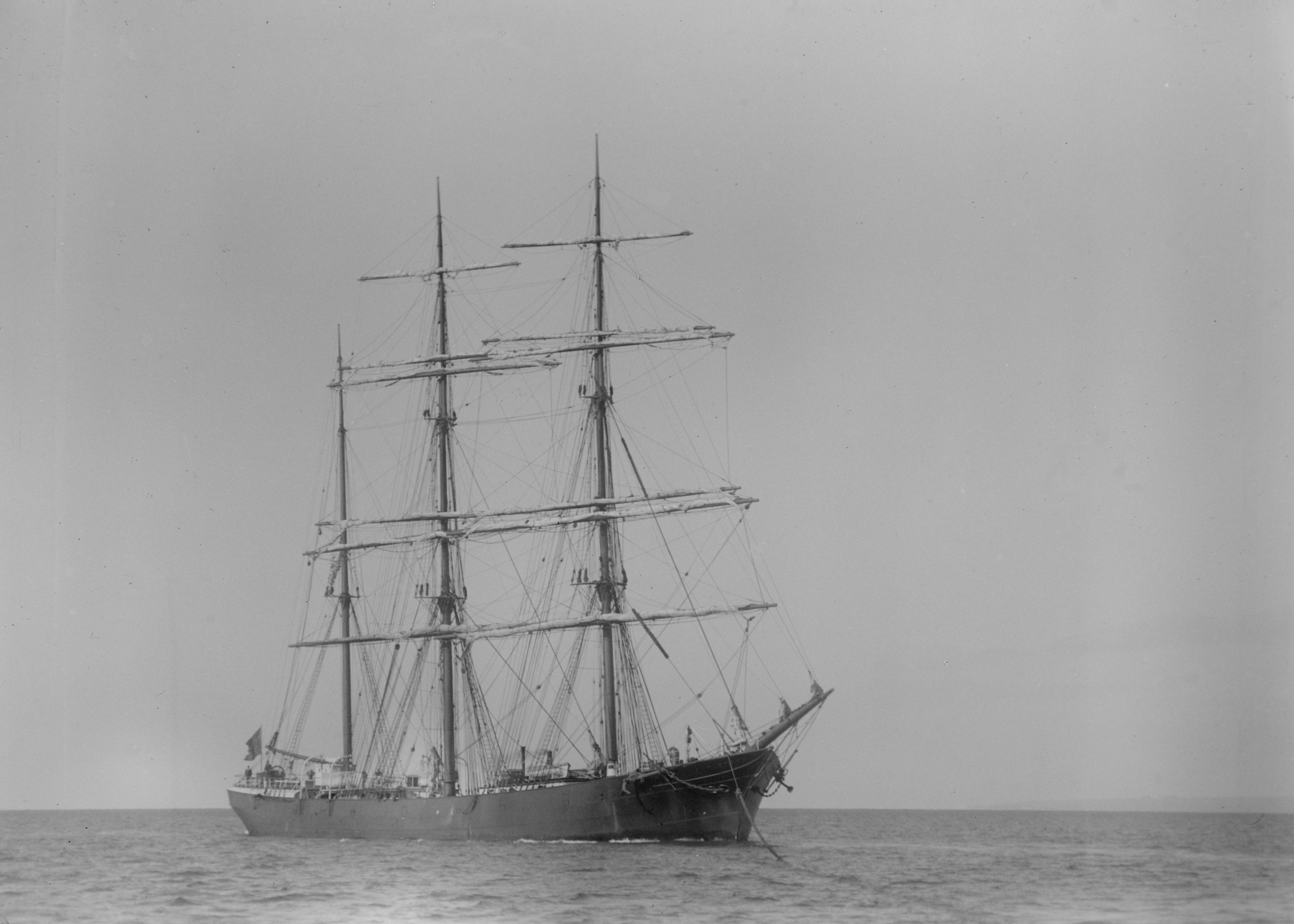
Lord Templetown

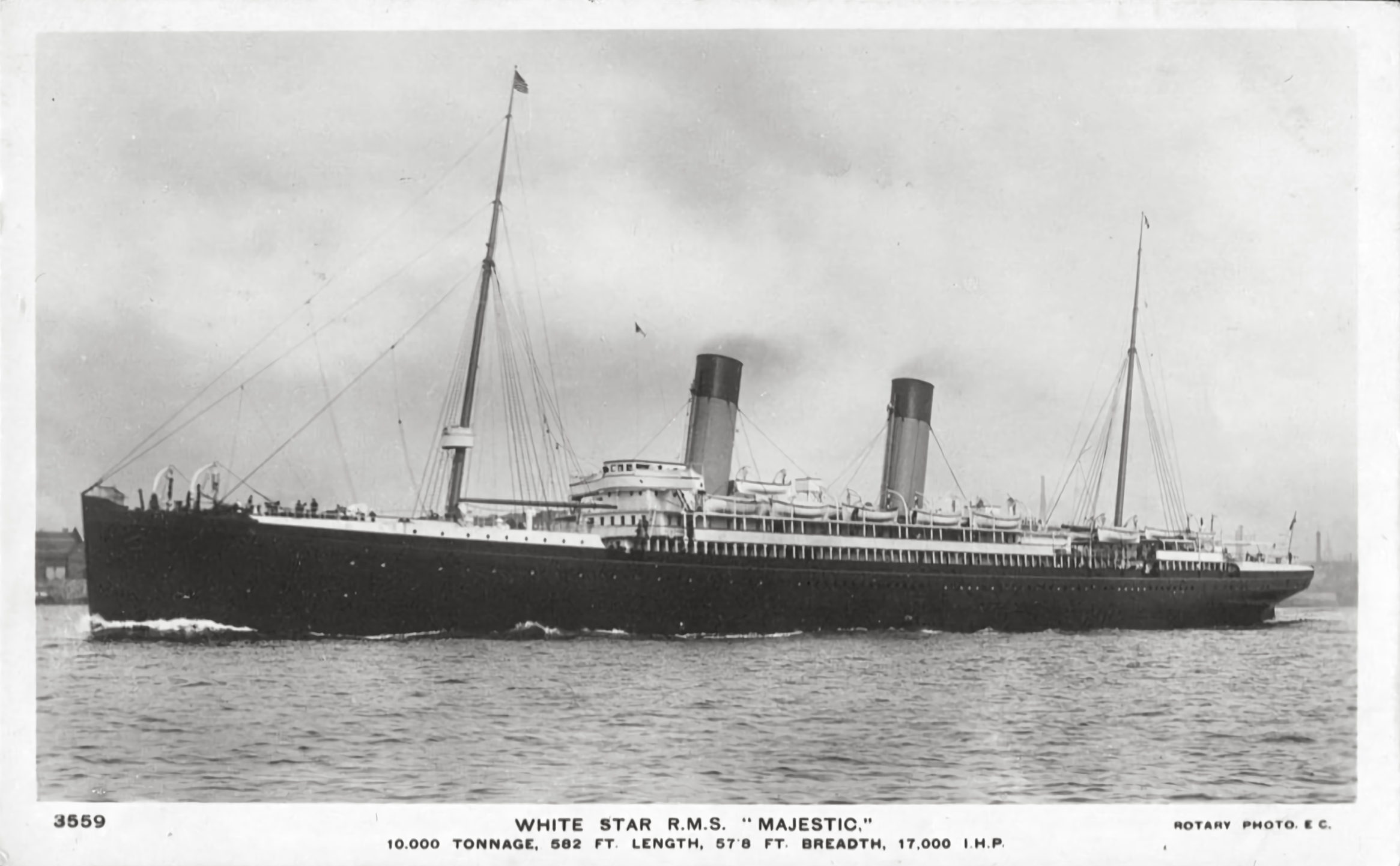
Majestic

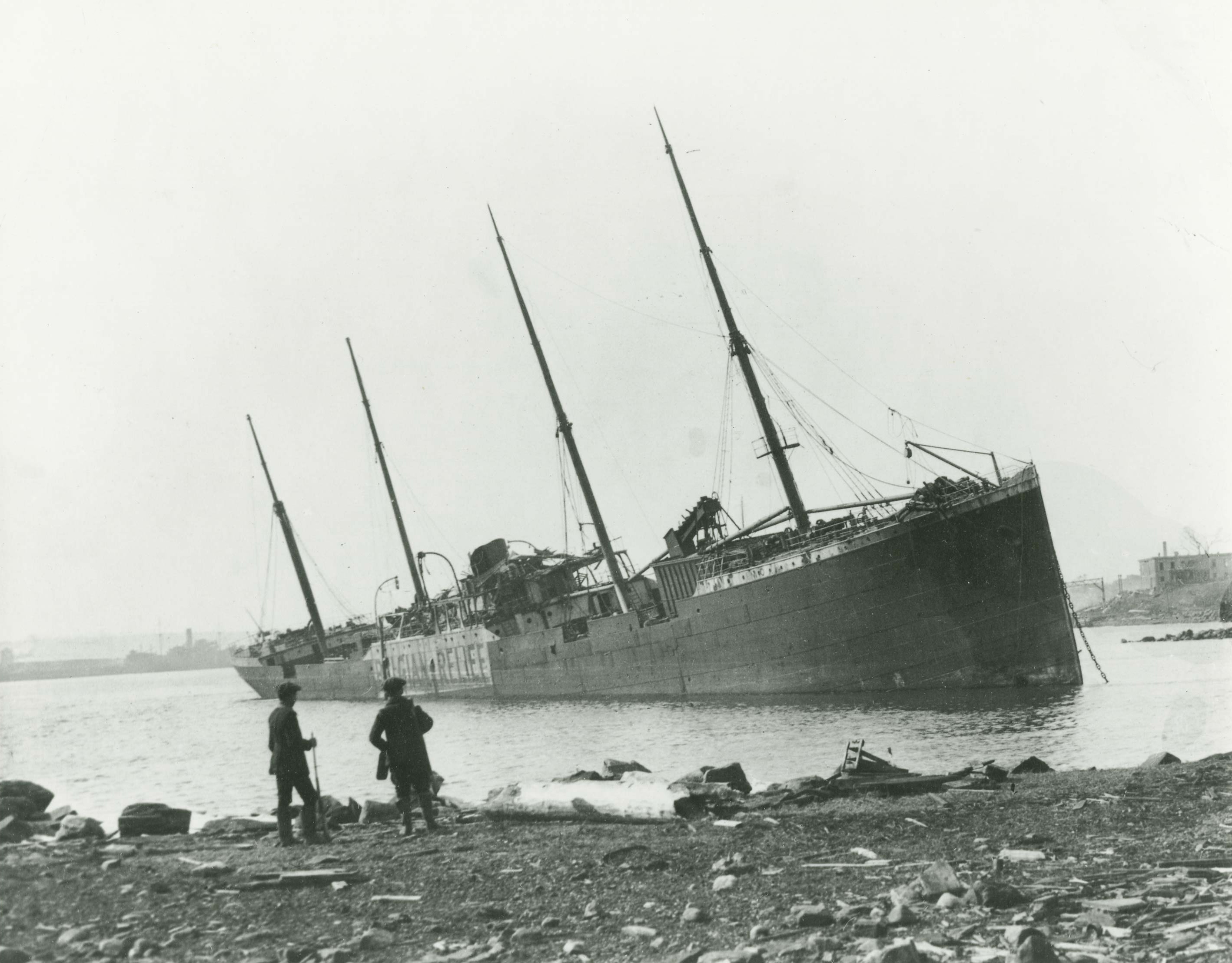
Imo (launched as Runic)

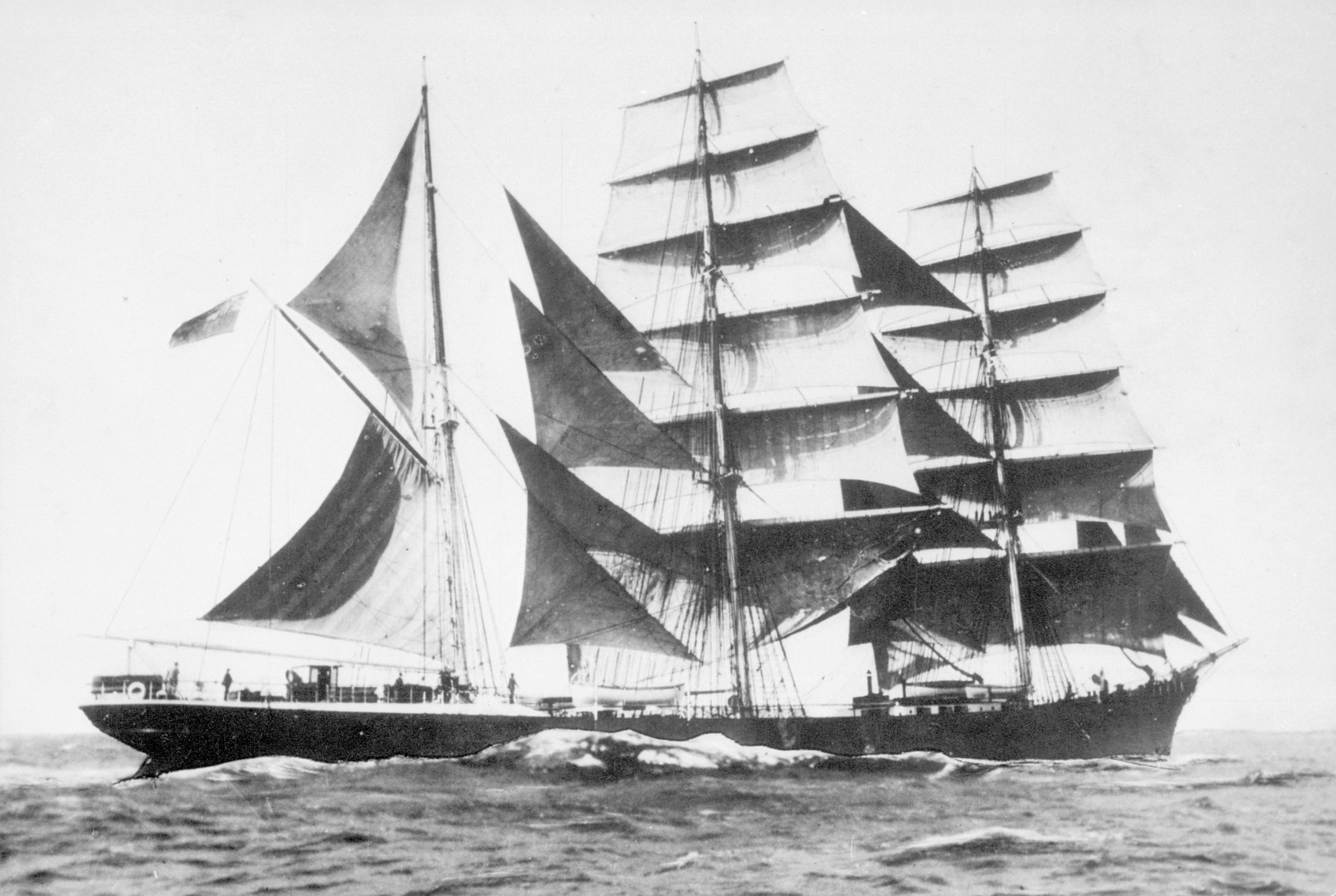
Strathdon

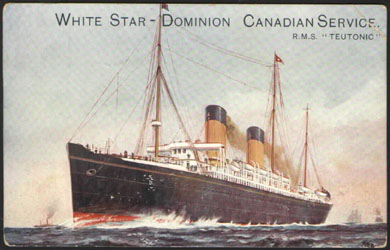
Teutonic

== 1890s ==
- SS Alexander Elder, cargo ship for Elder Dempster, launched 23 January 1890, completed 19 April 1890.
- SS Saint Pancras, cargo ship for Rankin Gilmour & Co, launched 8 February 1890, completed 13 May 1890.
- California, sailing ship for North Western Shipping, launched 22 February 1890, completed 24 April 1890.
- SS Imaum, cargo ship for Edward Bates & Son, launched 25 March 1890, completed 31 May 1890.
- SS Michigan, cargo ship for Baltimore Lighterage Co, launched 19 April 1890, completed 21 June 1890, maiden voyage 24 June 1890, renamed USAT Kilpatrick, Acropolis, Washington, Great Canton, scrapped 1924.
- SS Plassey, cargo ship for T&J Brocklebank, launched 22 May 1890, completed 5 July 1890.
- SS Columbian, cargo ship for F Leyland & Co, launched 5 July 1890, completed 23 August 1890.
- SS Georgian, cargo ship for F Leyland & Co, launched 16 August 1890, completed 27 September 1890.
- SS Mississippi, launched 29 August 1890, completed 18 October 1890, maiden voyage 28 October 1890, renamed USAT Buford, scrapped 1929
- SS Sobraon, cargo ship for African Steamship Co, launched 17 September 1890, completed 6 November 1890.
- SS Memphis, cargo ship for Elder Dempster, launched 18 October 1890, completed 27 November 1890.
- SS Ernesto, cargo ship for GH Fletcher & Co, launched 1 November 1890, completed 11 December 1890.
- SS British Crown, passenger ship for British Shipowners Ltd, launched 29 November 1890, completed 17 January 1891.
- SS Nomadic, livestock carrier for White Star Line, launched 11 February 1891, completed 14 April 1891, maiden voyage 24 April 1891, renamed Cornishman 1904, scrapped 1926.
- SS Tauric, livestock carrier for White Star Line, launched 12 March 1891, completed 16 May 1891, renamed Welshman 1903, scrapped 1929.
- SS Magnetic, passenger tender for White Star Line, launched 28 March 1891, completed 6 June 1891, renamed Ryde 1932, scrapped 1935.
- SS Labrador, passenger ship for Dominion Steamship Co, launched 11 April 1891, completed 13 August 1891.
- SS Assaye, cargo ship for Elder Dempster, launched 9 May 1891, completed 4 July 1891.
- SS Cheshire, passenger ship for Bibby Steamship Co, launched 6 June 1891, completed 3 September 1891, renamed Seang Choon 1911, torpedoed and sunk 10 July 1917.
- SS Shropshire, passenger ship for Bibby Steamship Co, launched 27 June 1891, completed 3 October 1891, renamed Seang Bee 1909 and Seang Bee Maru in 1931, scrapped 1931.
- SS Lancastrian, cargo ship for F Leyland & Co, launched 25 July 1891, completed 17 October 1891.
- SS Philadelphian, cargo ship for F Leyland & Co, launched 20 August 1891, completed 12 November 1891.
- SS Ionia, cargo ship for D&C McIver, launched 31 October 1891, completed 12 January 1892.
- SS Pindari, cargo ship for T&J Brocklebank, launched 17 October 1891, completed 5 December 1891.
- SS Mahratta, cargo ship for T&J Brocklebank, launched 19 November 1891, completed 28 January 1892, wrecked in 1909
- SS Massachusetts, passenger ship for Baltimore Lighterage Co, launched 17 December 1891, completed 5 March 1892, maiden voyage 24 April 1892, renamed USAT Sheridan, scrapped October 1923.
- SS Manitoba, passenger ship for Baltimore Lighterage Co, launched 7 January 1892, completed 9 April 1892, maiden voyage 15 April 1892, renamed Logan, then Candler, scrapped in 1926.
- SS Mohawk, passenger ship for Elder Dempster, launched 25 February 1892, completed 7 May 1892, renamed Grant, then Chinouk, scrapped in 1946.
- Lord Templemore, sailing ship for Irish Shipowners Co, launched 27 February 1892, completed 19 April 1892.
- SS Lord Erne, cargo ship for Irish Shipowners Ltd, launched 29 March 1892, completed 28 May 1892.
- SS Naronic, livestock carrier for White Star Line, launched 26 May 1892, completed 11 July 1892, maiden voyage 15 July 1892, missing at sea March 1893.
- SS Bovic, livestock carrier for White Star Line, launched 28 June 1892, completed 22 August 1892, maiden voyage 26 August 1892, renamed Colonian, scrapped 1928.
- SS Mobile, cargo ship for African Steamship Co, launched 17 November 1892, completed 27 July 1893.
- SS Nurani, cargo ship for Asiatic Steamship Co, launched 9 July 1892, completed 10 September 1892.
- SS Sagamore, passenger ship for Geo Warren & Co, launched 8 September 1892, completed 30 November 1892.
- SS Nairung, cargo ship for Asiatic Steamship Co, launched 6 October 1892, completed 10 November 1892.
- SS Islam, cargo ship for Edward Bates & Co, launched 22 October 1892, completed 15 December 1892.
- Damson Hill, sailing ship for WJ Myers & Co, launched 24 November 1892, completed 18 January 1893.
- SS Orellana, passenger ship for PSNC, launched 7 December 1892, completed 23 February 1893.
- SS Antisana, cargo ship for PSNC, launched 22 December 1892, completed 11 March 1893.
- SS Mystic, ferry for Belfast Steamship Co, launched 4 February 1893, completed 1 April 1893.
- SS Gaul, passenger ship for Union Steamship Co, launched 16 February 1893, completed 6 May 1893.
- SS Orcana, passenger ship for PSNC, launched 7 March 1893, completed 8 July 1893.
- SS Goth, passenger ship for Union Steamship Co, launched 16 March 1893, completed 8 June 1893.
- SS Sarmiento, passenger ship for PSNC, launched 1 April 1893, completed 17 June 1893.
- SS Magic, ferry for Belfast Steamship Co, launched 20 April 1893, completed 10 August 1893.
- SS Greek, passenger ship for Union Steamship Co, launched 18 May 1893, completed 26 August 1893.
- SS Gothic, passenger ship for White Star Line, launched 28 June 1893, completed 28 November 1893, maiden voyage 28 December 1893, renamed Gothland, scrapped 1925.
- SS Sachem, passenger ship for Geo Warren & Co, launched 29 June 1893, completed 28 October 1893.
- SS Magellan, cargo ship for PSNC, launched 3 August 1893, completed 23 November 1893.
- SS Cevic, livestock carrier for White Star Line, launched 23 September 1893, completed 6 January 1894, renamed Bayol 1915, Bayleaf 1917 and Pyrula 1920, scrapped 1933.
- SS Inca, cargo ship for PSNC, launched 12 October 1893, completed 28 December 1893.
- SS Templemore, cargo ship for William Johnstone, launched 9 November 1893, completed 7 February 1894.
- SS Staffordshire, passenger ship for Bibby Steamship Co, launched 7 December 1893, completed 2 April 1894.
- SS Torr Head cargo ship for Ulster Steamship Co, launched 20 January 1894, completed 7 April 1894.
- SS Pontic, baggage tender for White Star Line, launched 3 February 1894, completed 13 April 1894, scrapped 1930.
- SS Ikbal, cargo ship for Edward Bates & Son, launched 22 February 1894, completed 5 May 1894.
- SS Prussia, passenger ship for Hamburg America Line, launched 10 April 1894, completed 31 May 1894.
- SS Persia, passenger ship for Hamburg America Line, launched 8 May 1894, completed 15 July 1894, renamed Minnewaska and then USAT Thomas, scrapped in 1929.
- SS Guelph, passenger ship for Union Steamship Co, launched 26 June 1894, completed 8 September 1894.
- SS Norman, passenger ship for Union Steamship Co, launched 19 July 1894, completed 13 October 1894.
- SS Blairmore, cargo ship for William Johnstone, launched 14 August 1894, completed 17 October 1894.
- SS Ulstermore, cargo ship for William Johnstone, launched 16 October 1894, completed 6 December 1894.
- SS Marino, cargo ship for Thomas Dixon & Sons, launched 10 November 1894, completed 2 March 1895.
- SS Oropesa, passenger ship for PSNC, launched 29 November 1894, completed 9 February 1895.
- SS Scotsman, passenger ship for Richard Mills & Co, launched 13 December 1894, completed 11 April 1895, maiden voyage November 1895, ran shore and was lost on 29 September 1899.
- SS Orissa, passenger ship for PSNC, launched 15 December 1894, completed 30 March 1895.
- SS Georgic, livestock carrier for White Star Line, launched 22 June 1895, completed 8 August 1895, maiden voyage 26 August 1895, scuttled 10 December 1916.
- SS Victorian, passenger ship for F Leyland & Co, launched 6 July 1895, completed 31 August 1895.
- SS Armenian, passenger ship for F Leyland & Co, launched 25 July 1895, completed 19 September 1895, maiden voyage 28 November 1895, sunk by torpedo 28 June 1915.
- SS American, cargo ship for West India & Pacific Steam Navigation Co, launched 8 August 1895, completed 8 October 1895.
- SS Historian, cargo ship for Charente Steamship Co, launched 7 September 1895, completed 29 January 1896.
- SS Cestrian, passenger ship for F Leyland & Co, launched 21 September 1895, completed 5 March 1896.
- SS Vedamore, cargo ship for William Johnstone, launched 19 October 1895, completed 28 March 1896.
- SS Iran, cargo ship for Edward Bates & Son, launched 29 February 1896, completed 30 April 1896.
- SS Istrar, cargo ship for Edward Bates & Son, launched 14 March 1896, completed 4 June 1896.
- HMHS China, passenger ship for P&O, launched 13 June 1896, completed 28 November 1896.
- SS Canada, passenger ship for Dominion Line, launched on 14 May 1896, completed 26 September 1896, maiden voyage 1 October 1896, scrapped 1926.
- SS Comic, ferry for Belfast Steamship Co, launched 9 June 1896, completed 25 September 1896.
- SS European, cargo ship for West India & Pacific Steam Navigation Co, launched 9 July 1896, completed 3 December 1896.
- SS Gascon, passenger ship for Union Steamship Line, launched 25 August 1896, completed 13 February 1897.
- SS Pennsylvania, passenger ship for Holland America Line, launched on 10 September 1896, completed 30 January 1897, renamed USS Nanesmond 1919, scrapped 1924.
- SS Gaika, passenger ship for Union Steamship Line, launched 22 September 1896, completed 15 April 1897, scrapped 1929.
- SS Arcadia, cargo ship for Hamburg America Line, launched 8 October 1896, completed 2 April 1897.
- SS Arabia, cargo ship for Hamburg America Line, launched 21 November 1896, completed 7 March 1897.
- SS Oravia, passenger ship for PSNC, launched 5 December 1896, completed 12 June 1897.
- SS Delphic, passenger ship for White Star Line, launched 5 January 1897, completed 15 May 1897, torpedoed and sunk 17 March 1917
- SS Goorkha, passenger ship for Union Steamship Co, launched 23 January 1897, completed 28 August 1897.
- SS Rotterdam, passenger ship for Holland America Line, launched 18 February 1897, completed 29 July 1897, maiden voyage 18 August 1897, renamed CF Tietgen 1906 and 'Dwinsk 1913, torpedoed and sunk 18 June 1918.
- SS Briton, passenger ship for Union Steamship Line, launched 5 June 1897, completed 26 November 1897.
- SS Derbyshire, passenger ship for Bibby Steamship Co, launched 21 July 1897, completed 8 October 1897, scrapped 1931.
- SS Winifreda, passenger ship for F Leyland & Co, launched 11 September 1897, completed 17 February 1898, renamed Mesaba 1898, torpedoed and sunk 1 September 1918.
- SS Cymric, passenger ship for White Star Line, launched 12 October 1897, completed 5 February 1898, maiden voyage 29 April 1898, torpedoed and sunk 8 May 1916.
- SS Brasilia, passenger ship for Hamburg America Line, launched 27 November 1897, completed 21 March 1898.
- SS New England, passenger ship for Richard Mills & Co, launched 7 April 1898, completed 30 June 1898, renamed Romanic 1913, scrapped 1922.
- SS Statendam, passenger ship for Holland America Line, launched 7 May 1898, completed 18 August 1898, renamed Scotian 1911 and Marglen in 1922, scrapped 1927.
- SS Bay State, cargo ship for George Warren & Co, launched 4 June 1898, completed 31 August 1898.
- SS German, passenger ship for Union Steamship Co, launched 4 August 1898, completed 10 November 1898.
- RMS Oceanic, passenger ship for White Star Line, launched 14 January 1899, completed 26 August 1899, maiden voyage 6 September 1899, wrecked 8 September 1914.
- SS Afric, passenger ship for White Star Line, launched 6 November 1898, completed 2 February 1899, maiden voyage 8 February 1899, torpedoed and sunk 12 February 1917.
- SS Medic, passenger ship for White Star Line, launched 15 December 1898, completed 6 July 1899, renamed Hektoria 1928, sunk by U-boat 11 September 1942
- SS Winifredian, passenger ship for F Leyland & Co, launched 11 March 1899, completed 8 July 1899.
- SS Persic, passenger ship for White Star Line, launched 7 September 1899, completed 16 November 1899, scrapped 1927.
- SS Michigan, passenger ship for Atlantic Transport Co, launched 5 October 1899, completed 14 December 1899.
- SS Galeka, passenger ship for Union Steamship Co, launched 21 October 1899, completed 23 December 1899, mined 28 October 1916
- SS Minneapolis, passenger ship for Atlantic Transport Co, launched 18 November 1899, completed 29 March 1900, torpedoed and sunk March 1916.
- RMS Saxon, passenger ship for Union Steamship Co, launched 21 December 1899, completed 9 June 1900.
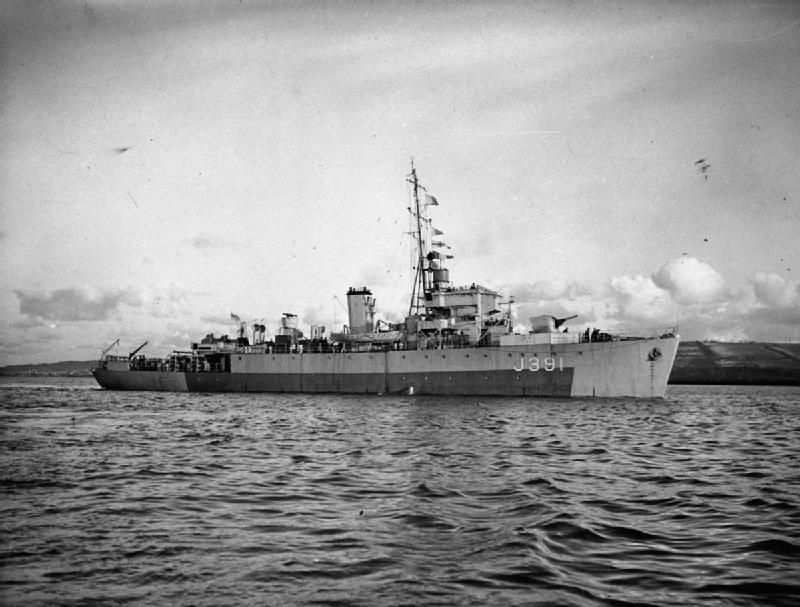
Afric

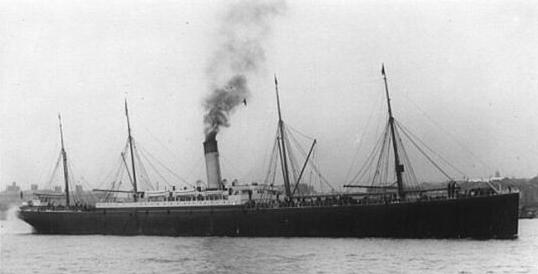
Armenian

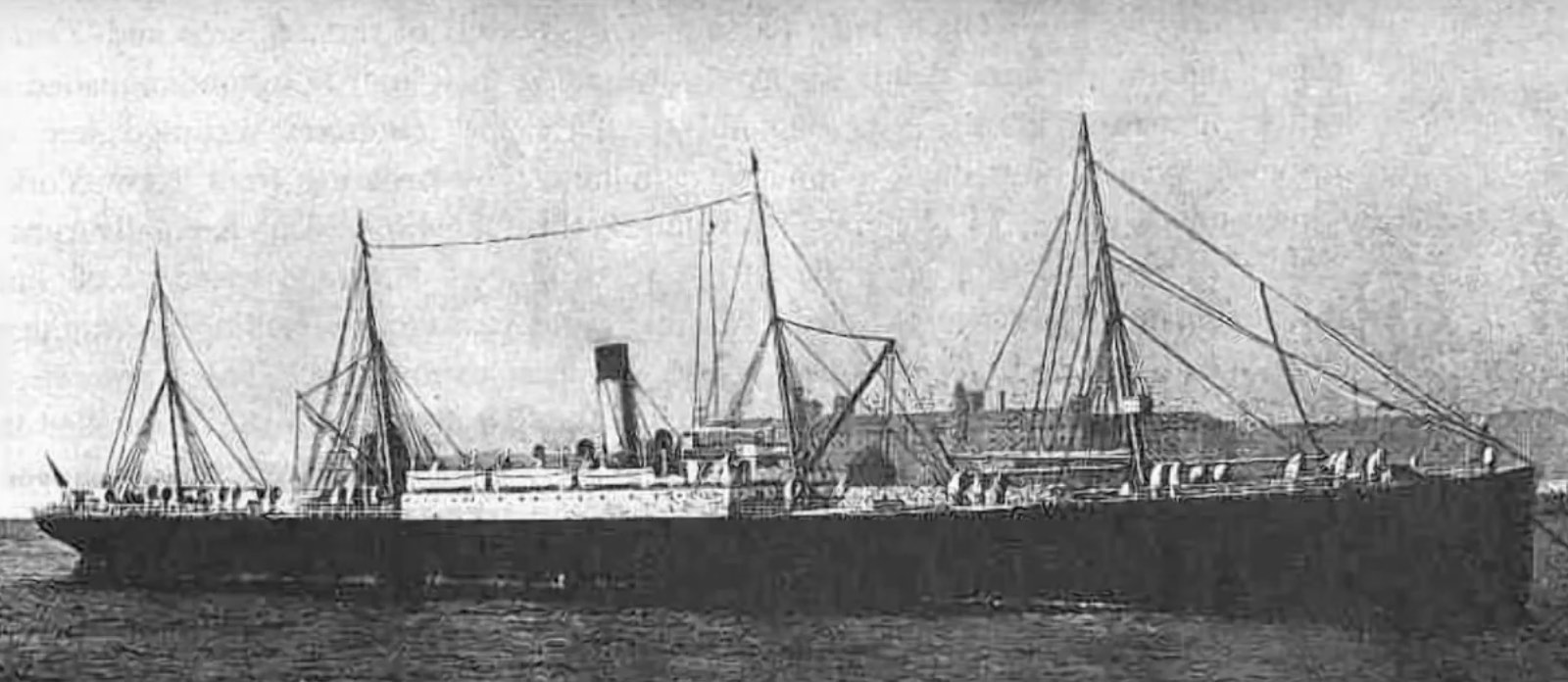
Bovic

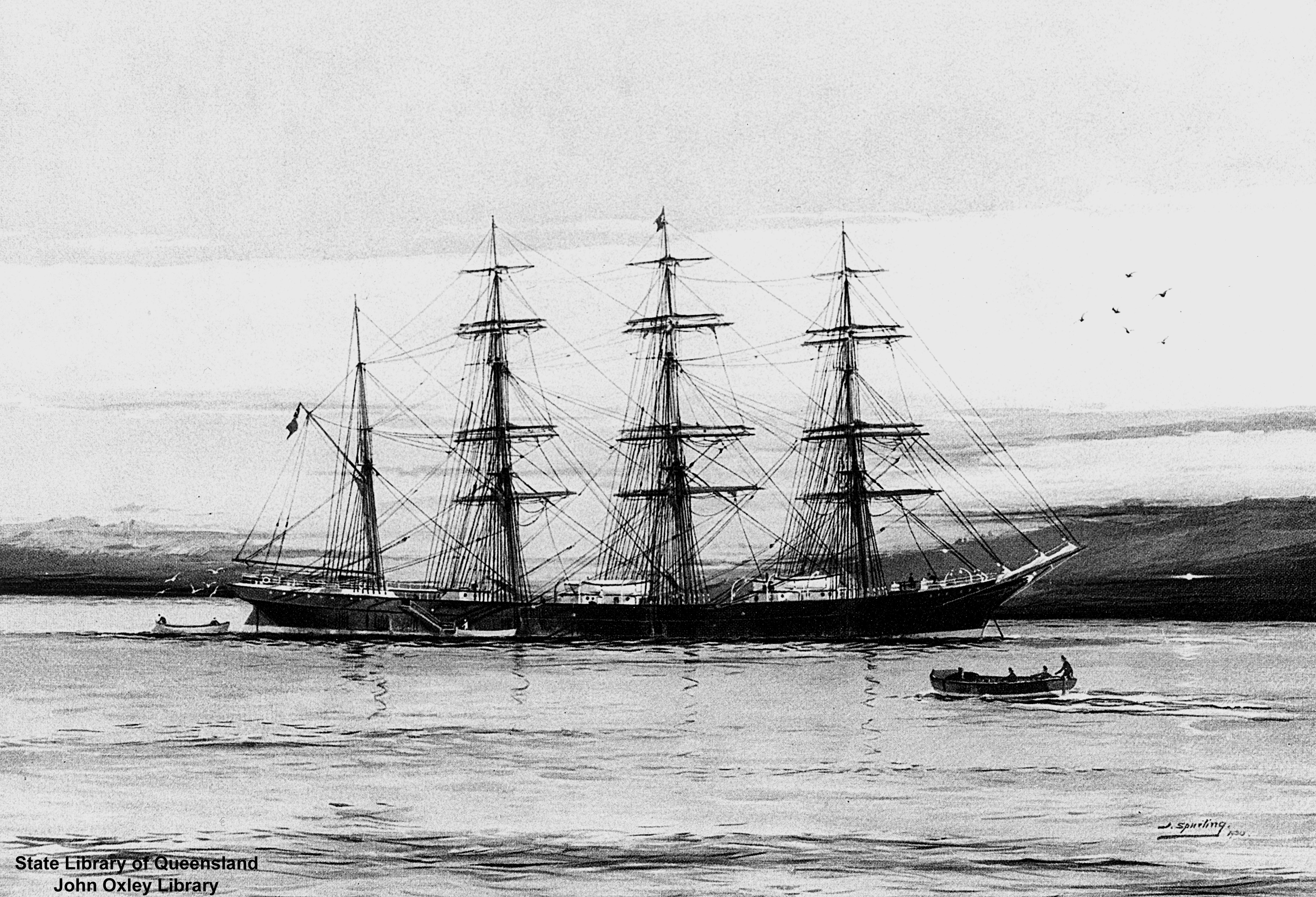
California

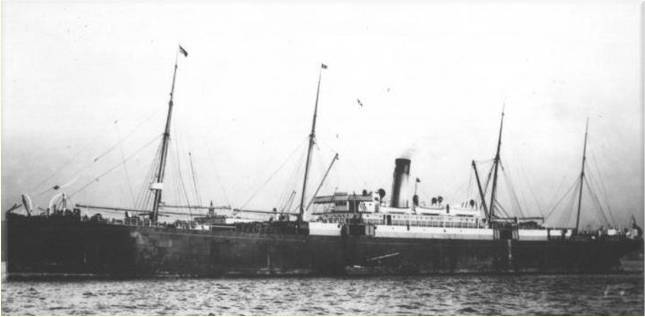
Cevic

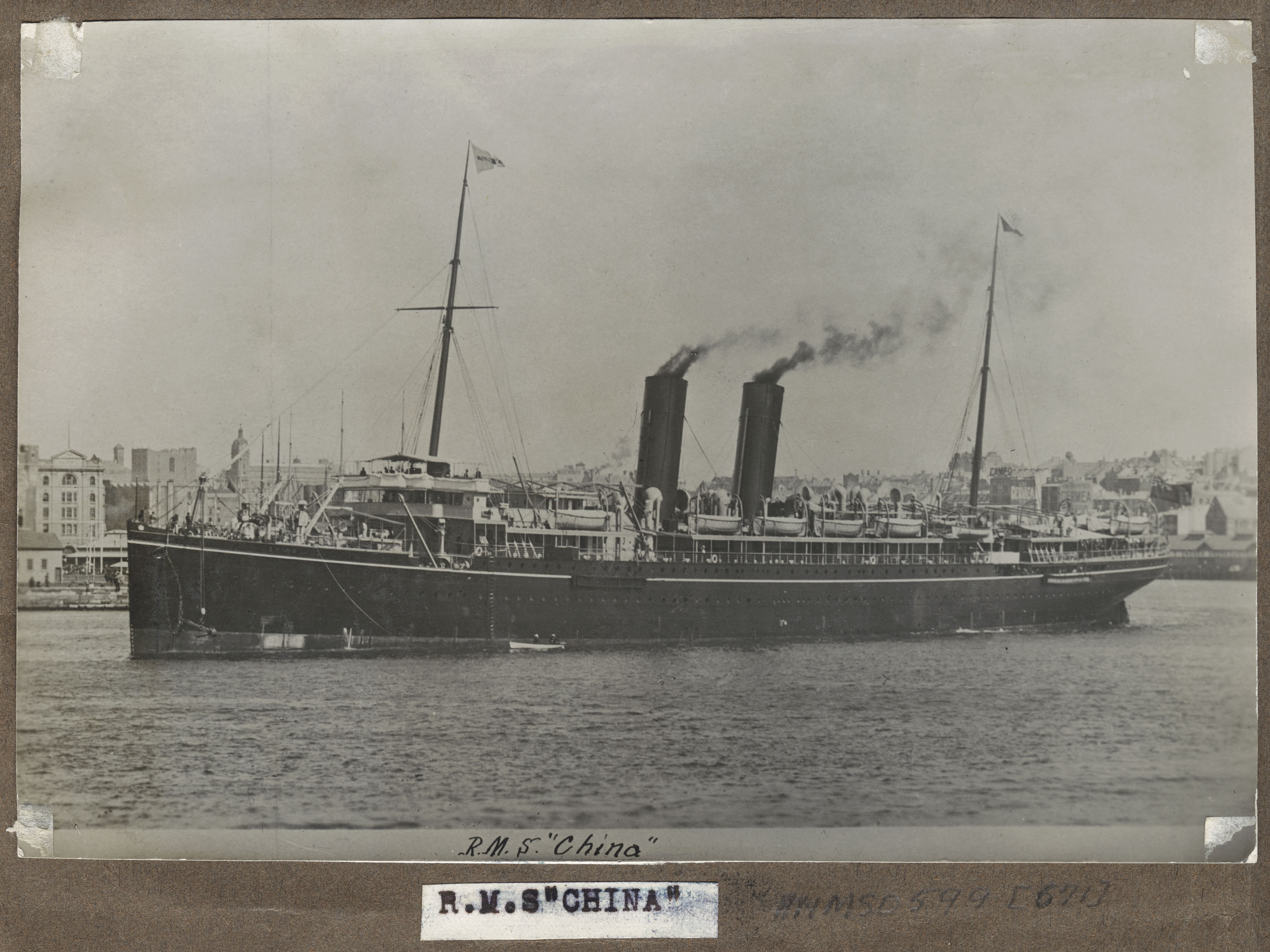
RMS China

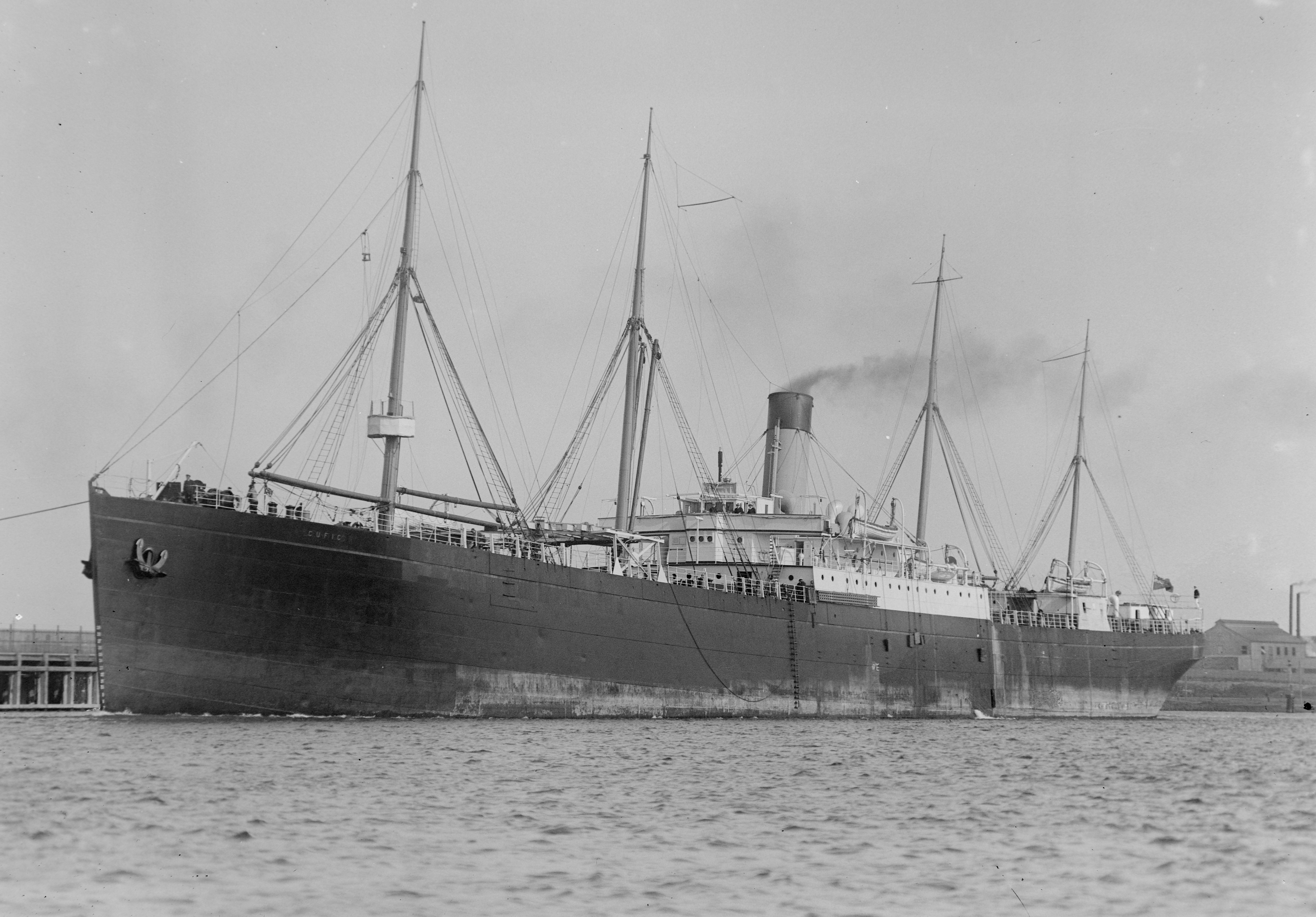
Cufic

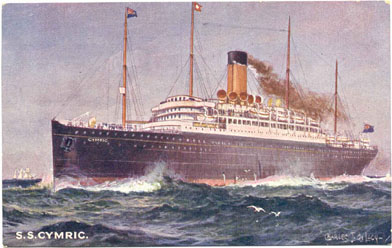
Cymric

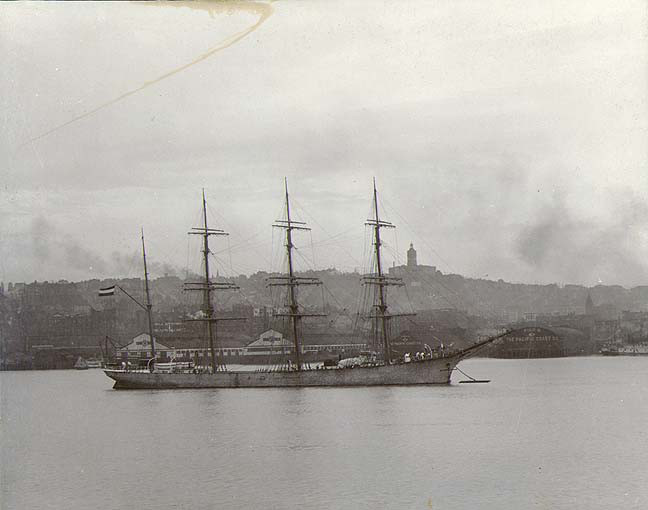
Niobe (launched as Damson Hill)

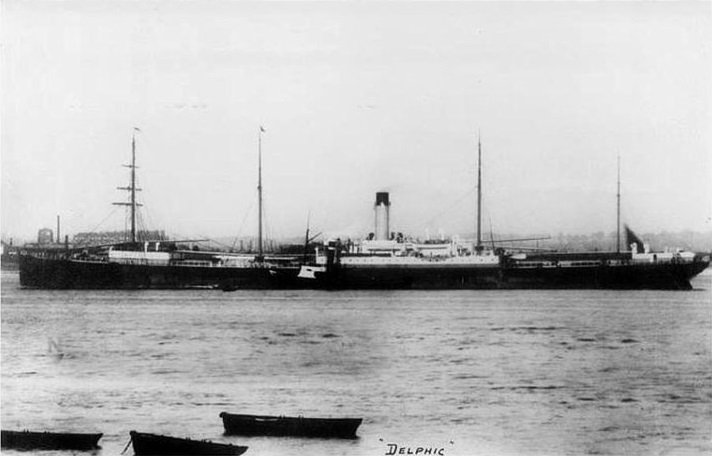
Delphic

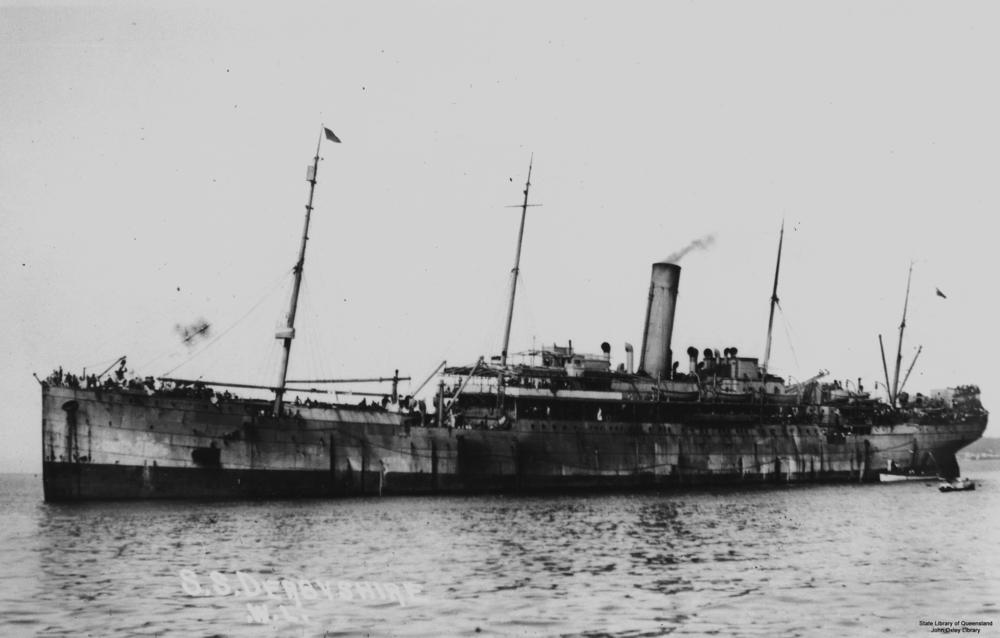
Derbyshire

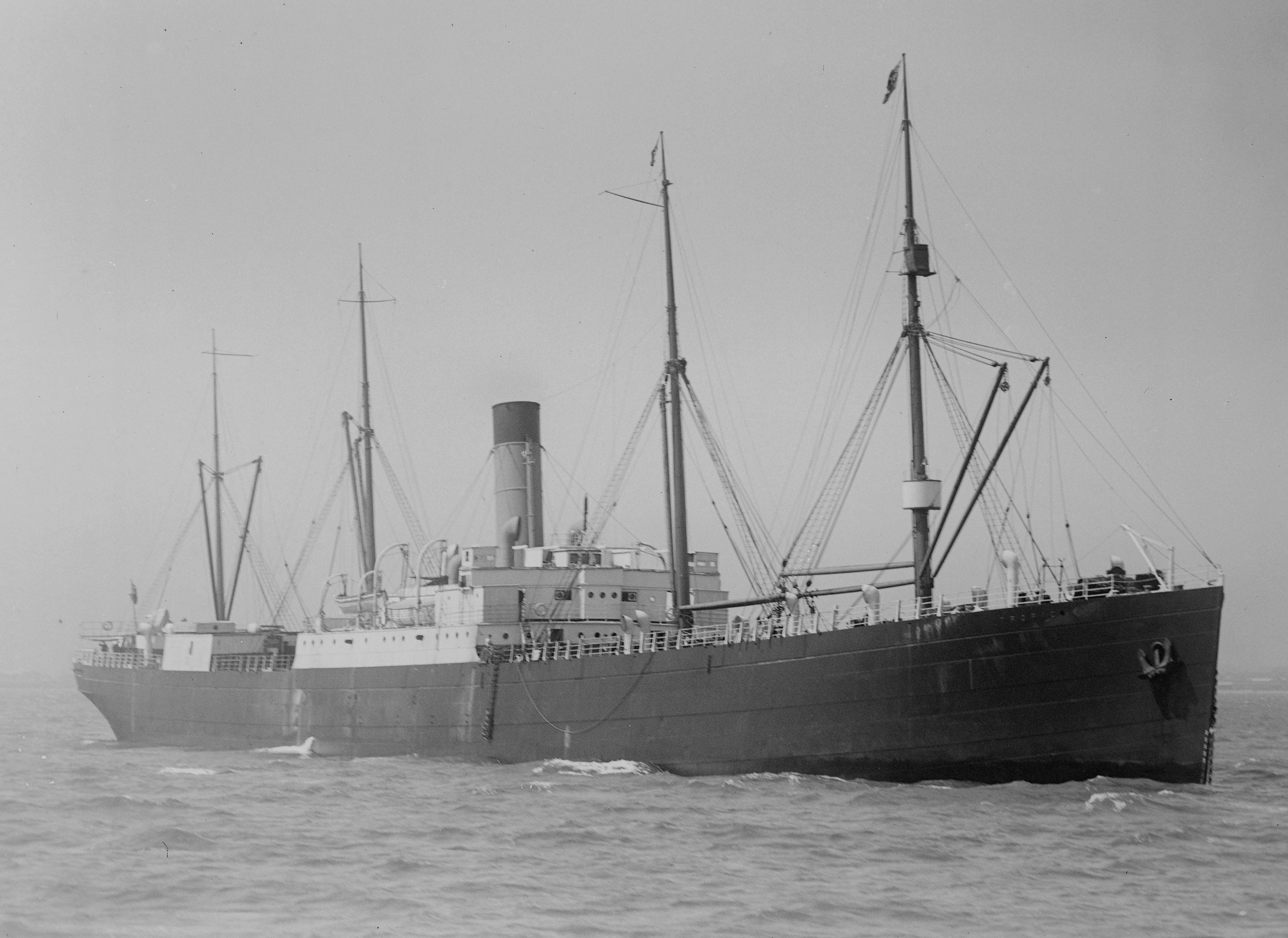
Tropic (launched as European)

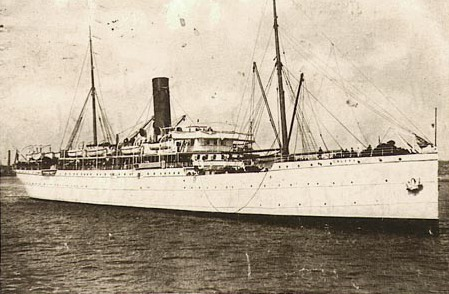
Galeka

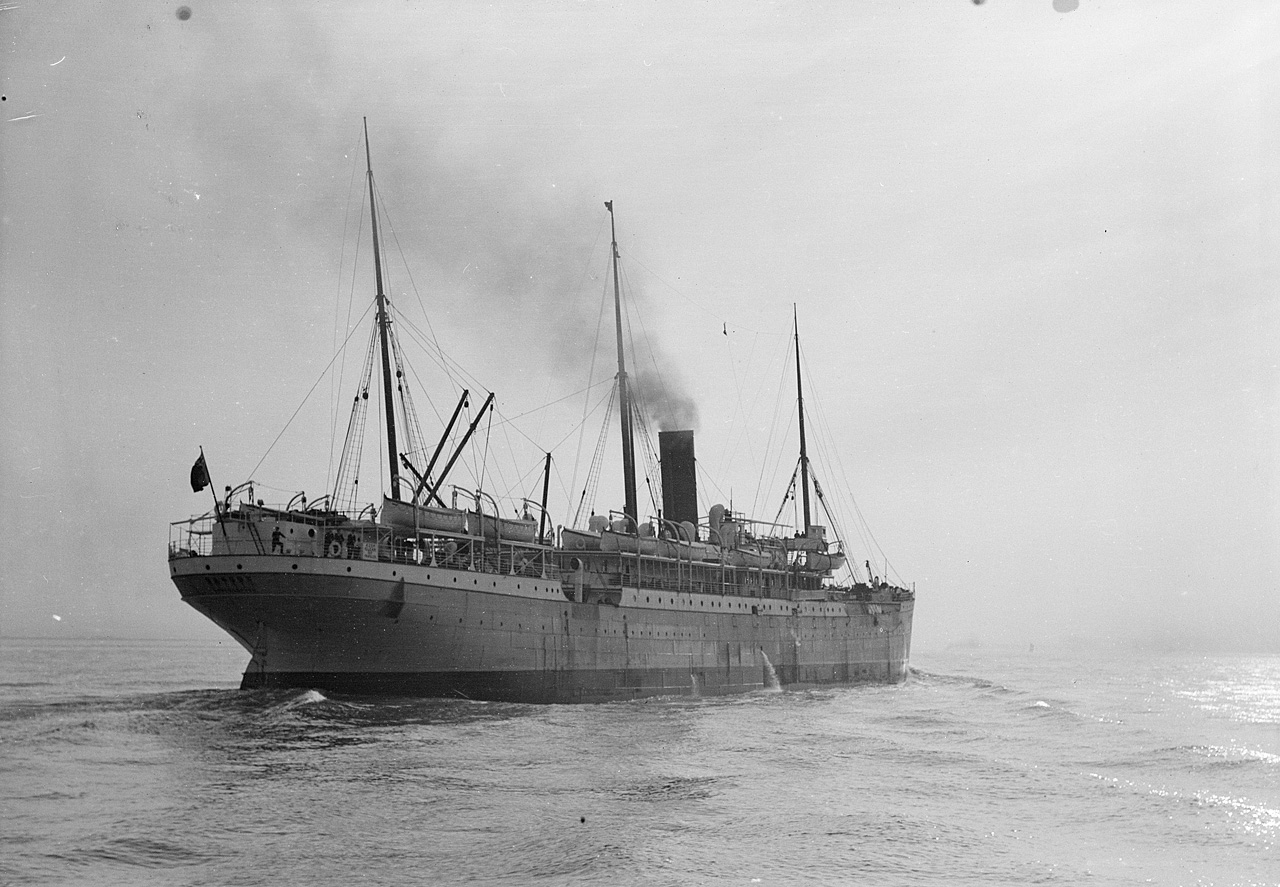
Gascon

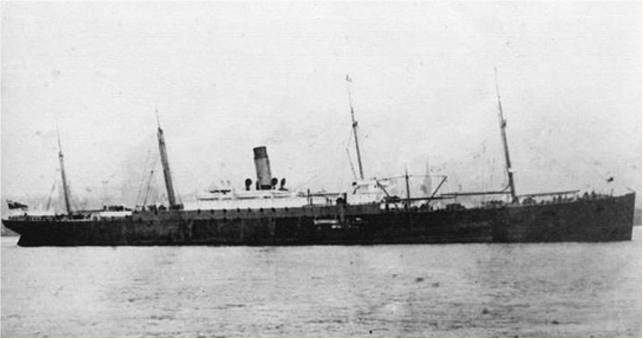
Georgic

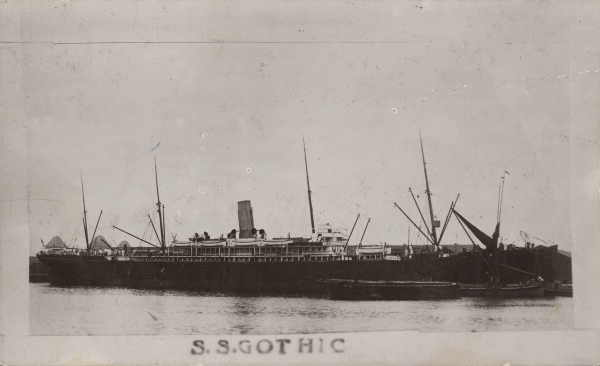
Gothic

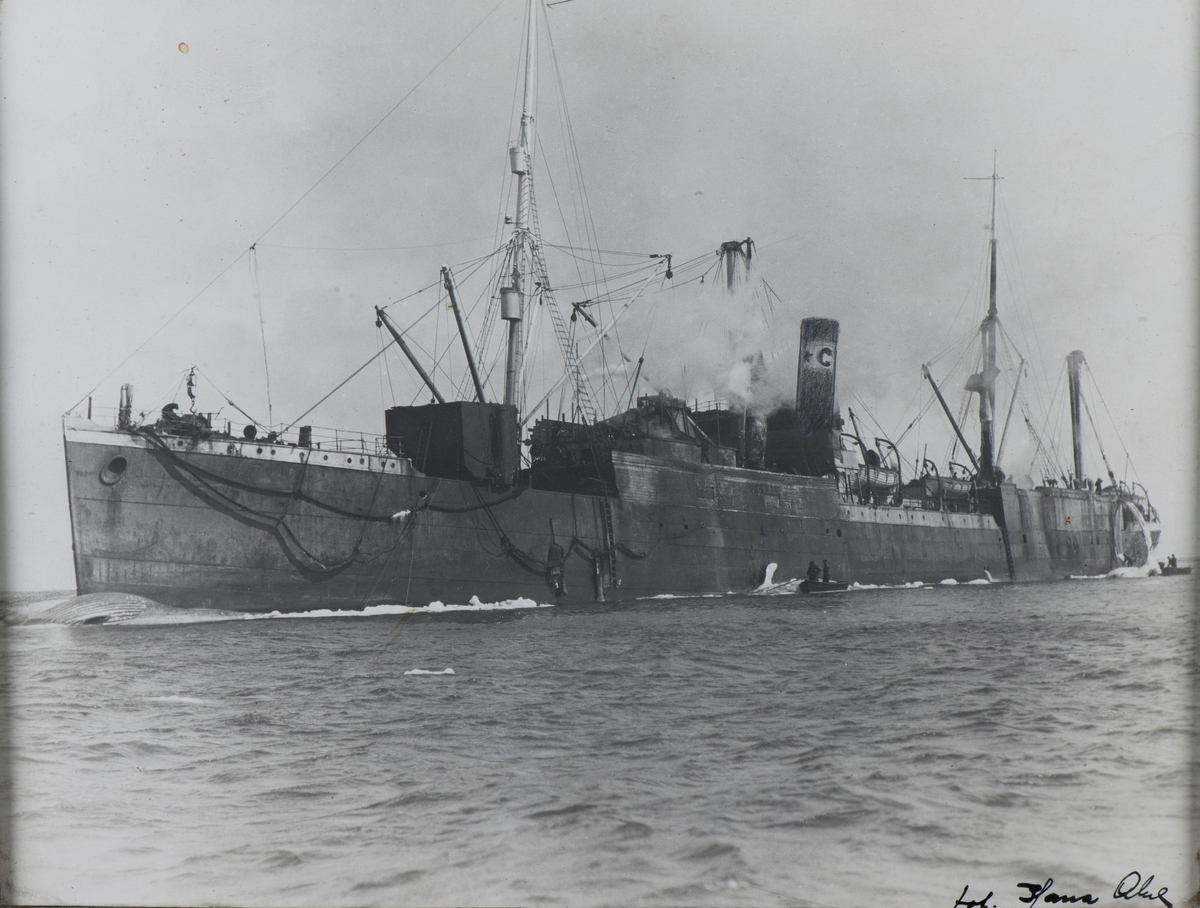
Thor I (launched as Imaum)

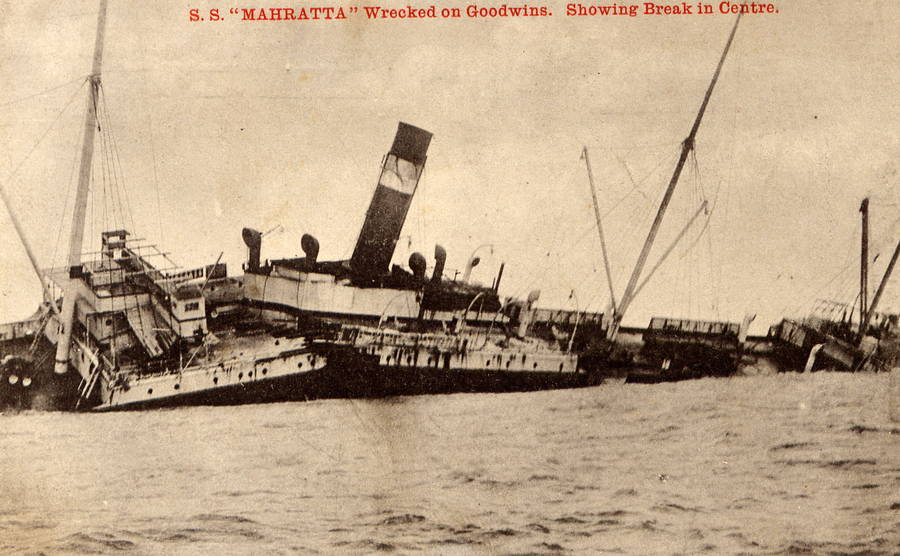
Wreck of Mahratta

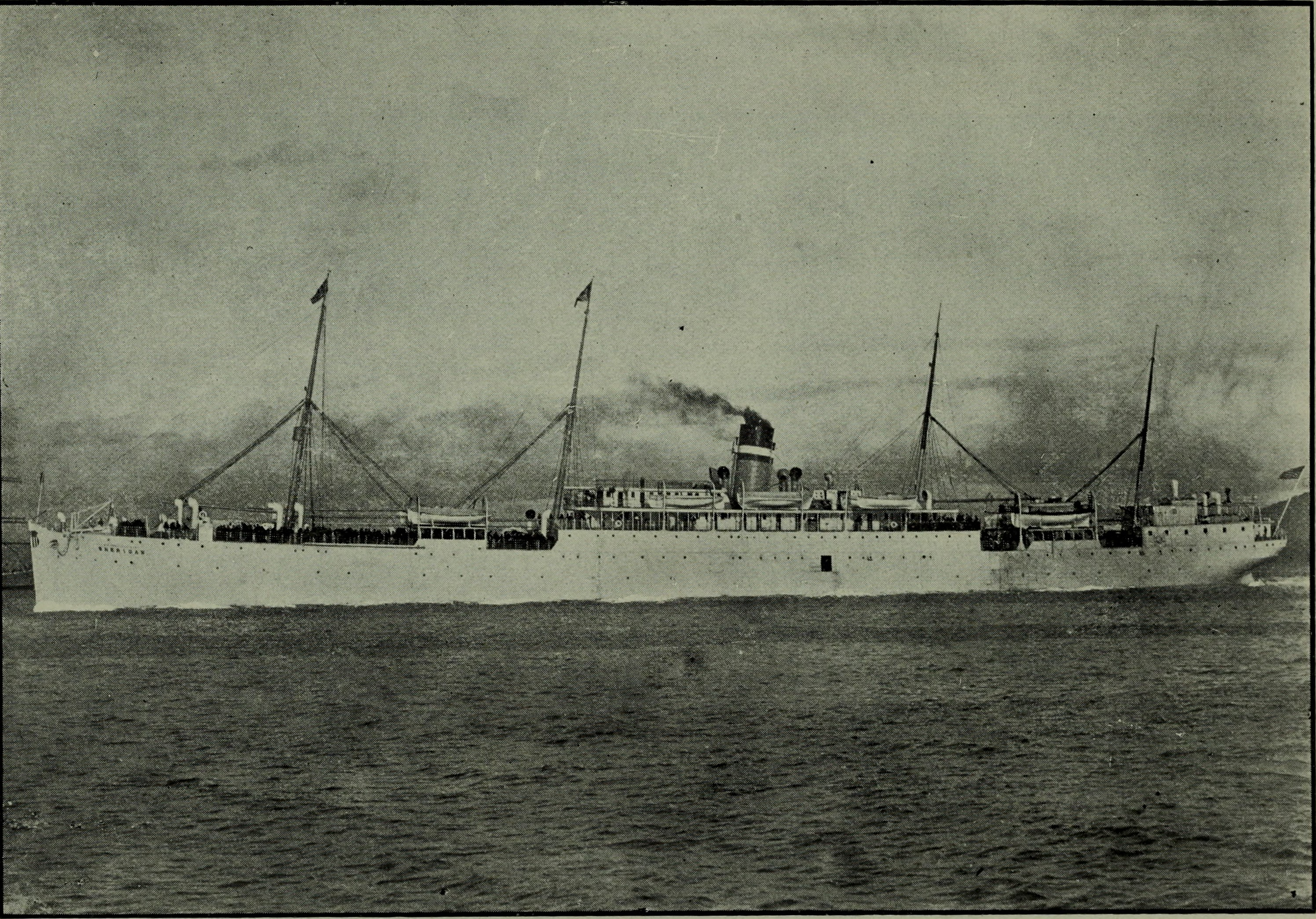
USAT Sheridan (launched as Massachusetts)

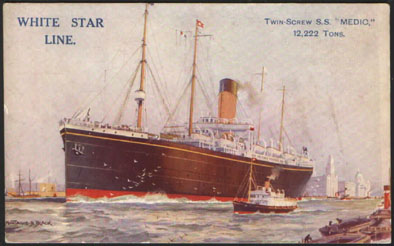
Medic

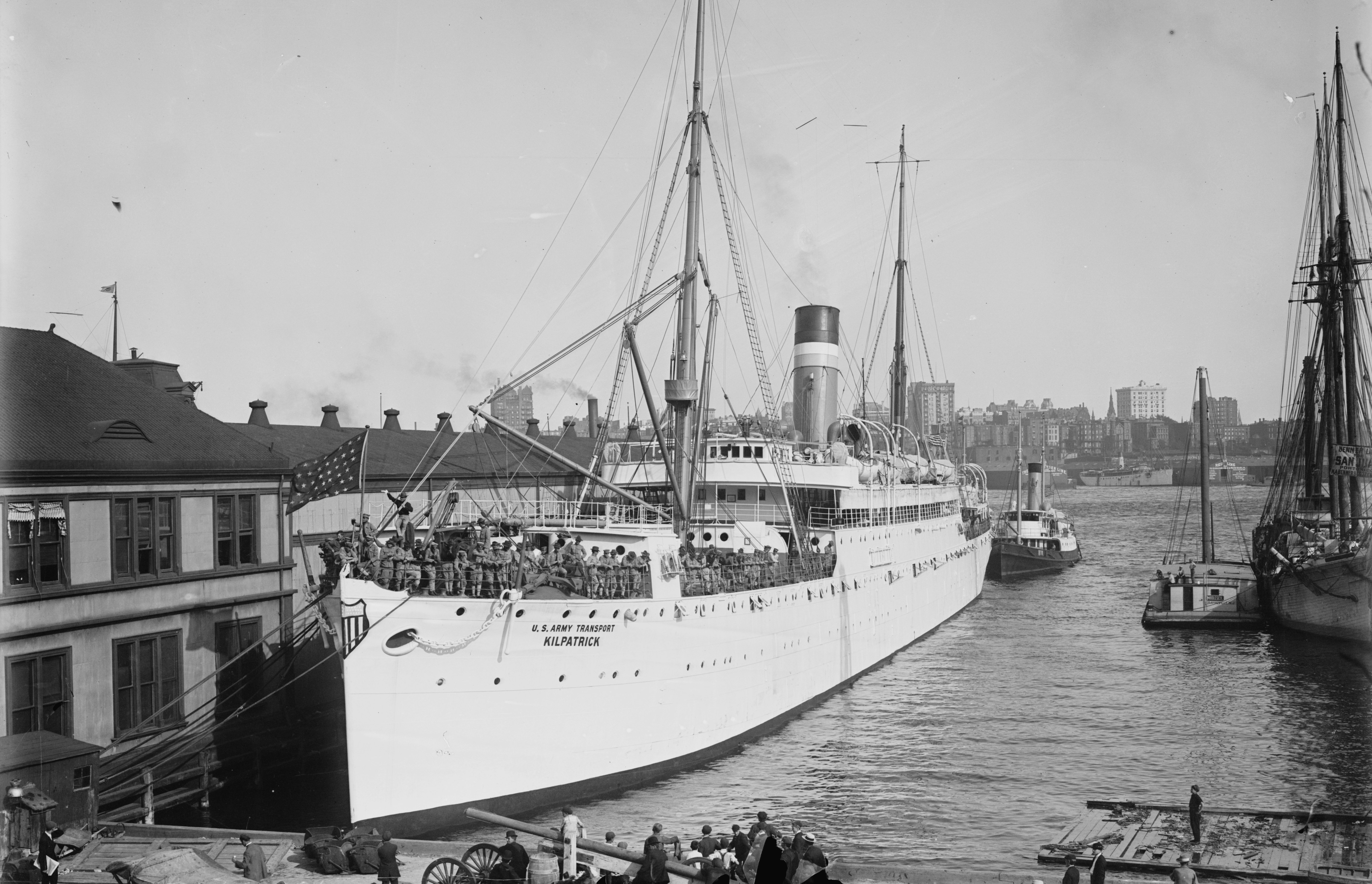
USAT Kilpatrick (launched as Michigan)

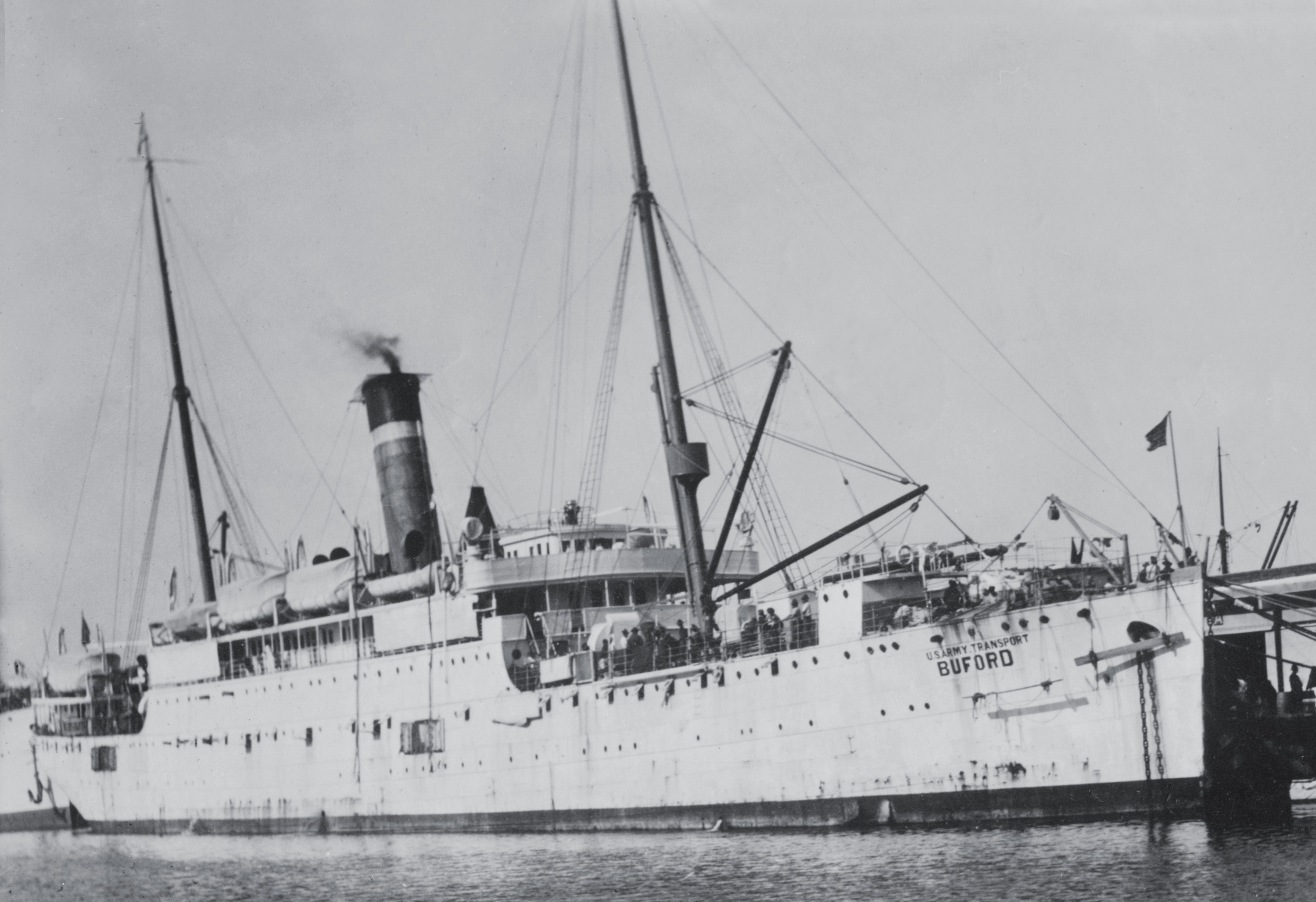
USAT Buford (launched as Mississippi)

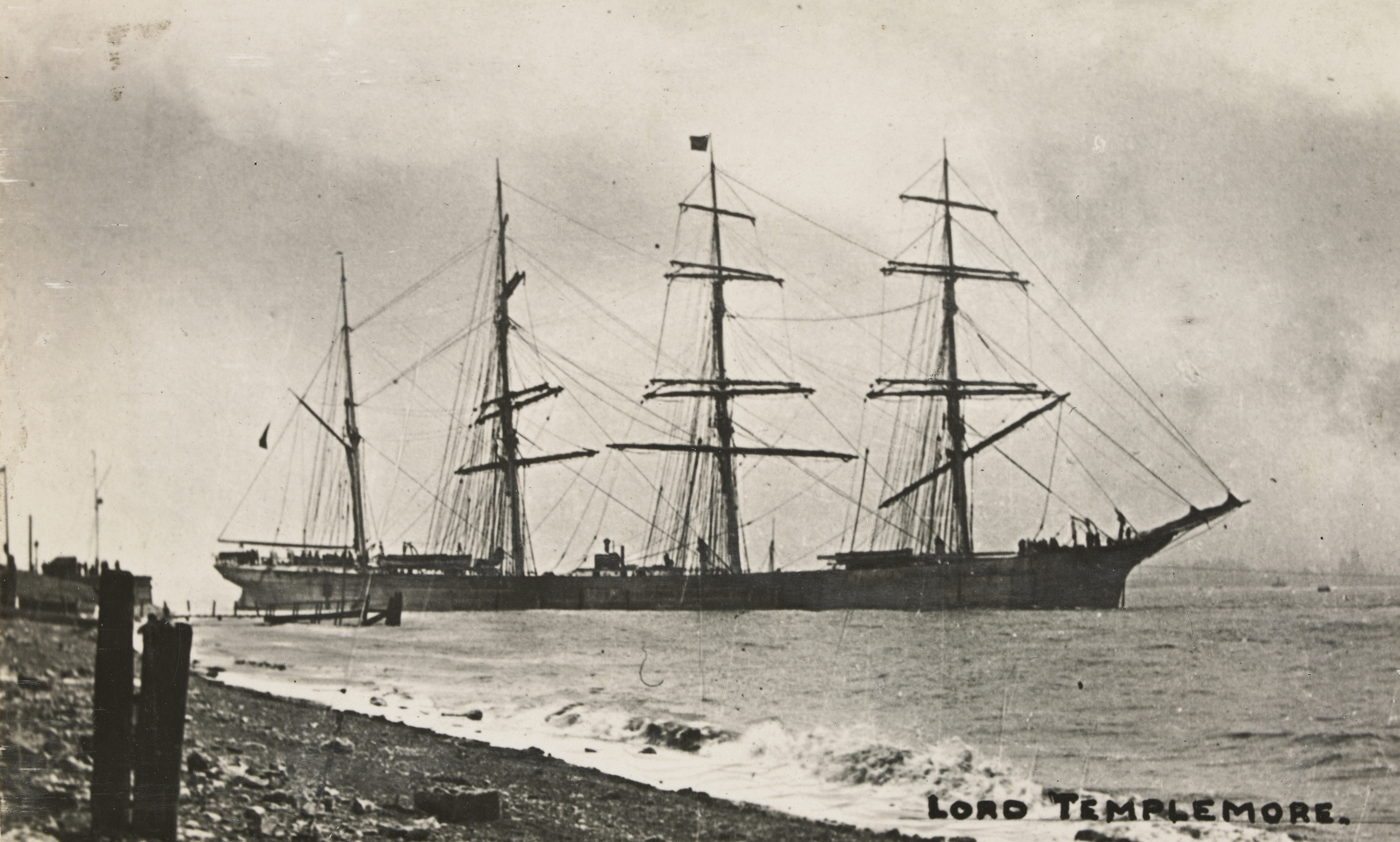
Lord Templemore

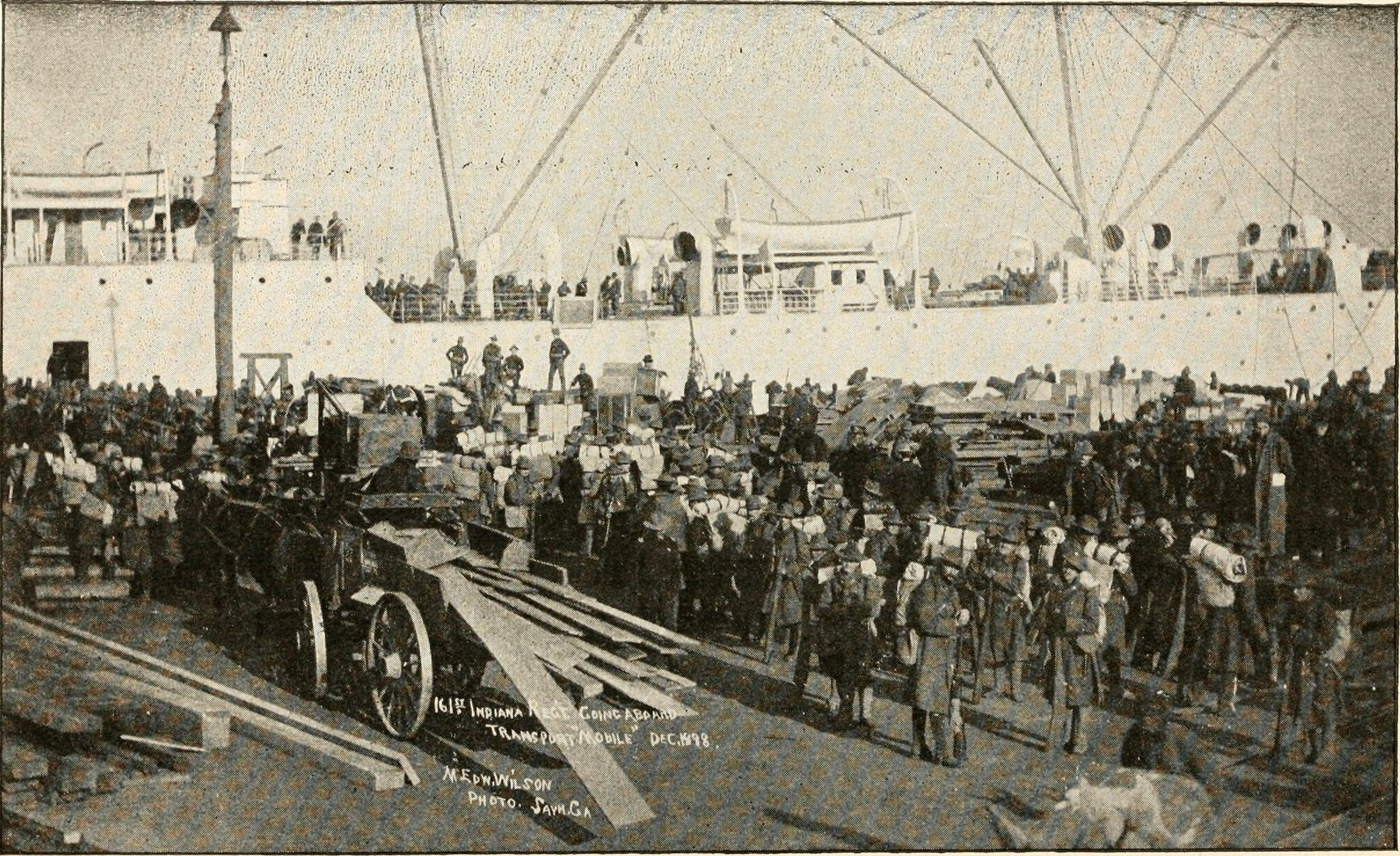
Mobile

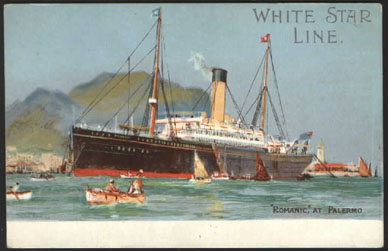
Romanic (launched as New England)

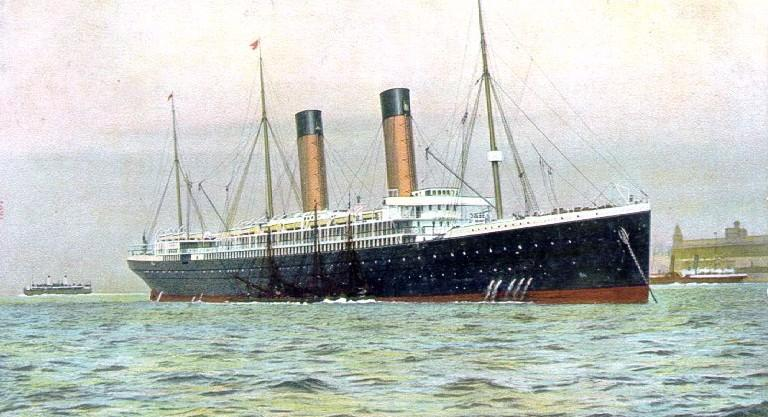
Oceanic

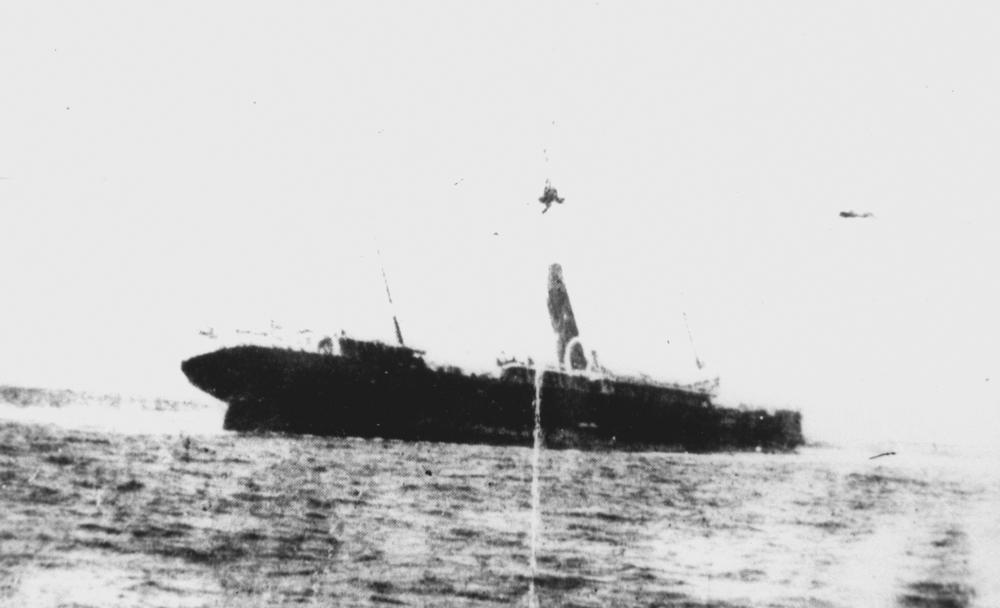
Oravia

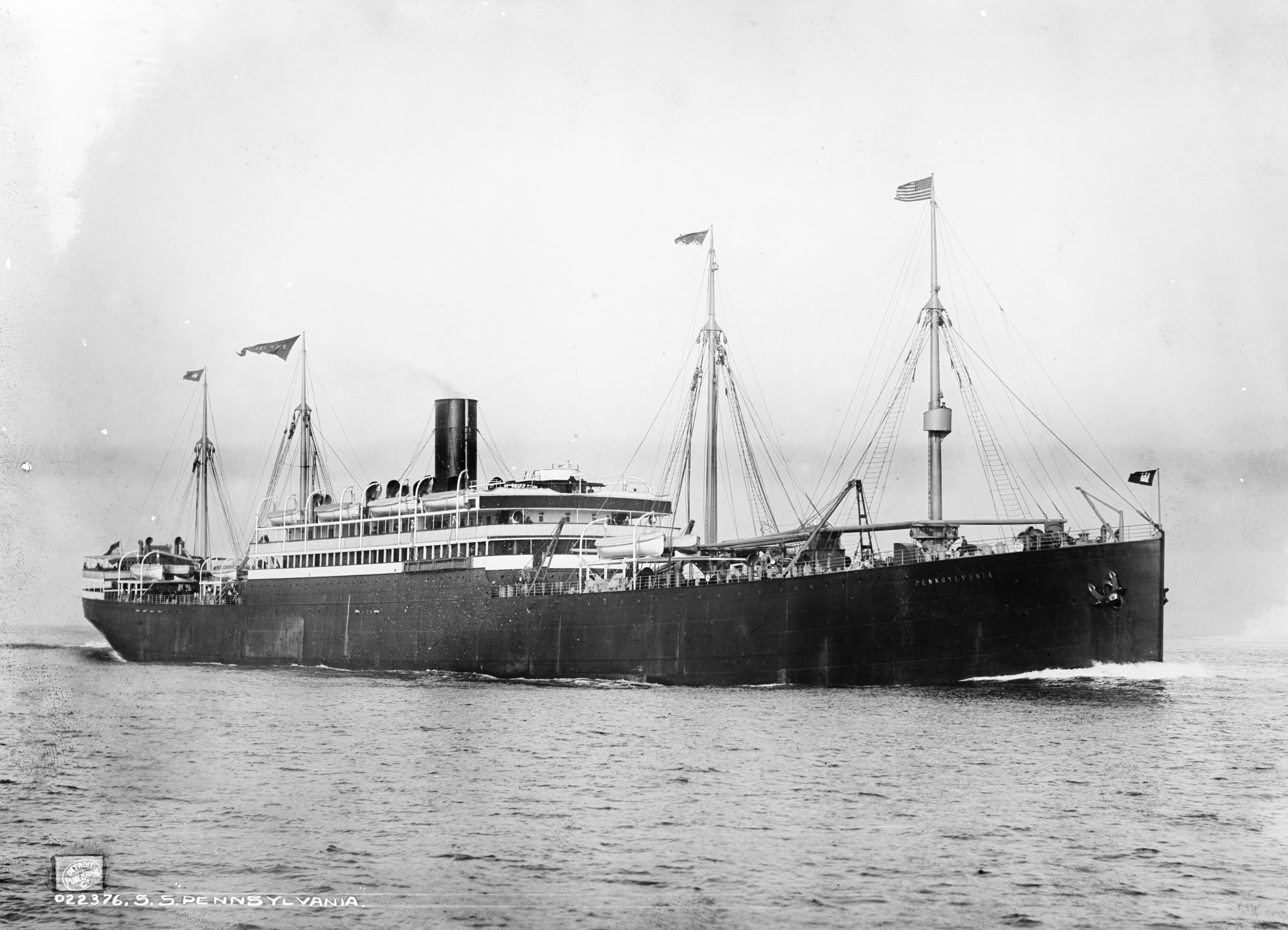
Pennsylvania

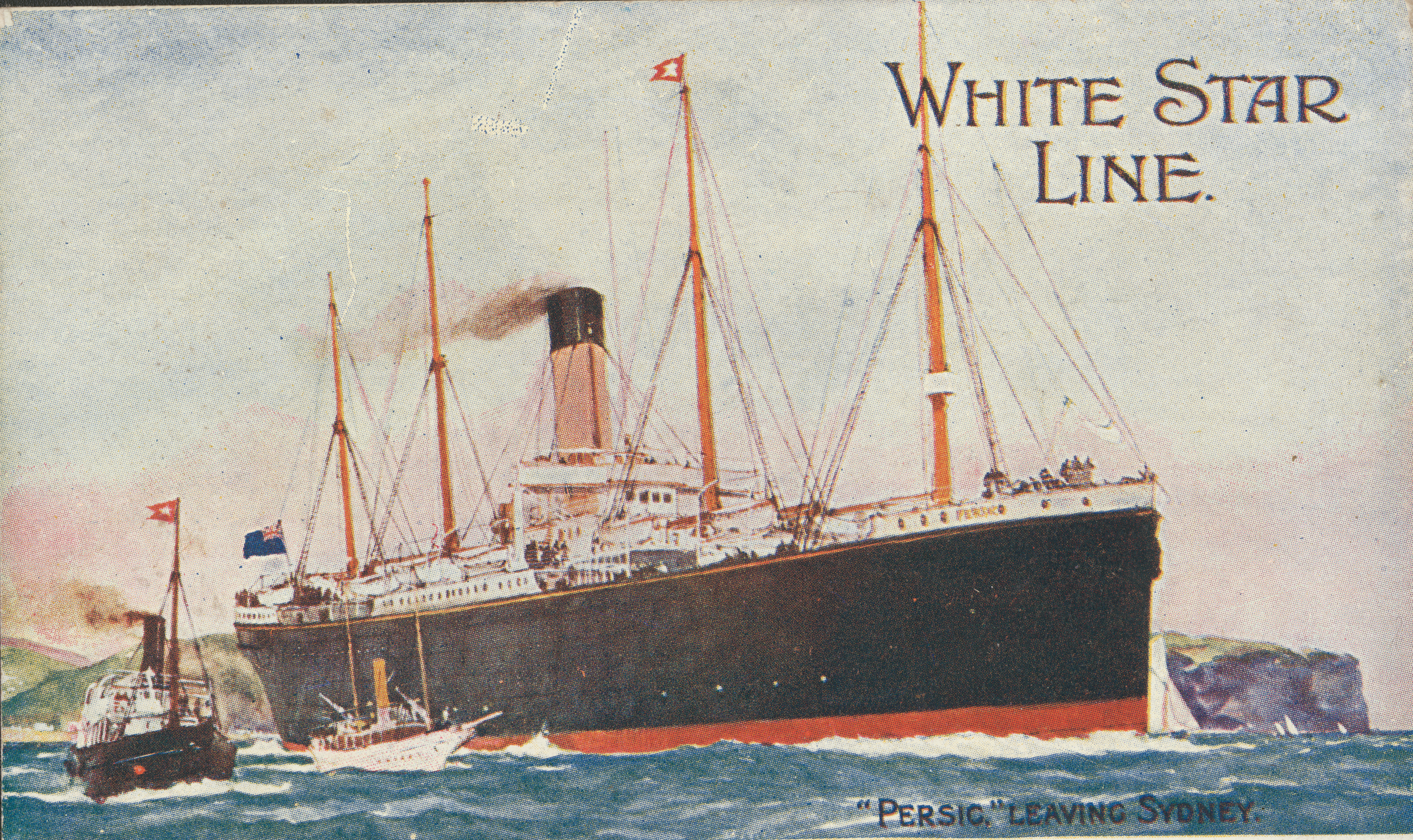
Persic

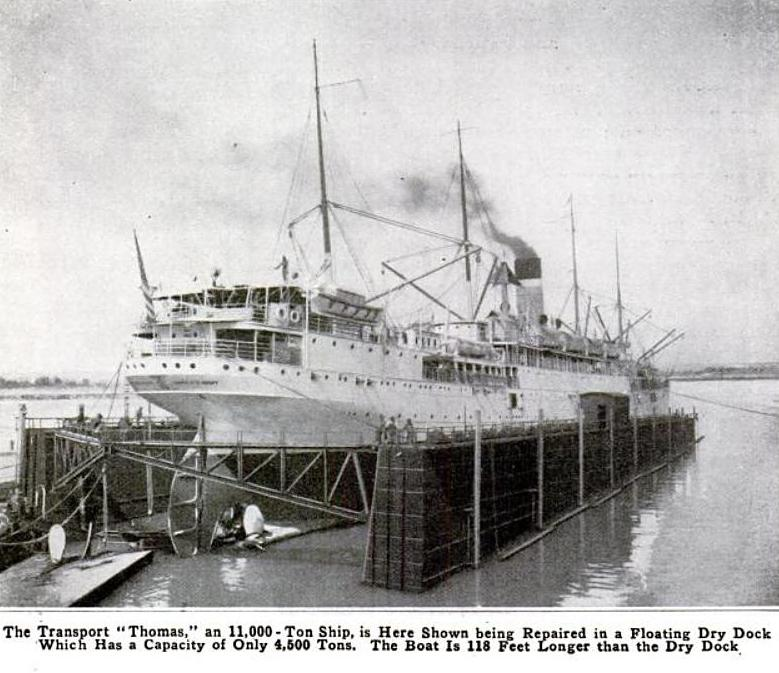
USAT Thomas (launched as Persia)

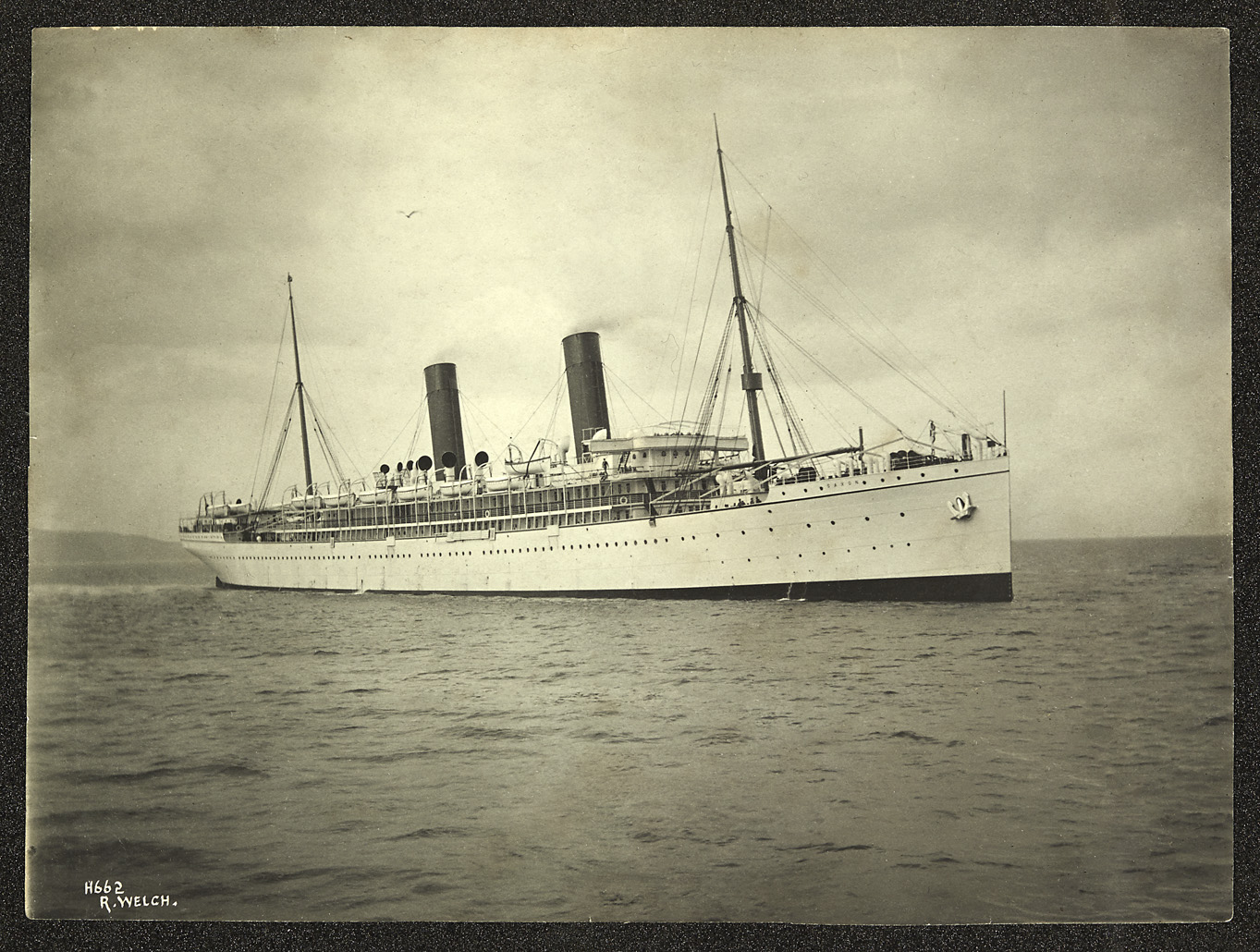
Saxon

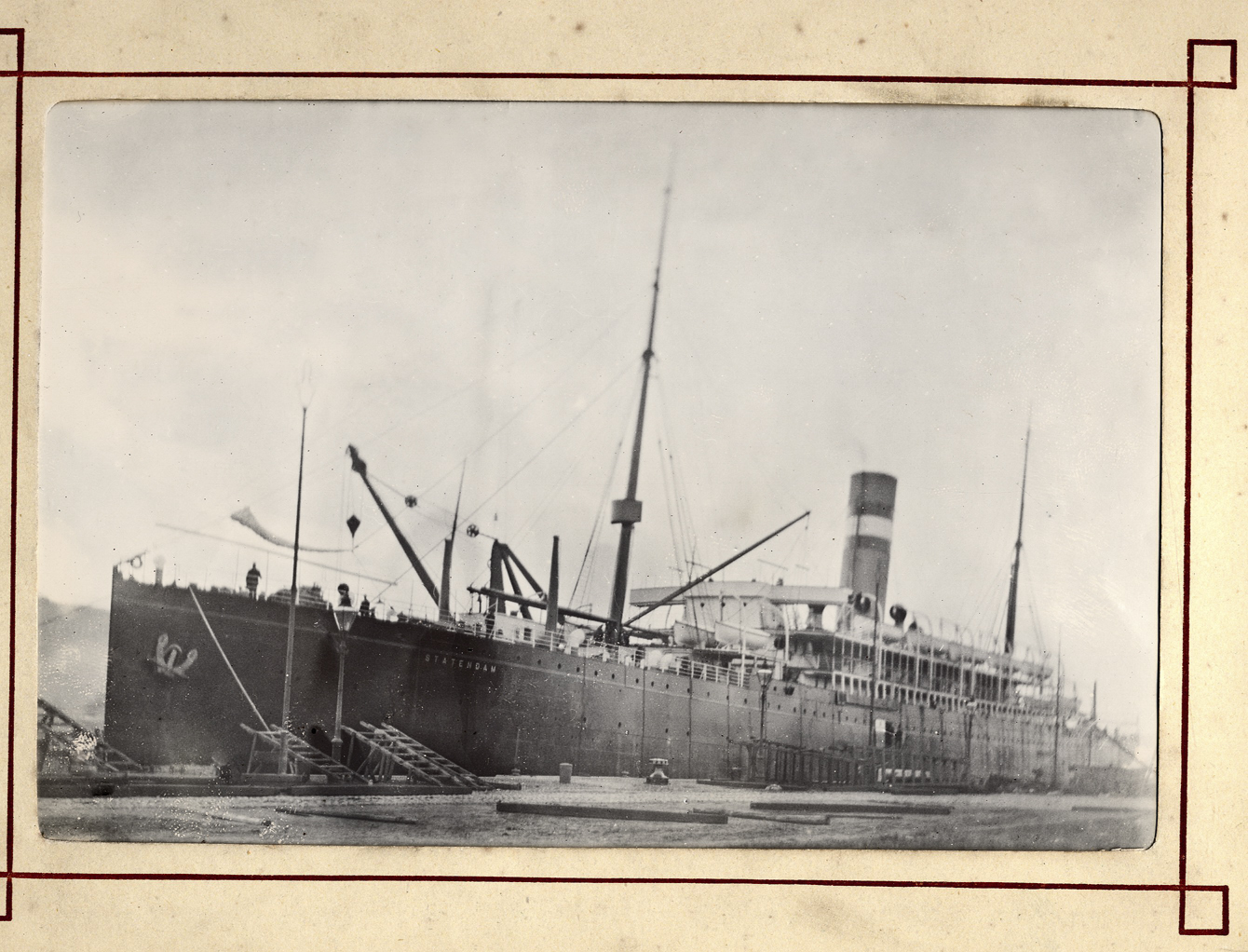
Statendam

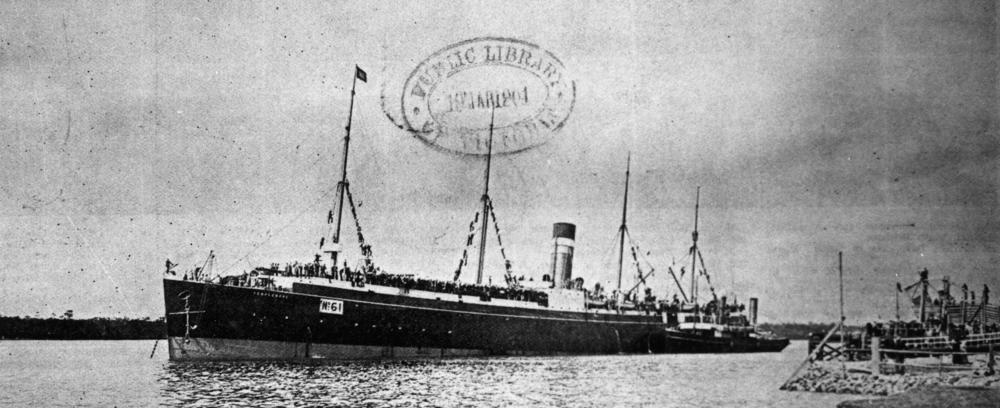
Templemore

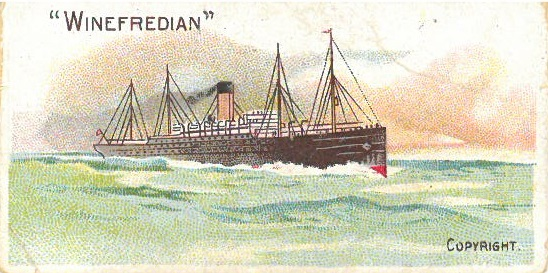
Winifredian

== 1900s ==
- SS Minnehaha, passenger ship for Atlantic Transport Co, launched 31 March 1900, completed 7 July 1900, torpedoed and sunk 7 September 1917.
- SS Devonian, passenger ship for F Leyland & Co, launched 2 April 1900, completed 6 September 1900.
- SS Runic, passenger ship for White Star Line, launched 3 April 1900, completed 22 December 1900, renamed New Sevilla 1930, torpedoed and sunk 1940
- SS Galician, passenger ship for Union Steamship Co, launched 20 September 1900, completed 6 December 1900.
- SS Commonwealth, passenger ship for Richard Mills & Co, launched 31 May 1900, completed 22 September 1900, maiden voyage 4 October 1900, renamed Canopic 1904
- SS Suevic, passenger ship for White Star Line, launched 8 December 1900, completed 9 March 1901, maiden voyage 23 March 1901, renamed Skytteren 1928, scuttled 1942.
- RMS Celtic, passenger ship for White Star Line, launched 4 April 1901, completed 11 July 1901, maiden voyage 26 July 1901, wrecked 10 December 1928.
- SS Ryndam, passenger ship for Holland America Line, launched 18 May 1901, completed 3 October 1901, renamed USS Rijndam 1918, scrapped 1929.
- RMS Walmer Castle, passenger ship for Union-Castle Line, launched on 6 July 1901, completed 20 February 1902, scrapped 1932.
- SS Athenic, passenger ship for White Star Line, launched 17 August 1901, completed 23 January 1902, maiden voyage 13 February 1902, renamed Pelagos 1928, scrapped 1962.
- SS Noordam, passenger ship for Holland America Line, launched 28 September 1901, completed 29 March 1902, maiden voyage 1 May 1902, renamed Kungsholm, scrapped 1927.
- SS Warwickshire, passenger ship for Bibby Steamship Co, launched 28 November 1901, completed 6 March 1902.
- SS Minnetonka, passenger ship for Atlantic Transport Co, launched 12 December 1901, completed 17 May 1902, maiden voyage 1902, torpedoed and sunk January 1918.
- SS Corinthic, passenger ship for White Star Line, launched 10 April 1902, completed 14 July 1902, maiden voyage 20 November 1902, scrapped 1932.
- SS Ionic, passenger ship for White Star Line, launched 22 May 1902, completed 15 December 1902, maiden voyage 16 January 1903, scrapped 1936.
- SS Iowa, livestock/cargo transport for George Warren & Co, launched 15 August 1902, completed 11 November 1902, renamed Bohemia 1912, Artemis 1917—1941 and Empire Bittern 1941, sunk breakwater ship July 1944.
- RMS Cedric, passenger ship for White Star Line, launched 21 August 1902, completed 31 January 1903, maiden voyage 11 February 1903, scrapped 1932.
- SS Orita, passenger ship for PSNC, launched 15 November 1902, completed 26 March 1903.
- SS Arabic, passenger ship for White Star Line, launched 18 December 1902, completed 21 June 1903, maiden voyage 26 June 1903, torpedoed and sunk 19 August 1915.
- SS Columbus, passenger ship for Richard Mills & Co, launched 26 February 1903, completed 12 September 1903, maiden voyage October 1903, renamed RMS Republic 1903, rammed and sunk January 1909.
- SS Marmora, passenger ship for P&O, launched 9 April 1903, completed 19 November 1903.
- SS Macedonia, passenger ship for P&O, launched 9 July 1903, completed 28 January 1904.
- RMS Baltic, passenger ship for White Star Line, launched 21 November 1903, completed 23 June 1904, maiden voyage 29 June 1904, scrapped 1933.
- SS President Lincoln, passenger ship for Hamburg America Line, launched 8 October 1903, completed 14 May 1907, renamed USS President Lincoln 1917, torpedoed and sunk 31 May 1918.
- HMS Enchantress, yacht for British Admiralty, launched 7 November 1903, completed 11 June 1904.
- RMS Kenilworth Castle, passenger ship for Union Castle, launched 15 December 1903, completed 19 May 1904, scrapped 1936.
- SS Servian, passenger ship for Hamburg America Line, launched 19 December 1903, completed 3 September 1907 as President Grant, renamed USS President Grant (SP-3014) 1917, USAT Republic 1921 and USS Republic 1941, scrapped 1952.
- SS Worcestershire, passenger ship for Bibby Steamship Co, launched 3 March 1904, completed 17 September 1904.
- SS Amerika, passenger ship for Hamburg America Line, launched 20 April 1905, completed 21 September 1905, renamed USS America 1917, USAT America 1919, SS America 1920 and USAT Edmund B Alexander 1940, scrapped 1957.
- SS Dunluce Castle, passenger ship for Union Castle, launched 31 March 1904, completed 15 September 1904, sold for scrapping in 1939, instead to British Admiralty for use as accommodation ship.
- TSS Slievemore, ferry for London & North Western Railway, launched 17 May 1904, completed 17 October 1904, scrapped 1932.
- SS Pardo, cargo ship for Royal Mail Line, launched 30 June 1904, completed 1 October 1904.
- SS Potaro, cargo ship for Royal Mail Line, launched 10 September 1904, completed 8 December 1904.
- SS Mamari, passenger ship for Shaw, Savill & Albion Line, launched 24 September 1904, completed 3 December 1904, maiden voyage 15 December 1904.
- RMS Aragon, passenger ship for Royal Mail Line, launched 23 February 1905, completed 22 June 1905, maiden voyage 14 July 1905, renamed HMT Aragon, sunk by torpedo 1917.
- SS Bologna, passenger ship for Hamburg America Line, launched 9 March 1905, completed 25 May 1905.
- SS Maharonda, cargo ship for T&J Brocklebank, launched 17 June 1905, completed 3 August 1905.
- TSS Slieve Bawn, ferry for London & North Western Railway, launched 6 July 1905, completed 10 October 1905, scrapped 1935.
- SS Herefordshire, passenger ship for Bibby Steamship Co, launched 31 August 1905, completed 29 November 1905.
- SS Nieuw Amsterdam, passenger ship for Holland America Line, launched 28 September 1905, completed 22 February 1906, maiden voyage 7 April 1906, scrapped February 1932.
- SS Malakand, cargo ship for T&J Brocklebank, launched 11 November 1905, completed 14 December 1905.
- SS Manipur, cargo ship for T&J Brocklebank, launched 14 December 1905, completed 13 January 1906, renamed HMS Sandhurst, scrapped 1947.
- RMS Amazon, passenger ship for Royal Mail Line, launched 24 February 1906, completed 5 June 1906.
- SS Ortega, cargo ship for PSNC, launched 22 March 1906, completed 28 June 1906.
- SS Matheran, cargo ship for T&J Brocklebank, launched 12 April 1906, completed 12 May 1906.
- SS Oronsa, cargo ship for PSNC, launched 24 May 1905, completed 16 August 1906.
- SS Heroic, ferry for Belfast Steamship Co, launched 13 January 1906, completed 23 April 1906.
- SS Graphic, ferry for Belfast Steamship Co, launched 27 February 1906, completed 19 May 1906.
- SS Salamanca, cargo ship for Hamburg America Line, launched 5 July 1906, completed 15 September 1906.
- SS Rohilla, cargo ship for British-India Steam Navigation Co, launched 6 September 1906, completed 17 November 1906, wrecked 30 October 1914.
- RMS Adriatic, passenger ship for White Star Line, launched on 20 September 1906, completed 25 April 1907, maiden voyage 8 May 1907, scrapped 1935.
- SS Aburi, cargo ship for Elder Dempster, launched 18 October 1906, completed 2 January 1907.
- SS Sierra Leone, cargo ship for Elder Dempster, launched 15 November 1906, completed 8 January 1907.
- SS Fulani, cargo ship for Elder Dempster, launched 31 January 1907, completed 1 June 1907.
- SS Avon, passenger ship for Royal Mail Line, launched 2 March 1907, completed 15 June 1907.
- SS Prashu, cargo ship for Elder Dempster, launched 29 March 1907, completed 29 June 1907.
- SS Iroquois, oil tanker for Anglo American Oil Co, launched 27 June 1907, completed 19 October 1907, scrapped 1947.
- RMS Asturias, passenger ship for Royal Mail Line, launched 26 September 1907, completed 8 January 1908.
- Navahoe, schooner oil barge for Anglo American Oil Co, launched 10 October 1907, completed 18 January 1908, scuttled 1936.
- SS Median, cargo ship for F Leyland & Co, launched 5 December 1907, completed 25 January 1908.
- SS Pericles, passenger ship for Aberdeen Line, launched 21 December 1907, completed 4 June 1908, maiden voyage 8 July 1908, wrecked 31 March 1910.
- SS Memphian, cargo ship for F Leyland & Co, launched 23 January 1908, completed 20 February 1908.
- SS Rotterdam, passenger ship for Holland America Line launched 3 March 1908, completed 3 June 1908, scrapped 1940.
- SS Mercian, cargo ship for Furness Leyland Line, launched 16 April 1908, completed 16 May 1908.
- SS Lapland, passenger ship for Red Star Line, launched 27 June 1908, completed 27 March 1909, maiden voyage 10 April 1909, scrapped 1934.
- SS Léopoldville, passenger ship for Compagnie Belge Maritime du Congo, launched 13 August 1908, completed 10 November 1908, renamed SS Absini.
- SS Laurentic, passenger ship for White Star Line, launched 10 September 1908, completed 15 April 1909, maiden voyage 29 April 1909, sunk by mines 25 January 1917.
- SS Minnewaska, passenger ship for Atlantic Transport Co, launched 12 November 1908, completed 24 April 1909, maiden voyage 1909, mined 29 November 1916.
- SS Megantic, passenger ship for White Star Line, launched 10 December 1908, completed 3 June 1909, maiden voyage 17 June 1909, scrapped 1933.
- SS Karoola, passenger ship for McIlwraith, McEacharn & Co, launched 9 March 1909, completed 8 July 1909.
- SS Mallina, cargo ship for Australasian Steam Navigation Co, launched 25 March 1909, completed 29 April 1909, renamed HMAS Mallina 1914, Mallina 1915, Seiko Maru 1929 and Siberia Maru 1935, bombed and sunk 24 September 1944.
- SS Berbice, cargo ship for Royal Mail Line, launched 6 May 1909, completed 8 July 1909.
- SS Leicestershire, passenger ship for Bibby Steamship Co, launched 3 June 1909, completed 11 September 1909, maiden voyage 23 September 1909, renamed British Exhibitor and Zamzam, sunk by German raider in April 1941.
- SS Meltonian, cargo ship for Furness Leyland Line, launched 8 July 1909, completed 17 August 1909.
- SS Balantia, cargo ship for Royal Mail Line, launched 28 October 1909, completed 18 December 1909.
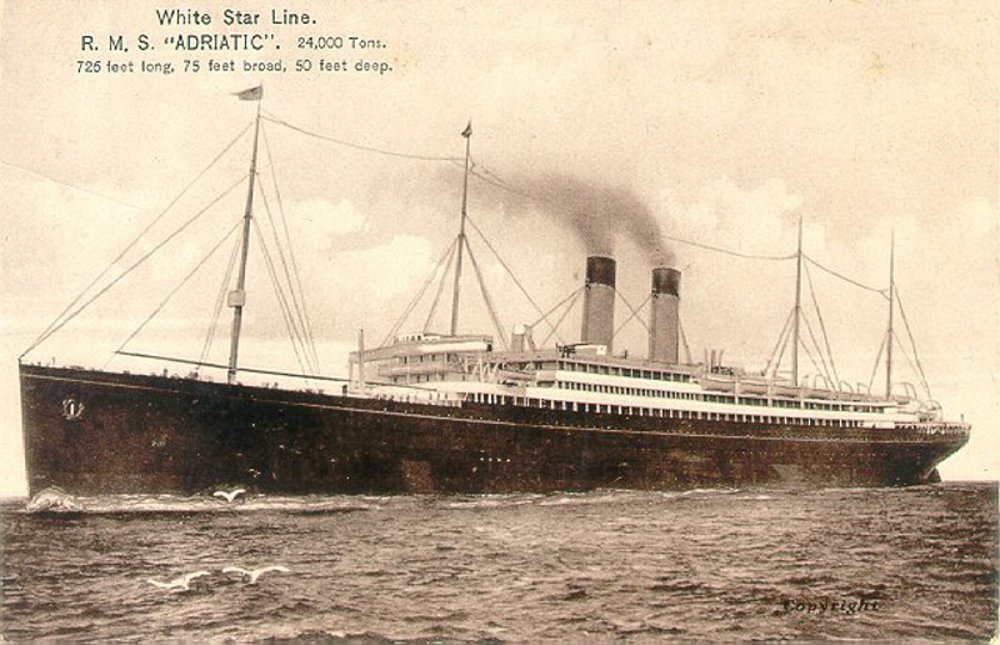
RMS Adriatic

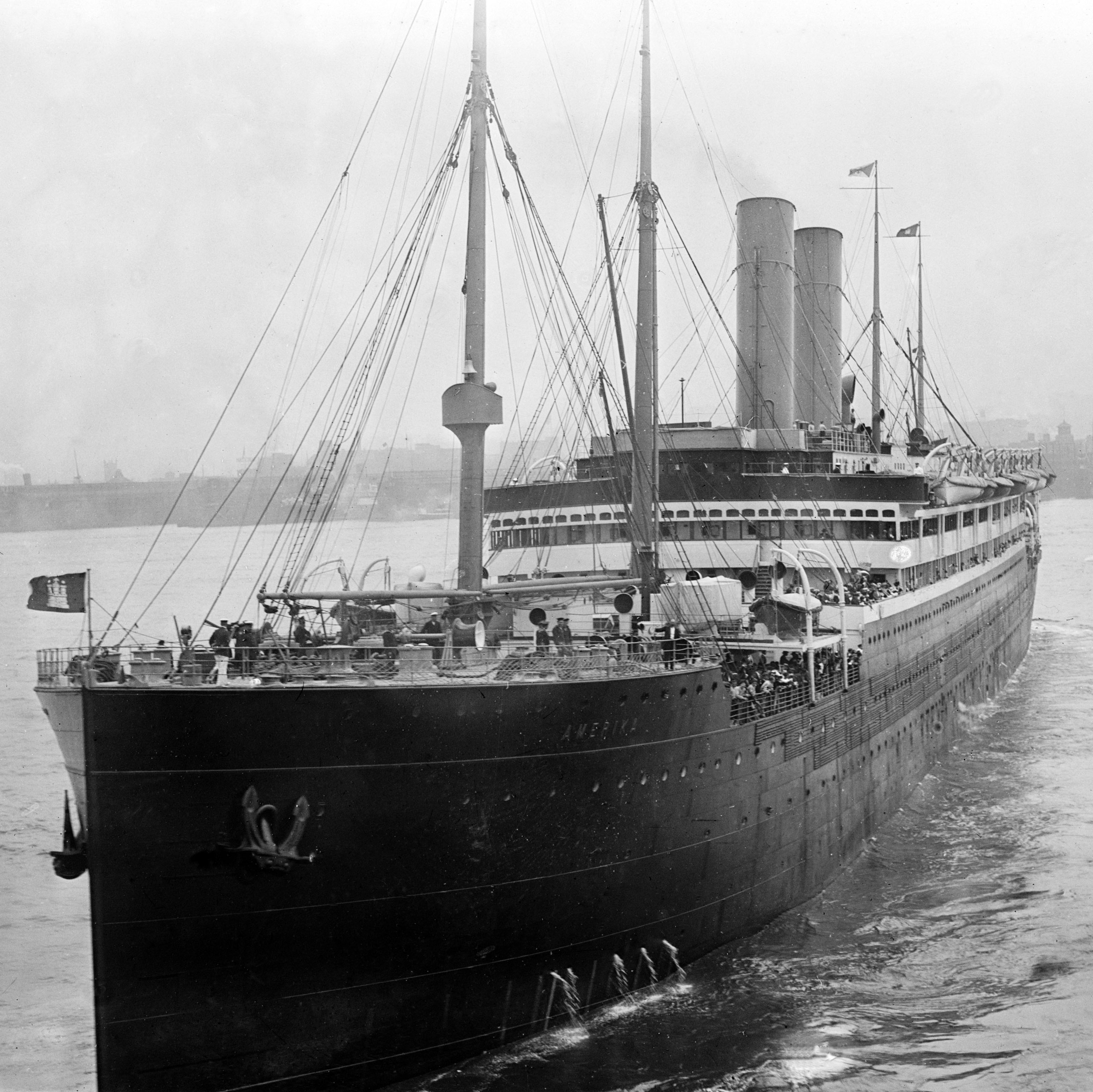
Amerika

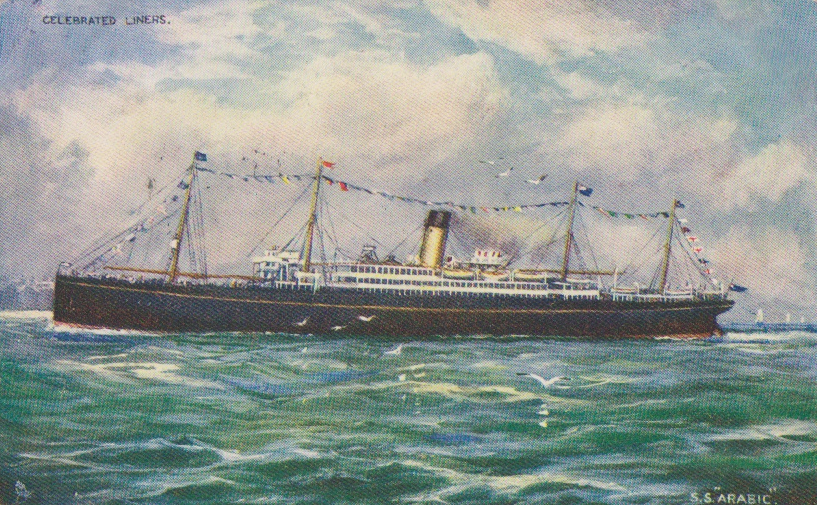
Arabic

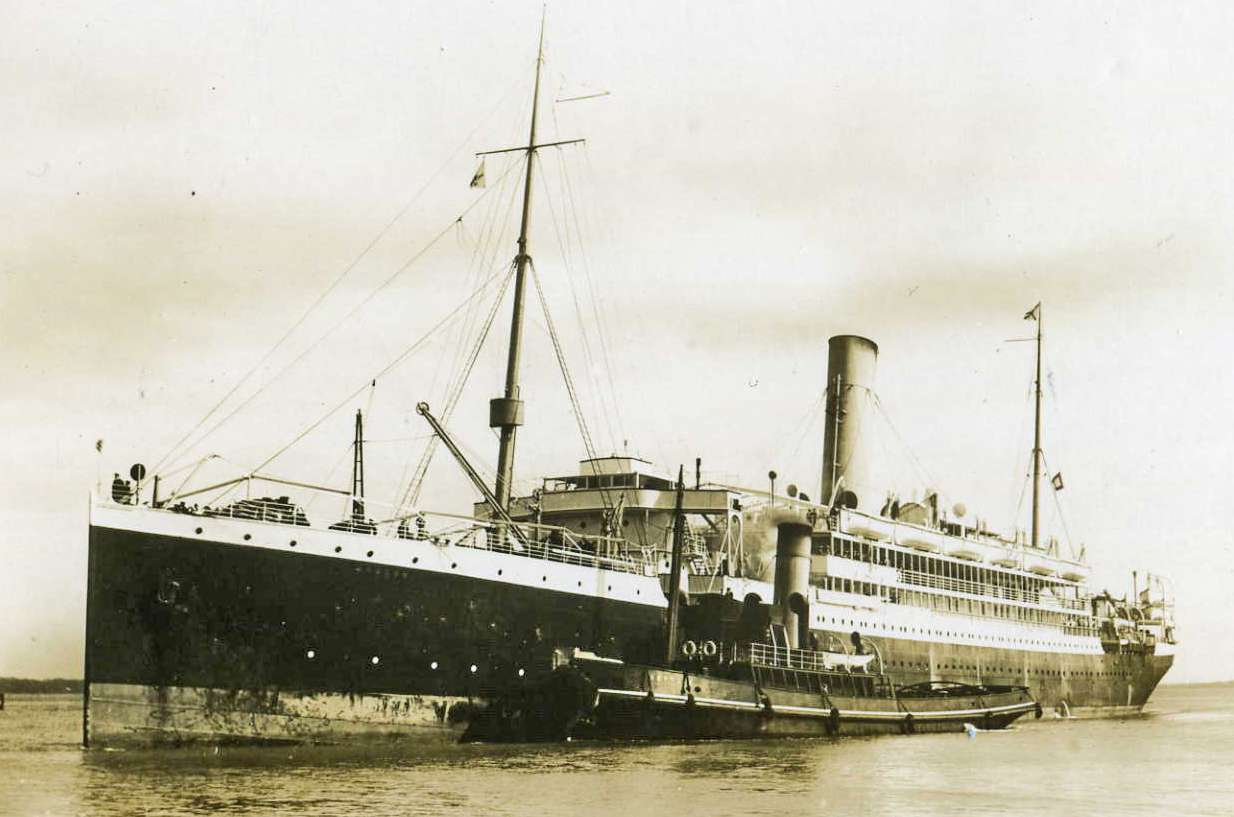
RMS Aragon

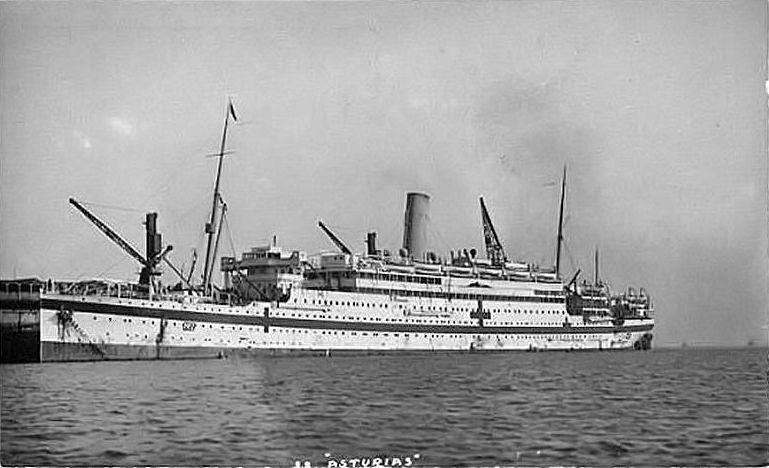
HMHS Asturias

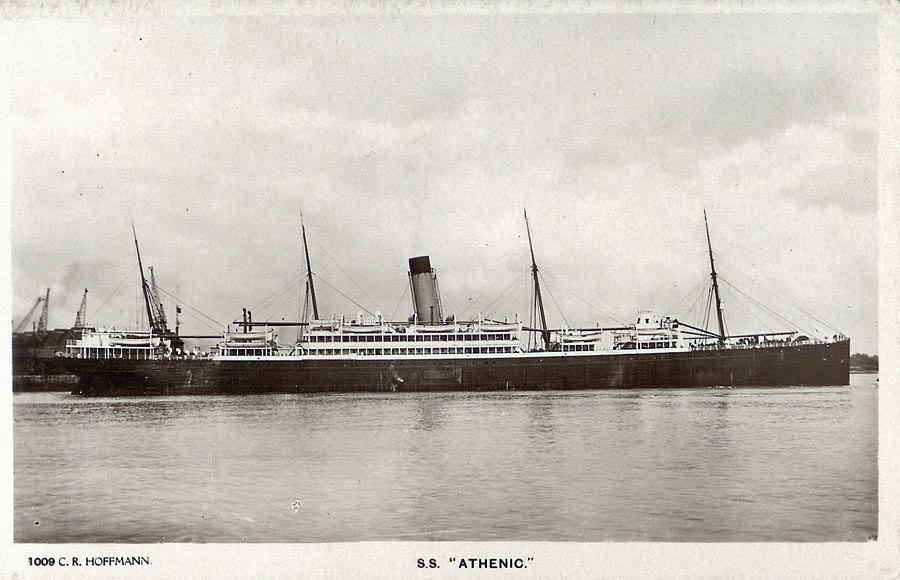
Athenic

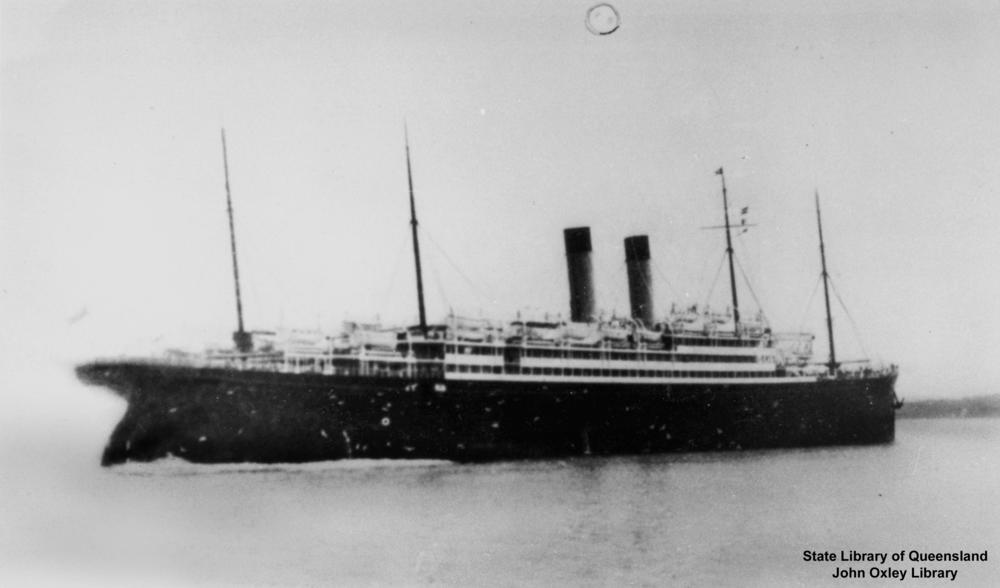
Baltic

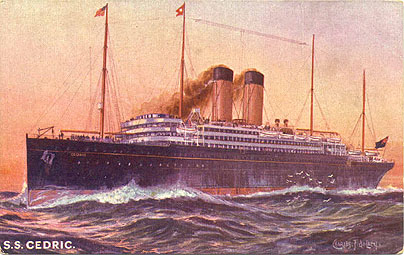
RMS Cedric

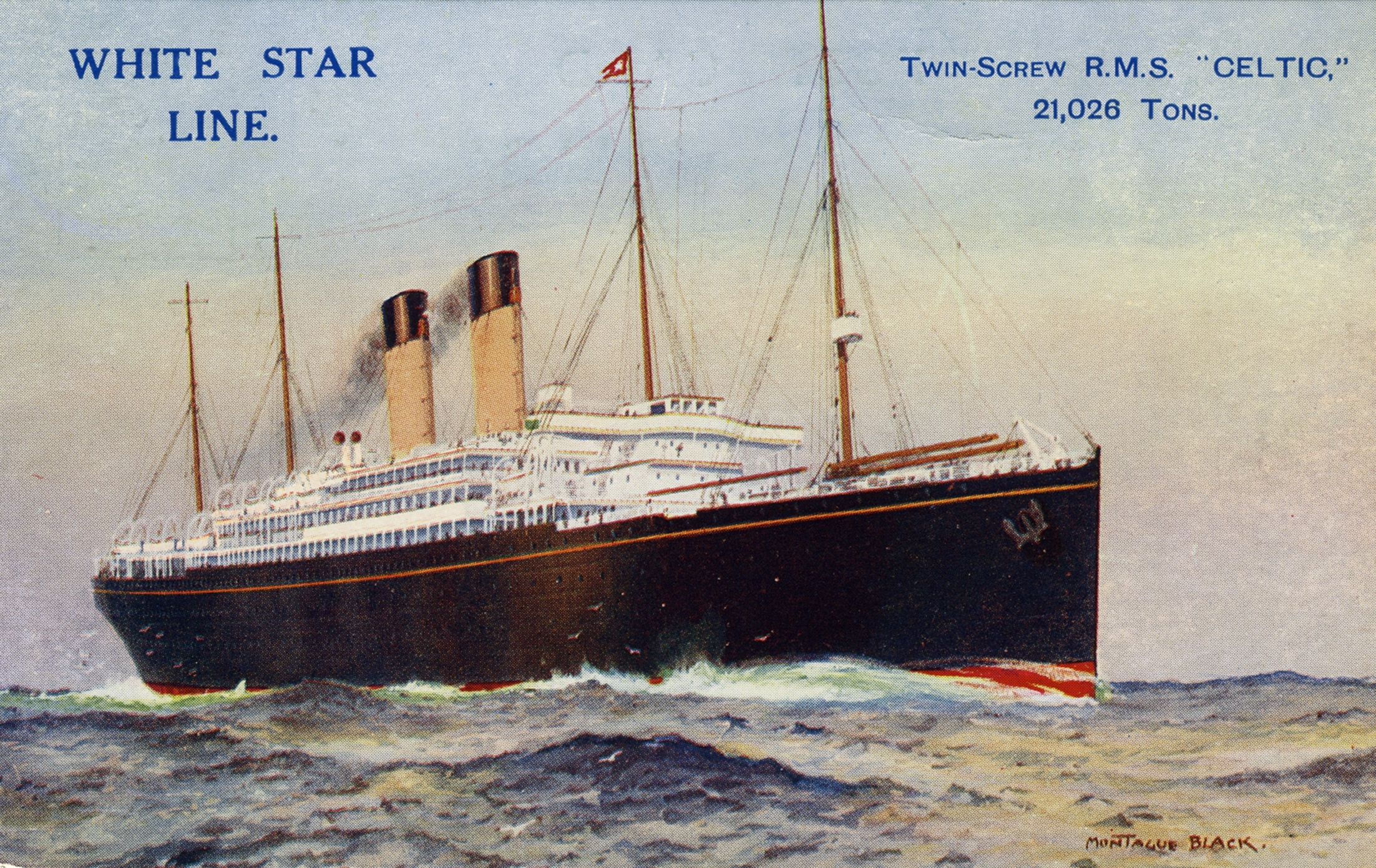
RMS Celtic

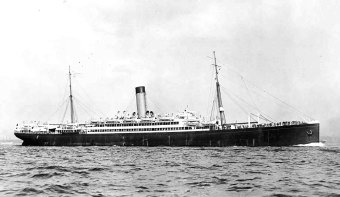
Canopic (launched as Commonwealth)

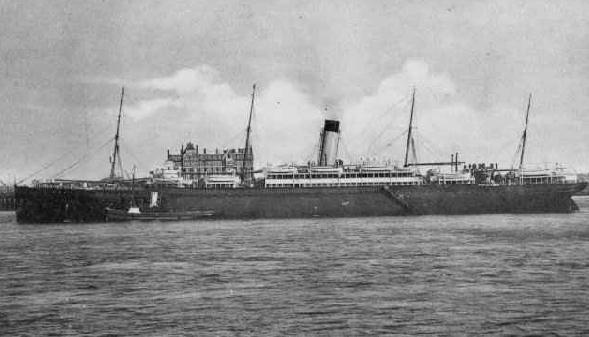
Corinthic

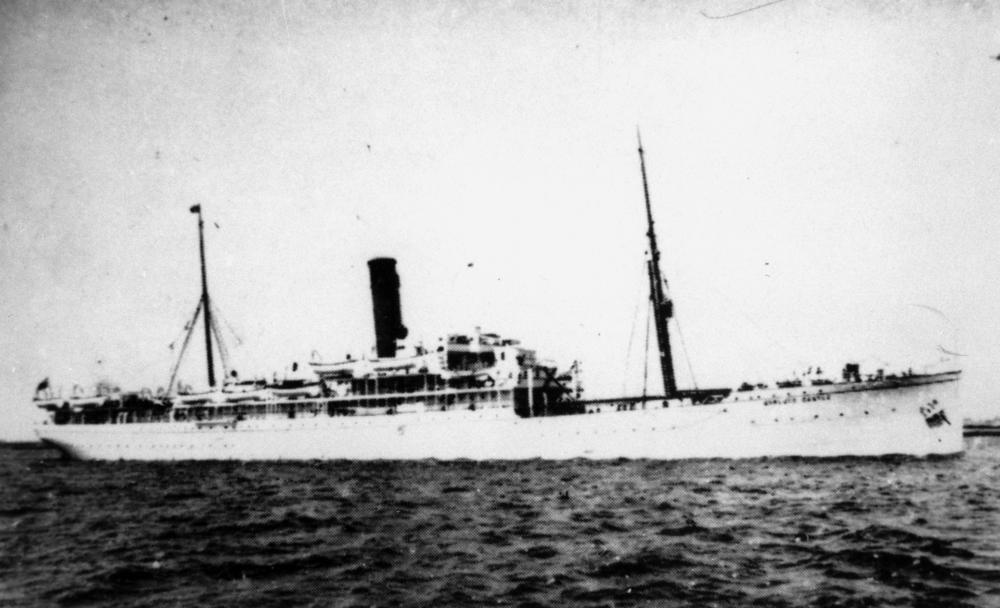
Dunluce Castle

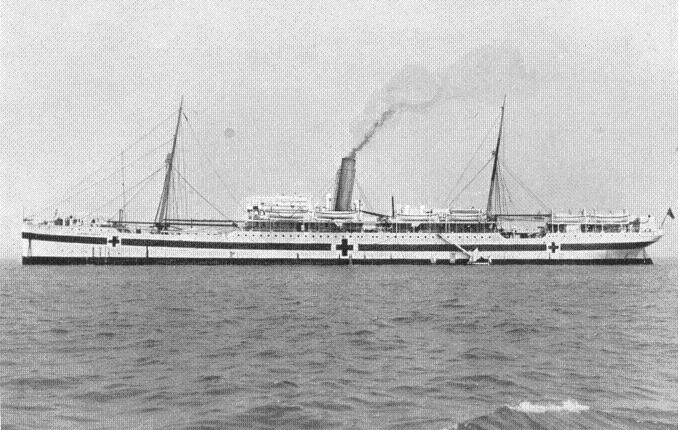
HMHS Glenart Castle (launched as Galician)

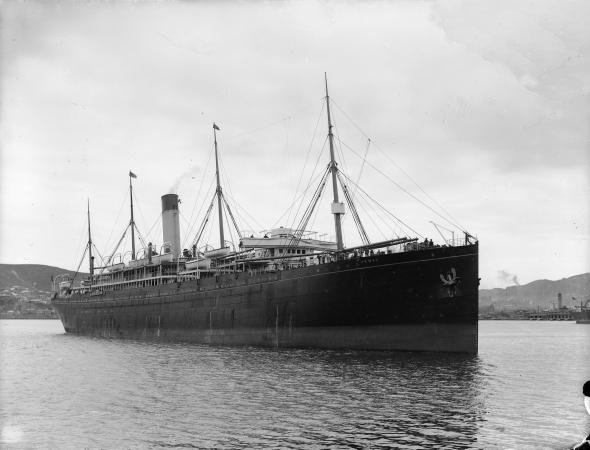
Ionic

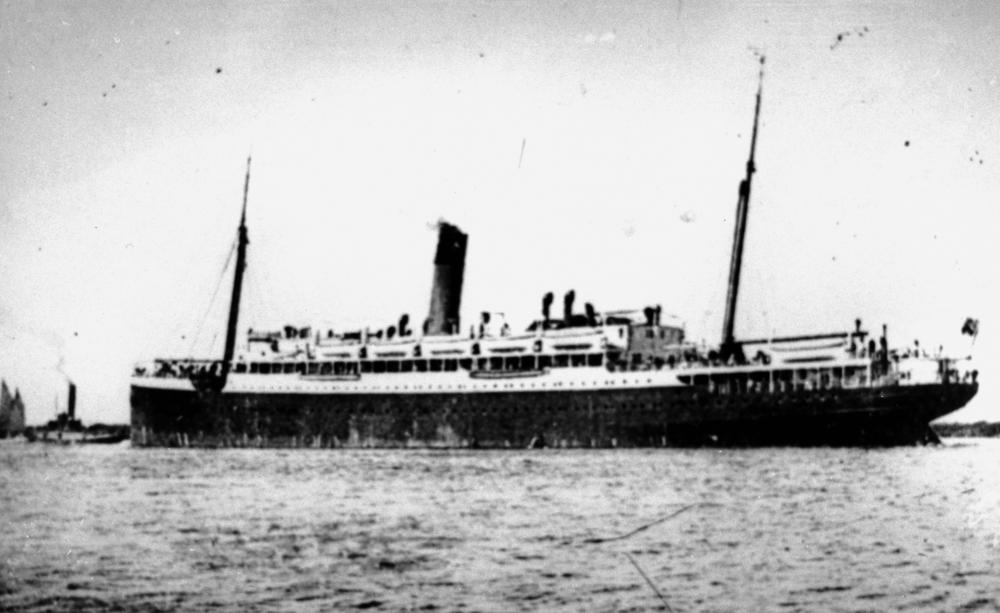
Karoola

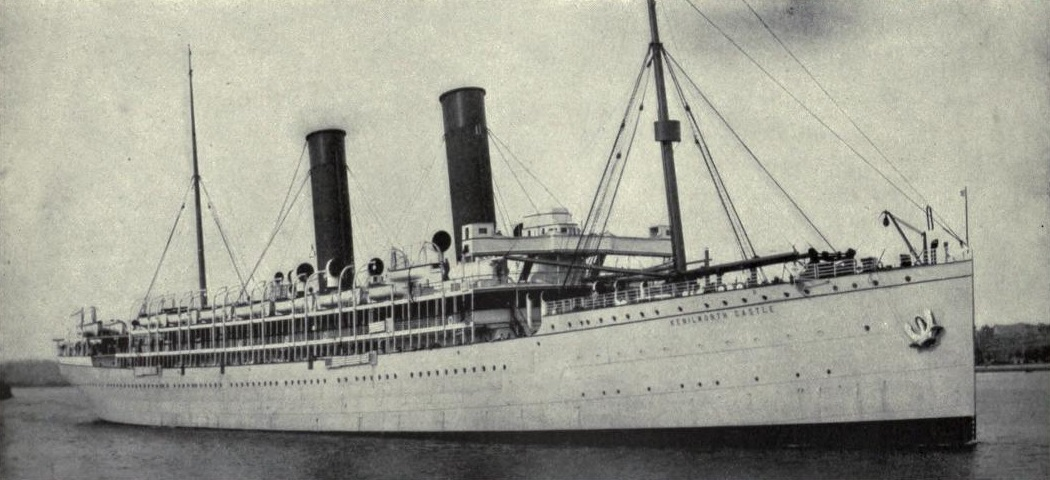
Kenilworth Castle

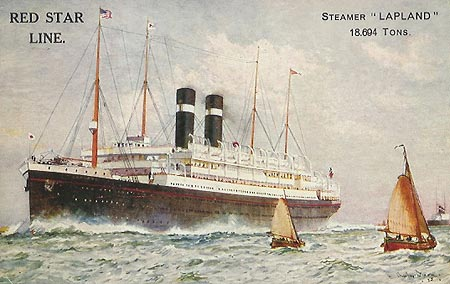
Lapland

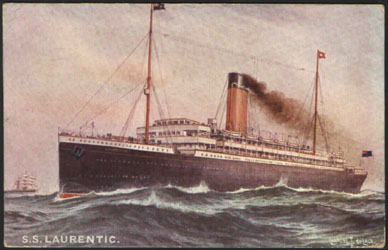
Laurentic

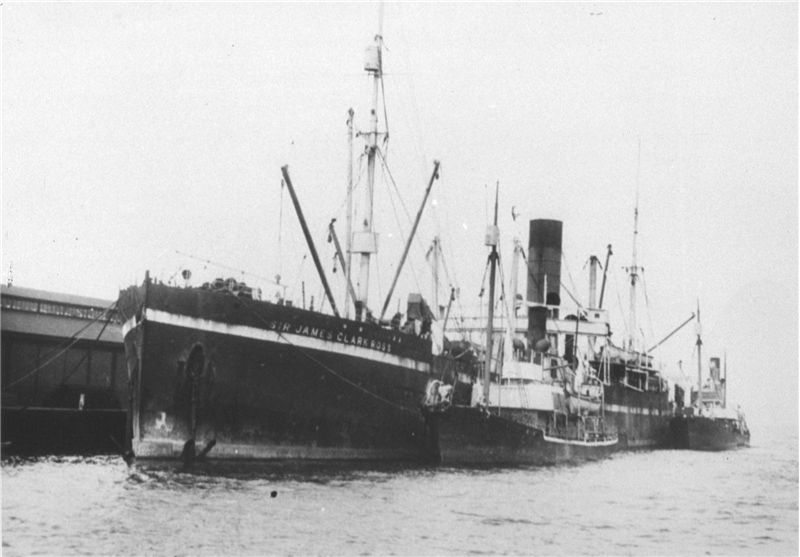
Sir James Clark Ross (launched as Maharonda)

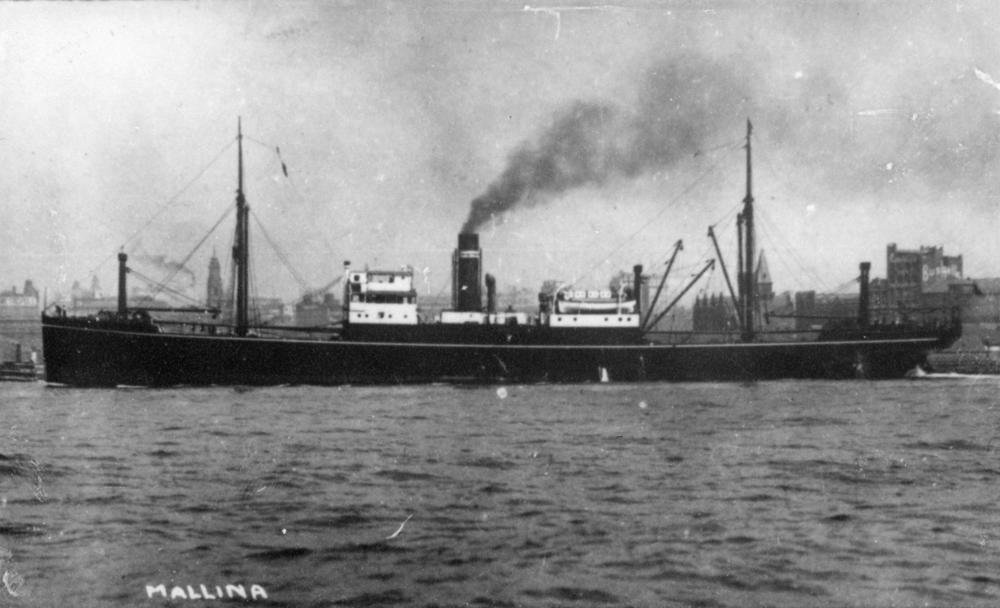
Mallina

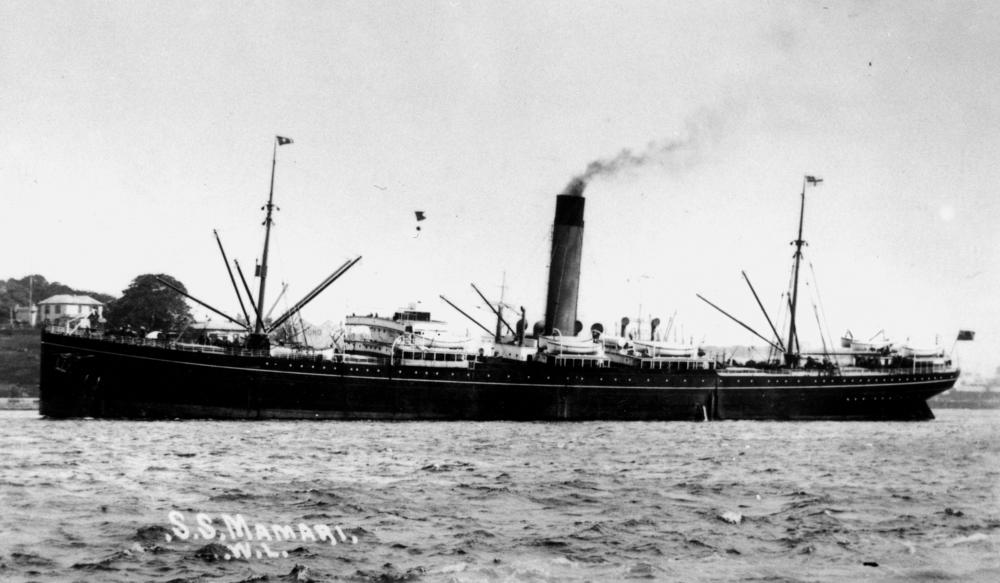
Mamari

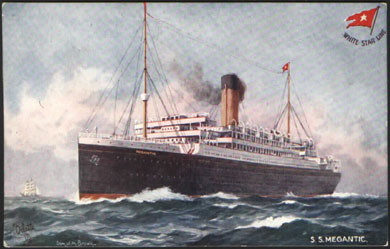
Megantic

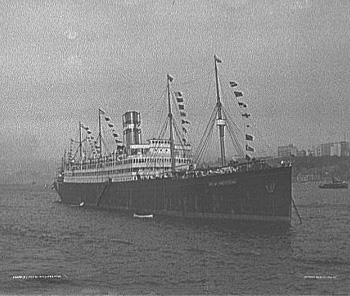
Nieuw Amsterdam

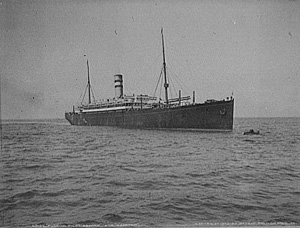
Noordam

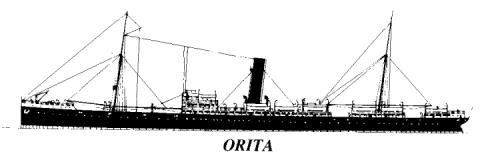
Orita

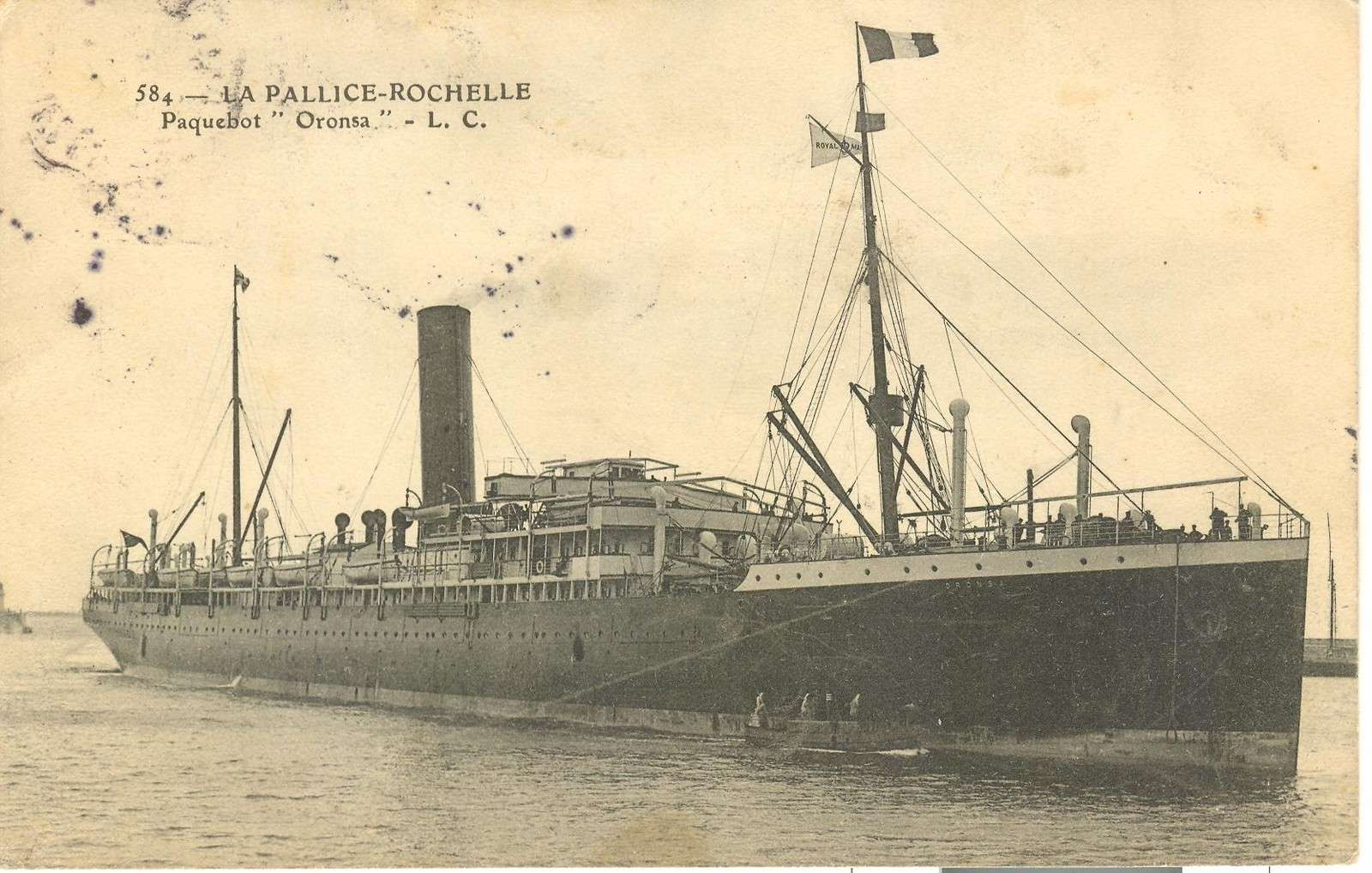
Oronsa

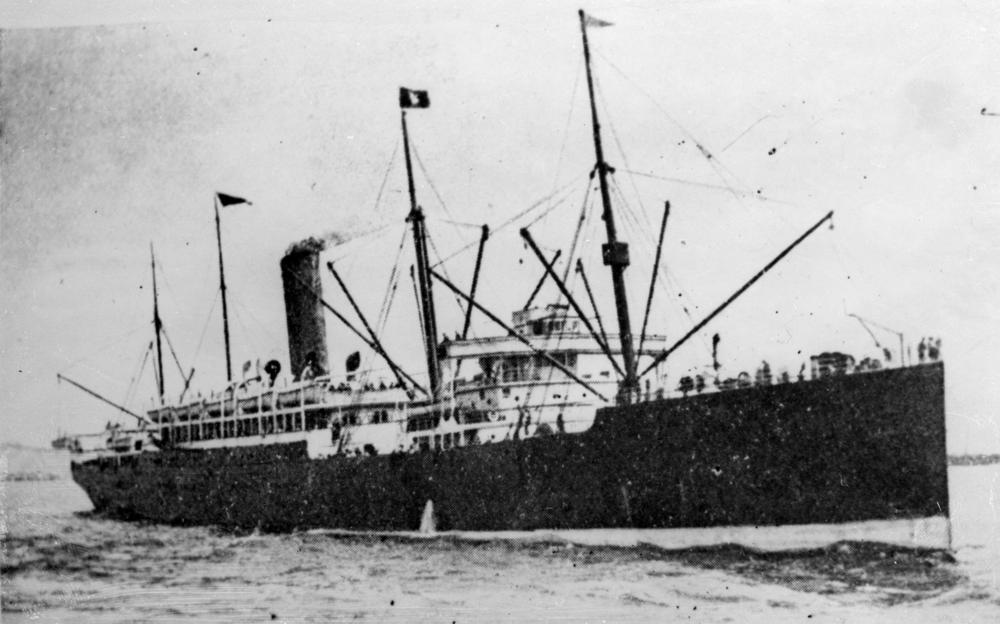
Pericles

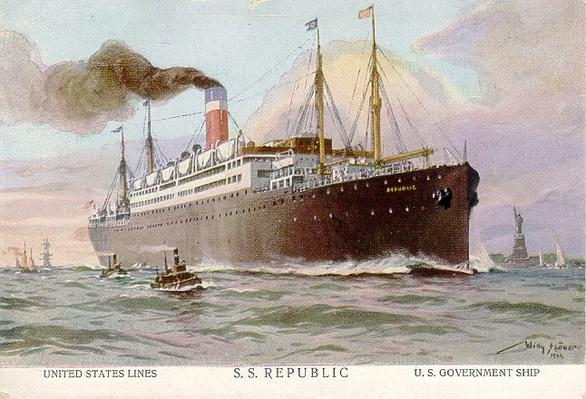
Republic

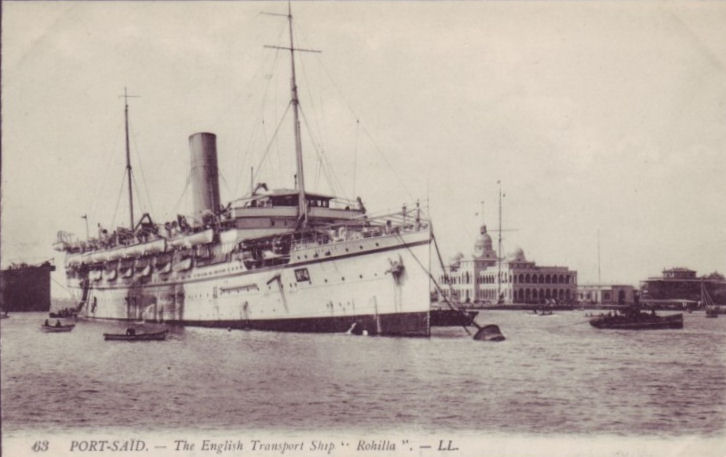
Rohilla

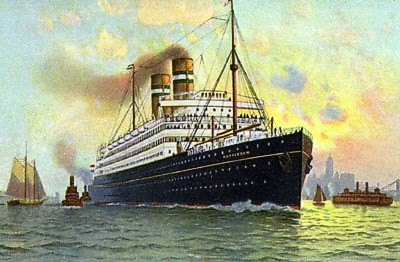
Rotterdam

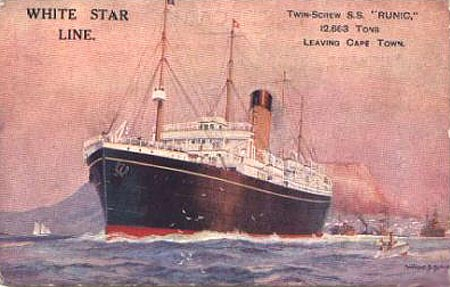
Runic

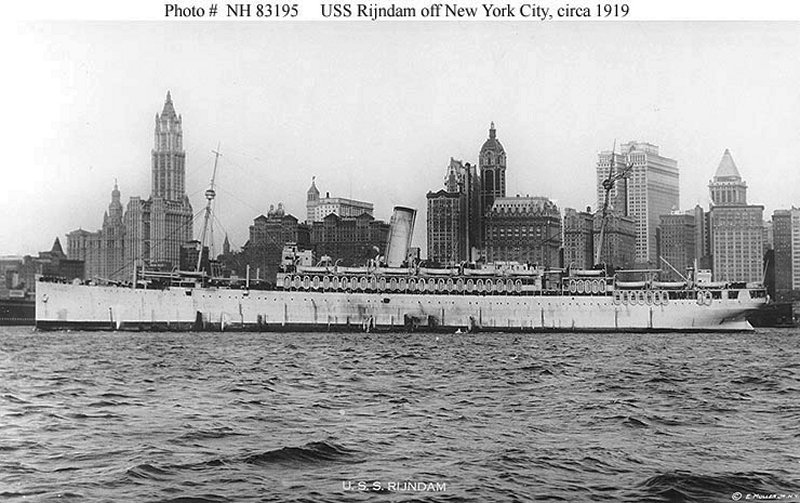
USS Rijndam (launched as Ryndam)

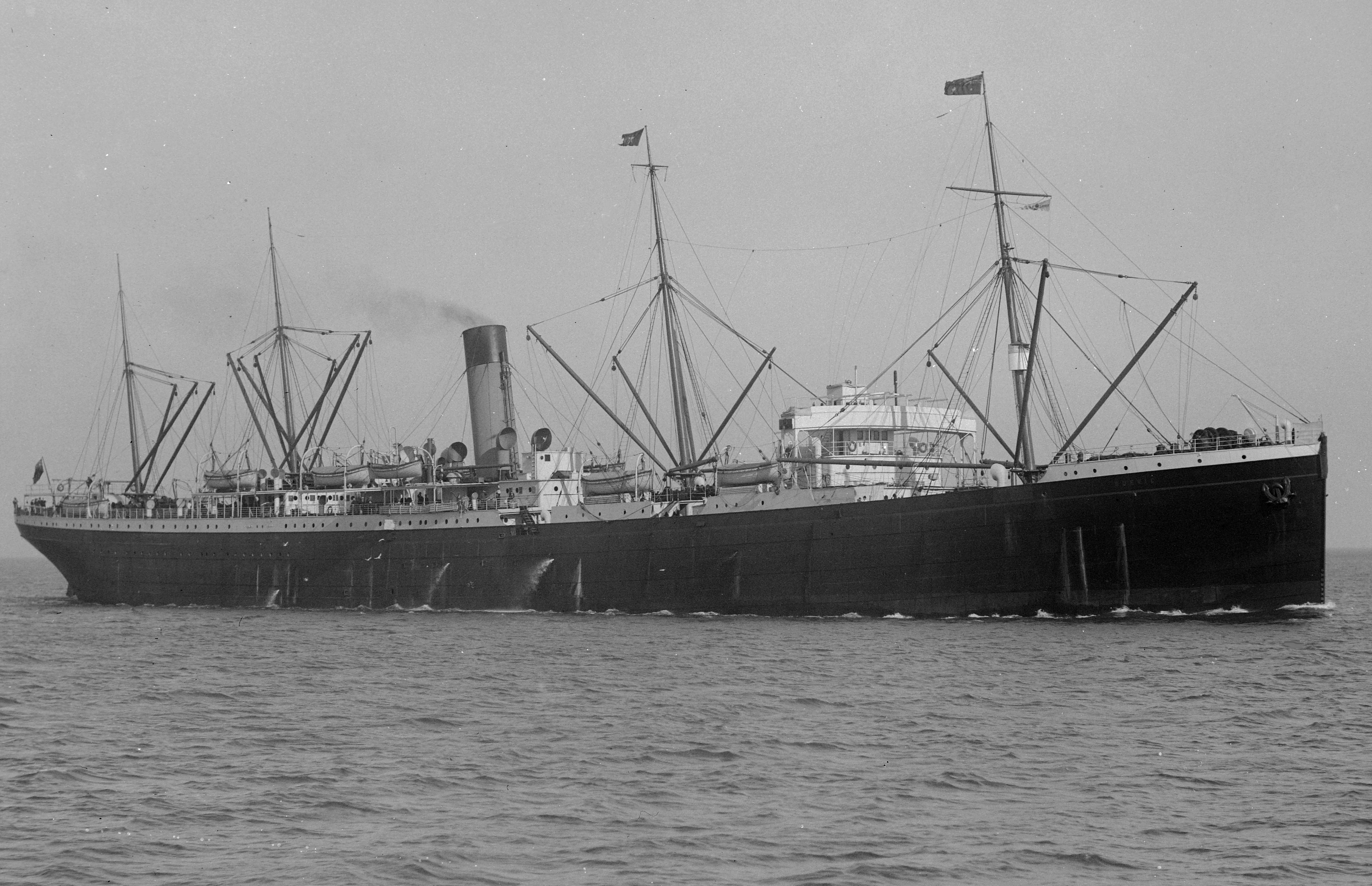
Suevic

== 1910s ==
- SS Edinburgh Castle, passenger ship for Union Castle, launched 27 January 1910, completed 28 April 1910, maiden voyage May 1910, sunk as a target 1945.
- SS Pakeha, cargo ship for Shaw Savill Line, launched 26 May 1910, completed 20 August 1910.
- SS Gloucestershire, passenger ship for Bibby Steamship Co, launched 7 July 1910, completed 22 October 1910, scrapped 1936.
- SS Preussen, passenger ship for the Hamburg America Line, launched 25 August 1910, completed 13 December 1910.
- SS Themistocles, passenger ship for Aberdeen Line, launched 22 September 1910, completed 12 January 1911, scrapped 1947.
- RMS Olympic, passenger ship for White Star Line, launched 20 October 1910, completed 31 May 1911, maiden voyage 14 June 1911, scrapped 1937.
- SS Sachsen, passenger ship for Hamburg America Line, launched 17 November 1910, completed 21 January 1911.
- SS Bayern, passenger ship for Hamburg America Line, launched 15 December 1910, completed 16 February 1911.
- SS Maloja, passenger ship for P&O, launched 17 December 1910, completed 7 September 1911, mined and sunk 27 February 1916.
- SS Demosthenes, passenger ship for Aberdeen Line, launched 28 February 1911, completed 5 August 1911, scrapped 1931.
- SS Galway Castle, passenger ship for Union Castle, launched 12 April 1911, completed 9 October 1911, torpedoed and sunk 1918.
- SS Nomadic, passenger tender for White Star Line, launched 25 April 1911, completed 27 May 1911, maiden voyage 31 May 1911, renamed Ingenieur Minard, preserved in Belfast.
- SS Traffic, passenger tender for White Star Line, launched 27 April 1911, completed 27 May 1911, maiden voyage 31 May 1911, renamed Ingenieur Riebell, sunk 1941.
- RMS Titanic, passenger ship for White Star Line, launched 31 May 1911, completed 2 April 1912, maiden voyage 10 April 1912, sunk 15 April 1912 2:20 am (ship's time) 5:20 (GMT)
- SS Zealandic, passenger ship for White Star Line, launched 29 June 1911, completed 12 October 1911, maiden voyage 30 October 1911, wrecked 1941.
- SS Patriotic, ferry for Belfast Steamship Co, launched 27 September 1911, completed 28 March 1912, renamed Lady Leinster, Lady Connaught 1938 and Lady Killarney 1947, scrapped 1956.
- SS Deseado, passenger ship for Royal Mail Line, launched 26 October 1911, completed 27 June 1912.
- RMS Arlanza, passenger ship for Royal Mail Line, launched 23 November 1911, completed 8 June 1912, scrapped 1938.
- SS Demerara, passenger ship for Royal Mail Line, launched 21 December 1911, completed 8 August 1912.
- SS Desna, passenger ship for Royal Mail Line, launched 2 March 1912, completed 3 October 1912.
- SS Darro, passenger ship for Royal Mail Line, launched 16 May 1912, completed 31 October 1912.
- SS Oxfordshire, cargo liner for Bibby Line, launched 15 June 1912, completed 17 September 1912, renamed Safina-E-Arab 1951, scrapped 1958.
- SS Drina, passenger ship for Royal Mail Line, launched 29 June 1912, completed 16 January 1913.
- SS Abosso, cargo ship for African Steamship Co, launched 15 August 1912, completed 19 December 1912, maiden voyage 8 January 1913, torpedoed and sunk 24 April 1917.
- SS Appam, passenger ship for British & African Steamship Co, launched 10 October 1912, completed 27 February 1913, maiden voyage 12 March 1913.
- SS Ceramic, passenger ship for White Star Line, launched 11 December 1912, completed 5 July 1913, maiden voyage 24 July 1913, torpedoed and sunk 6 December 1942.
- SS Katoomba, passenger ship for McIlwraith & McEachern & Co, launched 10 April 1913, completed 10 July 1913, renamed Columbia 1949, scrapped 1959.
- SS Andes, passenger ship for PSNC, launched 8 May 1913, completed 12 September 1913.
- SS Attendant, passenger tender for Elder Dempster, launched 10 July 1913, completed 21 August 1913.
- SS Maryland, passenger ship for Atlantic Transport Co, launched 4 September 1913, completed 1 November 1913.
- SS Orduna, passenger ship for PSNC, launched 2 October 1913, completed 22 January 1914, maiden voyage 19 February 1914, scrapped 1951.
- SS Alcantara, passenger ship for Royal Mail Line, launched 30 October 1913, completed 28 May 1914, maiden voyage June 1914, sunk by enemy action 29 February 1916.
- SS Missouri, passenger ship for Atlantic Transport Co, launched 27 November 1913, completed 28 February 1914
- SS Egba, cargo ship for Elder Dempster, launched 17 December 1913, completed 5 April 1914.
- SS Euripides, passenger ship for Aberdeen Line, launched 29 January 1914, completed 6 June 1914, maiden voyage 1 July 1914, renamed Akaroa 1932, scrapped 1954.
- SS Mississippi, passenger ship for Atlantic Transport Co, launched 11 February 1914, completed 5 November 1914.
- RMS Britannic, passenger ship for White Star Line, launched 26 February 1914, completed 8 December 1915, sunk by mine 21 November 1916
- SS Falstria, cargo ship for East Asiatic Co, launched 12 March 1914, completed 31 March 1915.
- SS Egori, cargo ship for Elder Dempster, launched 22 April 1914, completed 21 June 1914.
- SS Orbita, passenger ship for PSNC, launched 7 July 1914, completed 31 July 1915, maiden voyage 26 September 1919, scrapped 1950.
- SS Statendam, passenger ship launched 9 July 1914 for Holland America Line, completed 7 April 1917 as Justicia for White Star Line, torpedoed and sunk 19 July 1918.
- Kangaroo, cargo ship launched 9 July 1914, completed 22 October 1915 for Stateships, Western Australia, sunk 3 February 1952.
- SS Apapa, (Clyde-built), passenger ship for Elder Dempster Line, launched 30 September 1914, completed 4 March 1915.
- SS Almanzora, passenger ship for Royal Mail Line, launched on 19 November 1914, completed 7 October 1915.
- SS Belgenland, passenger ship for International Navigation Co, launched 31 December 1914, completed 21 June 1917 as Belgic, renamed Belgenland 1923 and Columbia 1935, scrapped 1936
- HMS Earl of Peterborough, monitor for British Admiralty, launched 16 January 1915, completed 23 September 1915, scrapped 1921.
- SS Glengyle, cargo ship for Glen Line, launched 19 January 1915, completed 7 December 1915.
- MV Glenartney, cargo ship for Glen Line, launched 14 April 1915, completed 16 May 1916.
- HMS Abercrombie, monitor for British Admiralty, launched 15 April 1915, completed 29 May 1915, scrapped 1927.
- SS Marconi, cargo ship for Lamport and Holt, launched 19 April 1916, completed 1 February 1917.
- HMS Havelock, monitor for British Admiralty, launched 29 April 1915, completed 29 May 1915, scrapped 1927.
- HMS Raglan, (Govan-built), monitor for British Admiralty, launched 29 April 1915, completed 24 June 1915, sunk 20 January 1918.
- HMS M29, monitor for British Admiralty, launched 22 May 1915, completed 20 June 1915, renamed Medusa 1925, Talbot 1941 and Medway II 1944, scrapped 1946.
- HMS M32, (sub-contracted to Workman Clark), monitor for British Admiralty, launched 22 May 1915, completed 20 June 1915, renamed SS Ampat 1920
- HMS M33, (sub-contracted to Workman Clark), monitor for British Admiralty, launched 22 May 1915, completed 26 June 1915, renamed Minerva 1925 and Hulk C23, preserved asM33.
- HMS Lord Clive, monitor for British Admiralty, launched 10 June 1915, completed 10 July 1915, scrapped 1927.
- HMS M30, monitor for British Admiralty, launched 23 June 1915, completed 9 July 1915, sunk by enemy action 14 May 1916.
- HMS M31, monitor for British Admiralty, launched 24 June 1915, completed 9 July 1915, renamed Melpomene 1925 and Menelaus 1941, scrapped 1948.
- HMS General Craufurd, monitor for British Admiralty, launched 8 July 1915, completed 26 August 1915, scrapped 1921.
- HMS Prince Eugene, (Govan-built), monitor for British Admiralty, launched 14 July 1915, completed 2 September 1915, scrapped 1921.
- HMS Sir Thomas Picton, monitor for British Admiralty, launched 30 September 1915, completed 4 November 1915, scrapped 1921.
- HMS P24, (Govan-built), patrol boat for British Admiralty, launched 24 November 1915, completed 21 January 1916, scrapped 1921.
- HMS P25, (Govan-built), patrol boat for British Admiralty, launched 15 January 1916, completed 17 March 1916, scrapped 1921.
- HMS Glorious, battlecruiser for British Admiralty, launched 20 April 1916, completed 31 December 1916, converted to aircraft carrier 1930, sunk by enemy action 8 June 1940.
- MV Glenamoy, cargo ship for Glen Line, launched 2 May 1916, completed 22 September 1916.
- HMS Terror, (Govan-built), monitor for British Admiralty, launched 18 May 1916, completed 6 August 1916, sunk by enemy action 23 February 1941.
- HMS Erebus, (Govan-built), monitor for British Admiralty, launched 19 June 1916, completed 2 September 1916, scrapped July 1946.
- SS Brecknockshire, cargo ship for Royal Mail Line, launched 12 September 1916, completed 11 January 1917.
- HMS Salmon, destroyer for British Admiralty, launched 7 October 1916, completed 20 December 1916, renamed Sable 1933, scrapped 1937.
- SS Millais, cargo ship for Lamport & Holt, launched 8 November 1916, completed 18 September 1917.
- HMS Sylph, (Govan-built), destroyer for British Admiralty, launched 15 November 1916, completed 10 February 1917, scrapped 1927.
- SS Lancashire, passenger ship for Bibby Steamship Co, launched 11 January 1917, completed 9 August 1917, scrapped April 1956.
- HMS Skilful, (Govan-built), destroyer for British Admiralty, launched 3 February 1917, completed 26 March 1917, scrapped 1926.
- SS Minnekahda, passenger ship for Atlantic Transport Co, launched 8 March 1917, completed 21 March 1918, scrapped 1936.
- HMS Springbok, (Govan-built), destroyer for British Admiralty, launched 9 March 1917, completed 30 April 1917, scrapped 1926.
- SS Orca, passenger ship for PSNC, launched 5 April 1917, completed 25 May 1918.
- RMS Regina, (Govan-built), passenger ship for Dominion Line, launched 19 April 1917, completed 11 January 1918, entered passenger service 1919, renamed Westernland, scrapped 1947.
- HMS Tetrarch, (Govan-built), destroyer for British Admiralty, launched 20 April 1917, completed 2 June 1917, scrapped 1934.
- SS Melita, passenger ship for Canadian Pacific Railway, launched 21 April 1917, completed 12 January 1918, renamed Liguria, scuttled January 1941, raised 1950 and scrapped.
- SS Glenavy, cargo ship for Glen Line, launched 17 May 1917, completed 1 September 1917.
- HMS Tenacious, (Govan-built), destroyer for British Admiralty, launched 21 May 1917, completed 11 August 1917, scrapped 1928.
- HMS P62, (Govan-built), patrol boat for British Admiralty, renamed PC62, launched 7 June 1917, completed 31 August 1917, scrapped 1921.
- SS War Shamrock, A-type cargo ship for Shipping Controller, launched 21 June 1917, completed 20 August 1917.
- SS War Clover, A-type cargo ship for Shipping Controller, launched 16 August 1917, completed 20 September 1917.
- SS Rimouski, cargo ship for Dominion Line, launched 30 August 1917, completed 11 July 1918.
- SS War Trefoil, A-type cargo ship for Shipping Controller, launched 15 September 1917, completed 16 October 1917.
- SS War Hostage, AO tanker for Shipping Controller, launched 16 October 1917, completed 22 December 1917.
- SS War Cobra, B-type cargo ship for Shipping Controller, launched 15 November 1917, completed 20 December 1917.
- SS Minnedosa, (Clyde-built), passenger ship for Canadian Pacific Railway, launched 17 October 1917, completed 21 November 1918, renamed Piemonte, scuttled August 1943, raised 1949 and scrapped.
- SS Vedic, passenger ship for White Star Line, launched 18 December 1917, completed 10 July 1918.
- War Expert, AO tanker for Shipping Controller, launched 29 December 1917, completed 18 March 1918.
- SS War Python, B-type cargo ship for Shipping Controller, launched 29 December 1917, completed 24 January 1918.
- HMS Cavendish, seaplane carrier for British Admiralty, launched 17 January 1918, renamed Vindictive in June completed 19 October 1918, scrapped 1946.
- SS Coney (Govan built), coaster for G&J Burns Ltd, launched 14 February 1918, completed 27 April 1918.
- SS War Viper, B-type cargo ship for Shipping Controller, launched 14 February 1918, completed 14 March 1918.
- SS War Bittern, B-type cargo ship for Shipping Controller, launched 14 March 1918, completed 11 April 1918.
- SS War African, AO tanker for Shipping Controller, launched 28 March 1918, completed 15 May 1918.
- SS War Buckler, D-type cargo ship for Shipping Controller, launched 28 March 1918, completed 30 May 1918.
- SS War Tabard, D-type cargo ship for Shipping Controller, launched 28 March 1918, completed 15 June 1918.
- SS Narkunda, passenger ship for P&O, launched 25 April 1918, completed 30 March 1920.
- SS War Lemur, B-type cargo ship for Shipping Controller, launched 9 May 1918, completed 28 May 1918.
- SS War Legate, AO tanker for Shipping Controller, launched 25 May 1918, completed 28 June 1918.
- HMS St Aubin, tug for British Admiralty, launched 27 June 1918, completed 21 August 1918.
- SS War Envoy, AO tanker for Shipping Controller, launched 27 July 1918, completed 5 September 1918.
- SS War Snake, B-type cargo ship for Shipping Controller, launched 22 August 1918, completed 29 August 1918.
- HMS St Bees, tug for British Admiralty, launched 5 September 1918, completed 24 October 1918.
- SS War Icarus, G-type cargo ship for Shipping Controller, launched 19 September 1918, completed 31 October 1918.
- SS War Aryan, AO tanker for Shipping Controller, launched 24 September 1918, completed 7 November 1918.
- SS War Melody, N-type cargo ship for Shipping Controller, launched 19 October 1918, completed 7 November 1918.
- SS War Music, N-type cargo ship for Shipping Controller, launched 2 November 1918, completed 5 December 1918.
- SS War Cowslip, A-type cargo ship for Shipping Controller, launched 22 November 1918, completed 13 December 1918.
- HMS St Mellons, tug for British Admiralty, launched 30 November 1918, completed 30 December 1918.
- SS War Dream, N-type cargo ship for Shipping Controller, launched 5 December 1918, completed 9 January 1919.
- SS War Jasmine, A-type cargo ship for Shipping Controller, launched 17 December 1918, completed 31 December 1918.
- SS War Priam, G-type cargo ship for Shipping Controller, launched 19 December 1918, completed 13 March 1919.
- HMS St Olaves, tug for British Admiralty, launched 27 December 1918, completed 4 March 1919.
- SS War Paris, G-type cargo ship for Shipping Controller, launched 5 March 1919, completed 17 April 1919.
- MV Glenade, cargo ship for Glen Line, launched 15 April 1919, completed 16 July 1919.
- SS Yorkshire, passenger ship for Bibby Steamship Co, launched 29 May 1919, completed 2 September 1920, maiden voyage September 1920, torpedoed and sunk on 17 October 1939.
- MV Glenariffe, cargo ship for Glen Line, launched 10 July 1919, completed 23 October 1919.
- SS War Poplar, B-type cargo ship for Shipping Controller, launched 28 August 1919, completed 25 November 1919 as Dromore Castle.
- RMS Arundel Castle, passenger ship for Union Castle, launched 11 September 1919, completed 8 April 1921, maiden voyage 22 April 1921, scrapped 1959.
- MV Glenluce, cargo ship for Glen Line, launched 25 September 1919, completed 14 January 1920.
- SS War Airman, AO tanker for Shipping Controller, launched 22 November 1919, completed 29 January 1920.
- SS War Vision, N-type cargo ship for Shipping Controller, launched 3 April 1919, completed 8 May 1919.
- SS War Dahlia, B-type cargo ship for African Steamship Co, launched 29 April 1919, completed as Biafra 19 June 1919.
- SS War Pampas, A-type cargo ship for Shipping controller, launched 29 April 1919, completed as Trelissick 13 June 1919.
- SS War Justice, N-type cargo ship for Shipping Controller, launched 30 April 1919, completed 27 May 1919.
- SS War Liberty, N-type cargo ship for Shipping Controller, launched 15 May 1919, completed 26 June 1919.
- SS War Jonquil, A-type cargo ship for Shipping Controller, launched 11 June 1919, completed as Treveal 9 September 1919.
- SS War Triumph, A-type cargo ship for Shipping Controller, launched 12 June 1919, completed as New Georgia 7 October 1920.
- SS New Mexico, N-type cargo ship for Elder Dempster, launched 26 June 1919, completed 28 August 1919.
- SS Siris, B-type cargo ship for Royal Mail Line, launched 26 June 1919, completed 25 September 1919.
- New Texas, N-Type cargo ship for Elder Dempster, launched 14 August 1919, completed 18 September 1919.
- SS New Toronto, N-type cargo ship for Elder Dempster, launched 28 August 1919, completed 9 October 1919.
- SS War Passion, N-type cargo ship for Elder Dempster, launched 11 October 1919, completed 23 March 1920.
- SS Boma, B-type cargo ship for Elder Dempster, launched 23 October 1919, completed 26 February 1920.
- SS Dundrum Castle, B-type cargo ship for Union Castle, launched 23 October 1919, completed 31 December 1919, sunk 1943.
- SS New Brighton, N-type cargo ship for African Steamship Co, launched 6 November 1919, completed 31 January 1920.
- SS War Riddle, N-type cargo ship for Atlantic Transport Co, launched 27 November 1919, completed 4 March 1920.
- SS War Romance, N-type cargo ship for Elder Dempster, launched 11 December 1919, completed as New Brooklyn 31 March 1920.
- MV Glentara, cargo ship for Glen Line, launched 25 December 1919, completed as Maine 13 April 1920.
- SS Somerset Coast, coaster for Coast Lines, launched 27 December 1919, completed 25 March 1920.
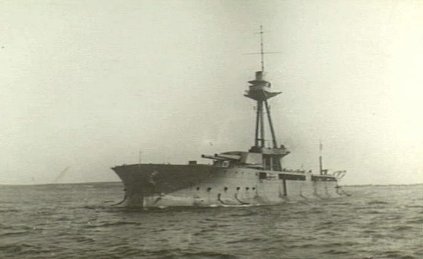
HMS Abercrombie

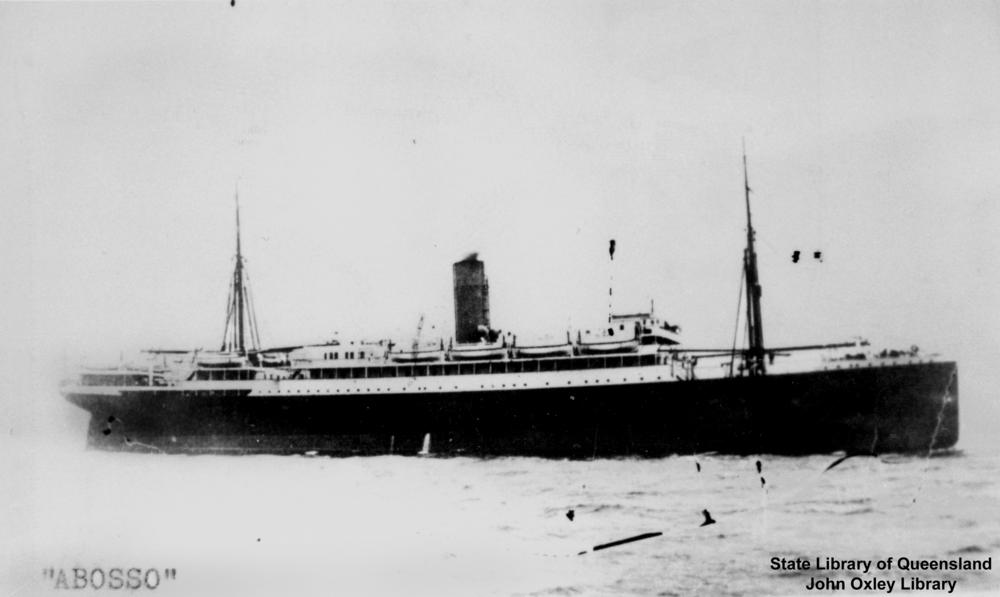
Abosso

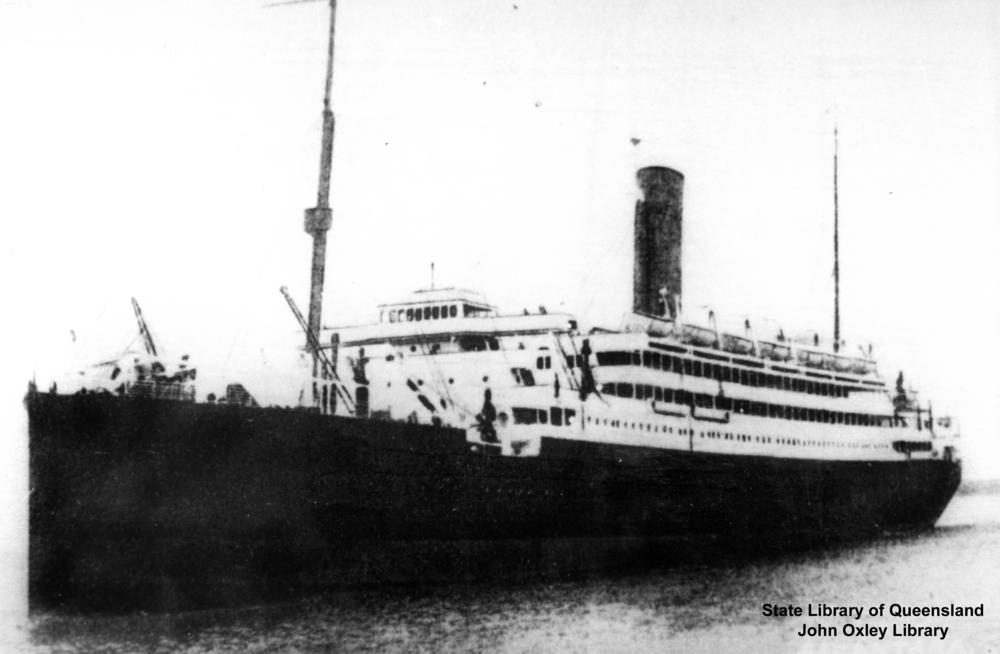
Alcantara

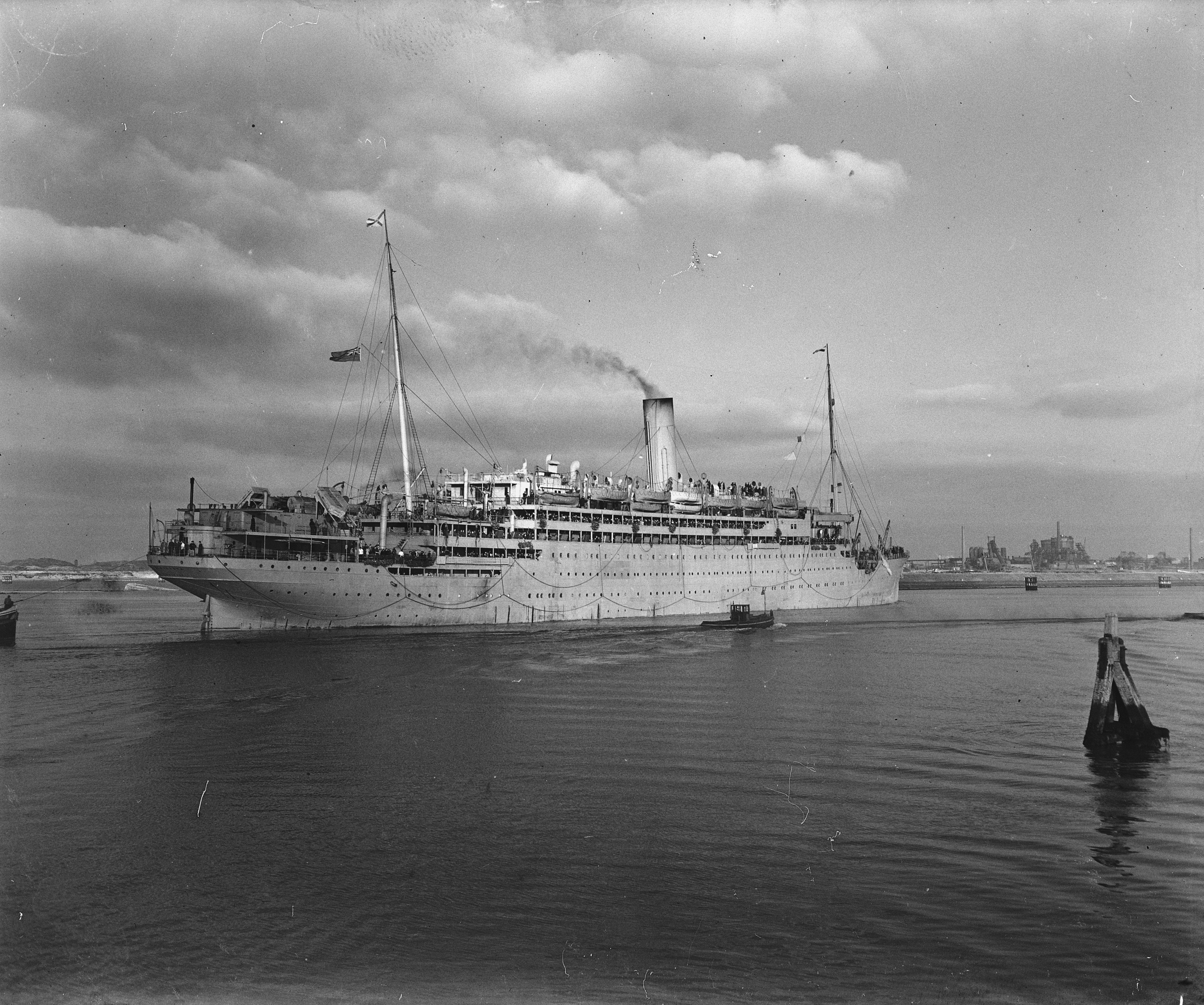
Almanzora

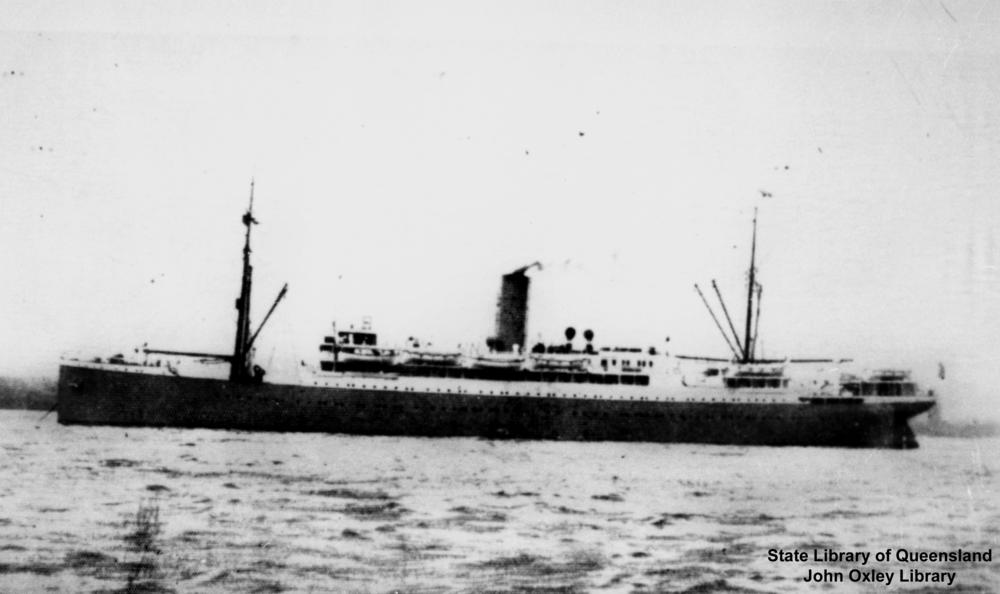
Appam

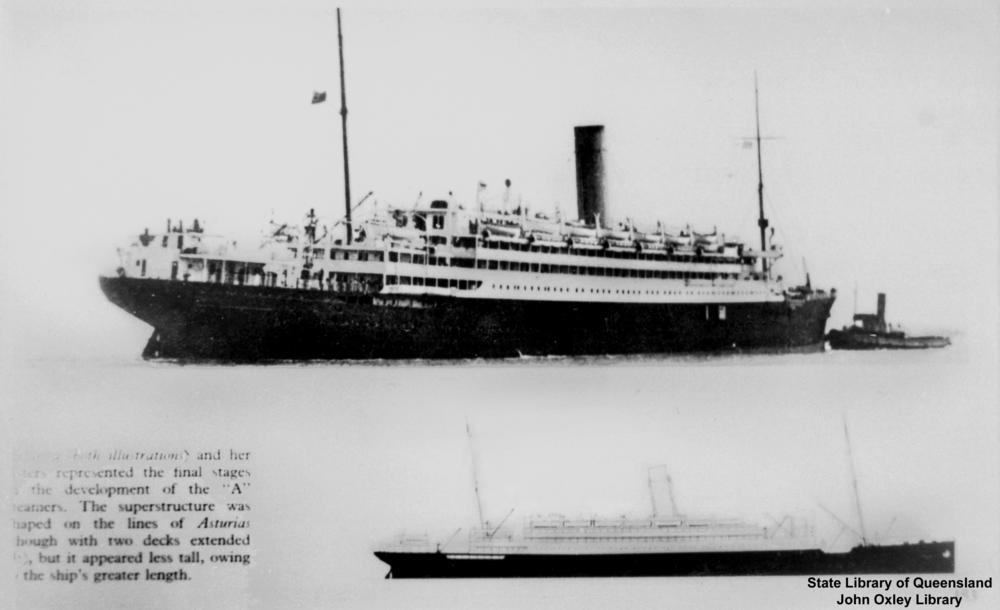
Arlanza

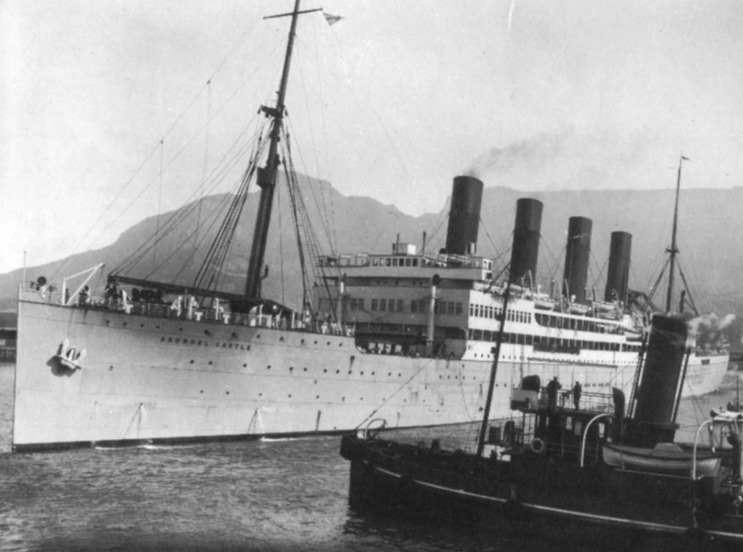
Arundel Castle

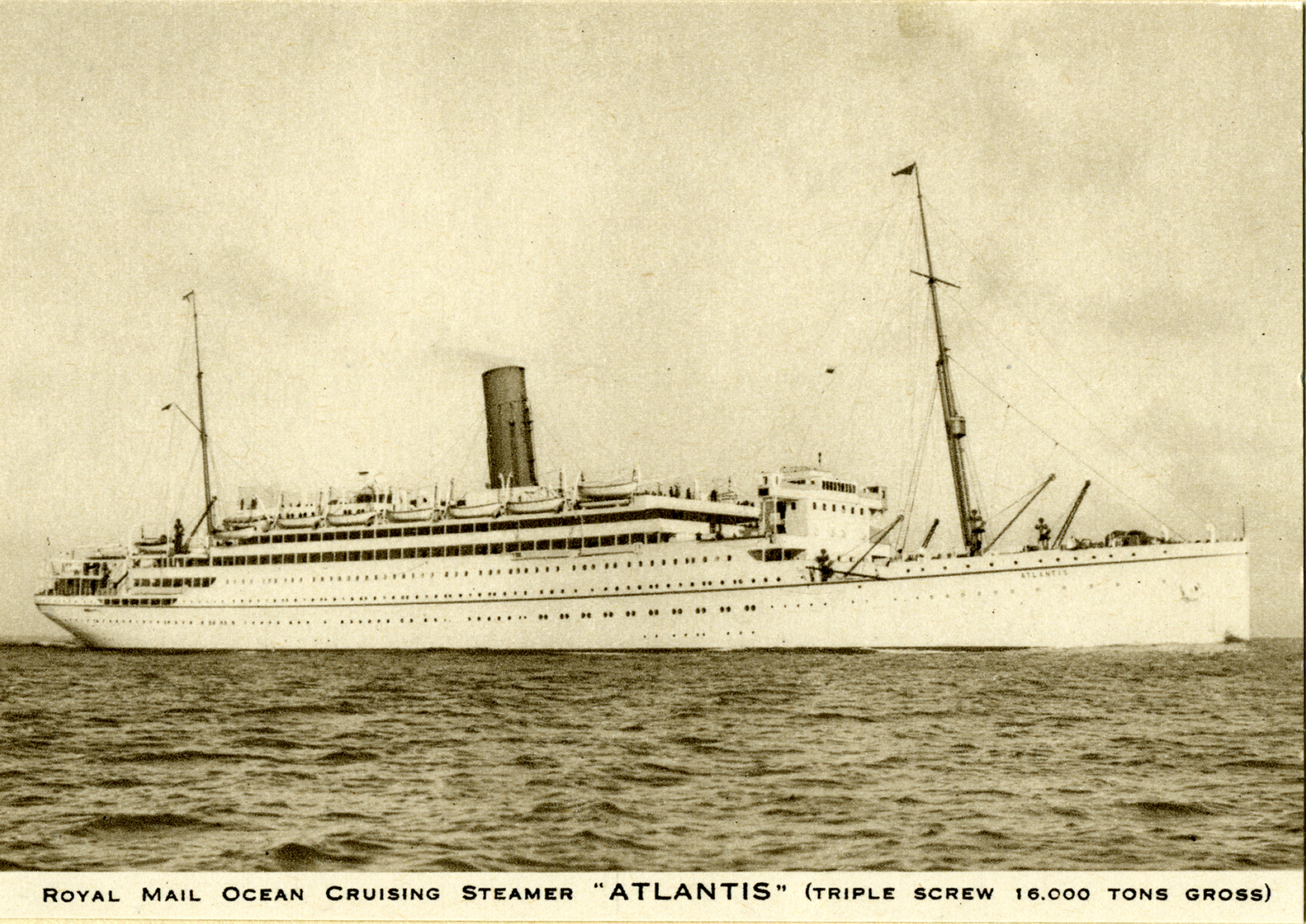
Atlantis

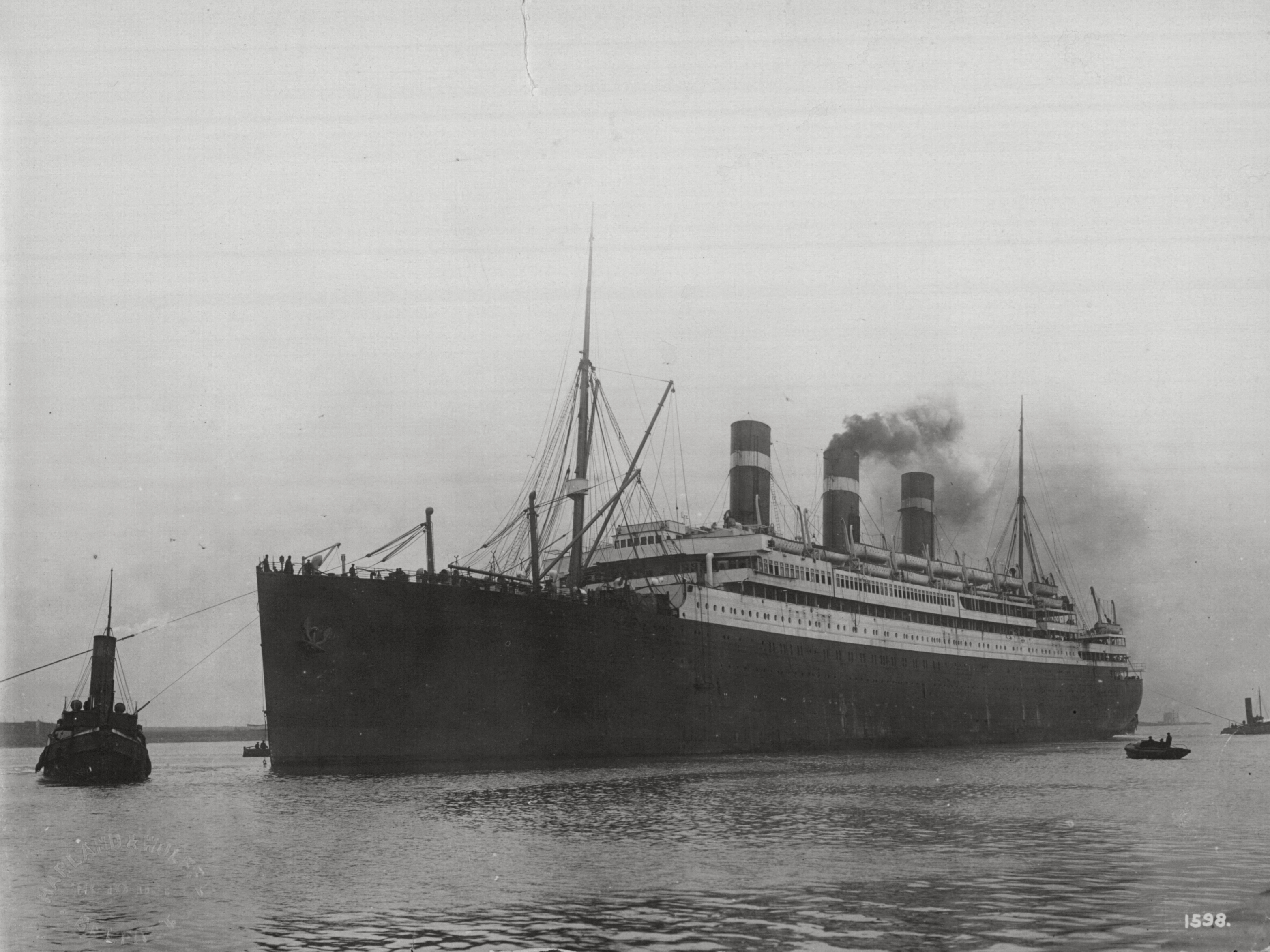
Belgenland

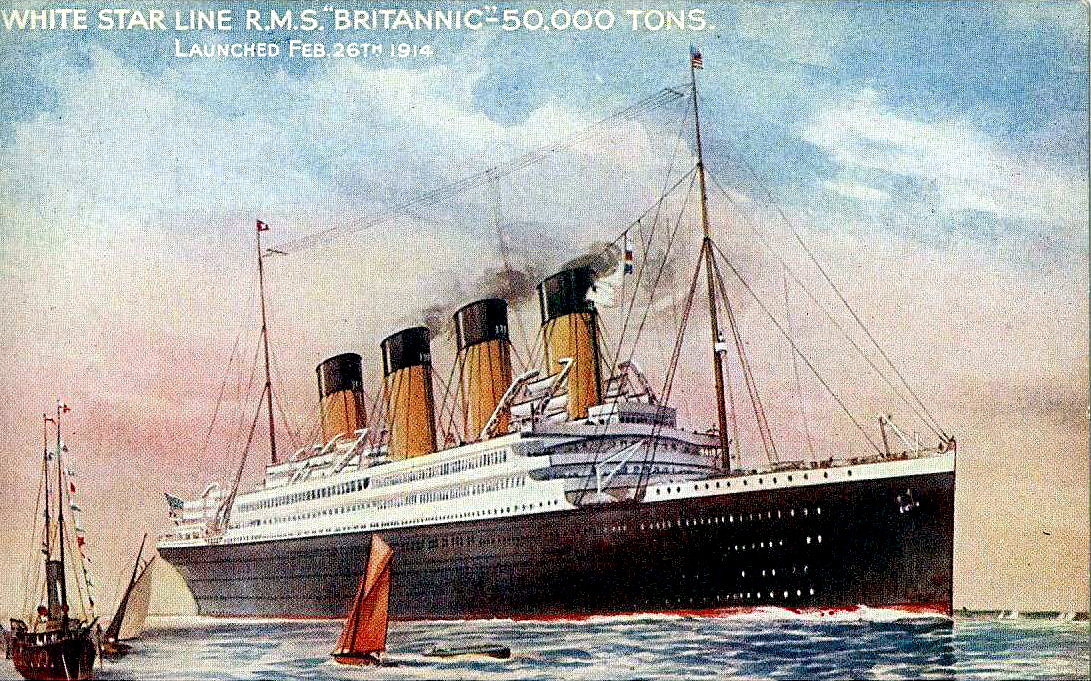
Britannic

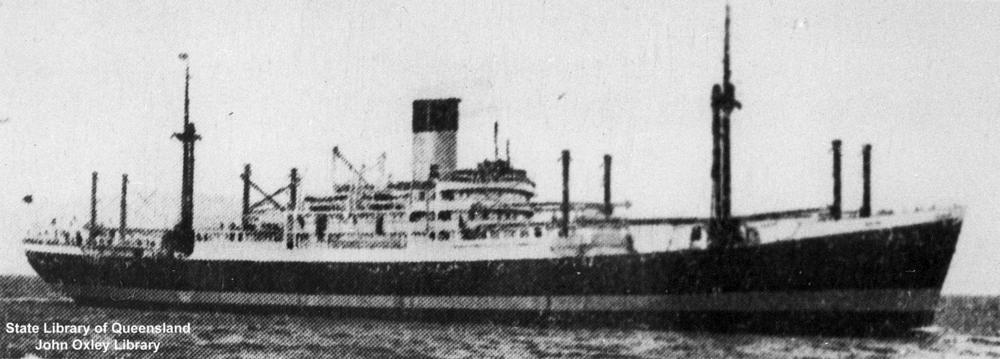
Calgaric

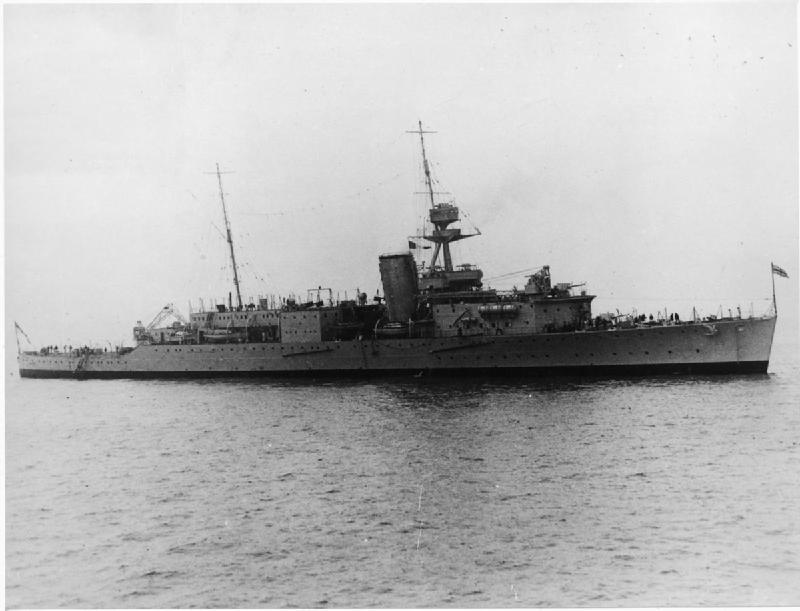
HMS Vindictive (launched as HMS Cavendish)

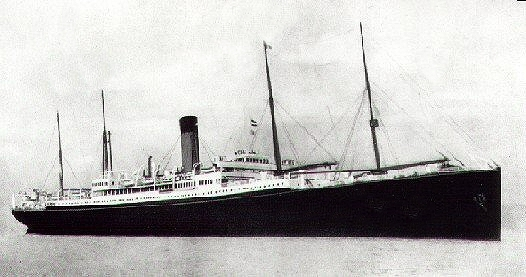
Ceramic

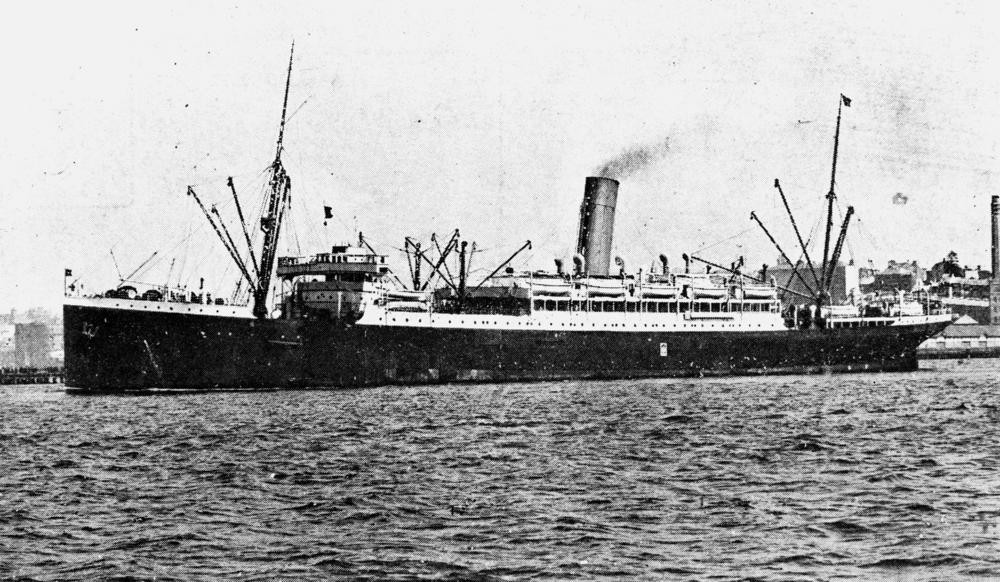
Demosthenes

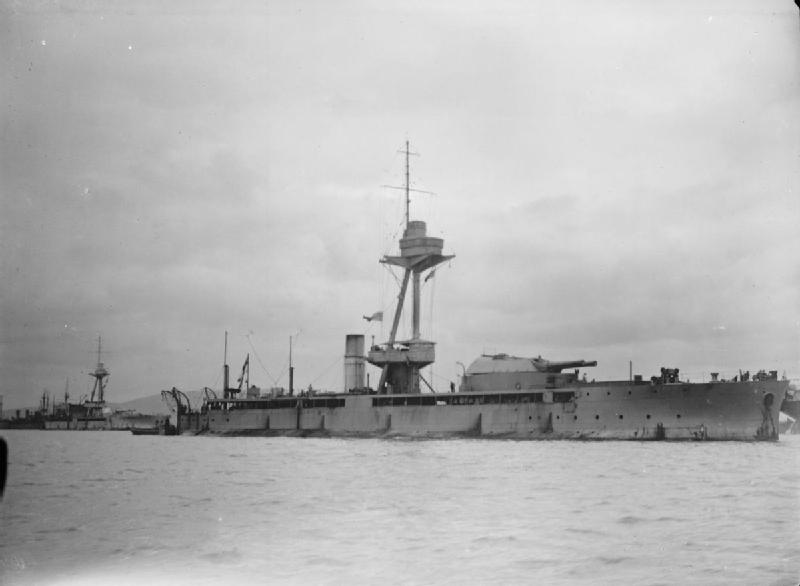
HMS Earl of Peterborough

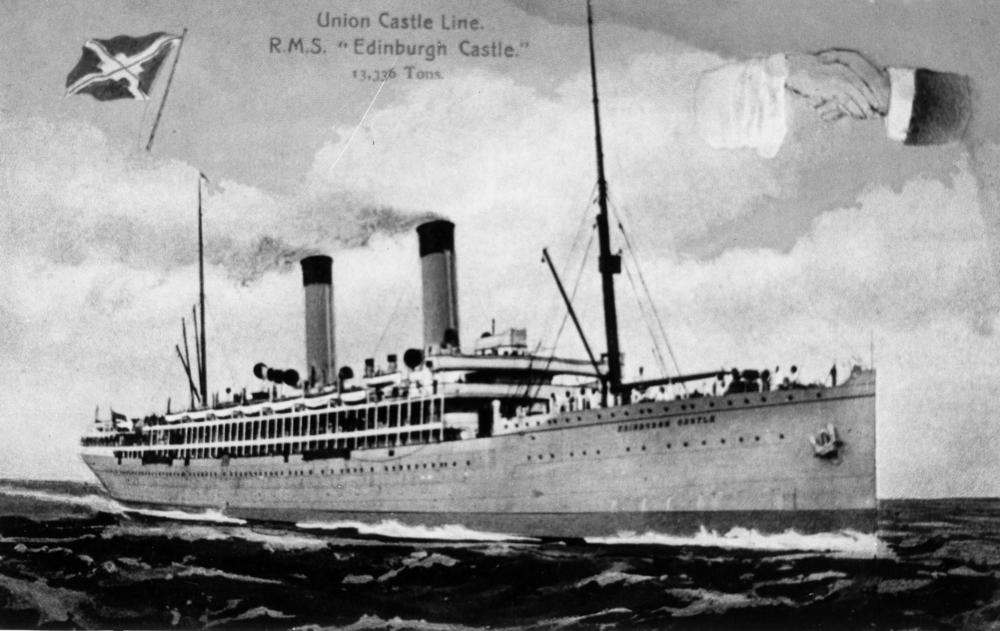
Edinburgh Castle

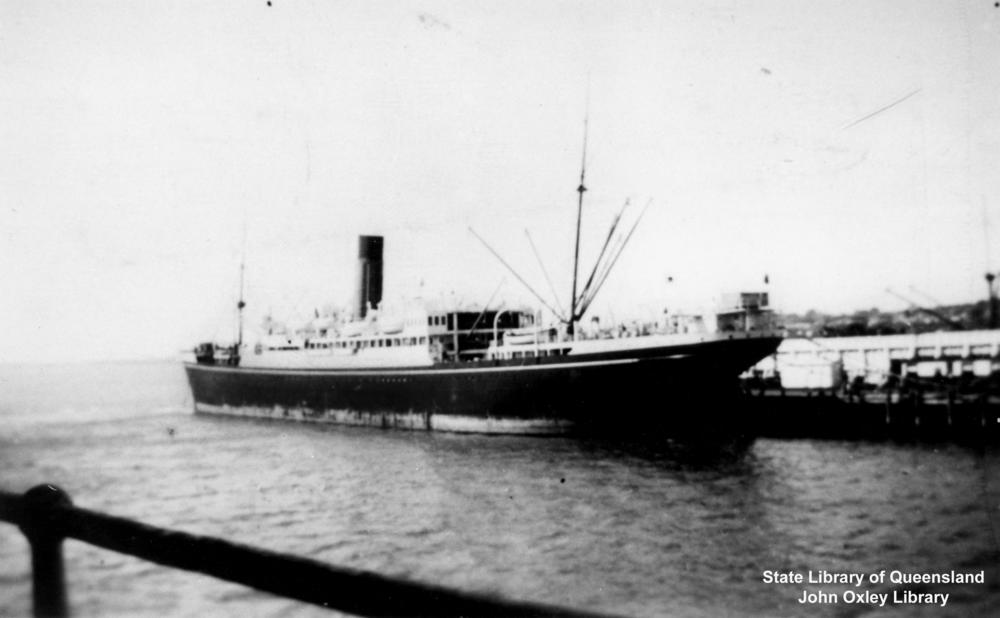
Akaroa (launched as Euripides)

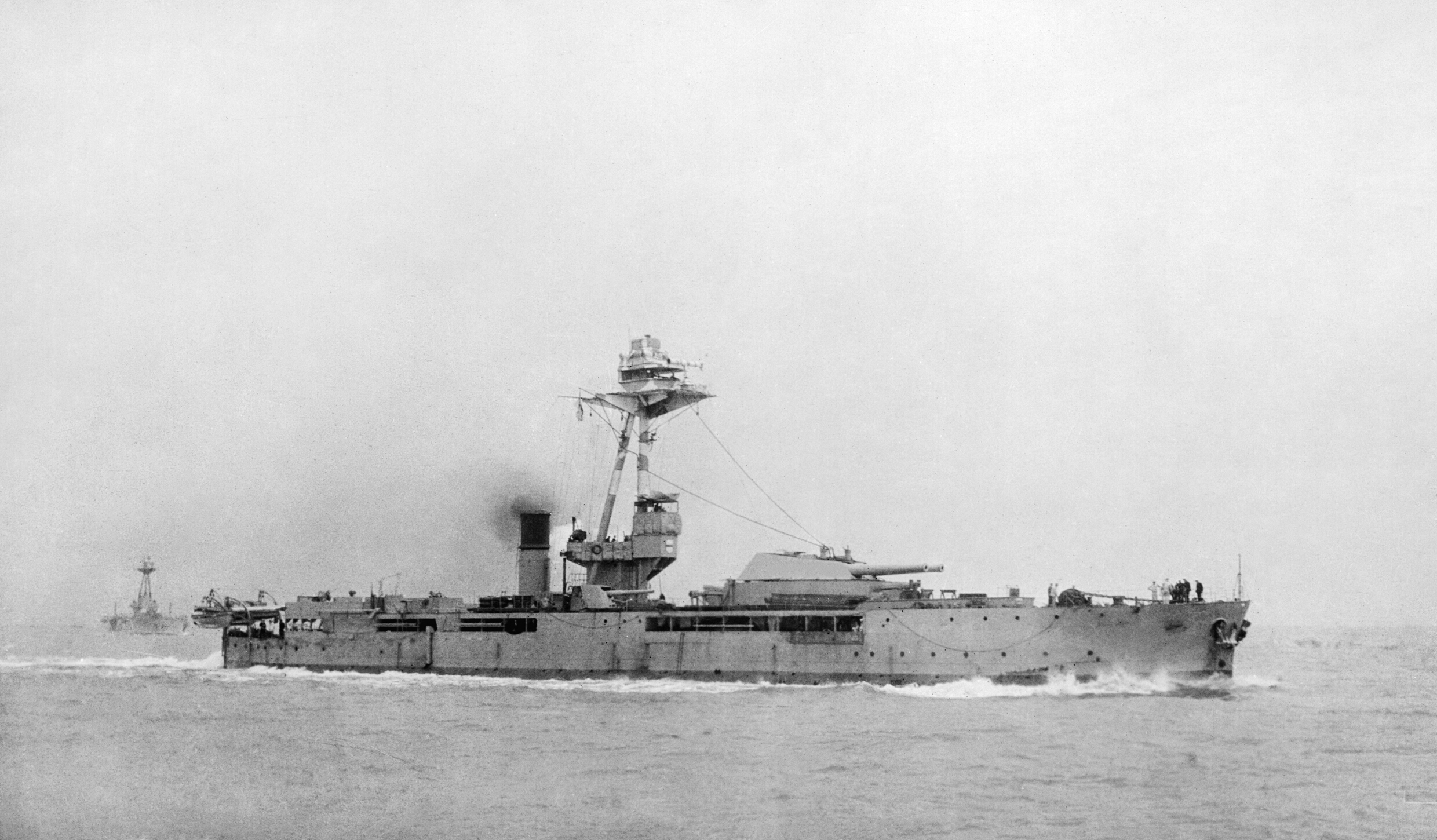
HMS General Craufurd

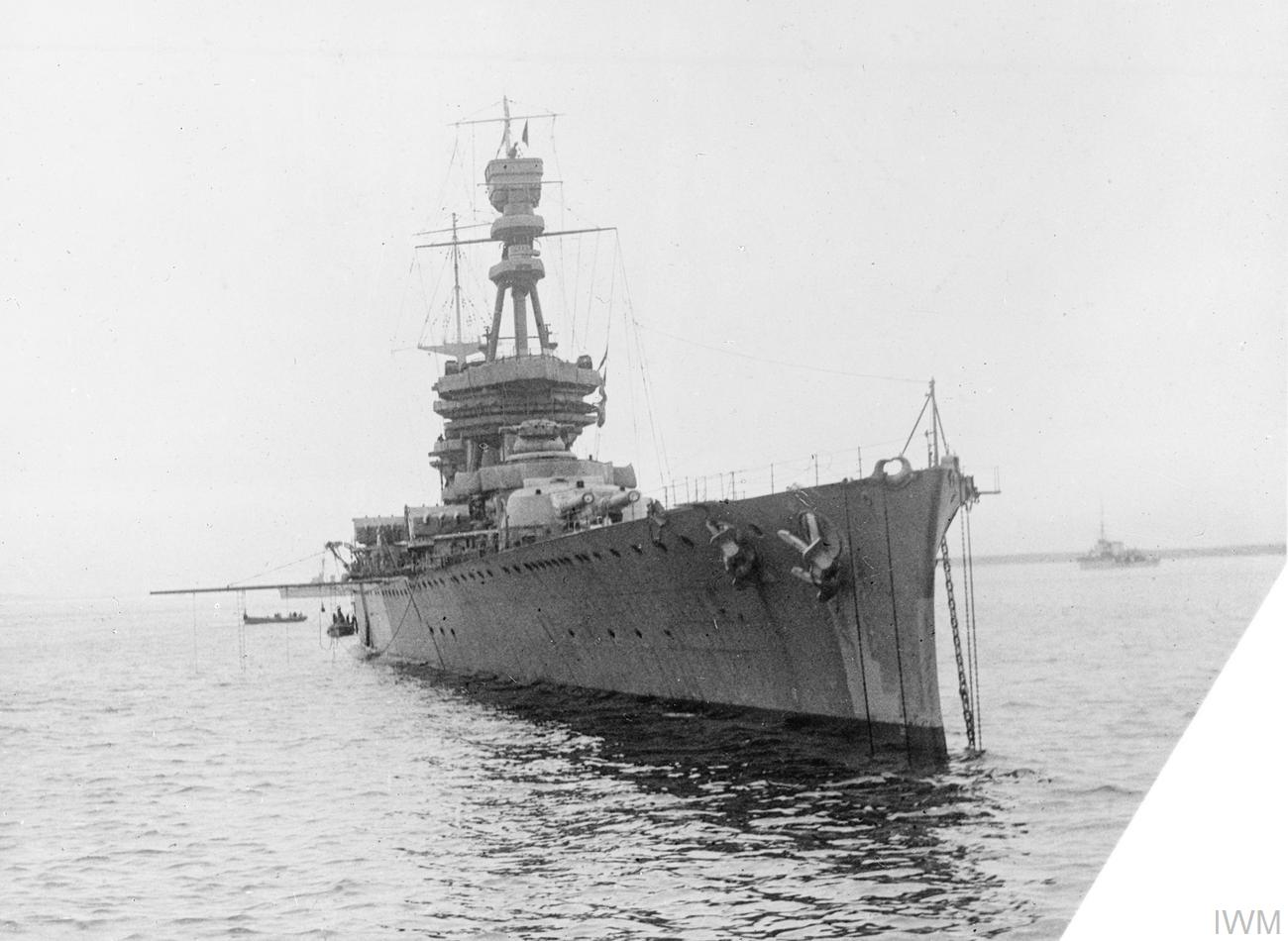
HMS Glorious

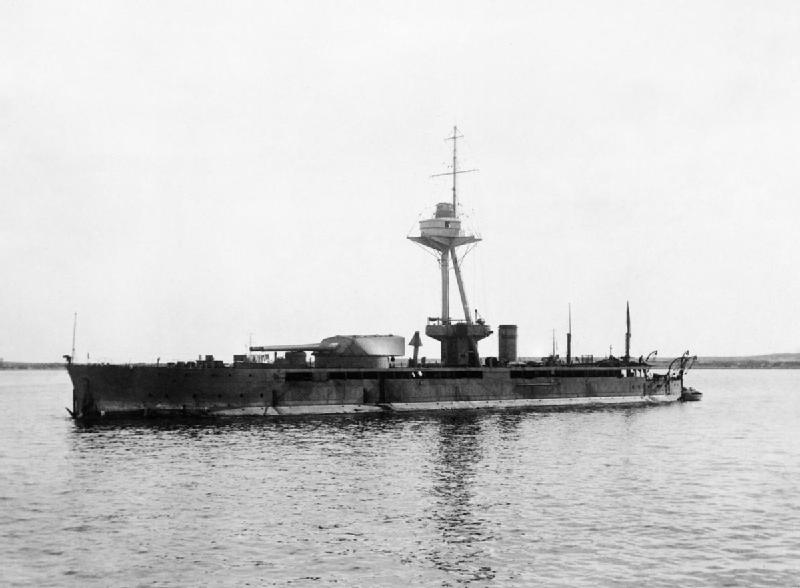
HMS Havelock

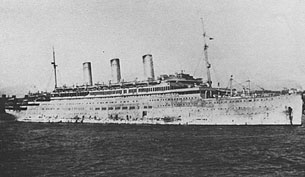
Statendam (launched as Justicia)

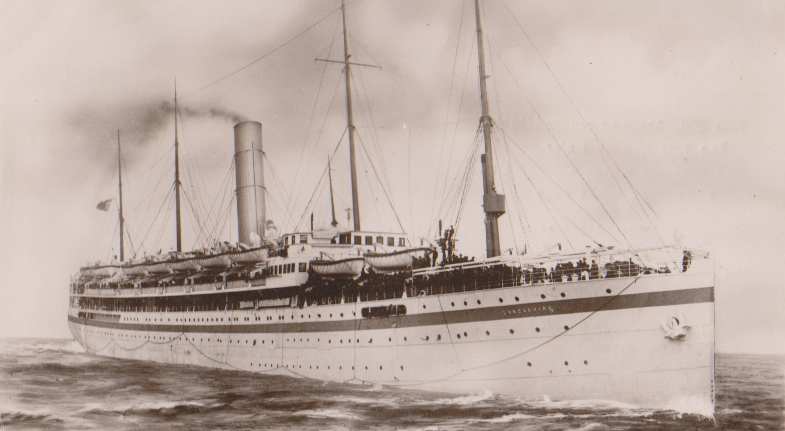
Lancashire

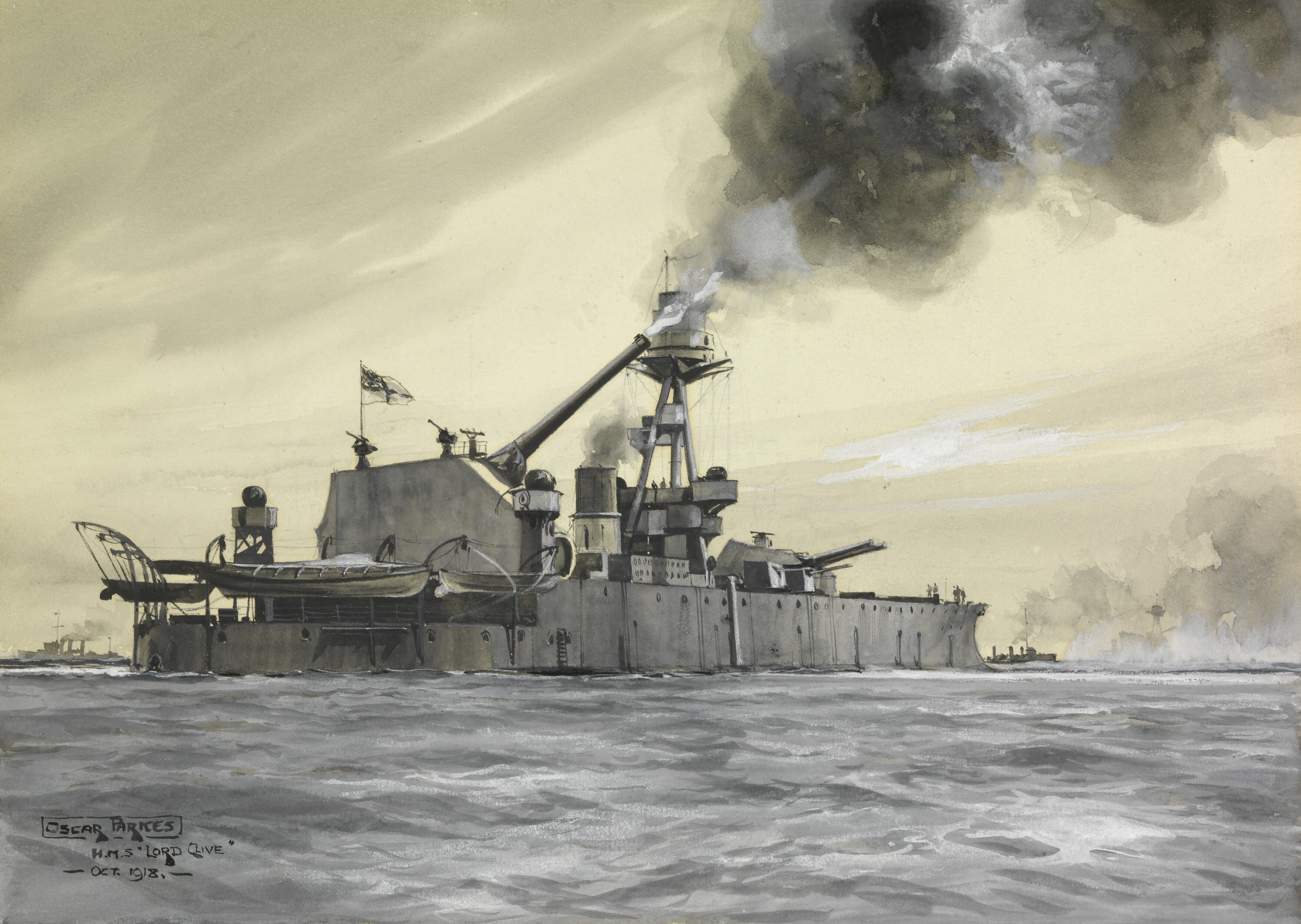
HMS Lord Clive

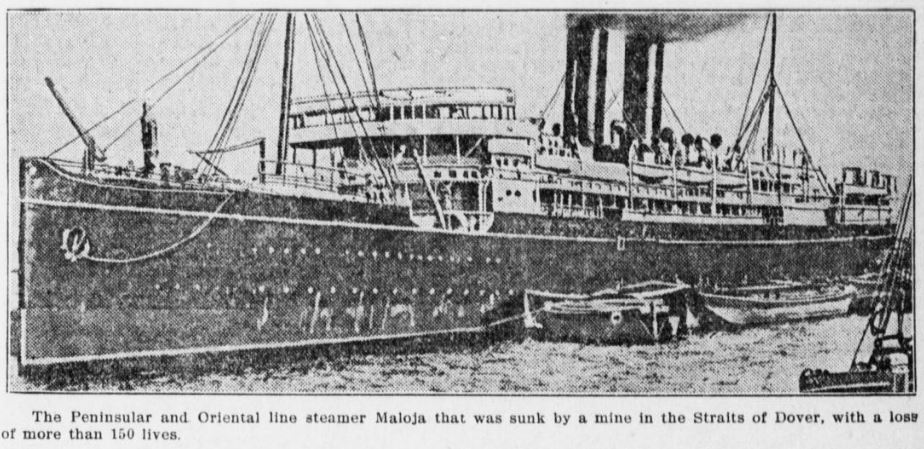
Maloja

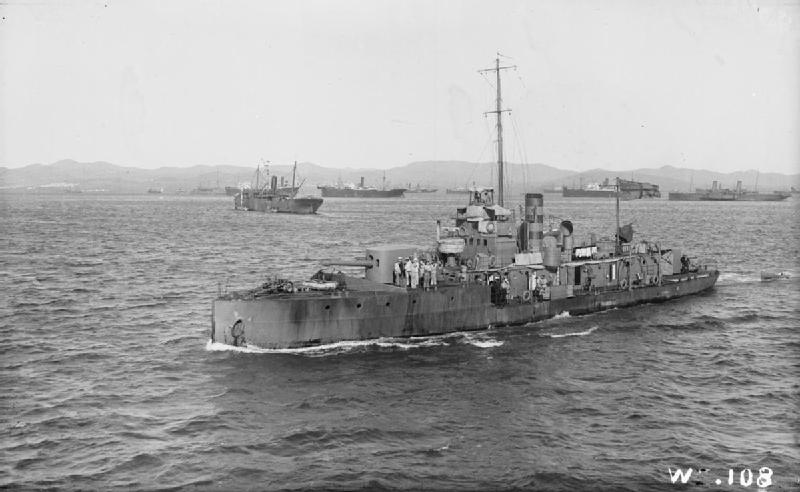
HMS M30

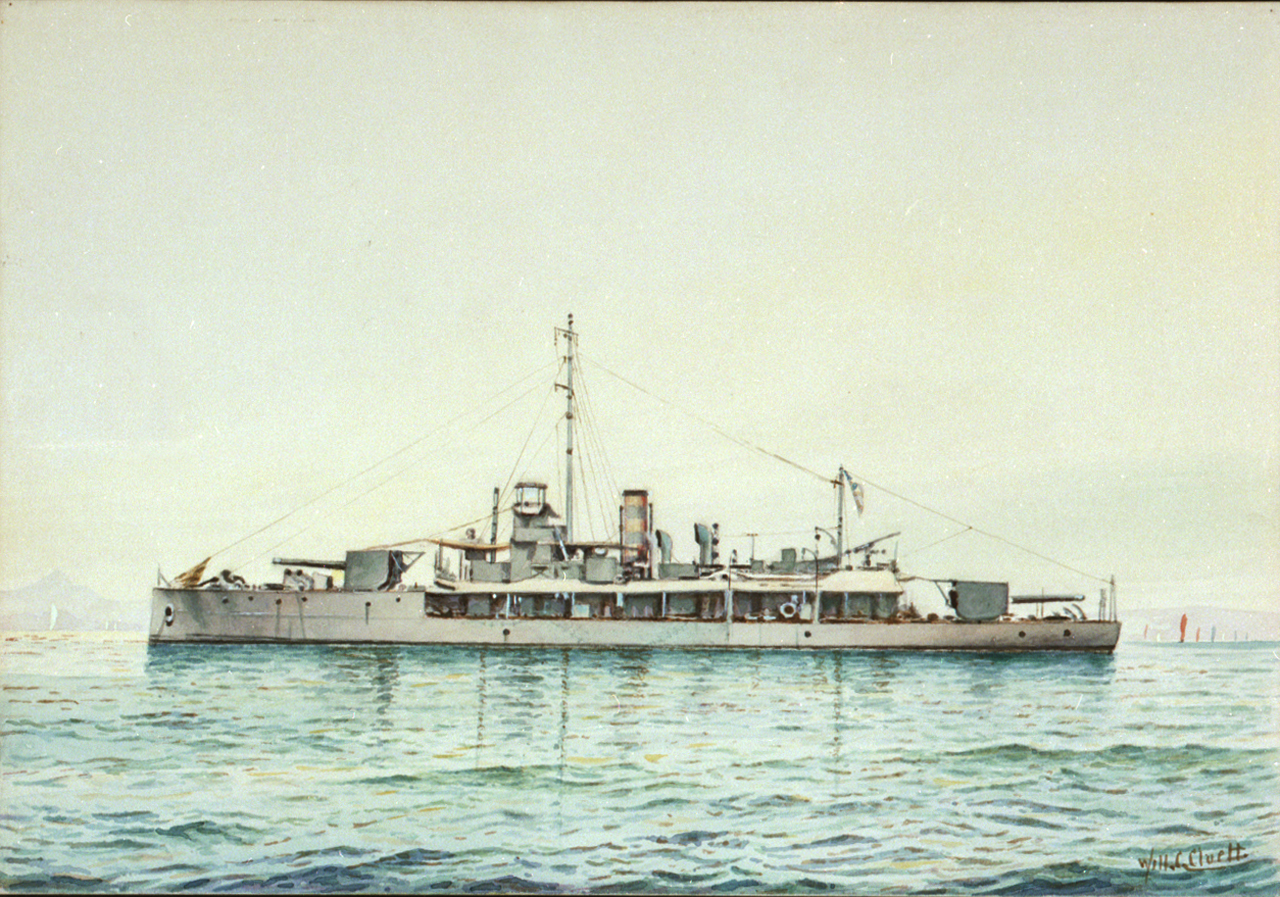
HMS M31

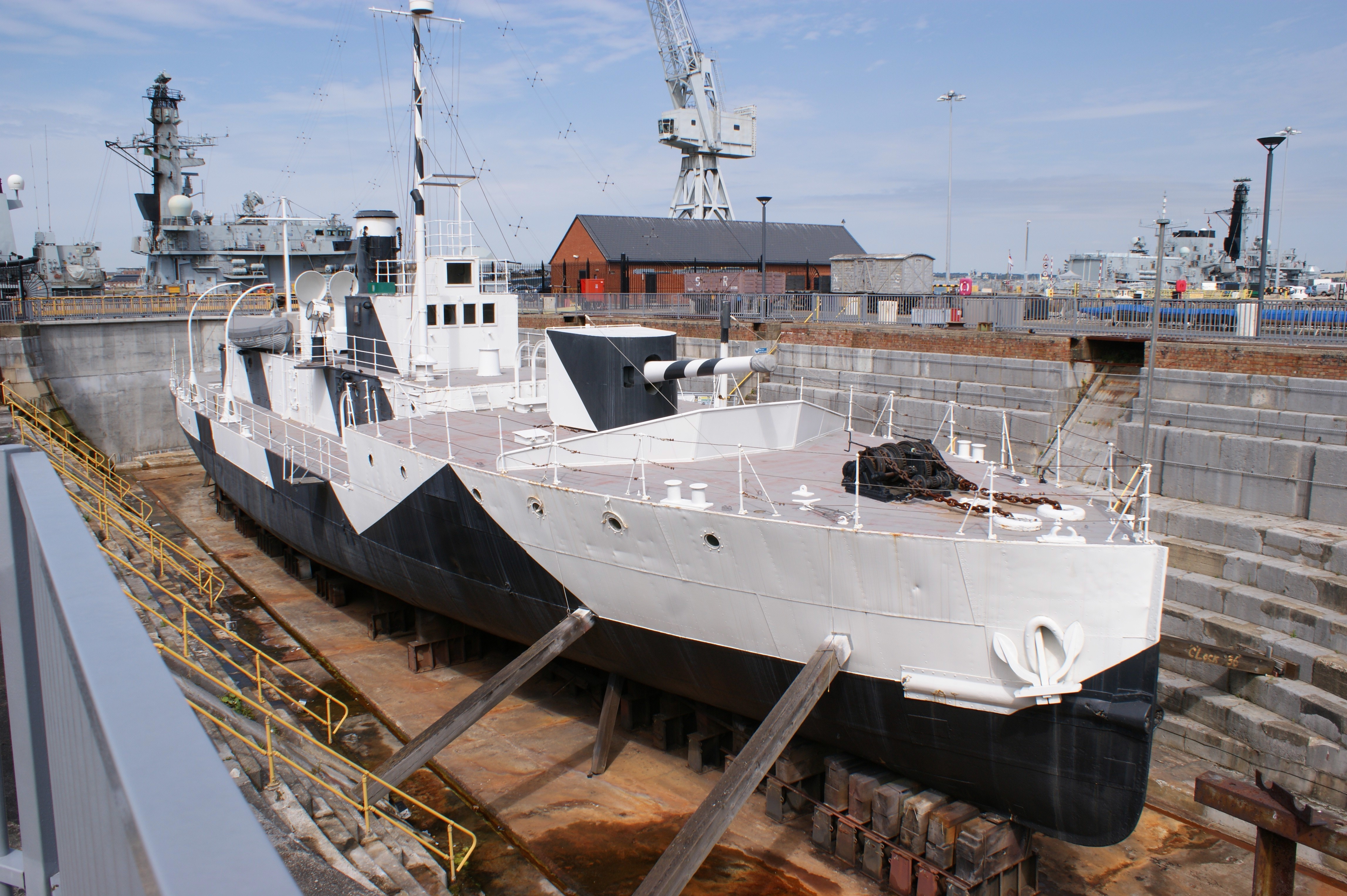
HMS M33

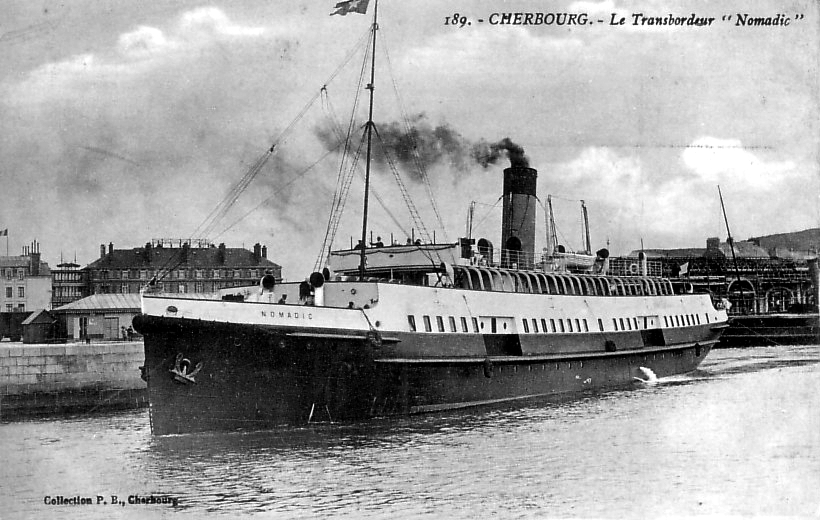
Nomadic

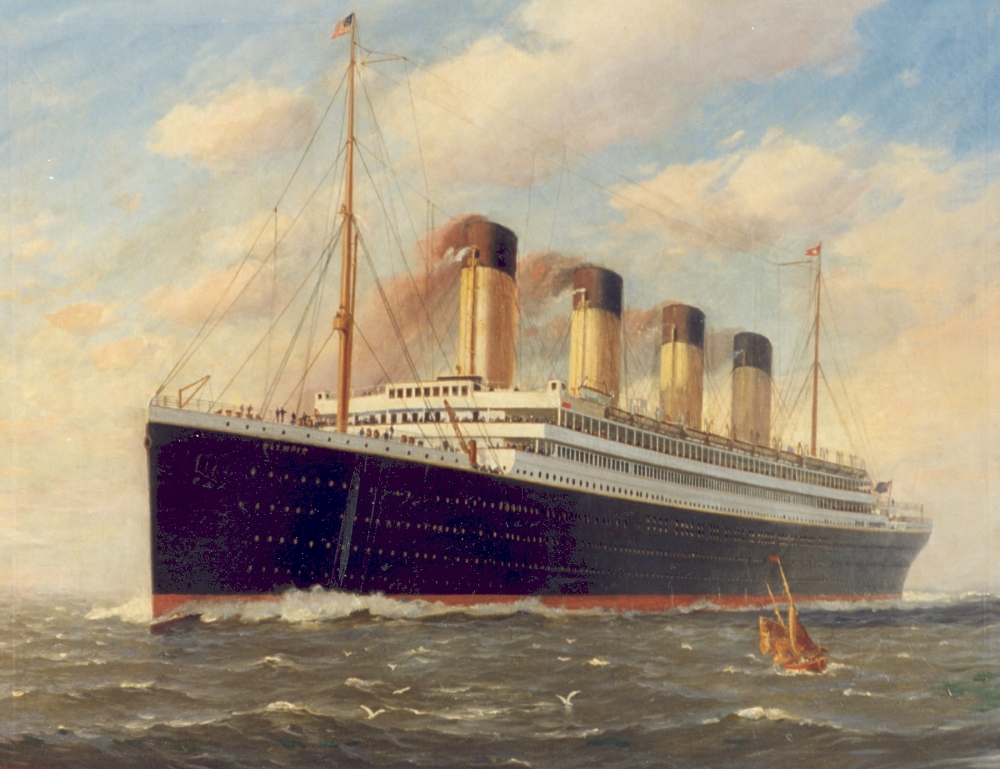
Olympic

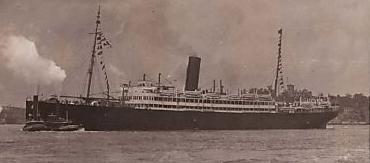
Orduna

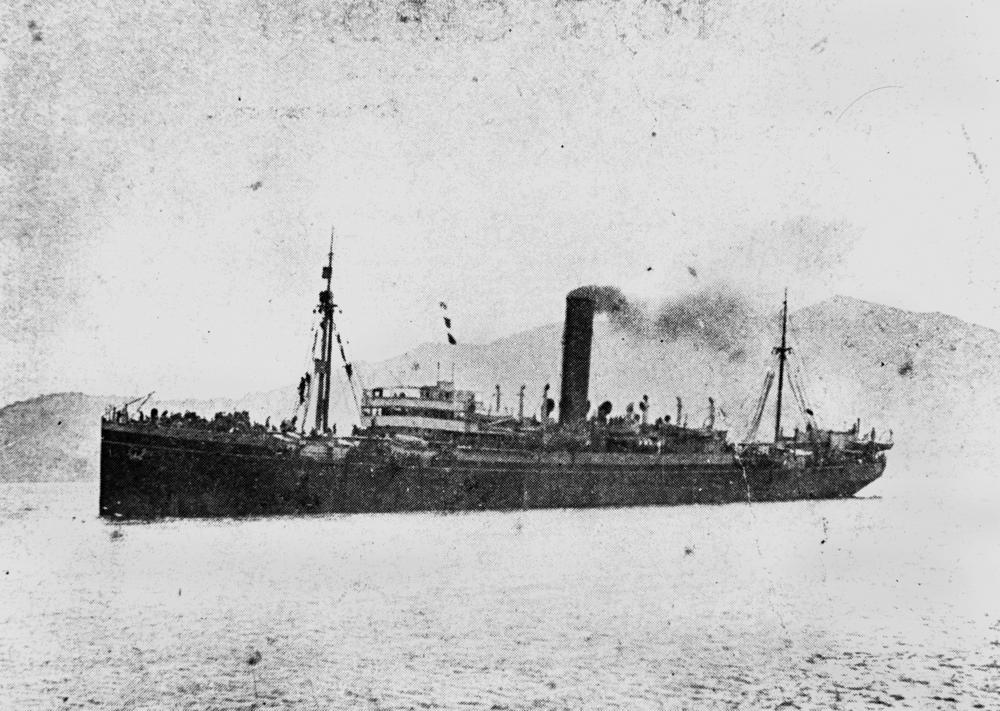
Pakeha

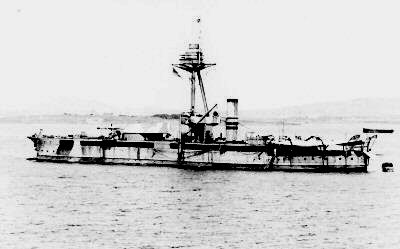
HMS Raglan

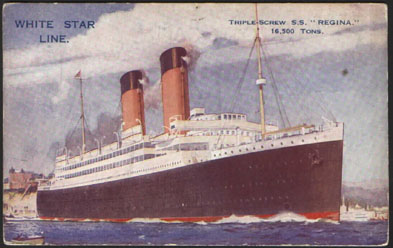
Regina

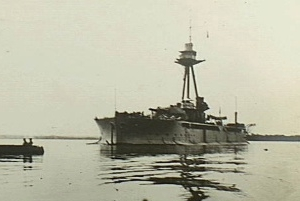
HMS Sir Thomas Picton

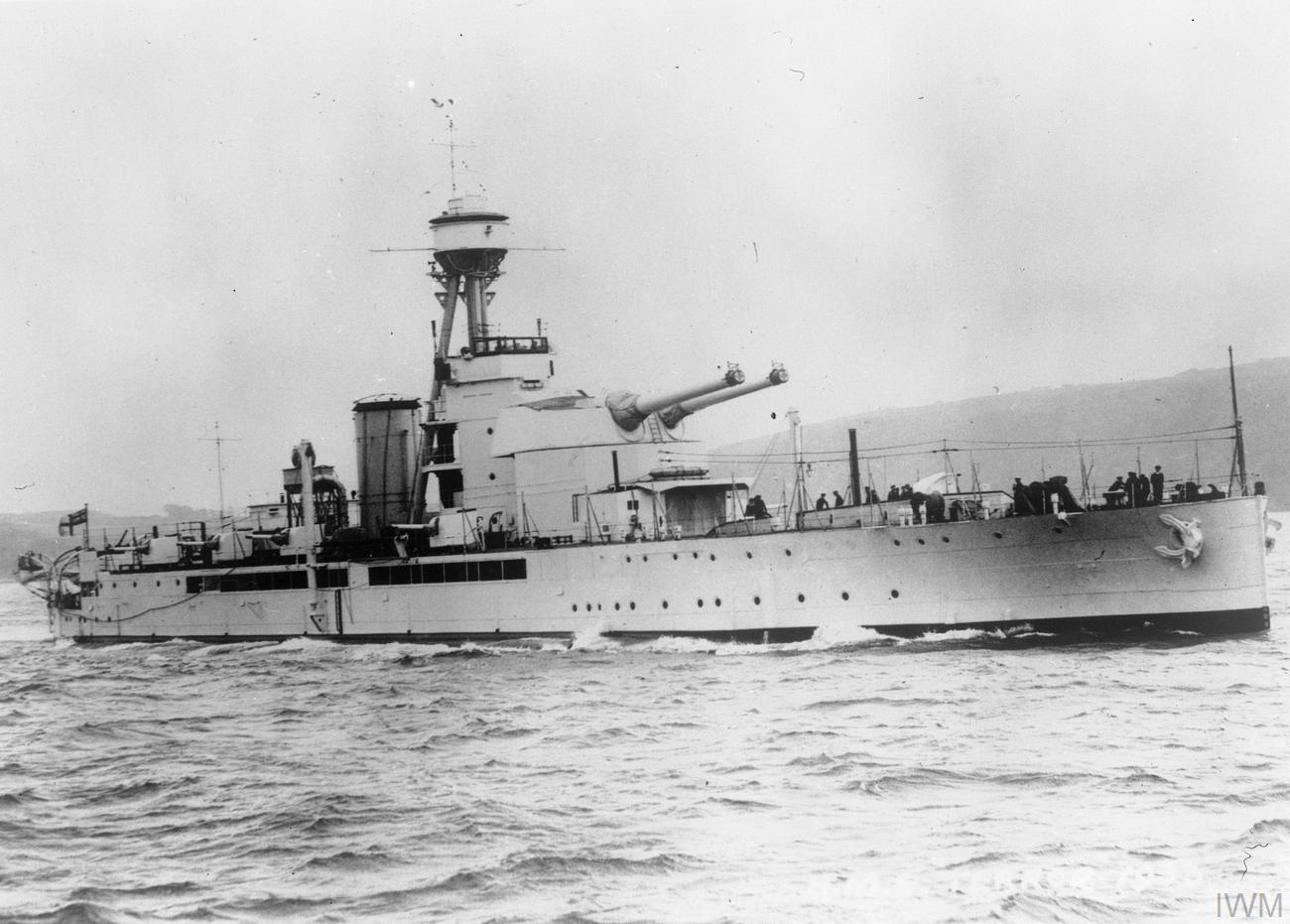
HMS Terror

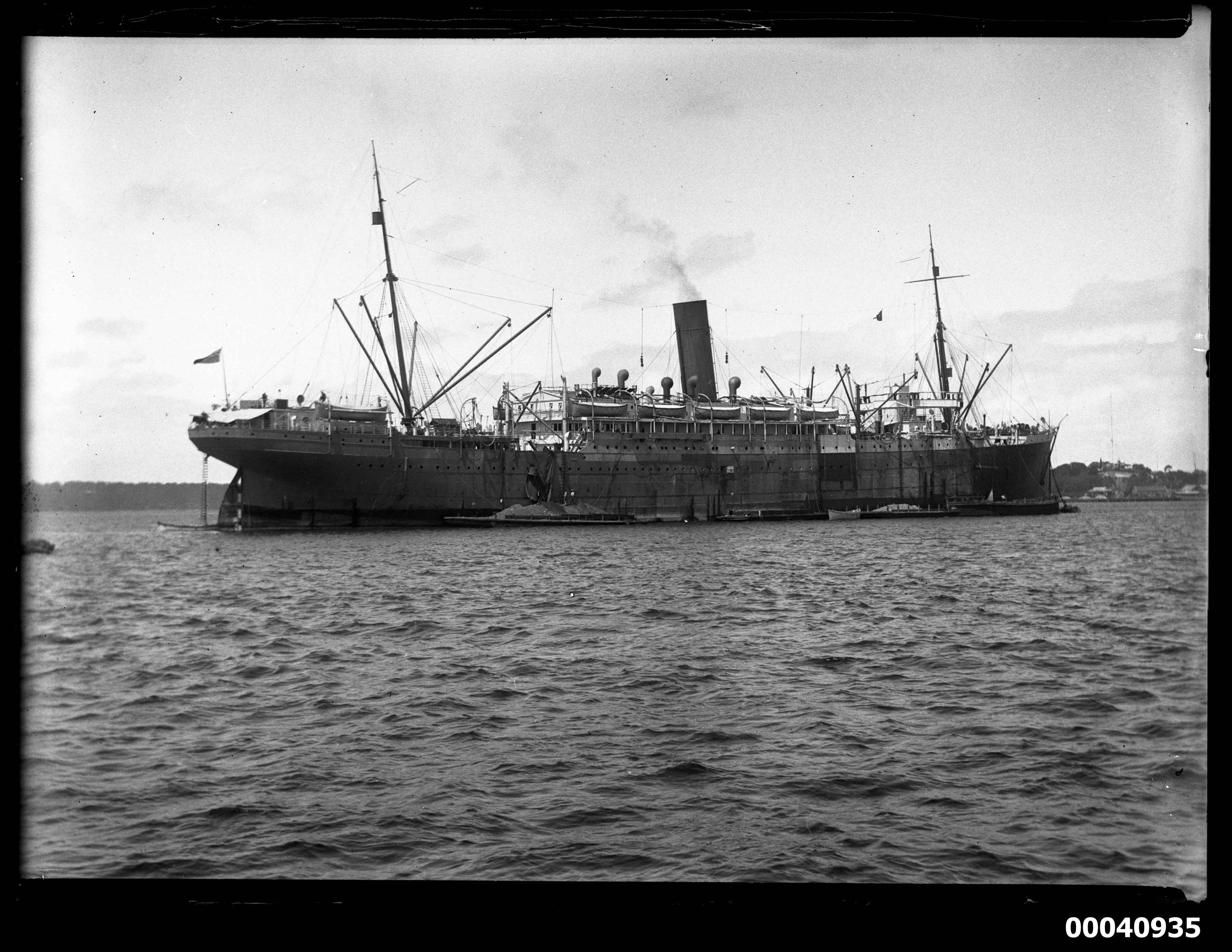
Themistocles

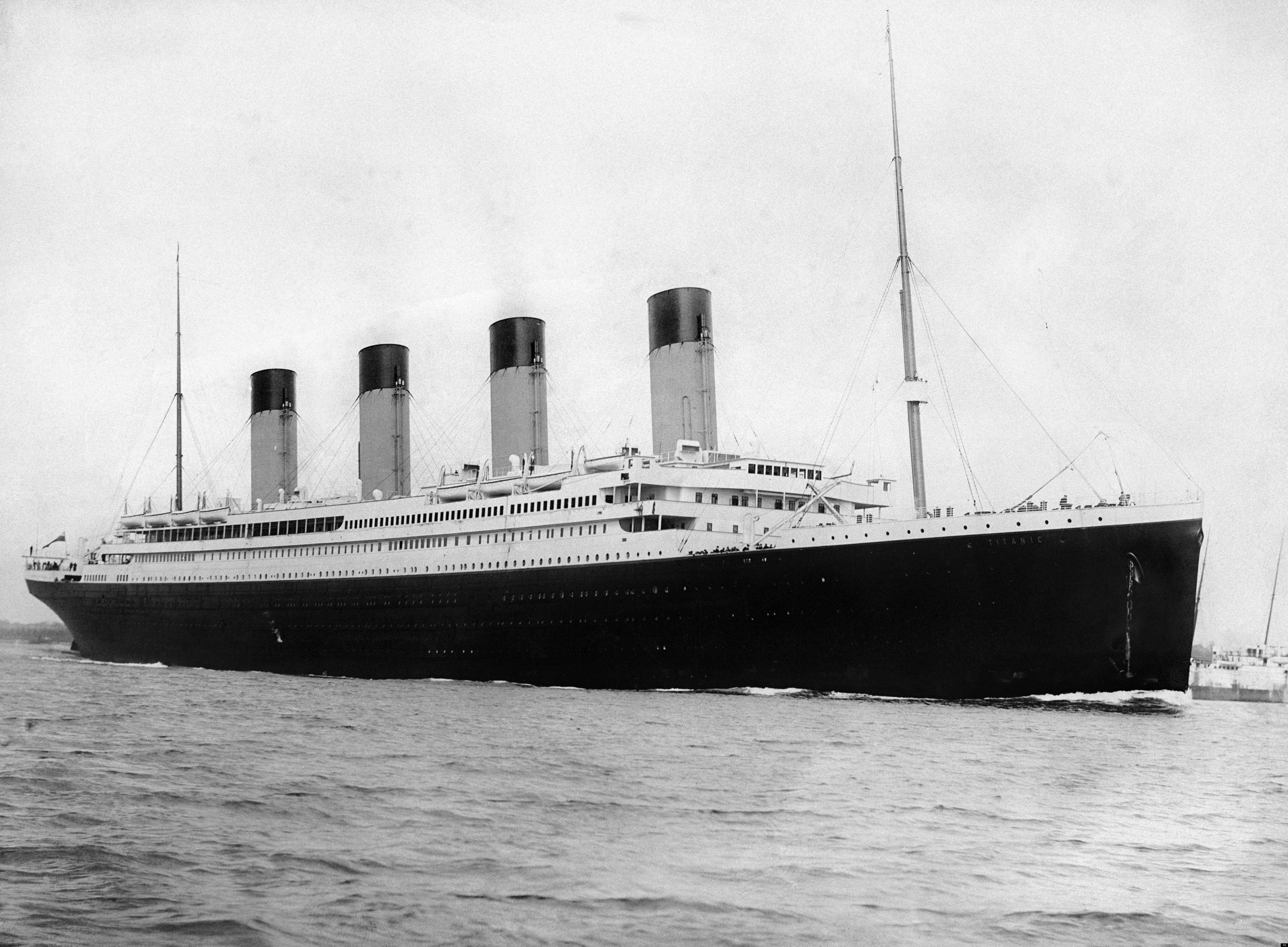
RMS Titanic

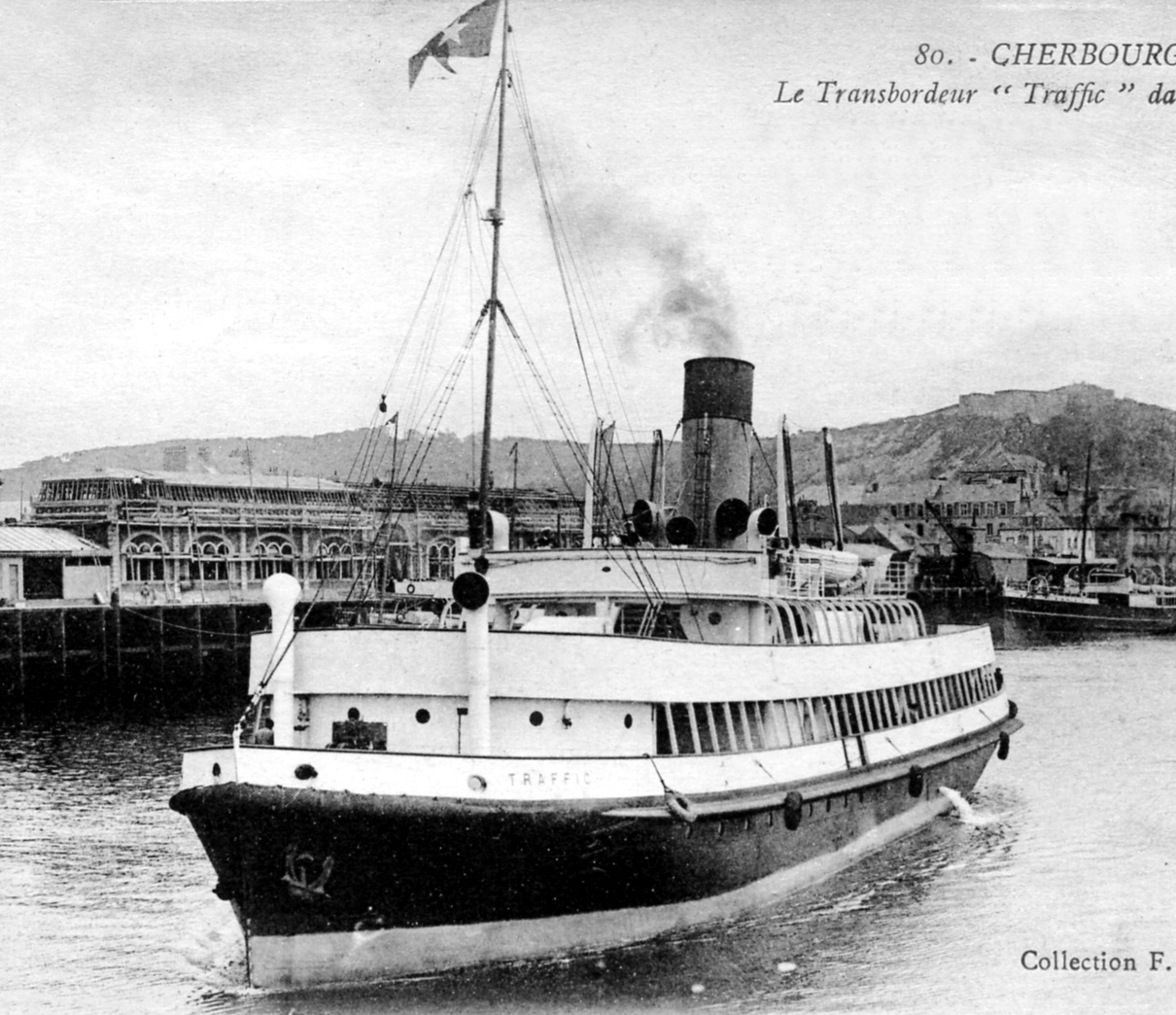
Traffic

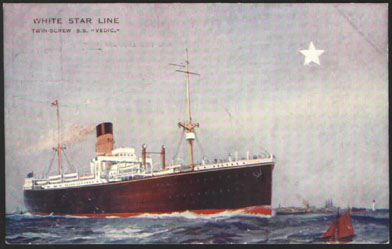
Vedic

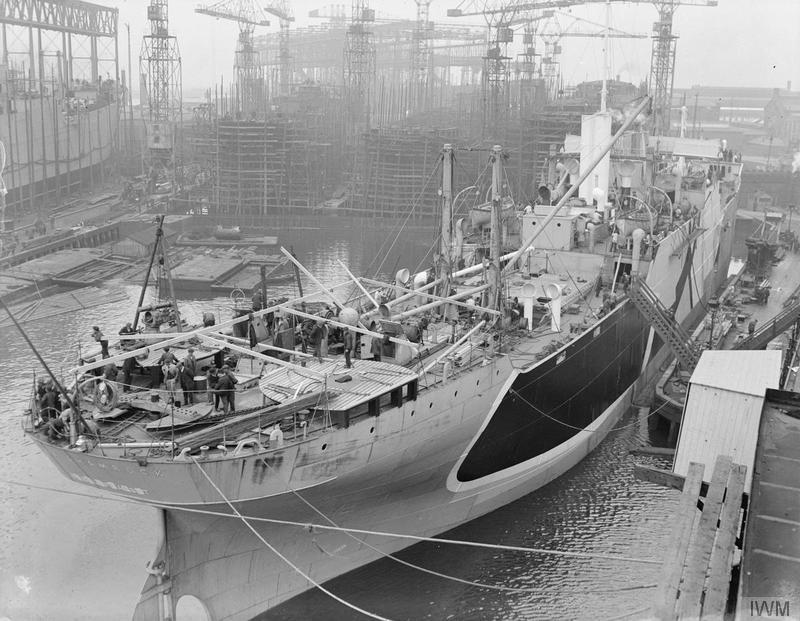
War Shamrock

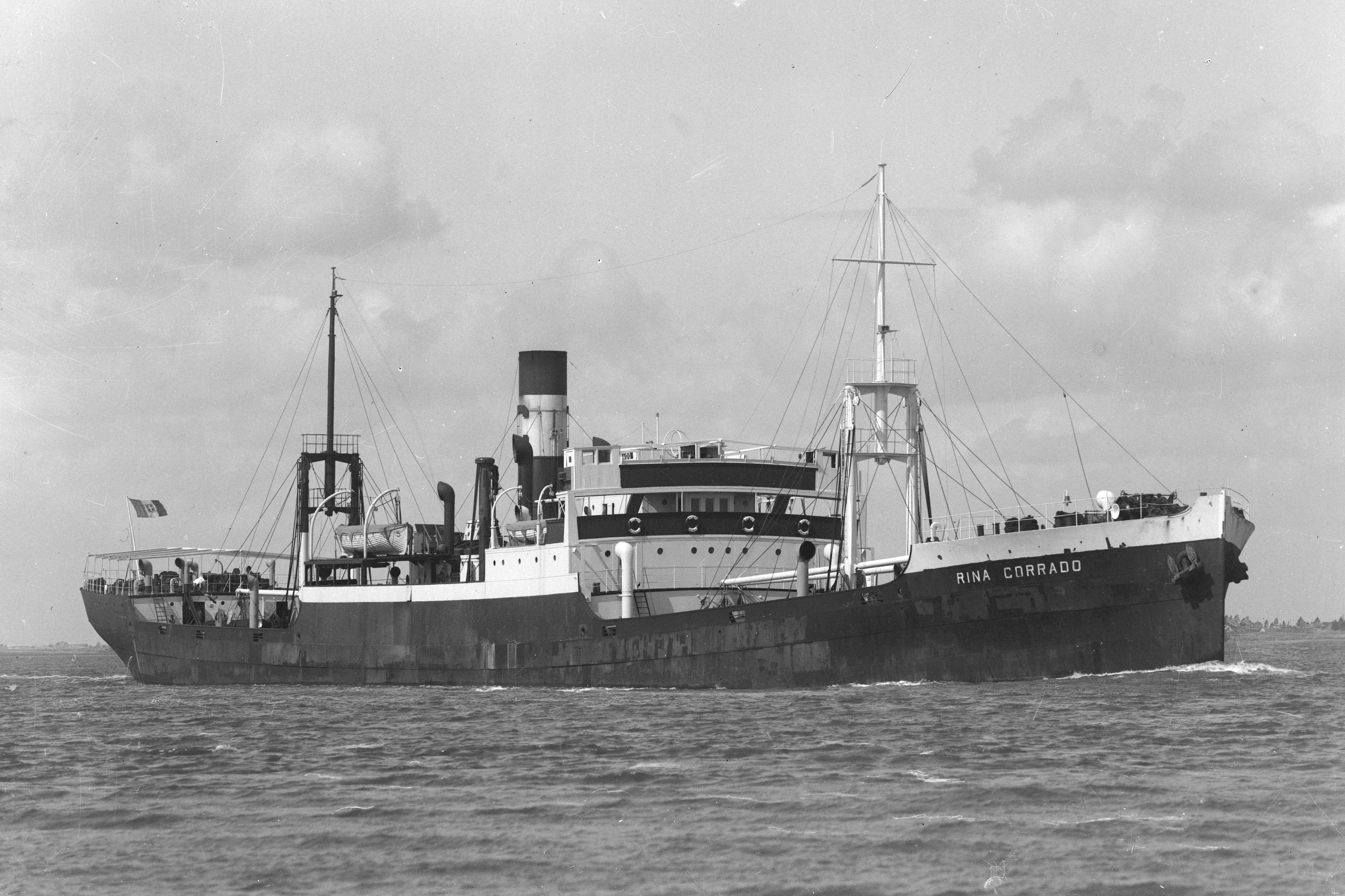
Rina Corrado built as War Snake

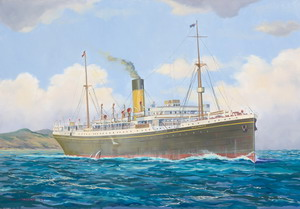
Zealandic

== 1920s ==
- SS Ekari, cargo ship for Elder Dempster, launched 12 January 1920, completed 13 April 1920.
- SS War Pageant, N-type cargo ship for Elder Dempster, launched 25 March 1920, completed as New Columbia 30 June 1920.
- Britmex No.6, oil barge for the British-Mexican Petroleum Company (BMPC), launched 7 April 1920, completed 28 May 1920.
- Britmex No.7, oil barge for BMPC, launched 7 April 1920, completed 3 June 1920.
- Britmex No.2, oil barge for BMPC, launched 15 April 1920, completed 16 June 1920.
- Britmex No.3, oil barge for BMPC, launched 15 April 1920, completed 17 June 1920.
- MV Glenogle, cargo ship for Glen Line, launched 15 April 1920, completed 19 August 1920.
- Britmex No.8, oil barge for BMPC, launched 22 April 1920, completed 8 June 1920.
- MV Dorsetshire, cargo ship for Bibby Steamship Co, launched 22 April 1920, completed 14 August 1920, scrapped 1954.
- Britmex No.4, oil barge for BMPC, launched 29 April 1920, completed 4 June 1920.
- Britmex No.5, oil barge for BMPC, launched 29 April 1920, completed 1 July 1920.
- MV La Paz, cargo ship for PSNC, launched 6 May 1920, completed 25 September 1920.
- SS Bonheur, Type A cargo ship for Lamport & Holt, launched 17 June 1920, completed 7 October 1920.
- SS War Bamboo, A-type cargo ship for Shipping Controller, launched 1 July 1920, completed as Boswell 19 November 1920.
- SS Inveritchen, oil tanker for BMPC, launched 13 July 1920, completed 1 October 1920.

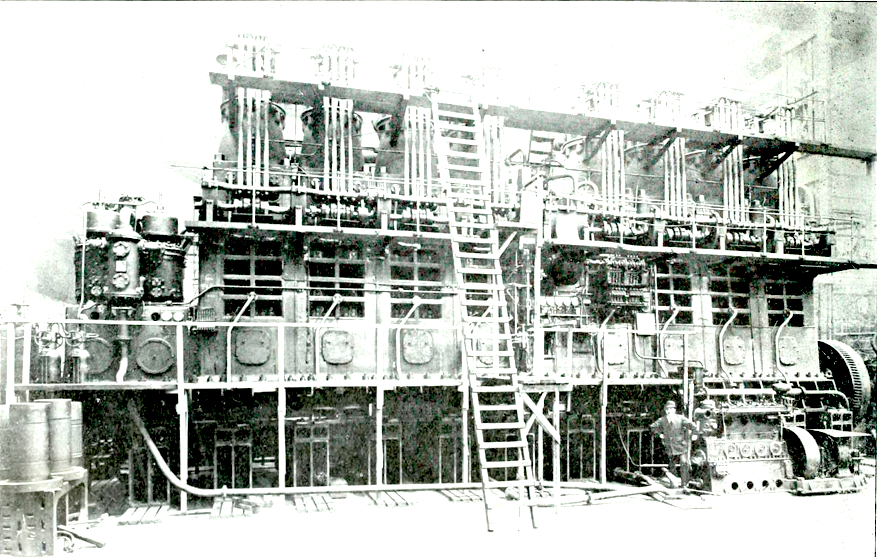
One of the eight-cylinder 3200 I.H.P. Harland and Wolff—Burmeister & Wain Diesel engines installed in the motorship Glenapp. This was the highest powered Diesel engine yet installed in a ship. (1920)

- MV Glenapp, cargo ship for Glen Line, launched 14 July 1920, completed 14 December 1920.
- SS Inverleith, oil tanker for BMPC, launched 26 August 1920, completed 3 March 1921.
- SS Calgary, refrigerated cargo ship for Elder Dempster, launched 27 August 1920, completed 3 February 1921.
- SS Inverampton, oil tanker for BMPC, launched 9 September 1920, completed 1 November 1920.
- MV Glengarry, cargo ship for Glen Line, launched 30 September 1920, completed 23 February 1922.
- MV Lobos, cargo ship for PSNC, launched 14 October 1920, completed 14 October 1921.
- Britmex No.1, oil barge for BMPC, launched 30 October 1920, completed 26 November 1920.
- Britmex No.9, oil barge for BMPC, launched 30 October 1920, completed 23 December 1920.
- SS Redbreast, coaster for Coast Lines, launched 14 October 1920, completed 11 February 1921.
- SS Bompata (1920), B-type cargo ship for Elder Dempster, launched 28 October 1920, completed 16 January 1923.
- SS Pittsburgh, launched 11 November 1920, completed 25 May 1922, entered service 1922, renamed Pennland, sunk 1942.
- SS Baradine, passenger ship for P&O, launched 27 November 1920, completed 18 August 1921.
- SS Lady Valentia, coaster for Coast Lines, launched 29 November 1920, completed 16 November 1921.
- Britmex No.10, oil barge for BMPC, launched 16 December 1920, completed 7 March 1921.
- SS Oroya, passenger ship for PSNC, launched 16 December 1920, completed 22 March 1923.
- SS Gorilla, coaster for Coast Lines, launched 20 December 1920, completed 7 February 1922.
- MV Glenbeg, cargo ship for Glen Line, launched 25 December 1920, completed 20 April 1922.
- Britmex No.11, oil barge for BMPC, launched 28 December 1920, completed 8 March 1921.
- SS Cochrane, refrigerated cargo ship for Elder Dempster, launched 28 December 1920, completed 8 March 1923.
- MV Leighton, cargo ship for Lamport and Holt, launched 11 January 1921, completed 13 October 1921.
- RMS Windsor Castle, passenger ship for Union Castle, launched 9 March 1921, completed 11 March 1922.
- SS Lassell, cargo ship for Lamport & Holt, launched 15 March 1922, completed 22 June 1922.
- MV Losada, cargo ship for PSNC, launched 10 March 1921, completed 1 November 1921.
- SS Francunion, oil barge for British Union Oil Co, launched 14 April 1921, completed 3 May 1921.
- SS Inverurie, oil tanker for BMPC, launched 9 June 1921, completed 23 November 1922.
- MV Lochkatrine, passenger ship for Royal Mail Line, launched 5 August 1921, completed 18 January 1922.
- MV Dinteldyk, cargo ship for Holland America Line, launched 1 September 1921, completed 10 February 1922.
- SS Sophocles, passenger ship for Aberdeen Line, launched 22 September 1921, completed 2 February 1922, maiden voyage 1 March 1922, renamed Tamaroa, scrapped 1957.
- MV Linnell, cargo ship for Lamport & Holt, launched 4 October 1921, completed 27 December 1921.
- SS Barrabool, passenger ship for P&O, launched 3 November 1921, completed 30 March 1922.
- SS Bendigo, passenger ship for P&O, launched 26 January 1922, completed 9 August 1922.
- SS Diogenes, passenger ship for Aberdeen Line, launched 2 March 1922, completed 4 July 1922, maiden voyage 16 August 1922, renamed Mataroa, scrapped 1957.
- SS Eastern Coast, coaster for Coast Lines, launched 10 March 1922, completed 1 June 1922.
- MV Lochgoil, cargo ship for Royal Mail Line, launched 24 April 1922, completed 14 December 1922.
- MV Adda, (Clyde-built), passenger ship for Elder Dempster, launched 25 May 1922, completed 14 November 1922.
- SS Calumet, refrigerated cargo ship for Elder Dempster, launched 1 July 1922, completed 15 March 1923.
- SS Volendam, (Govan-built), passenger ship for Holland America Line, launched 6 July 1922, completed 12 October 1922, maiden voyage 4 November 1922, scrapped 1952.
- SS Doric, passenger ship for White Star Line, launched 8 August 1922, completed 29 May 1923, maiden voyage 8 June 1923, scrapped November 1935.
- SS Ayrshire Coast, coaster for Coast Lines, launched 22 August 1922, completed 5 October 1922.
- SS Lurcher, coaster for Coast Lines, launched 30 September 1922, completed 11 November 1922.
- SS Invergoil, oil tanker for BMPC, launched 21 September 1922, completed 9 November 1922.
- MV Drechtdyk, cargo ship for Holland America Line, launched 22 October 1922, completed 22 March 1923.
- Ferry No.6, ferry for Clyde Navigation Co, launched and completed 7 November 1922.
- Ferry No.7, ferry for Clyde Navigation Co, launched and completed 7 November 1922.
- SS Veendam, passenger ship for Holland America Line, launched 18 November 1922, completed 29 March 1923, maiden voyage 18 April 1923, scrapped 1953.
- MV Ediba, passenger ship for African Steamship Co, launched 7 December 1922, completed 18 April 1923.
- SS Davisian, cargo ship for F Leyland, launched 16 January 1923.
- SS Inveravon, oil tanker for BMPC, launched 18 January 1923, completed 27 March 1923.
- SS Invergordon, oil tanker for BMPC, launched 20 January 1923, completed 5 April 1923. Built by John Brown & Co Ltd., Clydebank, as a sub-contract from Harland & Wolff. Renamed Mount Helmos in 1937. Torpedoed 24 November 1942 by German submarine U-181.
- MV Araby, cargo ship for David MacIver & Co, launched 1 February 1923, completed 16 March 1923.
- RMS Mooltan, passenger ship for P&O, launched 15 February 1923, completed 22 September 1923, maiden voyage 5 October 1923, scrapped 1954.
- SS Delilian, passenger ship for F Leyland & Co, launched 16 February 1923.
- SS Minnewaska, passenger ship for the Atlantic Transport Line, launched 22 March 1923, completed 25 August 1923, maiden voyage 1 September 1923, scrapped 1934.
- SS Dorelian, cargo ship for F Leyland & Co, launched 4 April 1923, completed 15 May 1923.
- MV Laguna, cargo ship for PSNC, launched 19 April 1923, completed 3 July 1923.
- RMS Maloja, passenger ship for P&O, launched 19 April 1923, completed 25 October 1923, maiden voyage 2 November 1923, scrapped 1954.
- SS Oakton, cargo ship for Matthews Steamship Co, launched 30 April 1923, completed 31 May 1923.
- SS Gujarat, passenger ship for Bank Line, launched 11 October 1923, completed 20 December 1923.
- SS Tonbridge, ferry for Southern Railway Company, launched 3 June 1924, completed 21 July 1924.
- MV Elmworth, cargo ship for Dalgleish, launched 3 September 1924, completed 13 November 1924.
- SS Invergarry, oil tanker for BMPC, launched 15 November 1923, completed 17 April 1924.
- MV Kathiawar, passenger ship for Bank Line, launched 22 November 1923, completed 15 February 1924.
- MV Lochmonar, cargo ship for Royal Mail Line, launched 8 December 1923, completed 26 June 1924.
- SS Minnetonka, passenger ship for Atlantic Transport Line, launched 10 January 1924, completed 24 April 1924, scrapped 1934.
- MV Luxmi, passenger ship for Bank Line, launched 19 January 1924, completed 25 March 1924.
- SS Cedarton, cargo ship for Matthews Steamship Co, launched 22 January 1924, completed 5 April 1924.
- MV Glenshiel, cargo ship for Glen Line, launched 24 January 1924, completed 22 May 1924.
- SS Cable Enterprise, cable layer for Western Telegraph Co, launched 8 February 1924, completed 20 May 1924.
- SS Birchton, cargo ship for Matthews Steamship Co, launched 21 February 1924, completed 12 April 1924.
- SS Cariboo, refrigerated cargo ship for Elder Dempster, launched 22 March 1924, completed 16 August 1924.
- MV Inverbank, cargo ship for Bank Line, launched 24 March 1924, completed 29 May 1924.
- MV Glenbank, cargo ship for Bank Line, launched 23 April 1924, completed 27 June 1924.
- MV Birchbank, cargo ship for Bank Line, launched 2 June 1924, completed 4 September 1924.
- SS Minster, ferry for Southern Railway Company, launched 17 June 1924, completed 18 August 1924.
- SS Papuan Chief, cargo ship for Steamship Trading Co, launched 1 July 1924, completed 24 September 1924.
- MV Asuka Maru, cargo ship for Nippon Yusen Kaisha Line, launched 2 July 1924, completed 12 November 1924.
- MV Cedarbank, cargo ship for Bank Line, launched 7 July 1924, completed 16 October 1924.
- MV Comliebank, cargo ship for Bank Line, launched 3 September 1924, completed 6 December 1924.
- SS Statendam, passenger ship for Holland America Line, launched 11 September 1924, completed 13 April 1927.
- SS Procris, cargo ship for J&P Hutchinson Ltd, launched 26 September 1924, completed 27 November 1924.
- SS Inverglass, oil tanker for BMPC, launched 30 September 1924, completed 25 November 1924.
- MV Clydebank, cargo ship for Bank Line, launched 13 October 1924, completed 2 January 1925.
- SS Redline No.1, oil tanker for BMPC, launched 13 October 1924, completed 5 November 1924.
- SS Razmak, (Clyde-built), passenger ship for P&O, launched 16 October 1924, completed 26 February 1925, renamed Monowai in 1930, scrapped in 1960.
- SS Fendris, cargo ship for J&P Hutchinson Ltd, launched 25 November 1924, completed 5 February 1925.
- MV Oakworth, cargo ship for RS Dalglish Ltd, launched 26 November 1924, completed 12 February 1925.
- MV Thistleros, cargo ship for Allan Black & Co, launched 9 December 1924, completed 19 March 1925.
- MV Alynbank, cargo ship for Bank Line, launched 15 January 1925, completed 26 March 1925.
- MV Elmbank, cargo ship for Bank Line, launched 12 February 1925, completed 23 April 1925.
- SS Inverlago, oil tanker for Lago Shipping Co, launched 25 February 1925, completed 24 March 1925.
- SS Inverossa, oil tanker for Lago Shipping Co, launched 26 March 1925, completed 24 April 1925.
- SS Rawalpindi, (Clyde-built), passenger ship for P&O, launched 26 March 1925, completed 3 September 1925, renamed HMS Rawalpindi 1939, sunk by enemy action 23 November 1939.
- SS Inverpool, oil tanker for BMPC, launched 6 April 1925, completed 20 May 1925.
- MV Forresbank, cargo ship for Bank Line, launched 8 April 1925, completed 11 June 1925.
- SS Invercaibo, oil tanker for Lago Shipping Co, launched 23 April 1925, completed 9 June 1925.
- SS Hythe, ferry for Southern Railway Co, launched 24 April 1925, completed 5 June 1925.
- MV King James, cargo ship for King Line, launched 8 May 1925, completed 28 November 1925.
- MV Nairnbank, cargo ship for Bank Line, launched 21 May 1925, completed 7 July 1925.
- SS Haslemere, ferry for Southern Railway Co, launched 22 May 1925, completed 6 July 1925.
- SS Inverruba, oil tanker for Lago Shipping Co, launched 26 May 1925, completed 30 June 1925.
- MV Weirbank, cargo ship for Bank Line, launched 18 June 1925, completed 9 September 1925.
- SS Whitstable, ferry for Southern Railway Co, launched 23 June 1925, completed 17 August 1925.
- RMS Asturias, passenger ship for Royal Mail Line, launched 7 July 1925, completed 6 February 1926.
- SS King Malcolm, cargo ship for King Line, launched 7 July 1925, completed 29 December 1925.
- MV Larchbank, cargo ship for Bank Line, launched 14 July 1925, completed 1 October 1925.
- SS Rajputana, (Clyde-built), passenger ship for P&O, launched 6 August 1925, completed 30 December 1925, renamed HMS Rajputana 1939, torpedoed and sunk 13 April 1941.
- SS Fratton, ferry for Southern Railway Co, launched 18 August 1925, completed 28 September 1925.
- MV Temuco, tender for P&O, launched 1 September 1925, completed 22 September 1925.
- MV Gascony, cargo ship for David MacIver & Co, launched 2 September 1925, completed 25 November 1925.
- MV Levernbank, cargo ship for Bank Line, launched 24 September 1925, completed 23 November 1925.
- MV Madrid, cargo ship for Argentine Navigation Co, launched 28 October 1925, completed 30 December 1925.
- MV Myrtlebank, cargo ship for Bank Line, launched 29 October 1925, completed 29 December 1925.
- SS Marthara, cargo ship for MacLay& MacIntyre Ltd, launched 28 November 1925, completed 16 January 1926.
- MV Olivebank, cargo ship for Bank Line, launched 3 December 1925, completed 9 February 1926.
- SS Colonial, cargo ship for T&J Harrison, launched 19 December 1925, completed 19 February 1926.
- MV Roma, cargo ship for Argentine Navigation Co, launched 29 December 1925, completed 24 February 1926.
- MV Carnarvon Castle, passenger ship for Union Castle, launched 14 January 1926, completed 26 June 1926, maiden voyage 16 July 1926, scrapped 1963.
- MV Oakbank, cargo ship for Bank Line, launched 18 January 1926, completed 11 March 1926.
- SS Director, cargo ship for T&J Harrison, launched 12 February 1926, completed 8 March 1926.
- MV Speybank, cargo ship for Bank Line, launched 25 February 1926, completed 20 April 1926.
- SS Maidstone, ferry for Southern Railway Co, launched 16 March 1926, completed 30 April 1926.
- MV Accra, passenger ship for Elder Dempster, launched 18 March 1926, completed 17 August 1926, torpedoed and sunk 26 July 1940.
- SS Ringwood, ferry for Southern Railway Co, launched 13 April 1926, completed 14 June 1926.
- MV Springbank, cargo ship for Bank Line, launched 13 April 1926, completed 26 May 1926.
- Begonia, oil barge for Argentine Navigation Co, launched 15 April 1926, completed 26 April 1926.
- SS San Nicolas, oil tanker for Lago Shipping Co, launched 15 April 1926, completed 20 May 1926.
- Boltonia, oil barge for Argentine Navigation Co, launched and completed 28 April 1926.
- ST George Livesey, tug for Southern Gas Co, launched 20 May 1926, completed 12 May 1928.
- ST Papudo, tug for PSNC, launched 20 May 1926, completed 2 June 1926.
- SS Ambrosio, oil tanker for Lago Shipping Co, launched 3 June 1926, completed 7 July 1926.
- SS Dolores de Urquiza, train ferry for Entre Ríos Railway Co, launched 10 August 1926, completed 2 October 1926.
- SS Banda, lighter for Elder Dempster, launched 24 August 1926, completed 27 August 1926.
- SS Berma, barge for New York & West Africa SN Co, launched 24 August 1926, completed 27 August 1926.
- MV Apapa, passenger ship for Elder Dempster, launched 26 August 1926, completed 28 January 1927, bombed and sunk 15 November 1940.
- MV Koolinda, cargo ship for Western Australian Government, launched 26 August 1926, completed 23 December 1926.
- SS London Mammoth, crane pontoon for the Port of London Authority, launched 9 September 1926, completed 16 July 1927, scrapped 2011.
- RMS Alcantara, passenger ship for Royal Mail Line, launched 23 September 1926, completed 18 February 1927, scrapped 1958.
- SS Sin Kheng Seng, coaster for McKie & Baxter Ltd, launched 17 February 1927, completed 2 April 1927.
- MV Paua, oil tanker for Nederland Stoomboot Co, launched 14 April 1927, completed 9 June 1927.
- Encina, lighter for Argentine Navigation Co, launched 5 May 1927, completed 9 May 1927.
- Enea, lighter for Argentine Navigation Co, launched 5 May 1927, completed 24 May 1927.
- SS Icotea, oil tanker for Lago Shipping Co, launched 26 May 1927, completed 17 June 1927.
- SS Lagunilla, tanker for Lago Shipping Co, launched 26 May 1927, completed 16 June 1927.
- SS La Salina, oil tanker for Lago Shipping Co, launched 31 May 1927, completed 28 June 1927.
- SS Minmi, collier for J&A Brown Ltd, launched 31 May 1927, completed 30 June 1927.
- D1, barge for Elder Dempster, launched 9 June 1927, completed 16 July 1927.
- D2, barge for Elder Dempster, launched 9 June 1927, completed 26 July 1927.
- Erata, lighter for Argentine Navigation Co, launched 14 June 1927, completed 5 July 1927.
- MV Dunkwa, cargo ship for Elder Dempster, launched 15 June 1927, completed 24 August 1927.
- MV Agatha, tanker for Nederland Indische Tank Stoomvaart Maatschappij, launched 16 June 1927, completed 8 September 1927.
- SS Grantleyhall, cargo ship for West Hartlepool Steamship Co, launched 16 June 1927, completed 16 August 1927.
- SS Laurentic, passenger ship for White Star Line, launched 16 June 1927, completed 1 November 1927, maiden voyage 12 November 1927, torpedoed and sunk 3 November 1940.
- D3, barge for Elder Dempster, launched 20 June 1927, completed 13 July 1927.
- La Falaise, yacht for Mr James Allen, launched 28 June 1927, completed 13 July 1927.
- SS San Carlos, oil tanker for Lago Shipping Co, launched 28 June 1927, completed 29 July 1927.
- SS Berta, oil tanker for Anglo Saxon Petroleum Co, launched 30 June 1927, completed 14 July 1927.
- Erica, lighter for Argentine Navigation Co, launched 30 June 1927, completed 5 July 1927.
- SS Eddystone, coaster for Clyde Shipping Co, launched 12 July 1927, completed 15 September 1927.
- MV Petroniella, oil tanker for Nederland Stoomboot Co, launched 12 July 1927, completed 11 October 1927.
- ST Lahej, tug for P&O, launched 19 July 1927, completed 16 October 1927.
- ST Portwey, tug for Portland & Weymouth Coaling Co, launched 10 August 1927, completed 28 April 1928.
- SS Brigida, oil tanker for Anglo Saxon Petroleum Co, launched 11 August 1927, completed 30 August 1927.
- MV Dixcove, cargo ship for Elder Dempster, launched 25 August 1927, completed 21 October 1927.
- MV Kheti, cargo ship for James Moss Ltd, launched 31 August 1927, completed 25 October 1927.
- SS Oranjestad, oil tanker for Bank Line, launched 1 September 1927, completed 23 September 1927.
- SS Sabaneta, oil tanker for Bank Line, launched 1 September 1927, completed 30 September 1927.
- MV Palacio, cargo ship for MacAndrews & Co, launched 8 September 1927, completed 19 October 1927.
- MV King Edgar, cargo ship for King Line, launched 15 September 1927, completed 30 November 1927.
- MV Paula, oil tanker for Nederland Stoomboot Co, launched 22 September 1927, completed 22 November 1927.
- MV King Edwin, cargo ship for King Line, launched 29 September 1927, completed 20 December 1927.
- SS Uganda, cargo ship for MacLay & MacIntyre Ltd, launched 29 September 1927, completed 4 November 1927.
- ST JJ1, tug for Lago Shipping Co, launched 3 October 1927, completed 6 October 1927.
- ST JJ2, tug for Lago Shipping Co, launched 3 October 1927, completed 6 October 1927.
- ST JJ3, tug for Lago Shipping Co, launched 3 October 1927, completed 6 October 1927.
- ST JJ4, tug for Lago Shipping Co, launched 3 October 1927, completed 6 October 1927.
- SS Zahra, oil tanker for Vacuum Oil Co, launched 5 October 1927, completed 22 November 1927.
- MV Iguazu, passenger ship for Argentine Navigation Co, launched 12 October 1927, completed 26 November 1927.
- MV Pelayo, cargo ship for MacAndrews & Co, launched 12 October 1927, completed 1 December 1927.
- MV King Egbert, cargo ship for King Line, launched 27 October 1927, completed 17 January 1928.
- MV Daru, cargo ship for Elder Dempster, launched 28 October 1927, completed 20 December 1927.
- Sefwi, barge for Elder Dempster, launched 28 November 1927, completed 29 November 1927.
- Wala, barge for Elder Dempster, launched 28 November 1927, completed 29 November 1927.
- MV Pacheco, cargo ship for MacAndrews & Co, launched 10 November 1927, completed 22 December 1927.
- MV King John, cargo ship for King Line, launched 24 November 1927, completed 16 February 1928.
- SS Nimoda, cargo ship for Hain Steamship Co, launched 24 November 1927, completed 19 January 1928.
- MV Pinto, cargo ship for MacAndrews & Co, launched 24 November 1927, completed 2 February 1928.
- ST Cabo Espichel, tug for McKie & Baxter Ltd, launched 29 November 1927, completed 28 March 1928.
- SS Dafila, cargo ship for British & Continental Steamship Co, launched 8 December 1927, completed 10 January 1928.
- MV Ponzano, cargo ship for MacAndrews & Co, launched 21 December 1927, completed 28 February 1928.
- MV King Lud, cargo ship for King Line, launched 22 December 1927, completed 15 March 1928.
- ST Cabo Raso, tug for McKie & Baxter Ltd, launched 29 December 1927, completed 2 August 1928.
- ST Cabo Sardao, tug for McKie & Baxter Ltd, launched 31 December 1927, completed 17 August 1928.
- MV Dagomba, cargo ship for Elder Dempster, launched 24 January 1928, completed 15 March 1928.
- MV King Neptune, cargo ship for King Line, launched 26 January 1928, completed 17 April 1928.
- SS Deal, ferry for Southern Railway Co, launched 10 February 1928, completed 20 March 1928.
- SS Punta Benitez, oil tanker for Lago Shipping Co, launched 21 February 1928, completed 16 March 1928.
- SS Saugor, cargo ship for James Nourse Ltd, launched 21 February 1928, completed 29 March 1928.
- SS Tia Juana, oil tanker for Lago Shipping Co, launched 8 March 1928, completed 4 April 1928.
- MV King Arthur, cargo ship for King Line, launched 22 March 1928, completed 17 May 1928.
- SS Hooiberg, oil tanker for Lago Shipping Co, launched 27 March 1928, completed 25 April 1928.
- MV Delfina Mitre, train ferry for Entre Rios Railway Co, launched 19 April 1928, completed 29 May 1928.
- MV Clydefield, oil tanker for Hunting & Sons, launched 23 April 1928, completed 12 July 1928.
- SS Punta Gorda, oil tanker for Lago Shipping Co, launched 23 April 1928, completed 18 May 1928.
- MV King Stephen, cargo ship for King Line, launched 24 April 1928, completed 14 June 1928.
- MV Highland Monarch, passenger ship for H&W Nelson Ltd, launched 3 May 1928, completed 2 October 1928.
- MV Brittany, cargo ship for David MacIver & Co, launched 17 May 1928, completed 30 June 1928.
- SS Nyanza, cargo ship for MacLay & MacIntyre Ltd, launched 17 May 1928, completed 4 July 1928.
- MV King William, cargo ship for King Line, launched 19 May 1928, completed 5 July 1928.
- SS Yamanota, oil tanker for Lago Shipping Co, launched 22 May 1928, completed 13 June 1928.
- MV Highland Chieftain, passenger ship for H&W Nelson Ltd, launched 21 June 1928, completed 26 January 1929.
- Centura, lighter for Argentine Navigation Co, launched 26 June 1928, completed 12 July 1928.
- SS Designer, cargo ship for T&J Harrison Ltd, launched 3 July 1928, completed 7 September 1928.
- MV Cuidad de Salto, passenger ship for Argentine Navigation Co, launched 5 July 1928, completed 21 September 1928.
- SS Behar, cargo ship for Hain Steamship Co, launched 16 August 1928, completed 7 November 1928.
- SS Kerma, cargo ship for Strick Line, launched 21 August 1928, completed 20 September 1928.
- MV Highland Brigade, passenger ship for H&W Nelson Ltd, launched 1 November 1928, completed 27 April 1929.
- SS Celtic Monarch, cargo ship for Raeburn & Verel Ltd, launched 15 November 1928, completed 7 January 1929.
- SS Bhutan, cargo ship for Hain Steamship Co, launched 12 December 1928, completed 13 March 1929.
- MV Idomo, lighter for Elder Dempster, launched 21 December 1928, completed 10 January 1929.
- MV Highland Hope, passenger ship for H&W Nelson Ltd, launched 24 January 1929, completed 26 January 1930.
- MV Ulster Monarch, ferry for Belfast Steamship Co, launched 24 January 1929, completed 10 June 1929, scrapped 1966.
- SS Cardiff, cargo ship for Argentine Navigation Co, launched 25 January 1929, completed 7 March 1929.
- SS Glasgow, cargo ship for Argentine Navigation Co, launched 26 February 1929, completed 24 April 1929.
- MV Ulster Queen, ferry for Belfast Steamship Co, launched 28 March 1929, completed 11 February 1930, scrapped 1957.
- MV Highland Princess, passenger ship for H&W Nelson Ltd, launched 11 April 1929, completed 25 February 1930.
- SS Baron Vernon, cargo ship for H Hogarth & Sons, launched 23 April 1929, completed 28 June 1929.
- SS Tamare, oil tanker for Lago Shipping Co, launched 23 April 1929, completed 7 May 1929.
- MV Ulster Prince, ferry for Belfast Steamship Co, launched 25 April 1929, completed 3 March 1930, destroyed in air attack April 1941.
- SS Westralia, refrigerated cargo ship for Huddart Parker, launched 25 April 1929, completed 15 August 1929.
- SS Ule, tanker for Lago Shipping Co, launched 30 April 1929, completed 20 May 1929.
- SS Surinam, oil tanker for Lago Shipping Co, launched 9 May 1929, completed 29 May 1929.
- SS Lochness, (Govan-built), ferry for David MacBrayne & Co, launched 6 June 1929, completed 9 July 1929, renamed Valmarina 1955 and Myrtidiotissa 1958, scrapped 1973.
- SS Irwin, ferry for South India Railways, launched 10 June 1929, completed 2 September 1929.
- SS Baron Ramsey, cargo ship for H Hogarth & Sons, launched 13 June 1929, completed 12 July 1929.
- SS Kavak, cargo ship for Moss Steamship Co, launched 19 June 1929, completed 19 September 1929.
- SS Goschen, ferry for South India Railways, launched 27 June 1929, completed 20 September 1929.
- MV Llangibby Castle, (Govan-built), passenger ship for Union Castle, launched 4 July 1929, completed 21 November 1929, maiden voyage 5 December 1929, scrapped 1954.
- MV Britannic, passenger ship for White Star Line, launched 6 August 1929, completed 21 June 1930, maiden voyage 28 June 1930, scrapped 1960.
- MV Kufra, cargo ship for James Moss & Co, launched 21 August 1929, completed 19 November 1929.
- SS Cuidad de Ascuncion, cargo ship for Argentine Navigation Co, launched 22 August 1929, completed 17 March 1930.
- SS Kana, cargo ship for Moss Steamship Co, launched 22 August 1929, completed 1 November 1929.
- SS Ardanbhan, cargo ship for Clarke & Service Ltd, launched 6 September 1929, completed 7 November 1929.
- MV Amberes, cargo ship for Argentine Navigation Co. launched 24 October 1929, completed 25 March 1930.
- MV David Livingstone, cargo ship for British & African Steamship Co, launched 24 October 1929, completed 20 March 1930.
- SS Dorothy Rose, cargo ship for Richard Hughes & Co, launched 31 October 1929, completed 21 November 1929.
- MV Dunbar Castle, passenger ship for Union Castle, launched 31 October 1929, completed 20 May 1930, mined and sunk 1940.
- MV Carmen Avellaneda, train ferry for Entre Rios Railway Co, launched 1 November 1929, completed 13 December 1929.
- MV Winchester Castle, passenger ship for Union Castle, launched 19 November 1929, completed 11 October 1930, maiden voyage 24 October 1930, scrapped 1960.
- SS Dudley Rose, cargo ship for Richard Hughes & Co, launched 4 December 1929, completed 23 December 1929.
- MS Wanganella, (built as Achimota), passenger ship for Huddart Parker, launched 17 December 1929, completed 29 November 1932, scrapped 1970.
- MV Mary Slessor, cargo ship for British & African Steamship Co, launched 18 December 1929, completed 23 April 1930.
- MV Barcelona, cargo ship for Argentine Navigation Co, launched 19 December 1929, completed 16 April 1930.
- RMMV Oceanic ocean liner for the White Star Line, laid down 28 June 1928, cancelled late 1929.
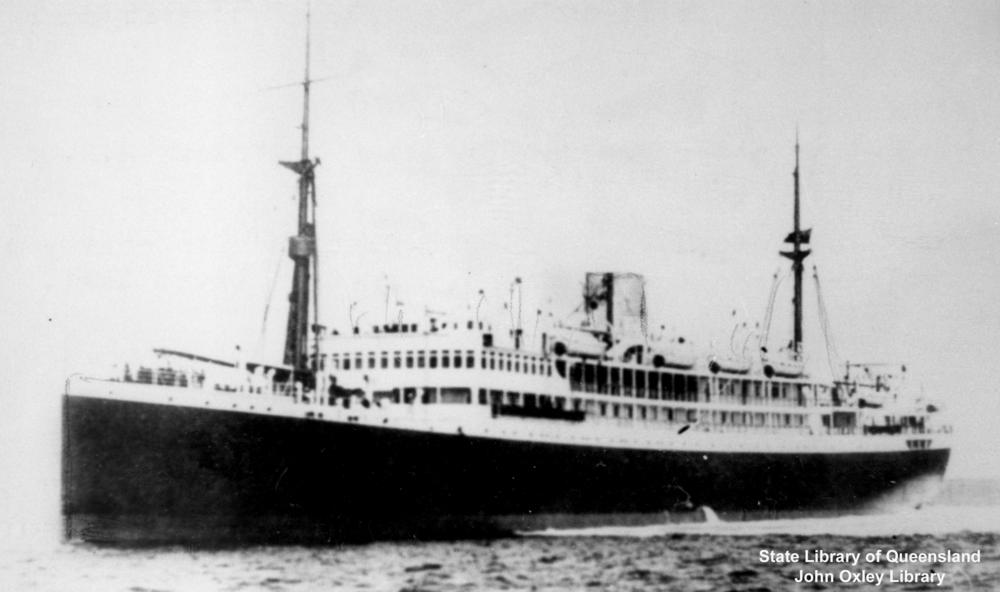
Accra

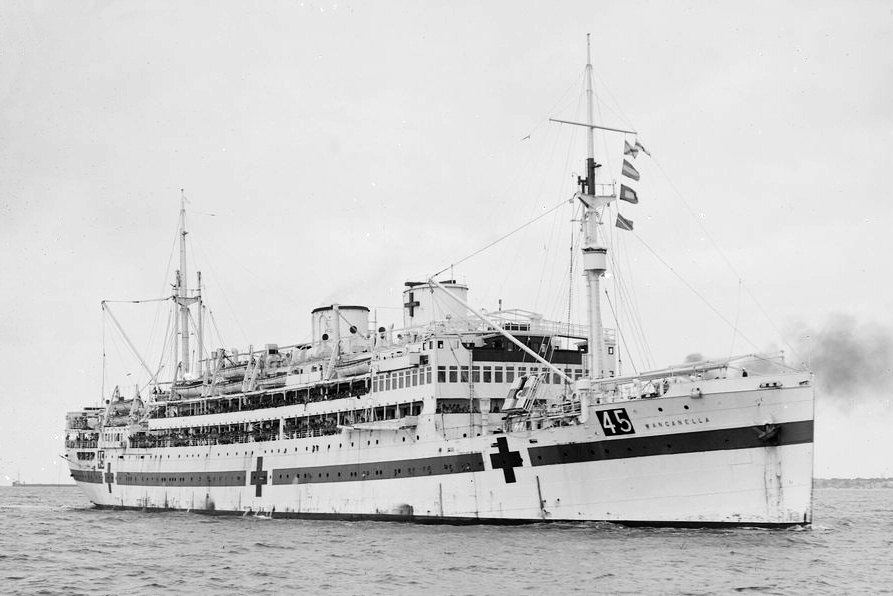
HMHS Wanganella (launched as Achimota)

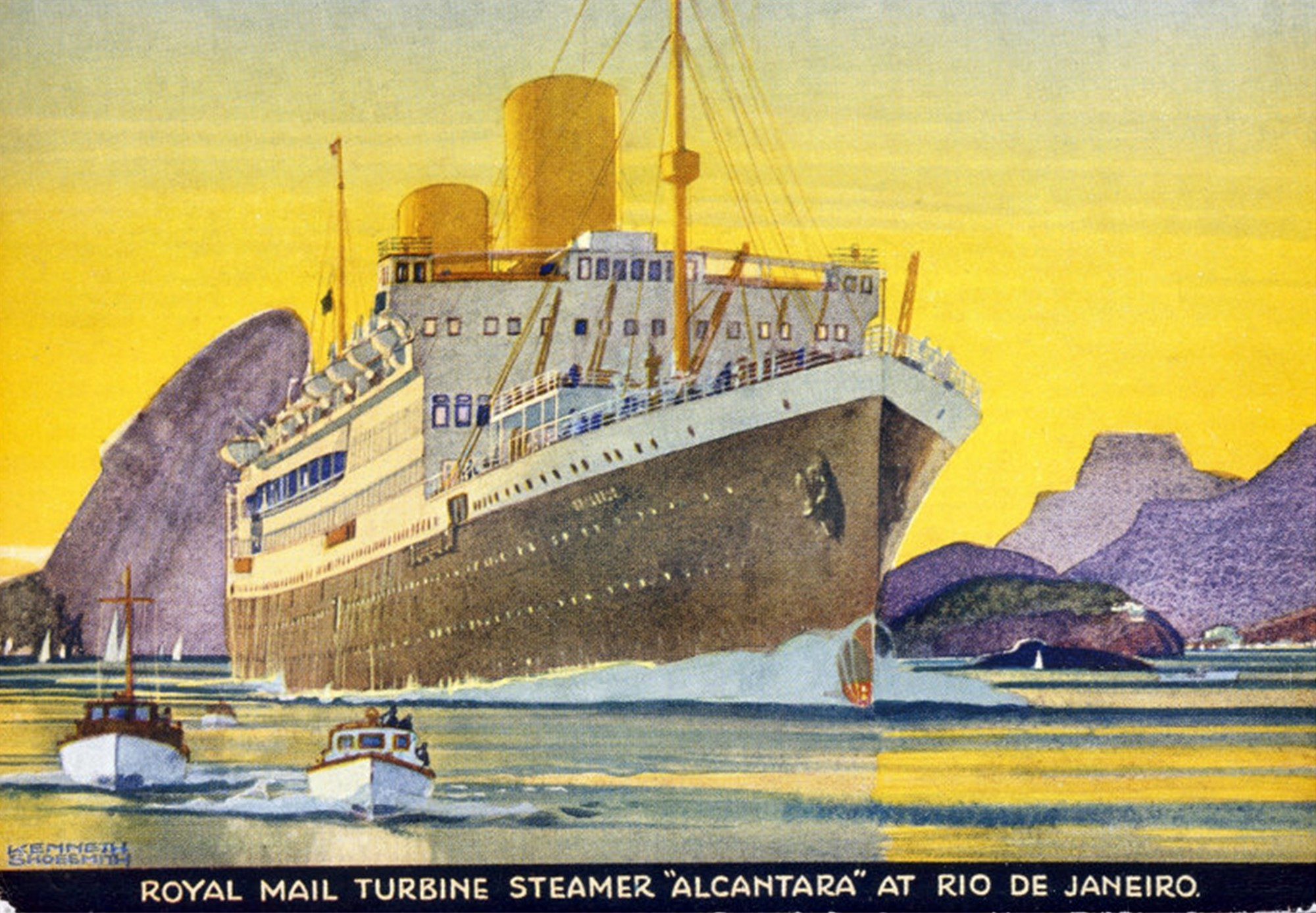
Alcantara

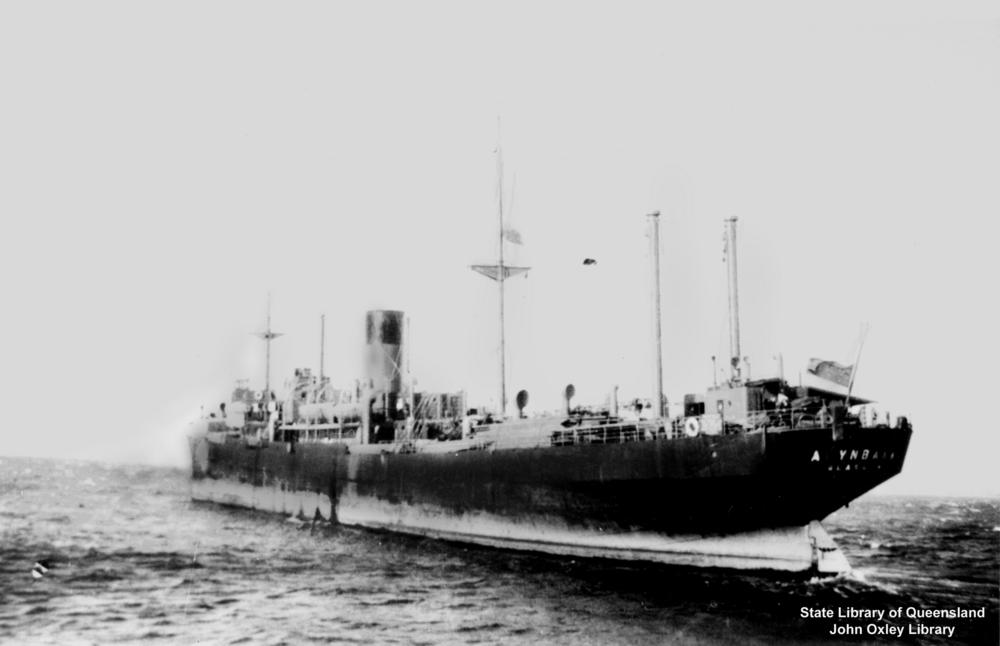
Alynbank

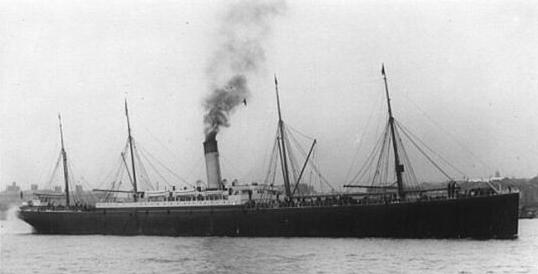
Armenian

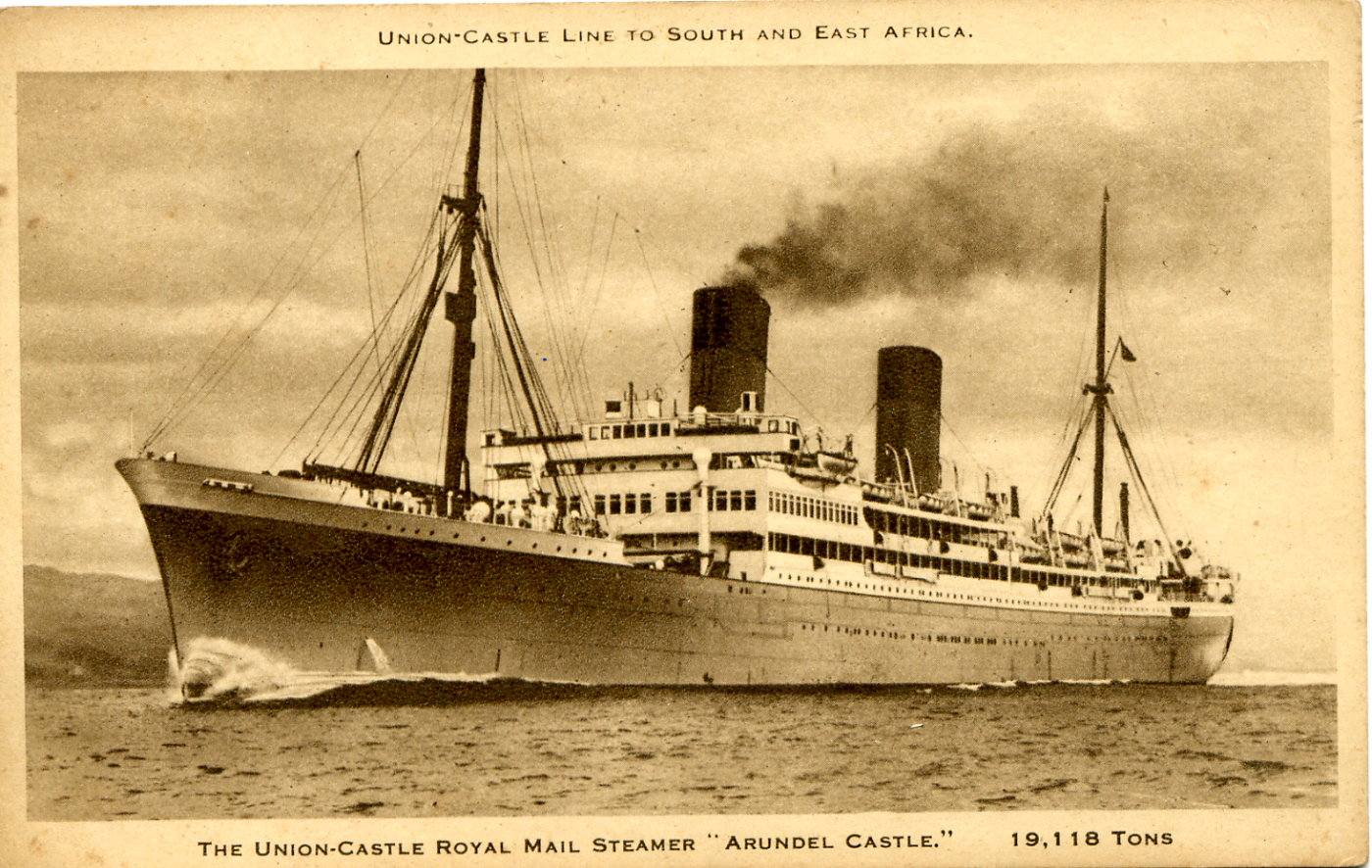
Arundel Castle

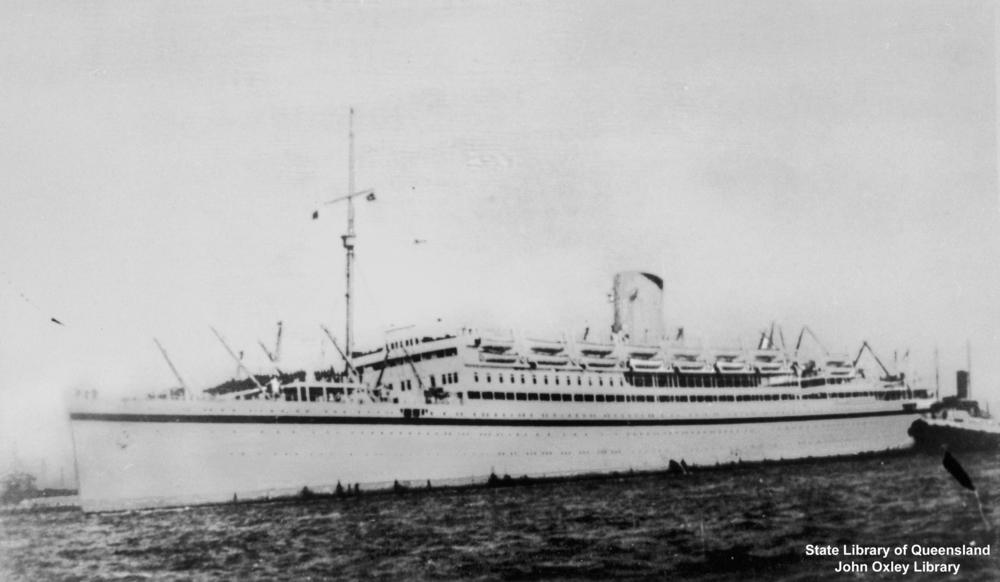
Asturias

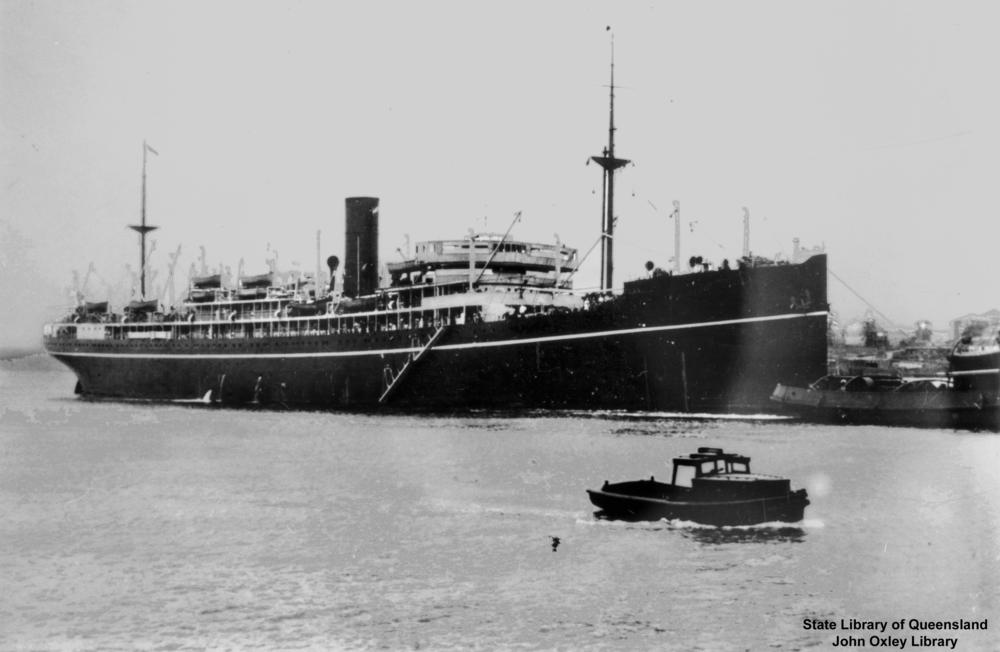
Baradine

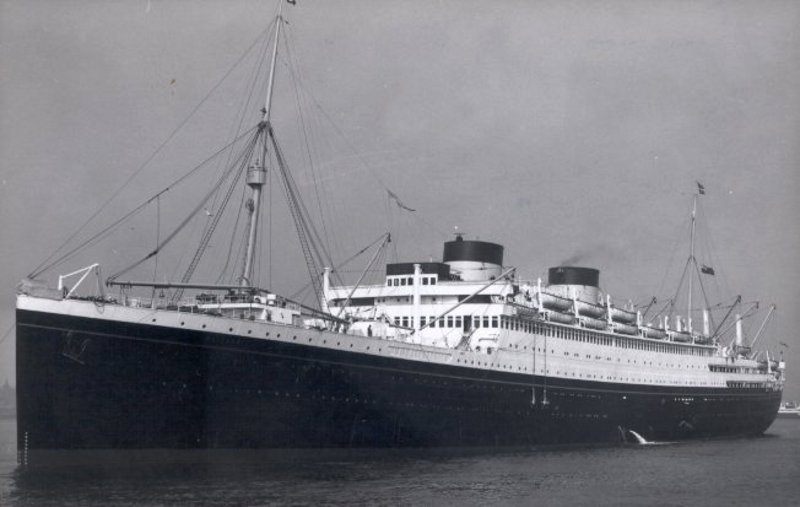
Britannic

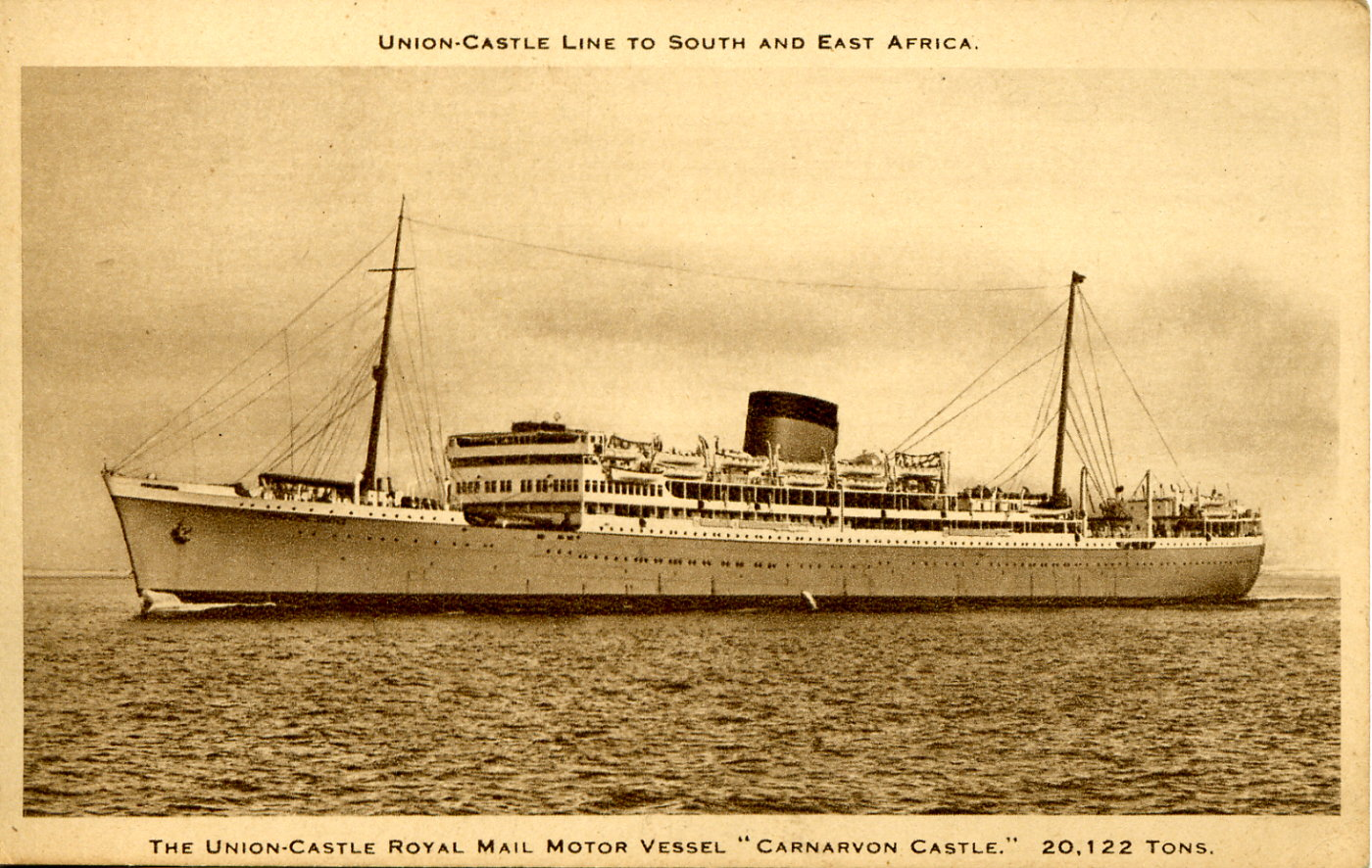
Carnarvon Castle

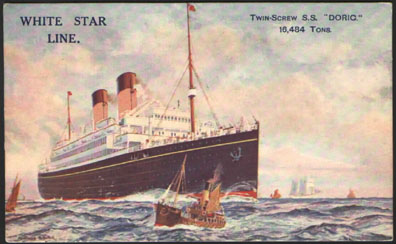
Doric

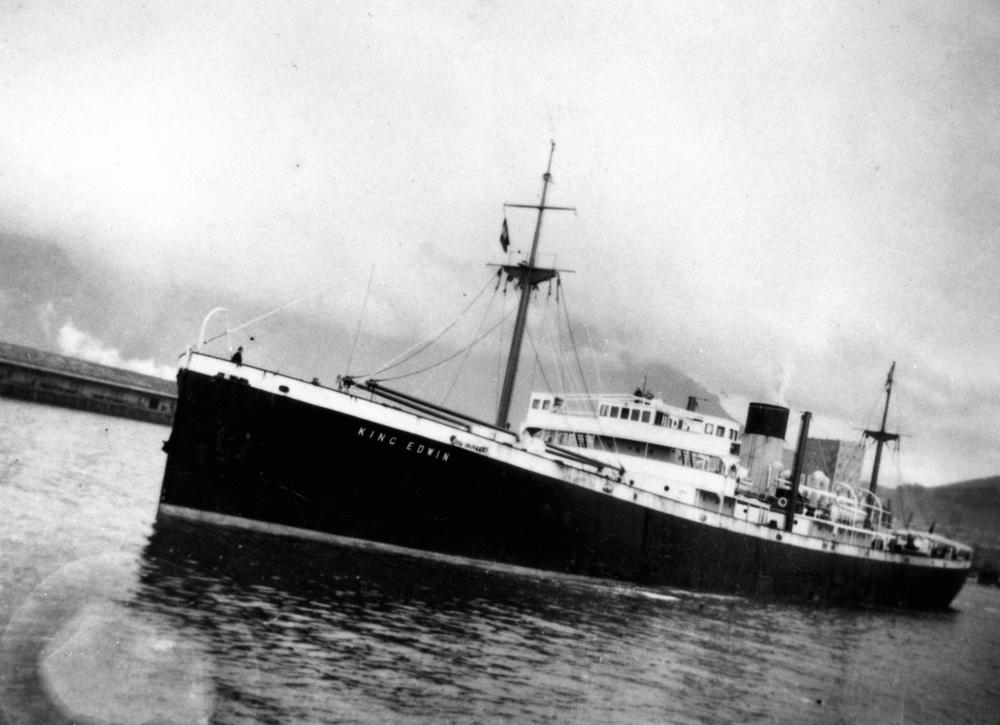
King Edwin

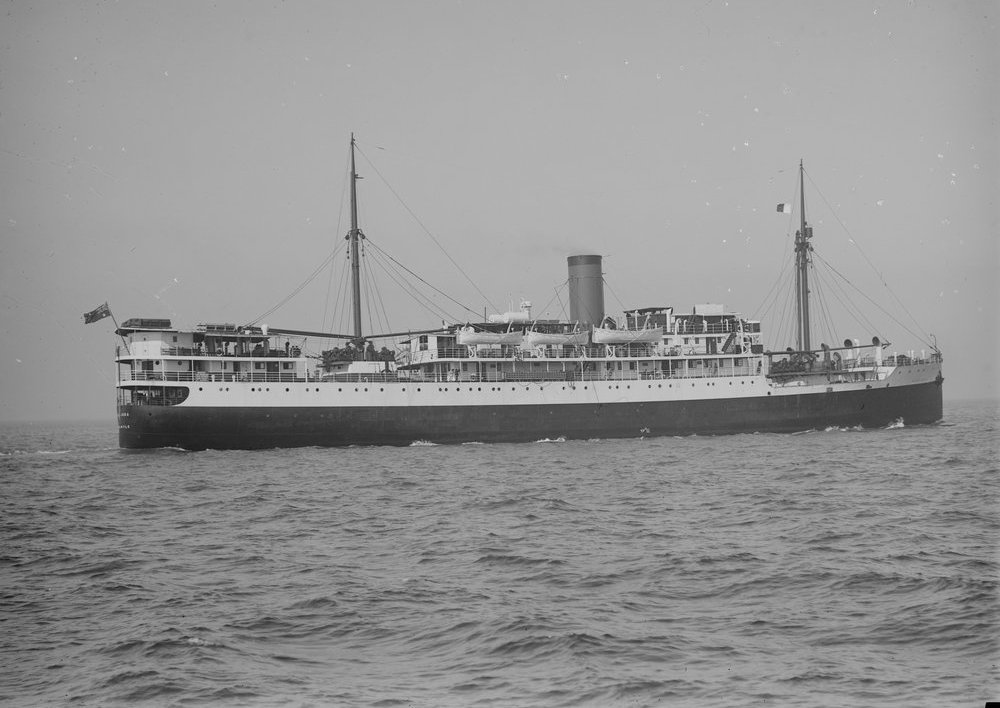
Koolinda

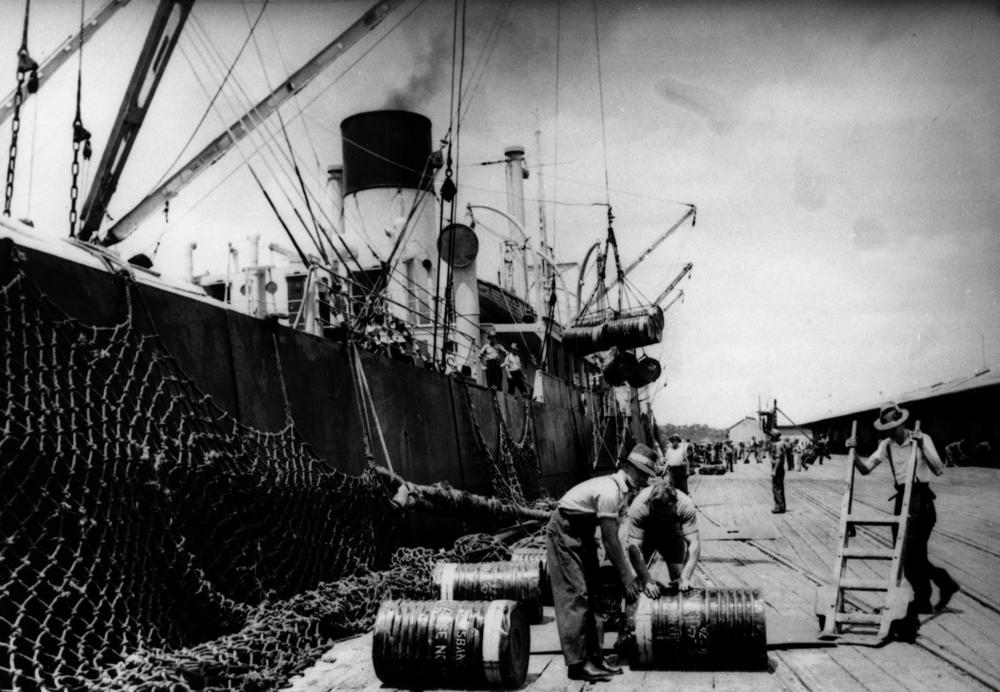
Larchbank

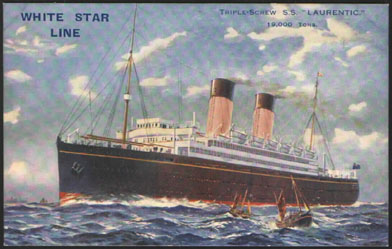
Laurentic

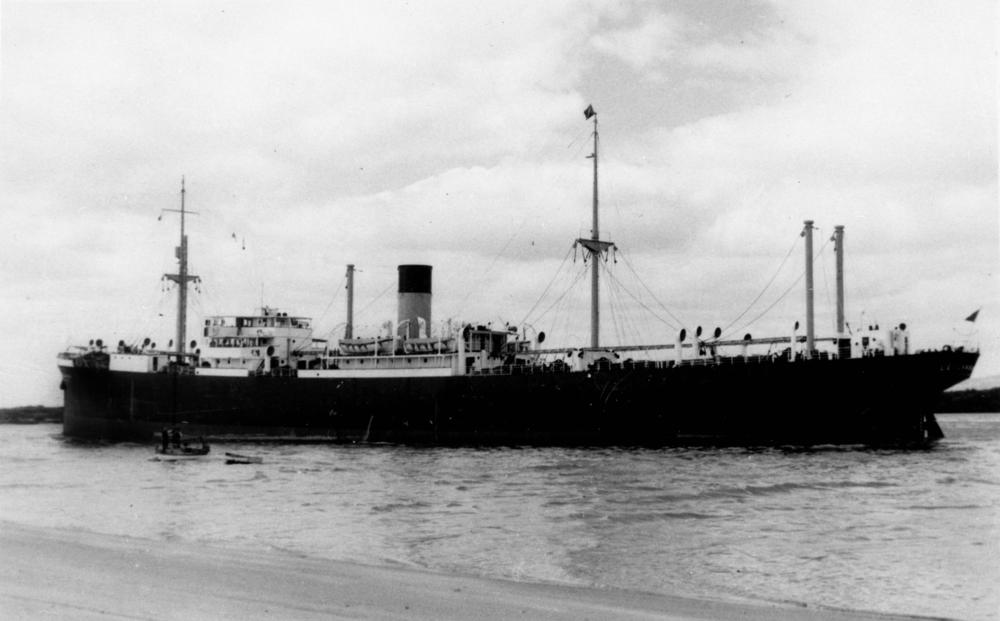
Levernbank

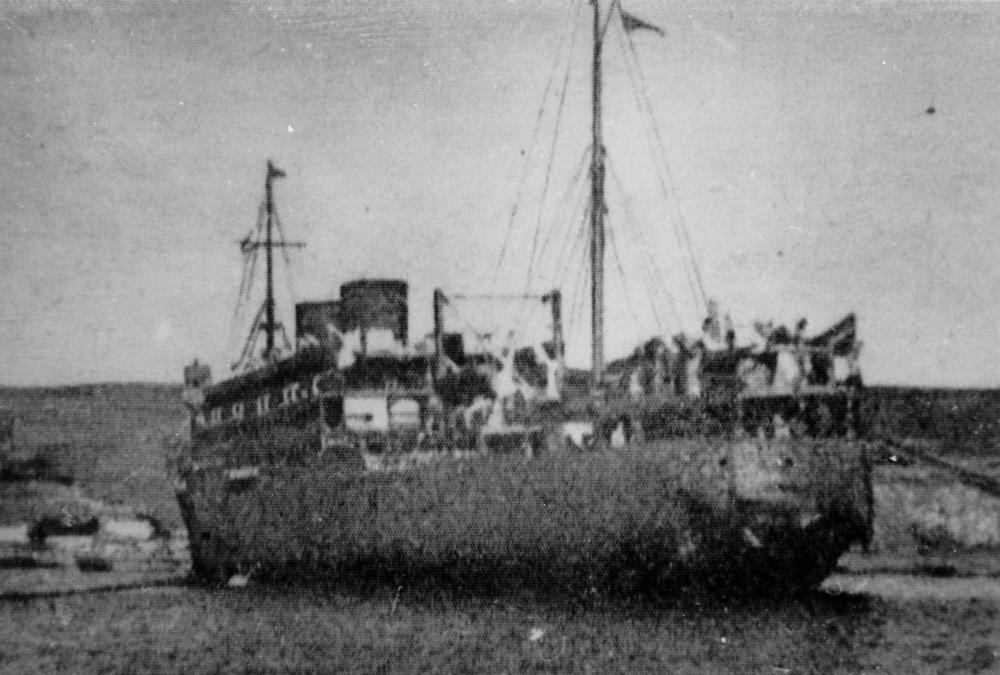
Llangibby Castle

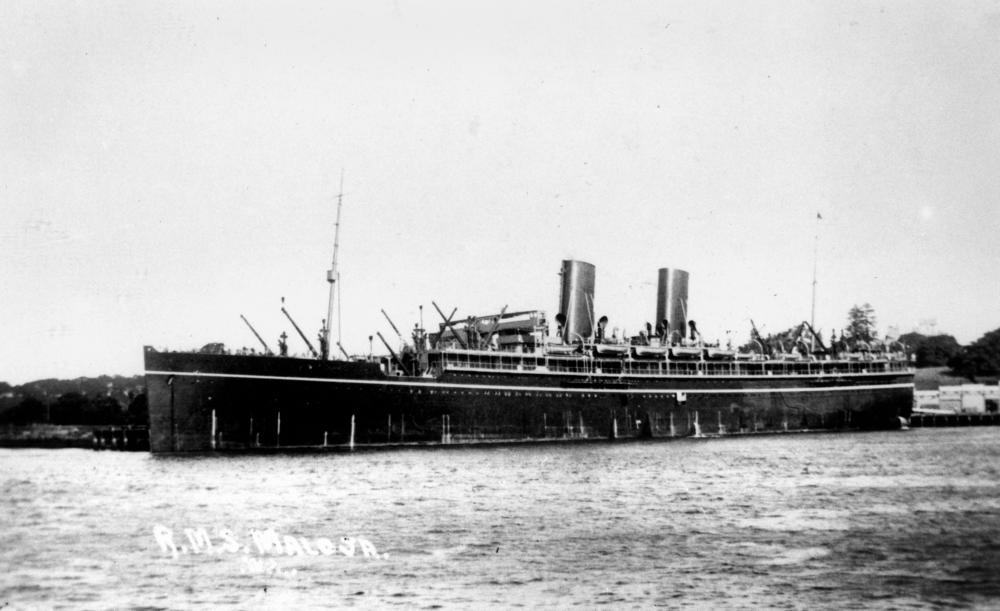
Maloja

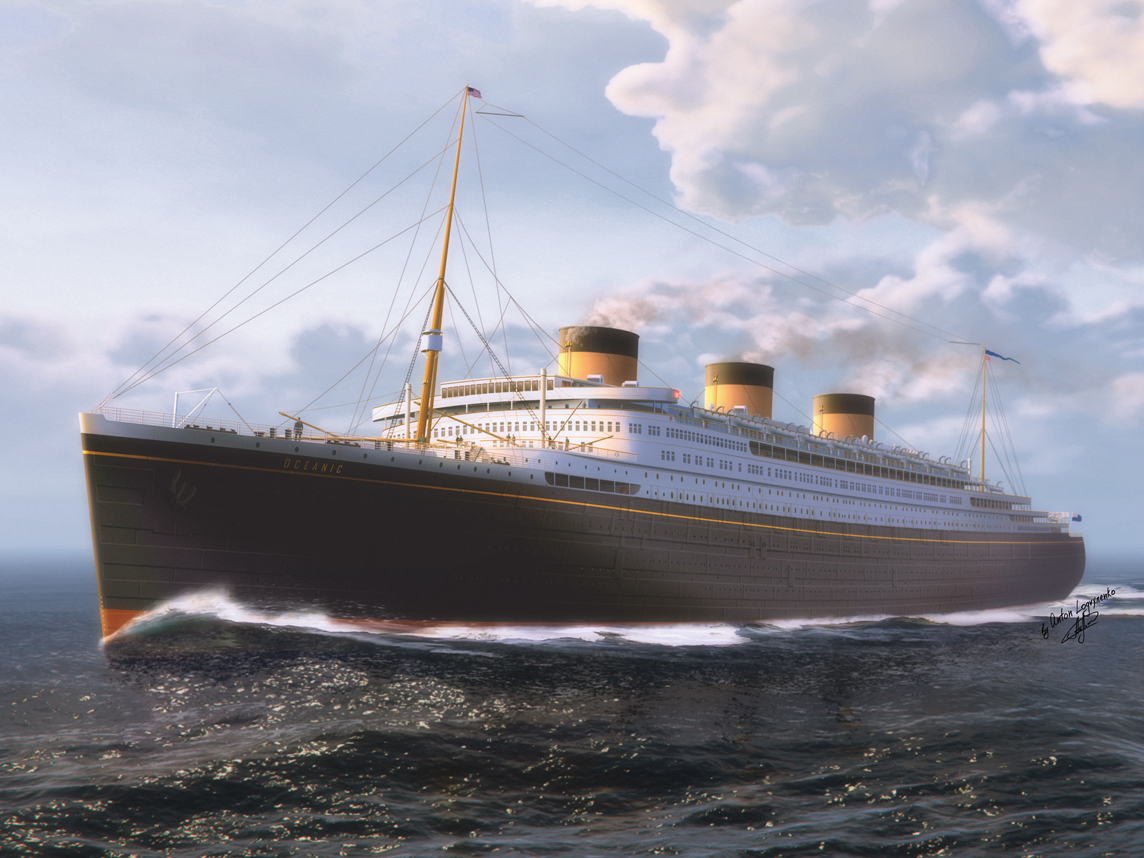
Oceanic (artist's impression)

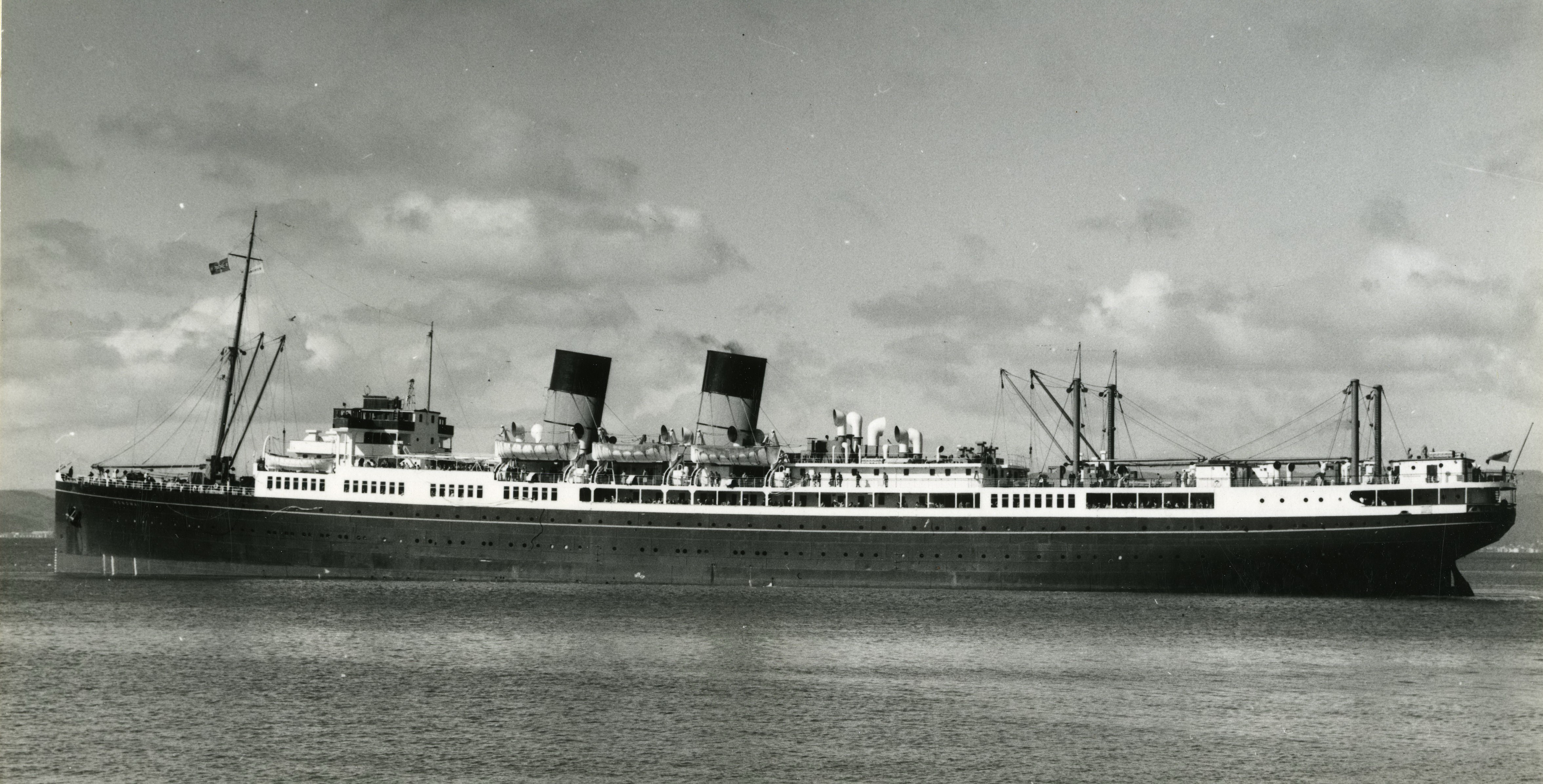
Monowai (launched as Razmak)

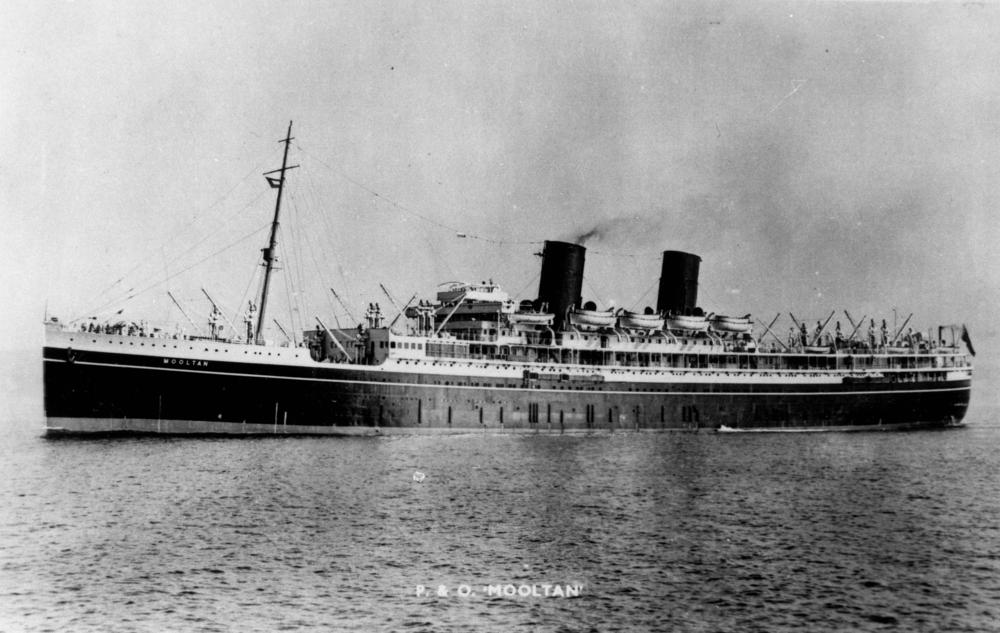
RMS Mooltan

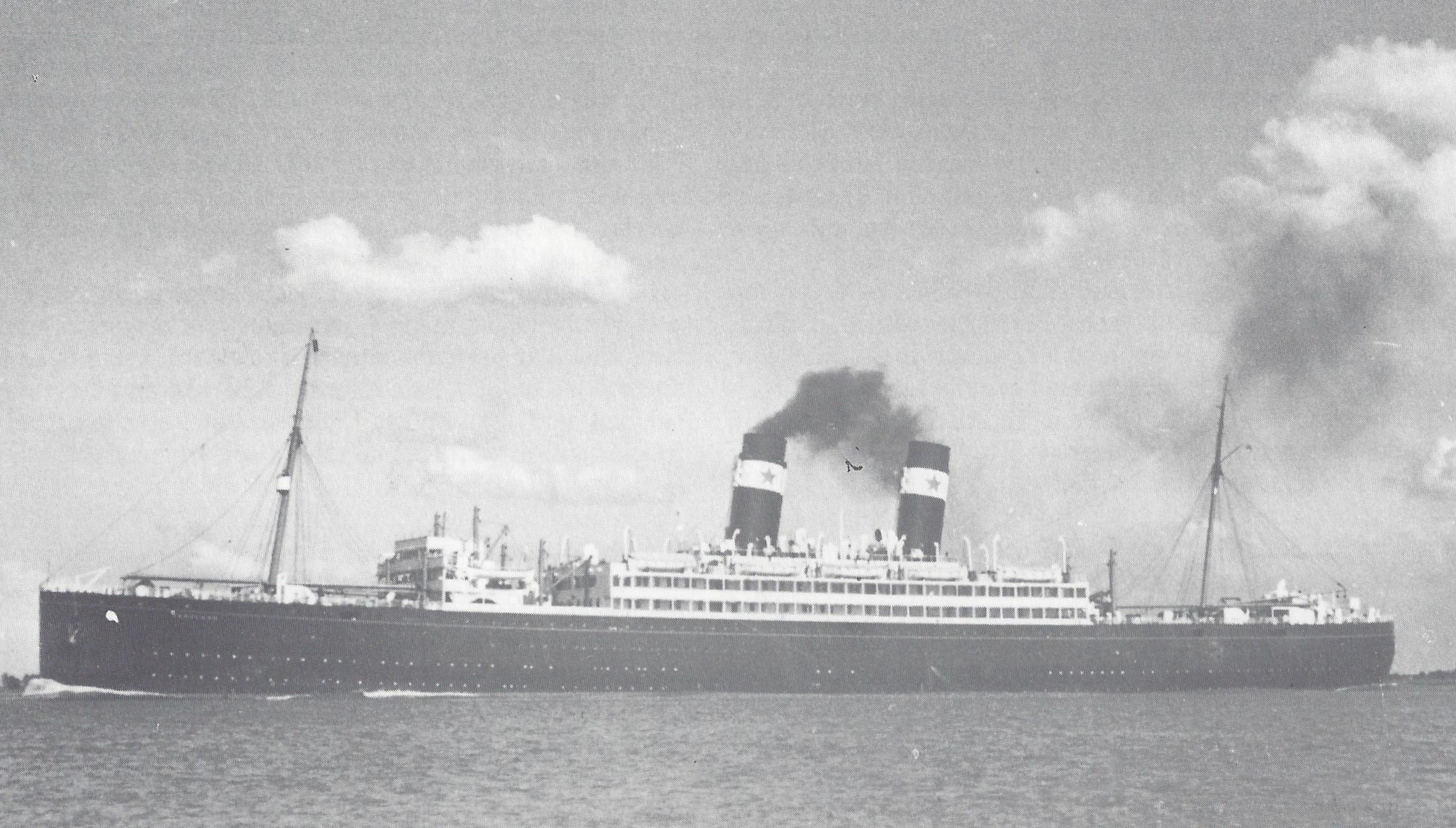
Pennland (launched as Pittsburgh)

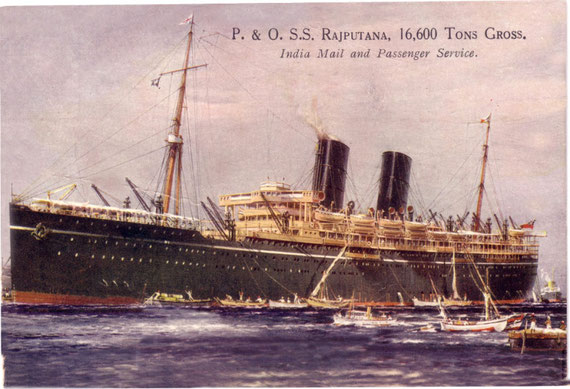
Rajputana

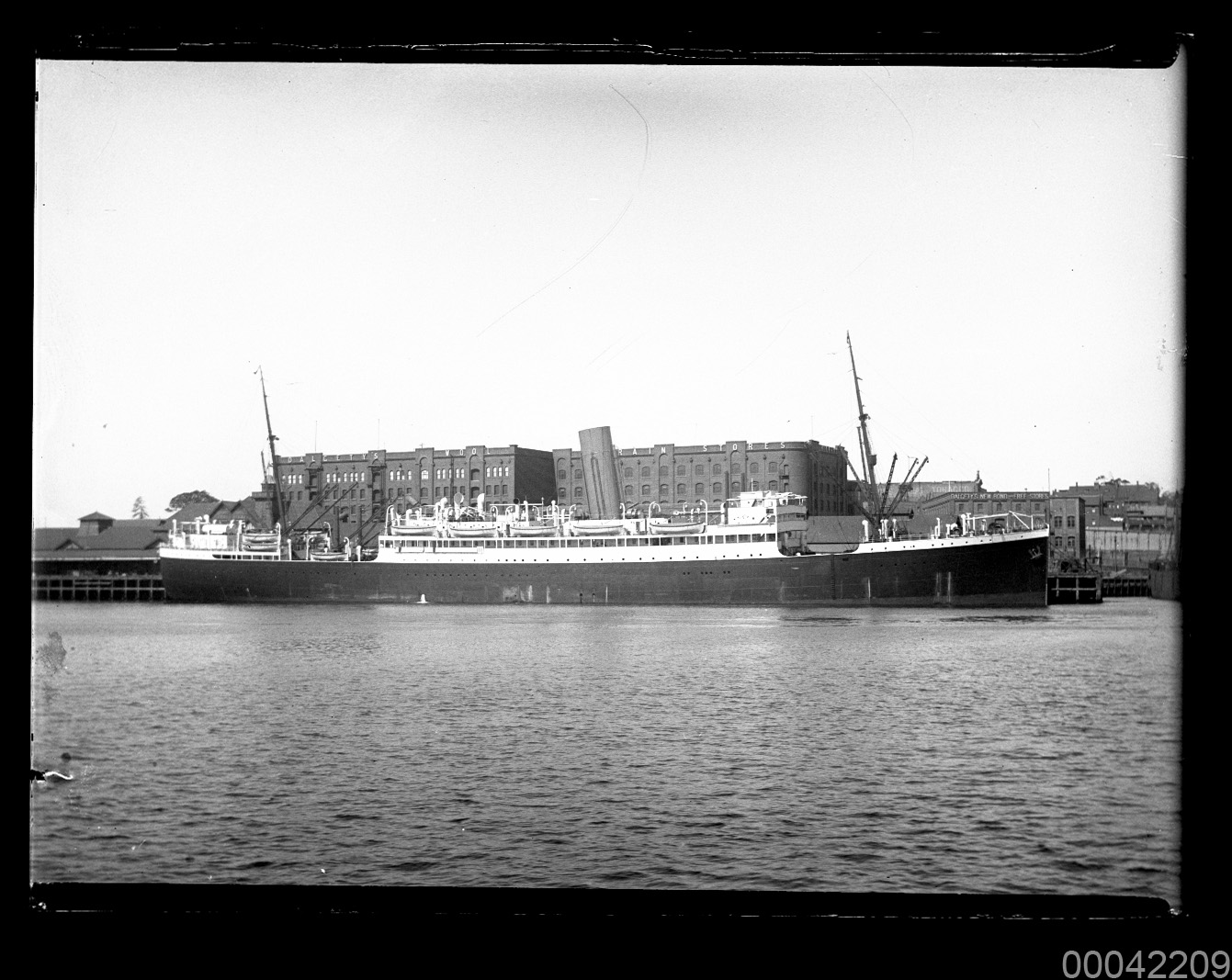
Sophocles

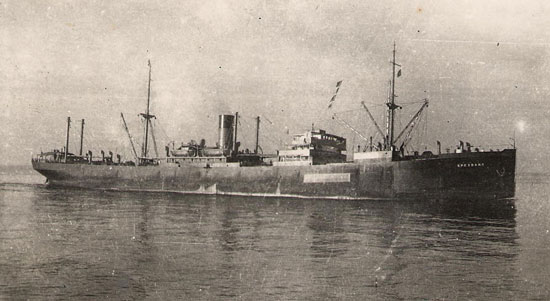
Speybank

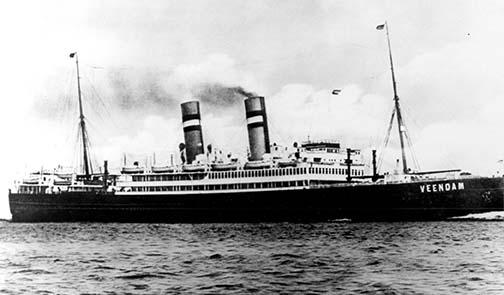
Veendam

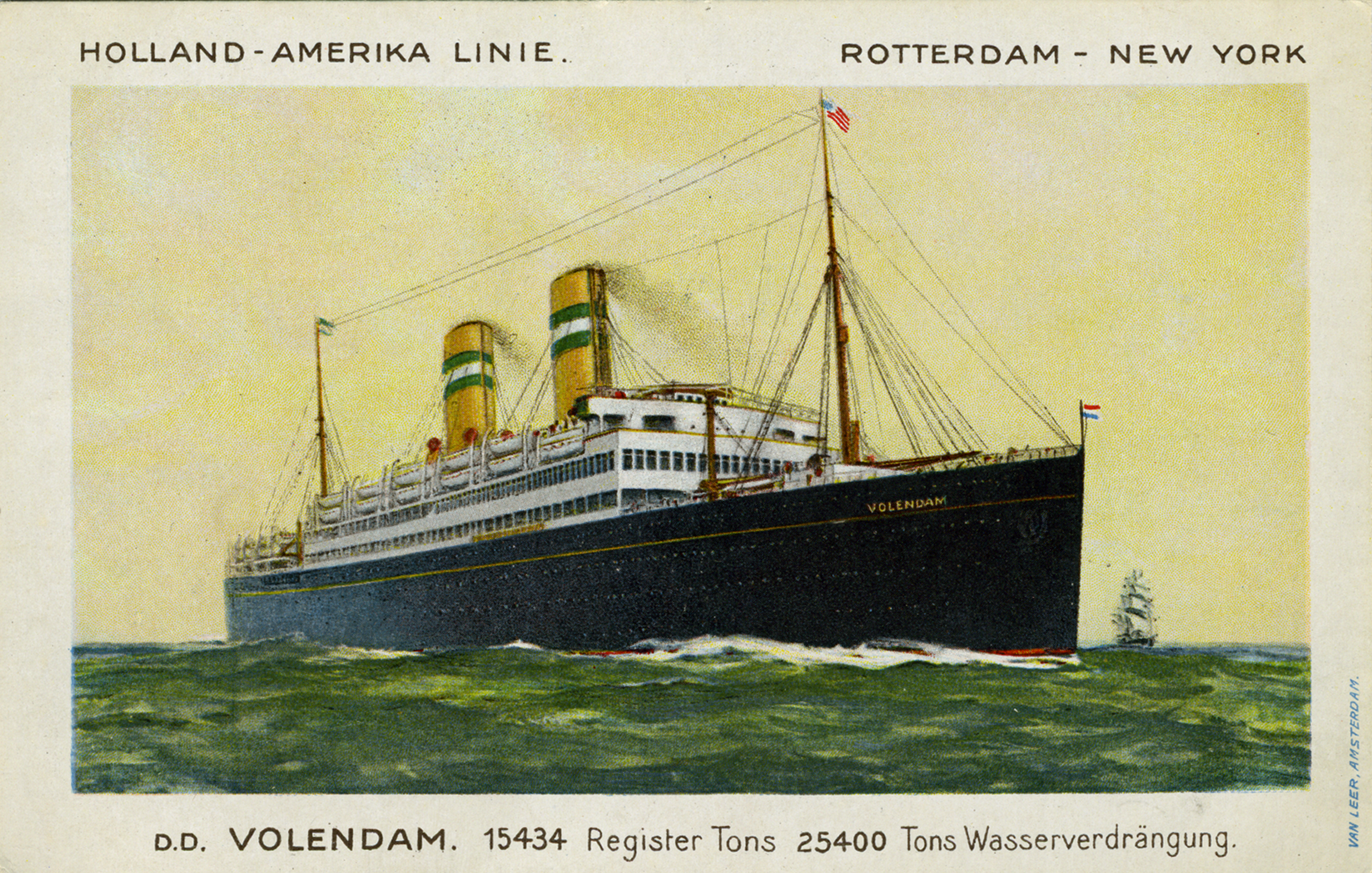
Volendam

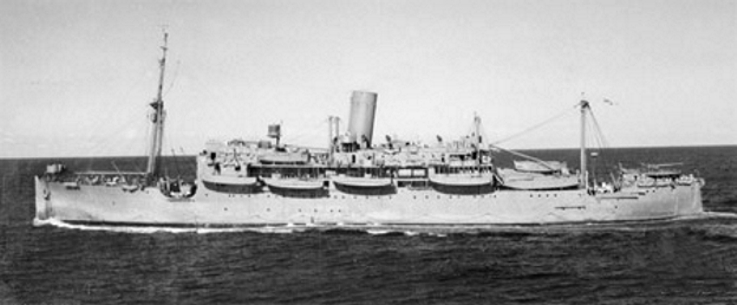
HMAS Westralia

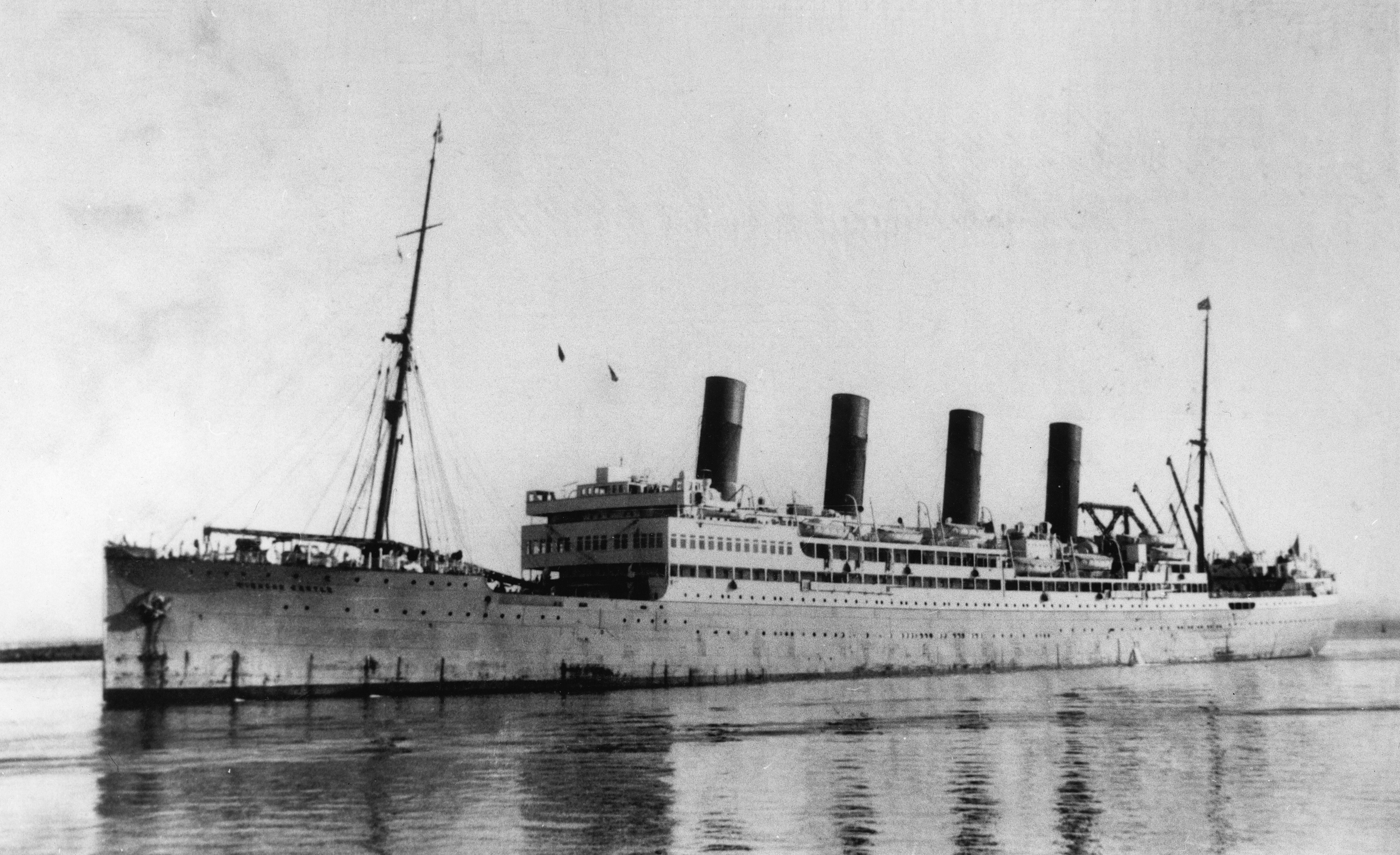
Windsor Castle

== See also ==
- List of ships built by Harland & Wolff (1930-2002)
