= SS Minnewaska (1923) =

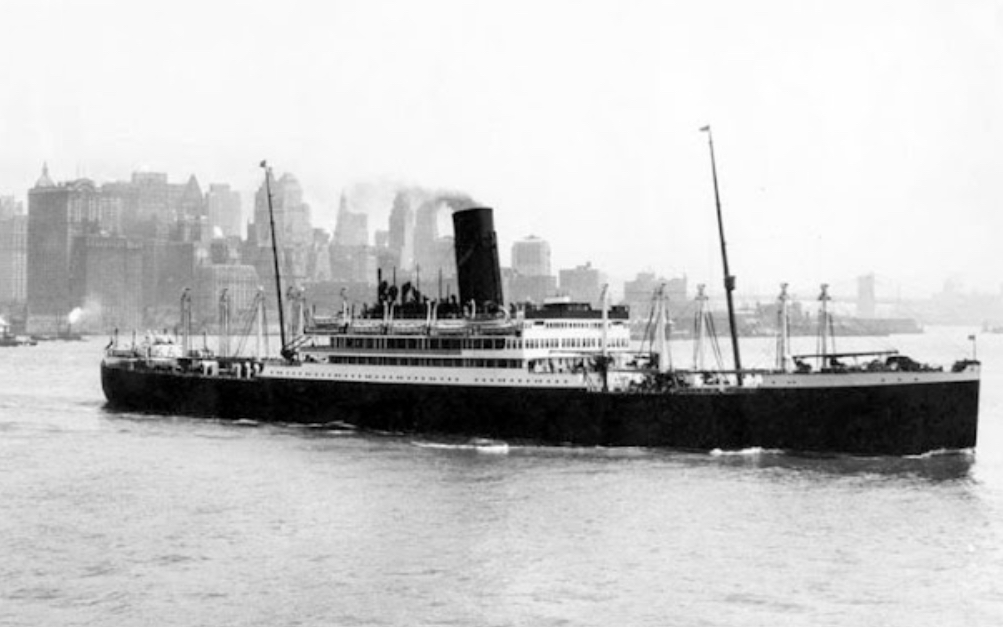
- SS Minnewaska departing New York

History

United Kingdom
- Owner: Atlantic Transport Line
- Route: London–New York City
- Ordered: 1922
- Builder: Harland & Wolff
- Cost: £1,175,000
- Yard number: 613
- Launched: 22 March 1923
- Completed: 25 August 1923
- Maiden voyage: 1 September 1923
- Fate: Sold in 1931
- Owner: Red Star Line
- Route: Antwerp–New York City
- In service: 1932
- Out of service: 1933
- Fate: Scrapped in 1934

General characteristics
- Tonnage: 21,716 gross register tons
- Length: 610 ft (190 m)
- Beam: 80 ft (24 m)
- Depth: 49 ft (15 m)
- Propulsion: Two sets of Brown-Curtis type steam turbines, 15,000 shp, twin screw; 12 water tube boilers, oil fuel, consuming 165 tons per day
- Speed: 16.5 knots (30.6 km/h; 19.0 mph)
- Capacity: 21,716 tons; 369 first-class passengers
- Notes: Black hull with red band, boot-topping red, upper works white, single red funnel with black top

SS Minnewaska was a 21,716-ton ocean liner in the service of the Atlantic Transport Line and the Red Star Line from 1923–1933

She was the fourth ship of the Atlantic Transport Line to carry the name "Minnewaska". The third Minnewaska had been launched in 1908 and sailed the London to New York City route until 1915 when she was requisitioned by the British Army with disastrous consequences. In 1916, she struck a mine in Souda Bay, Crete, in the Mediterranean sea. With 1,800 troops on board and badly damaged, she was beached and written off as a total loss. Her replacement, the fourth SS Minnewaska, in 1923, had accommodation for 369 first class passengers, but was primarily a cargo carrier, the largest afloat at 21,716 tons. She cost the Atlantic Transport Line £1,175,000. SS Minnewaska and her sister ship SS Minnetonka were the largest ships to use London Docks prior to the P.& O. "Strath" ships.

Minnewaska was laid down at the Harland & Wolff Ltd, shipyard, Belfast, Northern Ireland, in 1923 and completed on 25 August 1923. She began her maiden voyage from London to New York on 1 September 1923 under the control of Captain T. F. Gates. In 1924, Captain Gates was transferred to the Minnetonka and the Minnewaska was under the command of Captain F. H. Claret.

In December 1929, Minnewaska was involved in a collision with the White Star Line ship SS Traffic, former tender to the RMS Olympic and RMS Titanic. Two years later, Minnewaska was involved in another collision, with Traffic's running mate SS Nomadic. By 1932, the Atlantic Transport Line's business was severely affected by the Depression and all of its ships were either laid up or disposed of. The Minnewaska was laid up in Southend-on-Sea in 1931, the last ship to carry the Atlantic Transport Line's colours before being sold to the Red Star Line. She made her first Red Star voyage, Antwerp-New York City, on 13 May 1932. By the autumn of 1933, she was no longer needed by Red Star. Her last Atlantic crossing was in September 1933, and she was sold for scrap along with her sister ship Minnetonka to Messrs Douglas & Ramsey, ship-breakers, for £35,000 in 1934. Minnewaska and Minnetonka had been in service barely ten years, among the shortest careers of any major Atlantic liner.

Among the Minnewaska's passengers, were F. Scott Fitzgerald and Zelda Sayre Fitzgerald, who sailed to Europe on this ship in May 1924.
