= SS Traffic =

Traffic was the name of two ships of the White Star Line:

- SS Traffic (1872)
- SS Traffic (1911)
