= SS Gallic =

Two ships of the White Star Line have borne the name SS Gallic, an adjectival reference to France:

- SS Gallic (1894) was a passenger tender, originally SS Birkenhead launched in 1894. She was acquired by White Star Line in 1907 and was scrapped in 1913.
- SS Gallic (1918) was a cargo ship, originally SS War Argus launched in 1918. She was acquired by White Star Line in 1919 and was sold to the Clan Line in 1933 and renamed Clan Colquhoun.
