= SS Gallic (1894) =

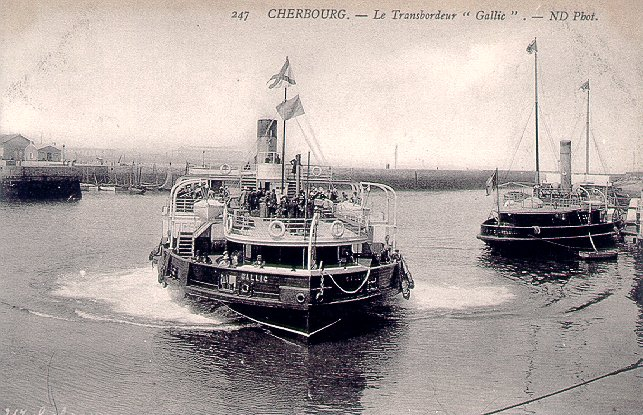
- Gallic

History

United Kingdom
- Name: 1894: Birkenhead; 1907: Gallic
- Owner: 1894: Birkenhead Corporation; 1907: Oceanic Steam Navigation Co
- Operator: 1907: White Star Line
- Port of registry: Liverpool
- Builder: John Scott & Co, Kinghorn
- Yard number: 87
- Laid down: 1894
- Launched: 7 June 1894
- Completed: June 1894
- Out of service: 1914
- Identification: UK official number 102164
- Fate: Scrapped 1914
- Notes: Only paddle steamer operated by White Star Line

General characteristics
- Tonnage: 461 GRT, 185 NRT
- Length: 150.0 ft (45.7 m)
- Beam: 28.2 ft (8.6 m)
- Depth: 10.2 ft (3.1 m)
- Decks: 1
- Installed power: 177 NHP
- Propulsion: 2 × paddle wheels; 2 × 4-cylinder compound engines
- Speed: 13 knots (24 km/h; 15 mph)
- Capacity: 1,200 passengers and mail

SS Gallic was a paddle steamer that built in Scotland 1894 as Birkenhead, renamed Gallic in 1907 and scrapped in Liverpool in 1914. She was designed and built as a Mersey Ferry for Birkenhead Corporation. White Star Line bought her in 1907 to use as a passenger tender, and renamed her Gallic.

John Scott & Co built Birkenhead at its Abden shipyard in Kinghorn in Fife as yard number 87. She was launched on 7 June 1894 and completed that same month. Her registered length was 150.0 ft (45.7 m), her beam was 28.2 ft (8.6 m) and her depth was 10.2 ft (3.1 m). Her tonnages were 461 GRT and 185 NRT.

Birkenhead was a side-wheel paddle steamer. Each wheel was driven by a four-cylinder diagonal compound steam engine. Between them her two engines were rated at a total of 177 NHP and gave her a speed of 13 knots (24 km/h).

Birkenhead Council registered Birkenhead at Liverpool. Her United Kingdom official number was 102164.

White Star Line based Gallic at Cherbourg. She was soon considered too small for tending the company's increasingly large ocean liners. When J. Bruce Ismay proposed the Olympic-class ocean liners, the company ordered two new tenders: SS Nomadic (for first- and second-class passengers) and the SS Traffic (for third-class passengers and mail). Gallic was retained for a short time at Cherbourg, where she was occasionally used as a baggage vessel. The success of Nomadic and Traffic obviated the need for Gallic and she was scrapped at Garston, Liverpool in the summer of 1914 after a short period of being laid up.
