= Traffic control (disambiguation) =

Traffic control is a branch of logistics.

Traffic control or traffic controller or traffic management or traffic manager may also refer to:

- Road traffic control, directing vehicles and pedestrians around a construction zone etc
- Traffic guard or traffic controller, a person who directs road traffic through a temporary traffic control zone
- Traffic lights or traffic control signals, signalling devices control flows of road traffic
  - Traffic light control and coordination
- Bandwidth management, measurement and control of communications traffic
  - Network traffic control, in computer networking
- Air traffic management, systems that assist aircraft to depart and land and transit airspace
- Air traffic control, a service provided by ground-based air traffic controllers to aircraft
- Train dispatcher or rail traffic controller, a person directing the movement of trains
- Sea traffic management, systems that assist ships and ports for tracking maritime traffic
- "Traffic Control", a 2019 song by Giriboy
- tc (Linux), a Linux utility for network traffic control

== See also ==
- Traffic (disambiguation)
- Active traffic management
