= Trafficker (disambiguation) =

A trafficker is a smuggler.

Trafficker may also refer to:

- Drug trafficker
- Human trafficker
- Sex trafficker
- Traffickers, 2012 South Korean film
- The Traffickers (TV series), a 2016 investigative series
- The Traffickers, a book in W. E. B. Griffin's Badge of Honor novel series

== See also ==
- Traffic (disambiguation)
