= SS Minnekahda =

Transatlantic liner

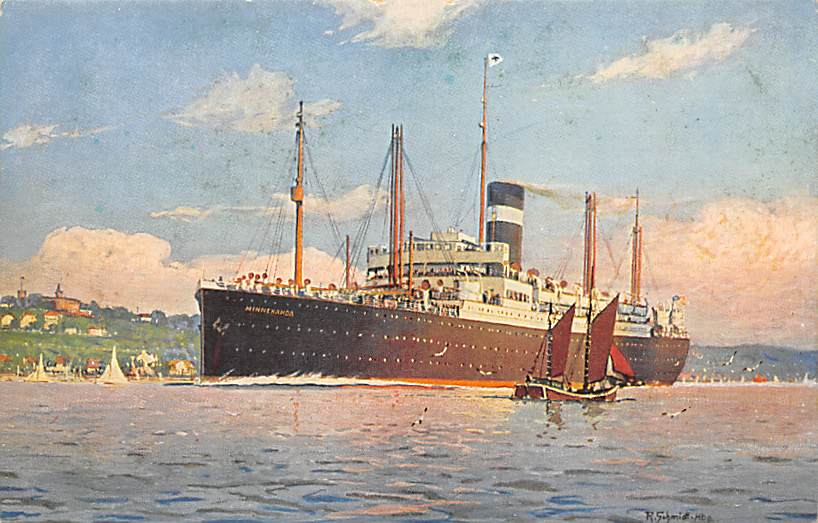
- Postcard by R Schmidt of Minnekahda when American Line chartered her in 1921.

History
- Name: Minnekahda
- Owner: 1918: Atlantic Transport Co, Ltd; 1921: International Mercantile Marine Co; 1922: Atlantic Transport Co of West Virginia
- Port of registry: 1918: (United Kingdom of Great Britain and Ireland) Belfast; 1920: (United States) New York
- Route: 1920: London – New York; 1921–25: New York – Hamburg; 1925–31: New York – London
- Ordered: April 1913
- Builder: Harland & Wolff, Belfast
- Yard number: 446
- Laid down: 1914
- Launched: 8 March 1917
- Completed: 21 March 1918
- Refit: 1921, 1926
- Identification: 1918: UK official number 136369; code letters JSLH; 1921: US official number 220814; code letters MBVP; 1934: call sign KDKK
- Fate: Scrapped 1936

General characteristics
- Type: Ocean liner
- Tonnage: 1917: 17,221 GRT, 10,844 NRT; 1921: 17,281 GRT, 10,208 NRT
- Length: 620.5 ft (189.1 m)
- Beam: 66.4 ft (20.2 m)
- Depth: 47.3 ft (14.4 m)
- Decks: 4
- Installed power: 1,831 NHP, 13,600 ihp
- Propulsion: 3 × screws; 2 × triple expansion engines; 1 × low-pressure steam turbine
- Speed: 15 1/2 knots (28.7 km/h)
- Capacity: 16,000 tons of cargo, including 49,580 cubic feet (1,404 m^{3}) refrigerated; 1921: 2,150 3rd class passengers; 1925: 750 tourist class passengers
- Troops: 3,010
- Sensors & processing systems: submarine signalling; by 1930: wireless direction finding

SS Minnekahda was a transatlantic ocean liner that was launched in Ireland in 1917 and scrapped in Scotland in 1936. She was laid down in 1914 but the First World War delayed her completion. Because of the war she was completed in 1918 as a troop ship, and then worked as a cargo ship.

Minnekahda was not fitted out as a civilian passenger liner until 1921. She was refitted in 1926 to carry fewer passengers in more comfort. From 1931 she was laid up in New Jersey.

Minnekahda was in the fleet of the Atlantic Transport Line, which was part of the International Mercantile Marine Company. She was registered in the United Kingdom until 1920, and then in the United States.

== Building ==
Harland & Wolff built Minnekahda in Belfast on slipway number 6 as yard number 446. She was laid down in 1914, but work on her was suspended after the First World War broke out that August. As the Central Powers' U-boat campaign depleted Allied shipping, the need for replacement ships increased, and Harland & Wolff resumed work on Minnekahda. She was launched on 8 March 1917 and completed as a troop ship on 21 March 1918.

Minnekahda's registered length was 620.5 ft (189.1 m), her beam was 66.4 ft (20.2 m) and her depth was 47.3 ft (14.4 m). Her holds could carry 16,000 tons of cargo, including 49,580 cubic feet (1,404 m^{3}) of refrigerated space. As built, her tonnages were 17,221 GRT and 10,844 NRT.

Minnekahda was one of a series of Harland & Wolff steamships that were propelled by a combination of reciprocating steam engines and a steam turbine. She had three screws. A pair of four-cylinder triple expansion engines drove her port and starboard screws. Exhaust steam from those engines powered one low-pressure turbine that drove her middle screw.

Harland & Wolff had used this arrangement first on Laurentic (1908) for White Star Line, and most notably on the three Olympic-class ocean liners. Between them, Minnekahda's three engines were rated at a total of 1,831 NHP or 13,600 ihp and gave her a speed of 15 1/2 or 16 knots (28.7 or 29.6 km/h).

Atlantic Transport Line registered Minnekahda at Belfast. Her UK official number was 136369 and her code letters were JSLH.

== British troop and cargo ship ==
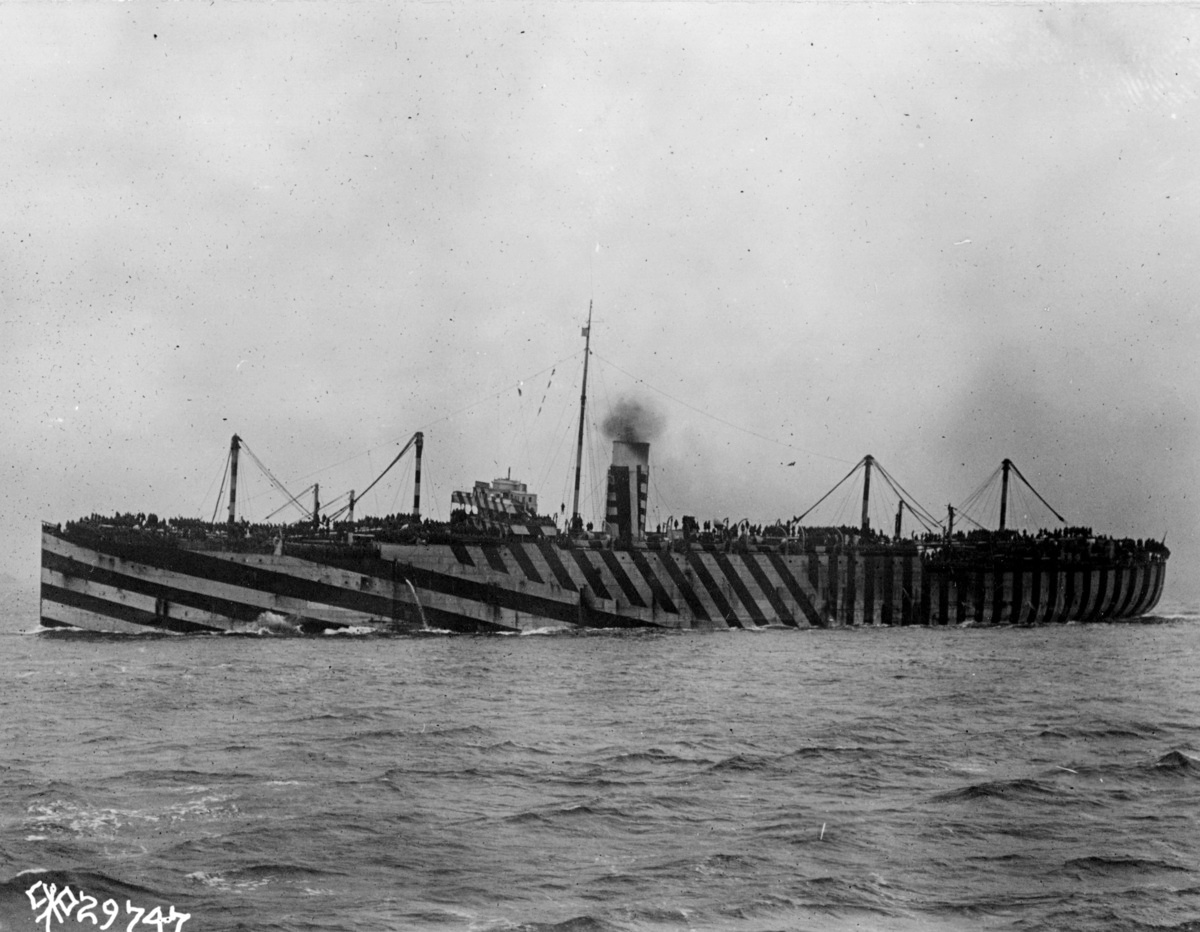
Minnekahda in dazzle camouflage, approaching New York on 4 December 1918 with 3,010 U.S. troops aboard

Minnekahda served as an armed troop transport during World War I, engaged in carrying troops from the United States to Europe. In July 1918, she was involved in a friendly fire incident. She departed New York City on 21 July 1918 with 3,800 U. S. troops aboard as one of a convoy of five troop transports. In the predawn hours of 23 July, the United States Navy submarine USS N-3 was on the surface in the Atlantic Ocean, charging her batteries in calm, hazy weather with bright moonlight, when she suddenly sighted one of the ships of the convoy at 02:55 at a range of only 1,800 yards (1,650 m). Minnekahda soon also appeared, headed straight at N-3 and only about 200 yards (183 m) away. N-3 immediately made a preliminary recognition signal by firing a green flare, then sent a recognition signal by blinker light. Minnekahda did not respond except to blow her steam whistle. N-3′s crew heard someone aboard Minnekahda order "Fire!" As N-3 continued to flash the recognition signal by blinker light, N-3′s commanding officer hailed Minnekahda, calling out "Don't fire, this is an American submarine!" At that instant, one of Minnekahda′s guns fired a 6-or-7.5-inch (152 or 191 mm) round (according to different sources), and the shell hit N-3 forward at the waterline, failing to explode but inflicting considerable damage and causing leaks. Minnekahda closed to a range of 50 yards (46 m), close enough for N-3′s crew to see men aboard Minnekahda and hear them receive an order to load. As N-3 continued to flash the recognition signal, several men on N3′s deck yelled "Don't fire!" and "Don't shoot, this is the N-3!" Finally, someone on Minnekahda asked where N-3′s flag was. N-3′s crew immediately brought a United States flag on deck and shined a light on it. Minnekahda promptly ceased fire. The U.S. Navy destroyer USS Preble, serving as one of the convoy's escorts, approached at flank speed as if to ram N-3, and N-3 made recognition signals and backed at full speed, avoiding a collision with Preble by only a few feet. N-3 hailed Preble, which stopped and sent a boat to N-3 to assess her damage. N-3 had suffered no crew casualties, but Minnekahda′s unexploded shell was found in N-3′s forward superstructure, and N-3′s torpedo compartment was partially flooded. After pumping 2,800 US gallons (2,331 imp gal; 10,599 L) of diesel fuel overboard to lighten herself forward, N-3 proceeded to port on the surface under her own power.

Minnekahda repatriated Allied troops after the armistice with Germany that ended World War I on 11 November 1918. On 23 November 1918 she left Liverpool taking home 3,010 members of the American Expeditionary Forces. She sailed in convoy with two other British troop ships, Lapland and Orca, and an escort of destroyers. On the voyage one U.S. soldier aboard Minnekahda died of pneumonia, which he caught as a secondary infection after contracting the Spanish flu. Atlantic storms slowed the convoy by 36 hours, and Lapland and Minnekahda reached New York on 5 December 1918.

In February 1919 Minnekahda repatriated 12 companies of the United States Army′s 329th Infantry Regiment. On 16 January 1920 she left London on her final trooping voyage, crossing the Atlantic via Halifax, Nova Scotia, Canada, to New York City.

On 27 March 1920 Minnekahda started service between London and New York as a cargo ship. Her cargo included 17 tons of gold bullion, worth $9,800,000, in her specie room. The bullion was from HM Treasury, as an instalment repayment of war loans. When she docked in New York on 7 April, motor trucks under armed guard met her to take the bullion to the Federal Reserve Bank of New York.

American Line chartered Minnekadha for a single round trip from New York to London and Hamburg and back to New York that began on 17 July 1920. She began her last voyage as a cargo ship on 8 October 1920, leaving London for New York.

== Immigrant liner ==
On 3 November 1920 Atlantic Transport Line changed Minnekahda's port of registration to New York. Her US official number was 220814 and her code letters were MBVP.

Bethlehem Steel at Fore River Shipyard in Quincy, Massachusetts refitted the ship at a cost of $700,000 to carry civilian passengers. She was a one-class ship, with cabins of two, four or six berths. Public rooms included a lounge and a smoking room. The New York Times reported her total capacity as 2,500 passengers, but other sources give the total as 2,150. Her tonnages were revised to 17,281 GRT and 10,208 NRT.

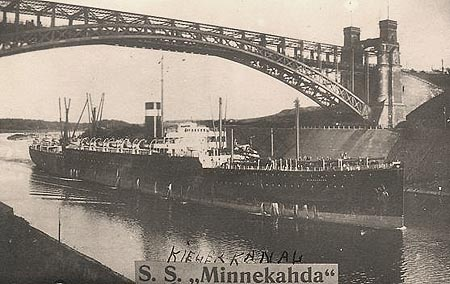
Minnekahda in American Line colors, passing under the Levensau High Bridge on the Kiel Canal, probably in 1921.

Minnekahda's first voyage as a passenger liner was another charter to American Line for a single round trip. She left New York on 31 March 1921, called at Naples and Hamburg, and returned to New York. On 21 May that year she entered regular Atlantic Transport Line service between New York and Hamburg.

When Minnekahda docked in New York on 26 July 1922, a squad of 30 US Customs personnel searched her and inspected her disembarking passengers and crew. Her Quartermaster was found in possession of undeclared diamonds and other jewelry worth a total of $10,000, and was arrested on suspicion of smuggling.

Many of Minnekahda's westbound passengers were migrants from Europe to the United States. In one sailing from Hamburg via Southampton to New York in October 1923 she carried 827 passengers, most of whom were German migrants.

On 30 November 1924 Minnekahda ran aground off the German coast near Hamburg. After 2,500 tons of her cargo was unloaded onto lighters, and she was refloated by 3 December 1924. Tugs assisted her to reach Hamburg. Her final voyage from Hamburg began on 10 January 1925.

== Tourist liner ==
In 1921 the US Congress had adopted the Emergency Quota Act, which set quotas to limit immigration to the US from each country. In April 1924 it passed the Immigration Act of 1924, which significantly reduced those quotas. In March 1925 Atlantic Transport Line announced that it would reduce Minnekahda's passenger accommodation to 750 berths, all tourist class. The company changed her European port of departure from Hamburg to London, and announced that she would now bring British tourists to the US. Her new route included a call at Boulogne. The return fare was £38 per passenger. Her first voyage on her new route started on 24 March 1925. In the 1925 tourist season she made ten round trips and carried 6,228 tourists.

On 4 and 5 December 1925 on a westbound voyage from London to New York, Minnekahda encountered a "hurricane-force" storm that tore away 15 feet (5 m) of railing from the after part of her deck. On 8 December she docked in New York, and US Customs officers immediately came aboard and searched her. Her officers complained at the roughness of the search, turning passengers' luggage "topsy-turvy". The Ship's Clerk said that Customs officers entered his cabin in his absence, threw his two suitcases on the floor and broke the locks.

Although announced in March 1925, Minnekahda's refit to 750 tourist berths was undertaken in the winter of 1925–1926, in Boulogne. A new boat deck was added to increase her promenade space, and her cabins and bathrooms were improved.

On 25 September 1927 Minnekahda struck a submerged shipwreck a few miles outside Boulogne. The collision tore off part of her bilge keel, damaged six hull plates on her starboard side and broke one of the blades of her starboard propeller. Admiralty charts showed no known wreck at that position. Trinity House sent a tender to mark the wreck with a buoy until it could be made safe.

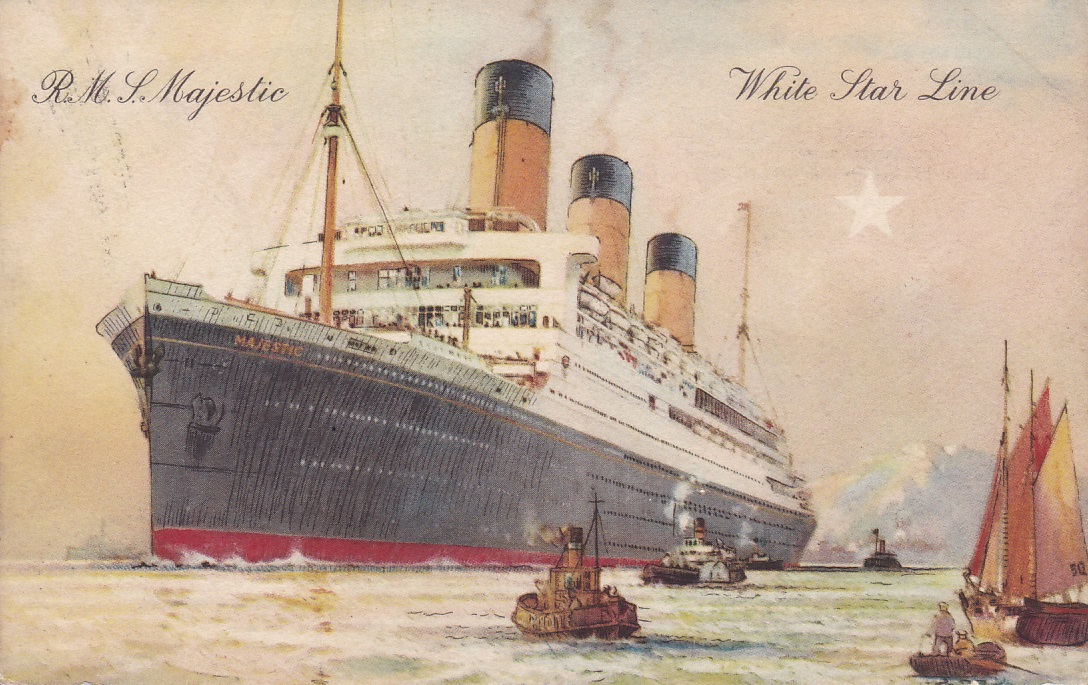
RMS Majestic, which in October 1927 took 500 passengers who had been booked to sail on Minnekahda

Minnekahda had been scheduled to embark passengers in London, and to leave on 1 October for New York. The sailing was canceled for her to be repaired, and her 500 passengers were transferred to RMS Majestic. Minnekahda resumed passenger service with a departure from London on 29 October.

In 1929 Minnekahda began the tourist season by leaving New York on 6 April, bound for London via Boulogne. She carried only 240 passengers, but that was 75 more than she carried on a similar sailing in April 1928. From this the IMM predicted a successful season in the North Atlantic trade.

In August 1929 the IMM reported that its business was thriving, thanks to the increasing popularity of tourist class travel. It announced that several ships had carried record numbers of passengers, including Minnekahda which carried 809 on a single sailing that departed on 29 June. IMM also stated that she carried a total of 1,932 passengers spread over three sailings, and this was a record for the IMM fleet.

In a storm on a westbound voyage on 31 January 1930 a huge wave hit Minnekahda. It tore off part of the deck railing from her starboard side, damaged some of her davits and carried away several of her ventilators. Several inches of water flooded her smoking room. Much of the rest of her voyage was also stormy. The ship reduced speed and reached New York on 5 February, two days late.

By mid-1930 Minnekahda was equipped with wireless direction finding. On a westbound voyage on 19 July 1930 a young woman passenger jumped overboard. The ship stopped her starboard engine, turned around, and launched two lifeboats. One of the boats, commanded by her Third Officer, rescued the young woman and took her back aboard, where she was admitted to the ship's hospital.

On 12 August 1931 Minnekahda took part in the successful test of a radio facsimile system. General Electric transmitted a copy of the Union-Star newspaper of Schenectady by wireless to Minnekahda and the United States Lines ship America. Charles J. Young, son of the RCA founder Owen D. Young, and Dr Ernst Alexanderson, invented the system. It took 15 minutes to copy a single page measuring 8 1/2 by 9 inches (220 by 230 mm).

== Fate ==
On 12 October 1931 Minnekahda docked in New York, ending her final voyage from London. She was laid up first at Pier 52, and then moved to Staten Island for the winter. Throughout her ten-year passenger career she had the same Master, Captain Johan Jensen, who was born in Denmark and became a US citizen.

By 1934 a new four-letter call sign KDKK replaced Minnekahda's code letters and earlier three-letter call sign.

By 1936 Minnekahda was laid up at Hoboken, New Jersey. That February she was sold for scrap. At first it was reported that Turner & Hickman of Glasgow had bought her for $125,000, but in mid-March it was reported that her buyers were WH Arnott, Young and Co. On 14 March she moved to the Morse Dry Dock in Brooklyn to be prepared for her voyage after four and a half years laid up.

Minnekahda was re-registered under the UK flag and embarked a UK crew. On 14 April she left New York for Scotland carrying a cargo of scrap iron. On 29 April she reached Arnott, Young's yard Dalmuir on the River Clyde to be scrapped.

== Bibliography ==
- Bonsor, NRP (1979). North Atlantic Seaway. Vol. 3. Jersey: Brookside Publications. pp. 1, 095–1, 096. ISBN 978-0905824024.
- Harnack, Edwin P (1930) [1903]. All About Ships & Shipping (4th ed.). London: Faber and Faber.
- "Part II.—List of vessels having a capacity of less than 80,000 cubic feet (if not holding Lloyd's R.M.C.).". Lloyd's Register of Shipping. Vol. I–Sailing Vessels, Owners, &c. London: Lloyd's Register of Shipping. 1917 – via Internet Archive.
- Lloyd's Register of Shipping. Vol. II–Steamers. London: Lloyd's Register of Shipping. 1917 – via Internet Archive.
- Lloyd's Register of Shipping. Vol. II–Steamers. London: Lloyd's Register of Shipping. 1921 – via Internet Archive.
- Lloyd's Register of Shipping (PDF). Vol. II–Steamers and Motorships of 300 Tons Gross and Over. London: Lloyd's Register of Shipping. 1930 – via Southampton City Council.
- Lloyd's Register of Shipping (PDF). Vol. II–Steamers and Motorships of 300 Tons Gross and Over. London: Lloyd's Register of Shipping. 1934 – via Southampton City Council.
- Lloyd's Register of Shipping. Vol. II–Steamers and Motorships of 300 Tons Gross and Over. London: Lloyd's Register of Shipping. 1935 – via Internet Archive.
- Mercantile Navy List. 1919 – via Crew List Index Project.
