= Traffic management =

Branch of logistics concerning the movement of vehicles

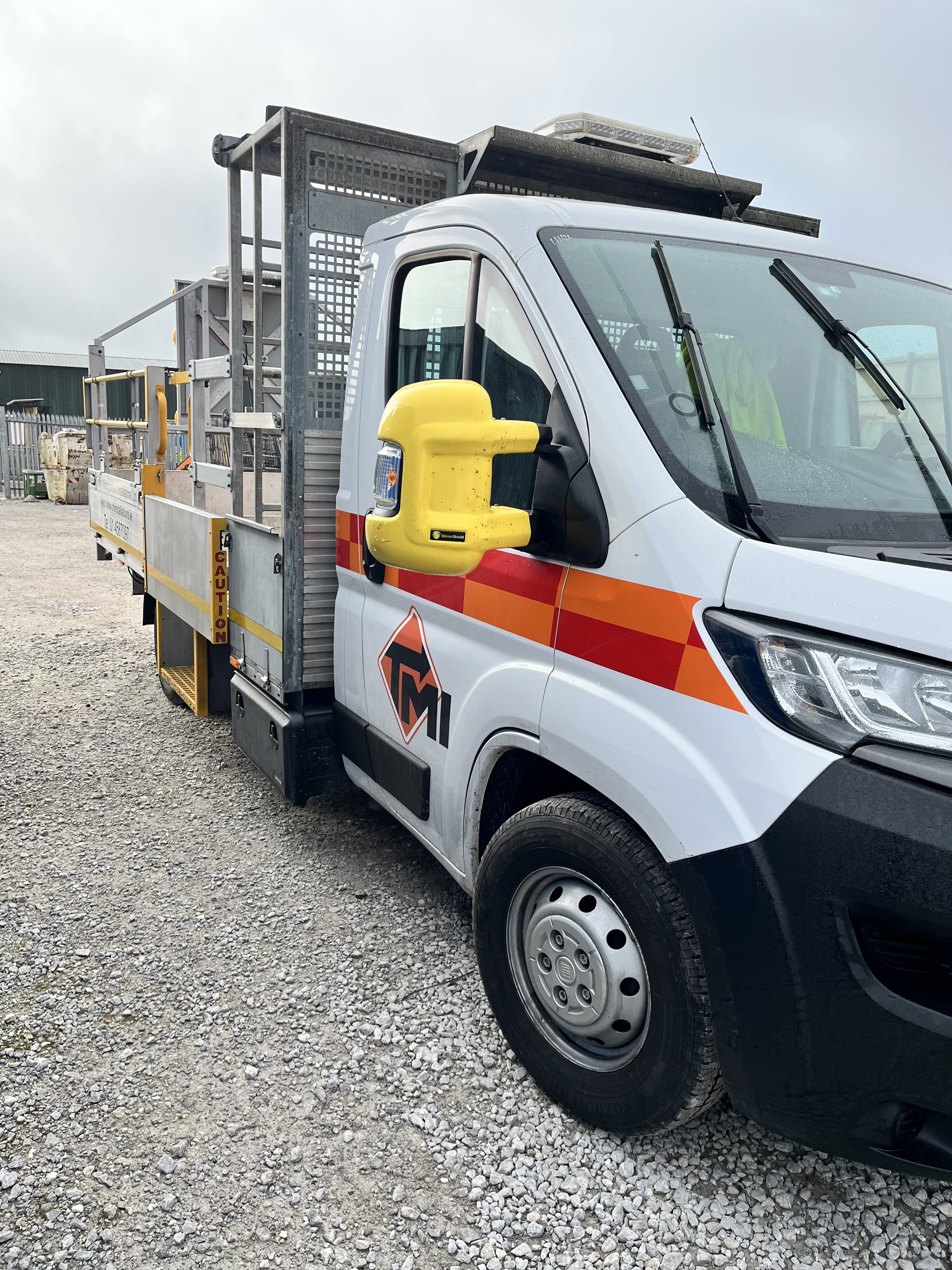
Specialised vehicle designed for traffic management installation

Traffic management is a key branch within logistics. It concerns the planning, control and purchasing of transport services needed to physically move vehicles (for example aircraft, road vehicles, rolling stock and watercraft) and freight.

Traffic management is implemented by people working with different job titles in different branches:

- Within freight and cargo logistics: traffic manager, assessment of hazardous and awkward materials, carrier choice and fees, demurrage, documentation, expediting, freight consolidation, insurance, reconsignment and tracking
- Within air traffic management: air traffic controller
- Within rail traffic management: rail traffic controller, train dispatcher or signalman
- Within road traffic management: traffic controller

== See also ==
- Air traffic control, a service provided by ground-based controllers who direct aircraft
- Road traffic control, directing vehicular and pedestrian traffic around a construction zone, accident or other road disruption
- Traffic control in shipping lanes
- Urban (peak-hour) traffic management
