= SS Maryland (1913) =

Steam Ship

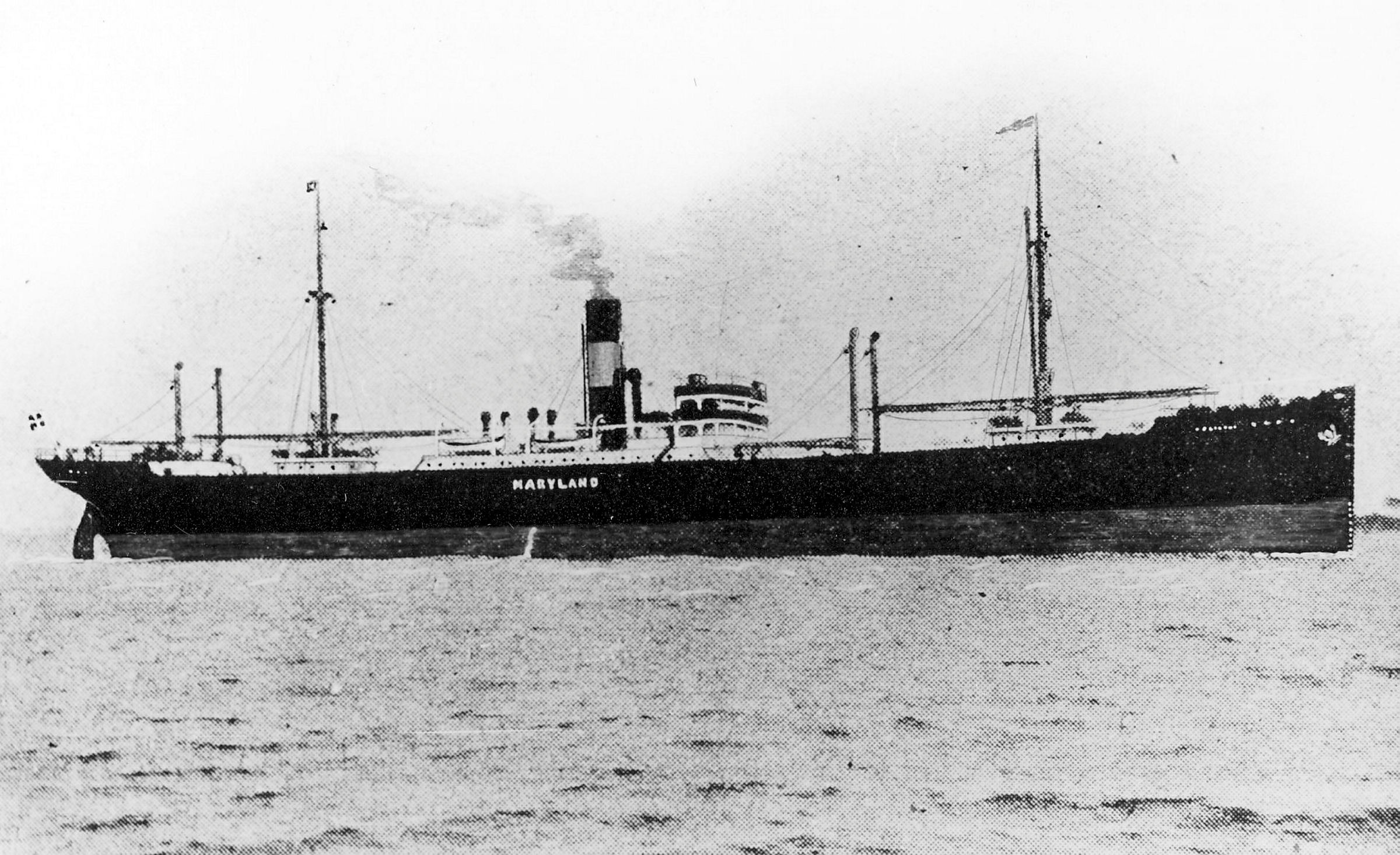
- SS Maryland (Atlantic Transport Line)

History
- Name: (United Kingdom) SS Maryland
- Owner: Atlantic Transport Line
- Port of registry: Belfast, United Kingdom
- Route: London - New York
- Ordered: 1 July 1911
- Builder: Harland & Wolff
- Yard number: 448
- Launched: 4 September 1913
- Acquired: 1 November 1913
- In service: 1 November 1913
- Out of service: 22 September 1933
- Honours and awards: World War I service
- Fate: Scrapped

General characteristics
- Tonnage: 4,731 GRT, 2,962 NRT
- Length: 370 feet (110 m)
- Beam: 50 feet 4 inches (15.34 m)
- Depth: 31 feet (9.4 m)
- Decks: 5
- Installed power: 1 H&W quadruple expansion engine (24.5 inches (62 cm), 35 inches (89 cm), 50 inches (130 cm) & 73 inches (190 cm) x 54 inches (140 cm))
- Propulsion: Single screw, 392nhp
- Speed: 12 knots
- Notes: Sister ships Missouri (1913) and Mississippi (1914)

SS Maryland was a steam cargo and transport ship of the Atlantic Transport Line. She served as a troop ship and animal transport for the Allies during World War I.

== Construction ==
Maryland was built for Atlantic Transport Line service prior to the outbreak of World War I. She was ordered 1 July 1911, with her hull built by Mackie & Thomson, and was launched on 4 September 1913 from the Govan shipbuilding yard on the River Clyde in Glasgow. She arrived in tow at Belfast for fitting out by Harland & Wolff on 14 September 1913, where she was registered on 28 October, and delivered 1 November 1913.

While under construction, the vessel was under the supervision of Captain Tubb, marine superintendent, and Mr. B. P. Fielden, superintendent engineer of the Atlantic Transport Line.

Maryland, a 2-mast single-screw steamer, was built to Board of Trade survey standards and Harland & Wolff standard practice at the time, including a double bottom hull with water-tight bulkheads extending all the way to the upper deck. She had five steel decks and capacity for large cargo, with 16 derricks each capable of lifting five tons, 10 double purchase winches, a warping winch, and a steam windlass. Steering gear was standard Harland & Wolff type. There were contemporary accommodations for captain, officers, and crew, and the ship was fully fitted for electric lights, Marconi wireless telegraphy, and submarine signaling apparatus.

After undergoing successful trials, the ship was delivered on 1 November 1913, and proceeded to London to begin service under the command of Captain S. W. Watkins.

== World War I ==
Along with other ships from the Atlantic Transport Line, Maryland saw service throughout World War I. As a general cargo and cattle carrier, the vessel was especially suited for the transport of horses and mules. On 28 January 1919, "Q" Composite Squadron (A and B Squadrons) Surrey Yeomanry, along with 735 horses and mules, embarked on Maryland at Salonica for Batoum.

== Post-War ==
Maryland was sold for scrap on 22 September 1933 to the shipbreakers P & W MacLellan Ltd at Bo'ness, along with her sister ships SS Missouri (1913) and MS Mississippi (1914) the following month.
