= National Line =

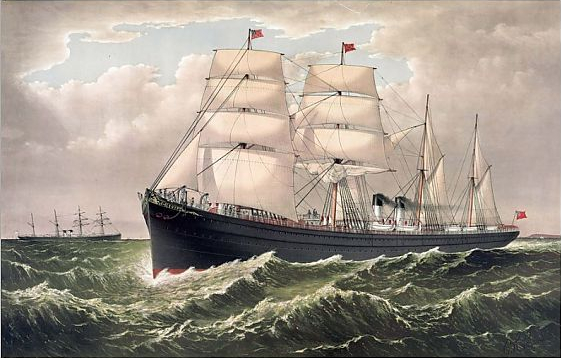
The magnificent steamships Egypt (forefront) and Spain, by Charles R. Parsons

The National Line, formally named the National Steam Navigation Company, was a British passenger line that operated steamship service in the North Atlantic Ocean in the late 19th century.

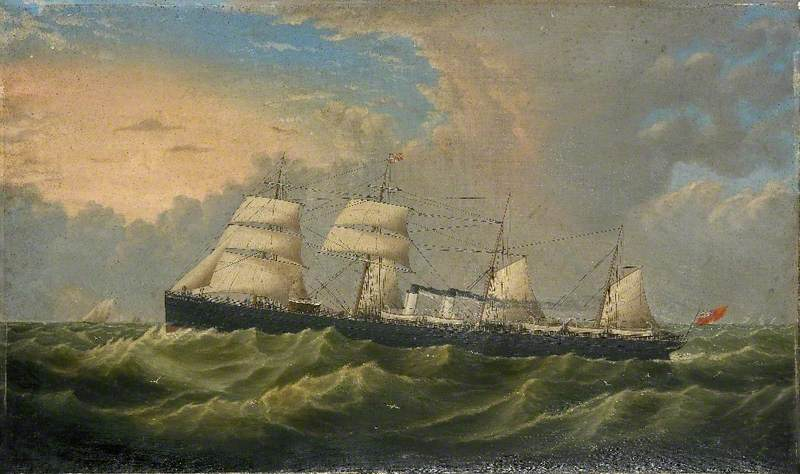
SS Egypt launched 1871, painting by Joseph Witham

The company was founded in 1863, with the intention of serving the southern United States when it appeared that the Confederacy would win the Civil War and secede, as the Confederate states had a substantial cotton trade with Britain. After the Union victory, National quickly changed course and focused on carrying lower-class passengers and cargo on the traditional Atlantic route to New York City, initially from Liverpool and later from London as well. The line was successful for a time, paying a £120,000 dividend in 1869 and expanding its fleet to twelve ships by 1871. By the late 1800s, however, business had declined, and it discontinued its regular New York service in 1892. National was later purchased by the Atlantic Transport Line and operated freight services only in the later part of its life until it was liquidated in 1914.

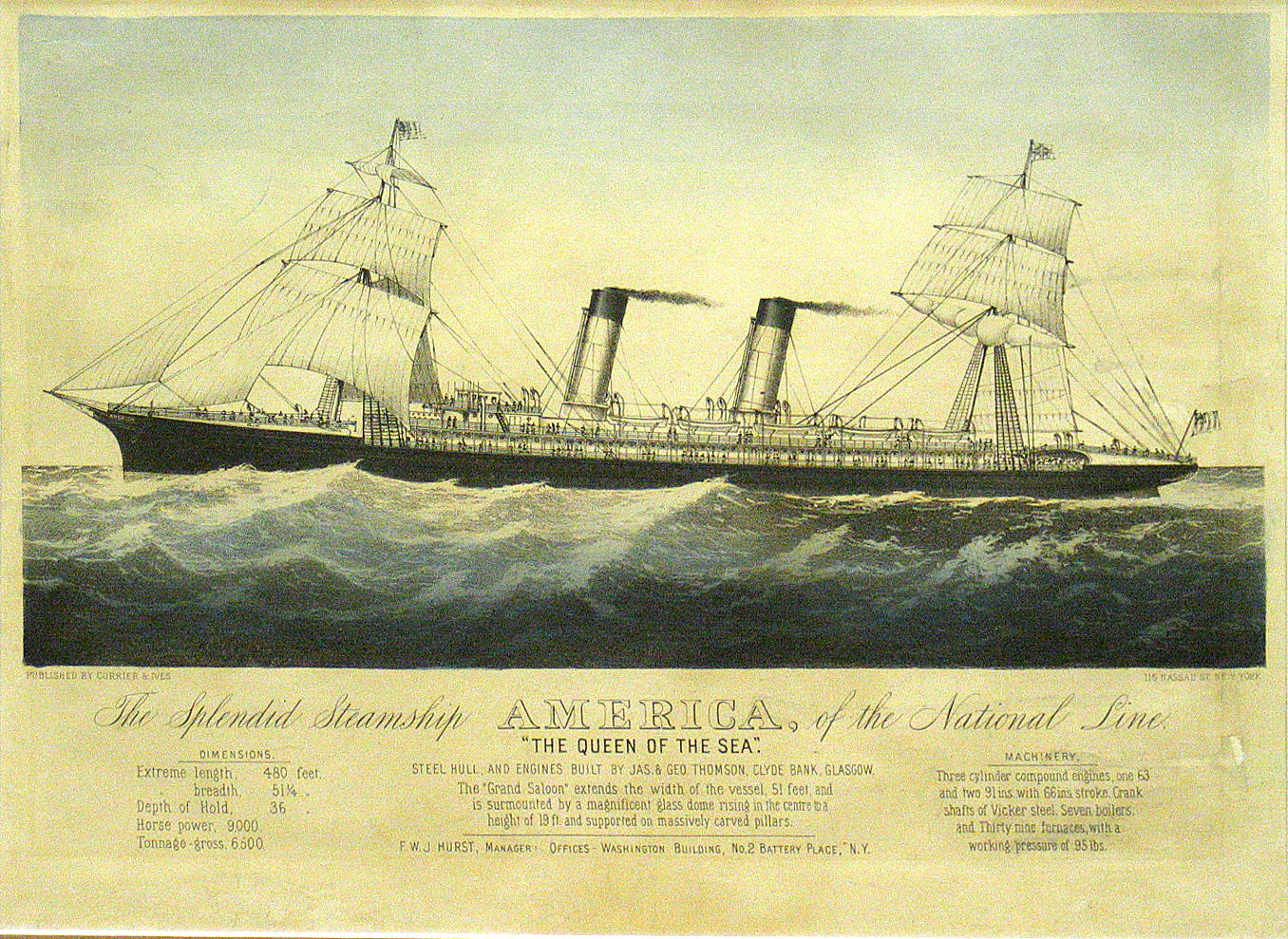
The America, launched 1883
