= Traffik (disambiguation) =

Traffik is a 1989 British TV miniseries.

Traffik or Trafik may also refer to:

- Traffik (film), 2018 American horror-thriller film
- "Trafik!", 2024 song by Käärijä and Joost Klein

== See also ==
- Traffic (disambiguation)
- Trafficking
