= Traffic (disambiguation) =

Traffic is road users including pedestrians and vehicles using the public way for purposes of travel.

Traffic or Trafic may also refer to:

== Arts and entertainment ==
=== Film and television ===
- Trafic (Traffic), a 1971 Italian-French comedy film
- Traffic (2000 film), an American crime drama film
  - Traffik, a 1989 British TV miniseries on which the 2000 film was based
  - Traffic (miniseries), a 2004 American TV miniseries based on the 2000 film
- Trafic (2004 film), a Romanian short film
- Traffic (2011 film), a Malayalam-language film
  - Traffic (2016 film), a Hindi remake
- Traffic (2024 film), a Romanian drama film

=== Music ===
- Traffic (band), an English rock band
  - Traffic (Traffic album), 1968
- Traffic (Estonian band)
- Traffic (ABC album), 2008
- Trafic (album), by Gaëtan Roussel, 2018
- "Traffic" (Stereophonics song), 1997
- "Traffic" (Tiësto song), 2003
- "Traffic", a 2019 song by Thom Yorke from Anima
- "Traffic", a 2019 song by Peppa Pig from My First Album
- "Traffic", a 2024 song by Cianne Dominguez
- "Trafik!", a 2024 song by Käärijä and Joost Klein

=== Other uses in arts and entertainment ===
- Traffic (art exhibition), 1996

== Vehicles ==
- Renault Trafic, a light commercial van

=== Ships ===
- SS Traffic (1872), a baggage tender of the White Star Line
- SS Traffic (1911), a ship's tender of the White Star Line

== Other uses ==
- Internet traffic, the flow of data around the Internet
- Network traffic, the flow of data around a network
- Web traffic, the amount of data sent and received by visitors to a web site
- Traffic (broadcasting), the scheduling of program material
- Traffic (conservation programme) or TRAFFIC, a non-governmental organisation
- Traffic Group, a sports event management company
- Traffic (journal), a scientific journal about signal transduction in health and disease
- Trafic (journal), a French arts and letters journal

== See also ==
- Traffik (disambiguation)
