= Atlantic Transport Line =

American passenger shipping line based in Baltimore, Maryland

- House flag

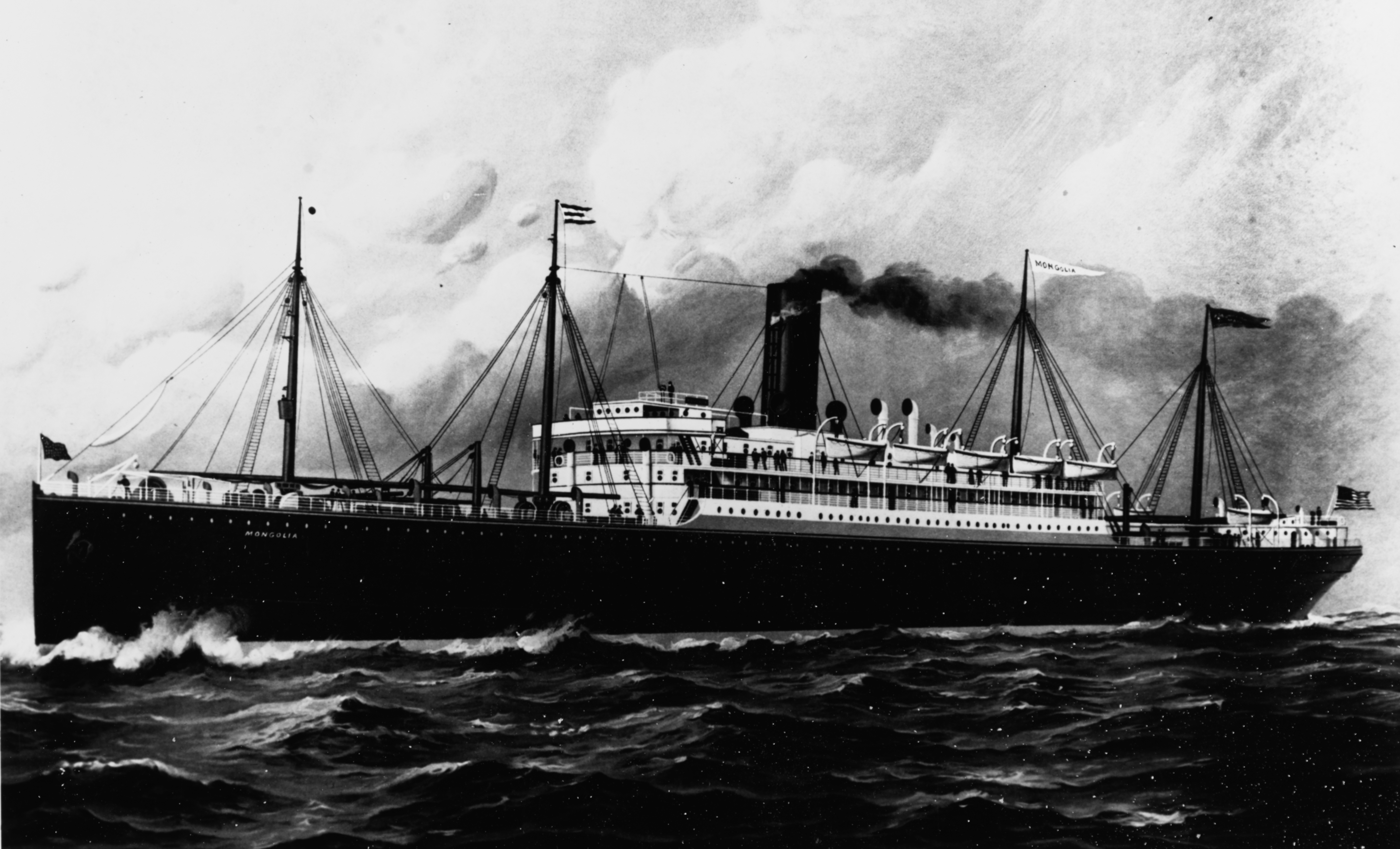
- SS Mongolia underway
- Industry: Shipping
- Founded: 1881 in United States
- Founder: Bernard N Baker
- Defunct: 1936
- Headquarters: Baltimore, Maryland, United States
- Area served: North Atlantic
- Services: Passenger and Cargo transport, including live cattle

The Atlantic Transport Line was an American passenger shipping line based in Baltimore, Maryland. In 1901 the company was folded into the International Mercantile Marine Company (IMM).

== History ==
The line developed with railroad support as an offshoot of Bernard N. Baker's Baltimore Storage and Lighterage Company in 1881. Although American owned, the Atlantic Transport Line operated from Britain, with British registered and crewed vessels, most of which were British built. General cargo, live cattle and small numbers of passengers were carried from Baltimore and Philadelphia to British ports and the line developed a reputation for shipping valuable horses. A full-scale weekly passenger service between New York and London commenced in 1892 and the line is best remembered for its exclusively first class direct London to New York passenger/cargo service operated by its four Minne-class ships: Minneapolis, Minnehaha, Minnetonka and Minnewaska from 1900 to 1915.

In 1898 the U.S. Government bought seven of the Line's ten ships for use as military transports in the Spanish–American War (Baker lent another for use as a hospital ship). The line survived this potentially devastating blow because Baker pulled off a sensational deal and bought a British competitor's five brand new ships almost immediately as replacements. The Atlantic Transport Company of West Virginia was formed at this time to assert American ownership of the line's overseas assets. Baker's attempt to sell the line to British owners in the late 1890s sparked the chain of events that lead to the formation of the IMM.

The line's most important ships were all sunk during the First World War. After the war four huge replacements for the Minne-class ships were planned. Only two of these were built however, and the passenger service, which recommenced in 1923, never matched pre-war successes. With first class travel declining, a tourist third-class ship was introduced in 1925 and for two seasons operated a second. But the line was faltering even before the Wall Street crash and with the recession of 1931 its remaining ships were laid up or transferred to other IMM lines, and it effectively ceased to exist. The American holding company survived until 1936. Minnewaska was the last ship the Atlantic Transport Line operated.

== Fleet ==
Ship	Launched	ATL Service	Notes
Columbia	1914	1935–1936	Ex Belgic, ex Belgenland. Scrapped 1936
Korea	1901	1915–1916	Purchased from the Pacific Mail Steamship Company in 1915. In 1916 the ship was sold to Toyo Kisen Kaisha of Yokohama, Japan, and renamed Korea Maru. Scrapped 1934
Mackinaw	1890	1897–1923	Ex British Crown. Scrapped 1923
Maine	1887	1887–1899	Ex Swansea. Converted to a hospital ship for the Boer War. Wrecked 1914
Maine	1903	1903–1907	Sold and renamed Virginian. Scrapped 1948
Maine	1904	1913–1917	Ex Sierra Blanca. Torpedoed by UC-17 1917
Maine	1919	1920–1931	Ex War Riddle. Sold and renamed Skala. Scrapped 1955
Manchuria	1903	1915–1918	Requisitioned as a troop transport. On return transferred to the American Line. Sold and renamed President Johnson. Resold and renamed Santa Cruz. Scrapped 1952
Manhattan	1898	1898–1927	Chartered to the Phoenix Line 1911 – 1914. Scrapped 1927
Manitoba	1892	1892–1898	Sold to US Government and renamed USAT Logan. Sold in 1922, scrapped 1924
Manitou	1897	1898–1902	Ex Victoria. Transferred to Red Star Line. Requisitioned 1915 – 1919. On return renamed Poland then transferred to White Star Line in 1922. Scrapped 1925.
Marquette	1897	1898–1904	Ex Boadicea. Transferred to Red Star Line. Torpedoed by U-35 1915
Maryland	1886	1886–1912	Sold and renamed Redentore. Wrecked 1913
Maryland	1913	1913–1933	Scrapped 1933
Massachusetts	1891	1892–1898	Requisitioned by US Government and renamed USAT Sheridan. Scrapped in 1923
Massachusetts	1902	1902–1911	Sold and renamed Kansan. Torpedoed 1917
Memphis	1891	1907–1908	Ex America. Scrapped 1908
Menominee	1897	1898–1905	Ex Alexandria. Transferred to Red Star Line. Scrapped 1927
Mesaba	1897	1898–1918	Ex Winifreda. Torpedoed by UB-118 1918
Mesaba	1918	1919–1925	Ex War Icarus. Transferred to White Star Line and renamed Delphic. Subsequently, sold to Clan Line and renamed Clan Farquhar. Scrapped 1948
Michigan	1890	1890–1896	Transferred to the National Line. Sold to US Government and renamed USAT Kilpatrick. Resold and renamed Acropolis. Subsequently, resold and renamed Washington. Finally sold and renamed Great Canton. Scrapped 1924
Michigan	1899	1899–1900	Transferred to the Dominion Line and renamed Irishman. Scrapped 1924
Michigan	1897	1914–1926	Ex Monmouth, ex Irishman. Sold and renamed Candido. Scrapped 1927
Minneapolis	1899	1900–1915	Requisitioned by UK government. Torpedoed by U-35 1916
Minnehaha	1900	1900–1917	Torpedoed by U-48 1917
Minnekahda	1917	1920–1931	Laid up and eventually scrapped in 1936
Minnesota	1887	1887–1926	Renamed Mahopac in 1917. Scrapped in 1926
Minnesota	1903	1917–1923	Chartered by US government in 1919 and renamed USS Troy. Scrapped 1923
Minnesota	1900	1927–1930	Ex Zeeland, ex Northland. Scrapped 1930
Minnetonka	1901	1901–1918	Torpedoed by U-64 and U-67 1918
Minnetonka	1924	1924–1934	Scrapped 1934
Minnewaska	1894	1897–1898	Ex Persia. Requisitioned by the US Government and renamed USAT Thomas. Scrapped 1928
Minnewaska	1908	1909–1916	Total loss after being mined by UC-23 1916
Minnewaska	1923	1923–1931	Sold to Red Star Line. Scrapped 1934
Mississippi	1890	1890–1898	Requisitioned by US government and renamed USAT Buford. Scrapped 1929
Mississippi	1902	1902–1906	Transferred to Red Star Line and renamed Samland. Transferred to White Star Line 1911 – 1913 and temporarily renamed Belgic. Scrapped 1931
Mississippi	1914	1914–1933	ATL's only diesel-powered ship. Scrapped 1933
Missouri	1888	1888–1898	Sold to US Government and renamed USAT Egbert. Sold and renamed Stanley Dollar. Wrecked 1905
Missouri	1903	1903–1908	Sold and renamed Missourian. Torpedoed by U-52 1917
Missouri	1913	1913–1933	Scrapped 1933
Mobile	1892	1892–1898	Sold to US Government and renamed USAT Sherman. Resold and renamed Calawaii. Scrapped 1933
Mobile	1890	1907–1911	Ex Europe. Sold and renamed Throger. Renamed Guvernoren. Burnt at sea 1915
Mohawk	1892	1892–1898	Sold to US Army and renamed USAT Grant. Converted to dredge USED Chinook. Scrapped 1946
Mohawk	1885	1899–1903	Ex Belgic. Scrapped 1903
Mohegan	1898	1898–1898	Ex Cleopatra. Sank 1898
Mongolia	1903	1915–1920	Transferred to the American Line and subsequently to the Panama Pacific Line. Sold and renamed President Fillimore. Subsequently, resold and renamed Panamanian. Scrapped 1947
Montana	1887	1887–1913	Sold and renamed Resurrezione. Scrapped 1926
Montana	1919	1920–1935	Ex Defender. Scrapped 1935
Montauk	1919	1920–1935	Ex Champion. Scrapped 1935
Siberia	1901	1915–1916	Sold and renamed Siberia Maru. Scrapped 1934
Suffolk	1881	1882–1886	Wrecked 1886
Surrey	1881	1881–1889	Renamed Michigan in 1888. Sold and renamed Harry Luckenbach. Torpedoed by U-84 1918
Sussex	1882	1882–1885	Sank 1885
