= SS Minnetonka (1924) =

Passenger ship of the Atlantic Transport Line

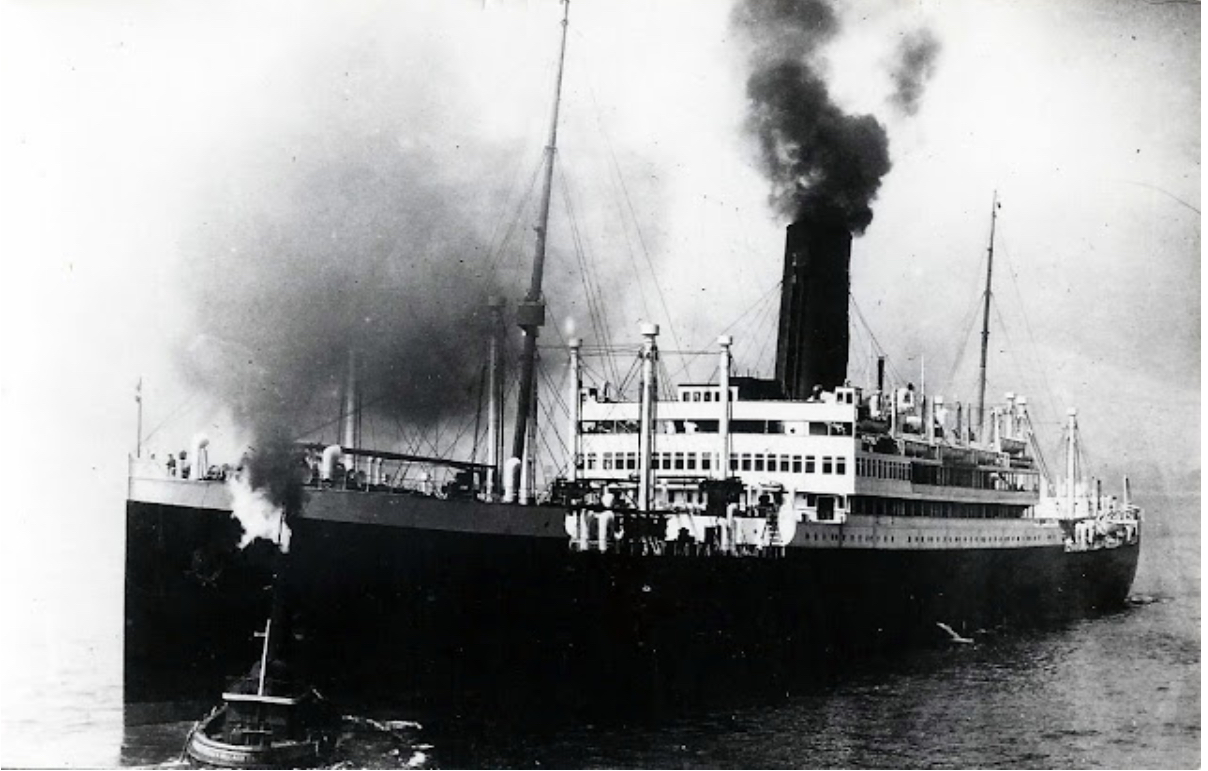
- SS Minnetonka departing New York City

History

United Kingdom
- Owner: Atlantic Transport Line
- Route: London–New York City
- Builder: Harland & Wolff
- Launched: 10 January 1924
- In service: 1924
- Out of service: 1933
- Fate: Scrapped 1934

General characteristics
- Tonnage: 21,998 gross register tons
- Length: 626 ft (191 m)
- Beam: 80 ft (24 m)
- Propulsion: Steam turbines
- Capacity: 369 passengers

SS Minnetonka was a combination ocean liner and cargo operated by the Atlantic Transport Line in North Atlantic service during the 1920s and 1930s.

Minnetonka was built by Harland & Wolff and entered service in May 1924, sailing between London and New York City. She operated for only nine years before being laid up in 1933 and scrapped the following year in Bo'ness, Scotland.

She was 626 feet (191 m) long, with a beam of 80 feet (24 m) and measured 21,998 gross register tons. She was powered by steam turbines that drove twin screws, giving her a service speed of 16 knots (18 mph). She had a passenger capacity of 369, all in first class.
