= SS Traffic (1872) =

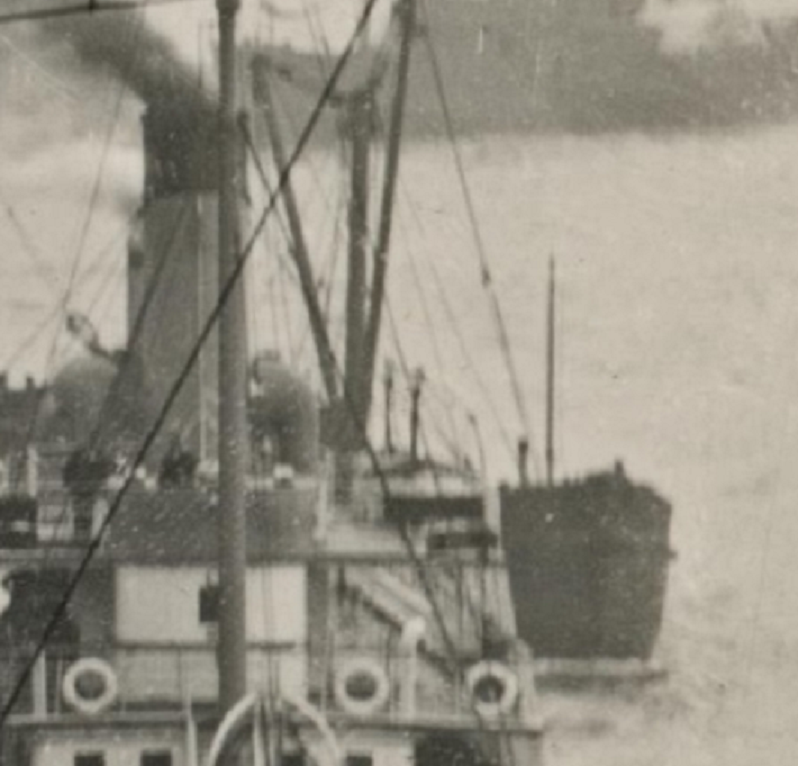
- Traffic behind Magnetic in 1896

History

United Kingdom
- Name: SS Traffic
- Owner: White Star Line (1872–1898); J. Callendar (1898–1900); Liverpool Lighterage Co. (1900–1955)
- Operator: White Star Line (1873–1898)
- Port of registry: Liverpool
- Route: Served in Mersey
- Ordered: 1872
- Builder: Philip Speakman, Runcorn
- Yard number: Belvedere Yard
- Laid down: 1872
- Launched: 22 September 1872
- Completed: January 1873
- In service: 1873
- Out of service: May 1941
- Identification: United Kingdom Official Number 69263
- Fate: Scrapped 1955
- Notes: Can be classified as a steam lighter

General characteristics
- Type: Ship's tender
- Tonnage: 155 GRT; 83 NRT
- Length: 101.8 ft (31.0 m)
- Beam: 23.6 ft (7.19 m)
- Depth: 9.5 ft (2.9 m)
- Installed power: 40 hp
- Propulsion: Steam engine by W P Gaulton of Manchester, Single Screw
- Speed: 6 knots loaded
- Capacity: 250 tons
- Crew: Approximately 7

SS Traffic was a baggage tender of the White Star Line, built in 1872 by Philip Speakman in Runcorn and made of English Oak.

== General career ==
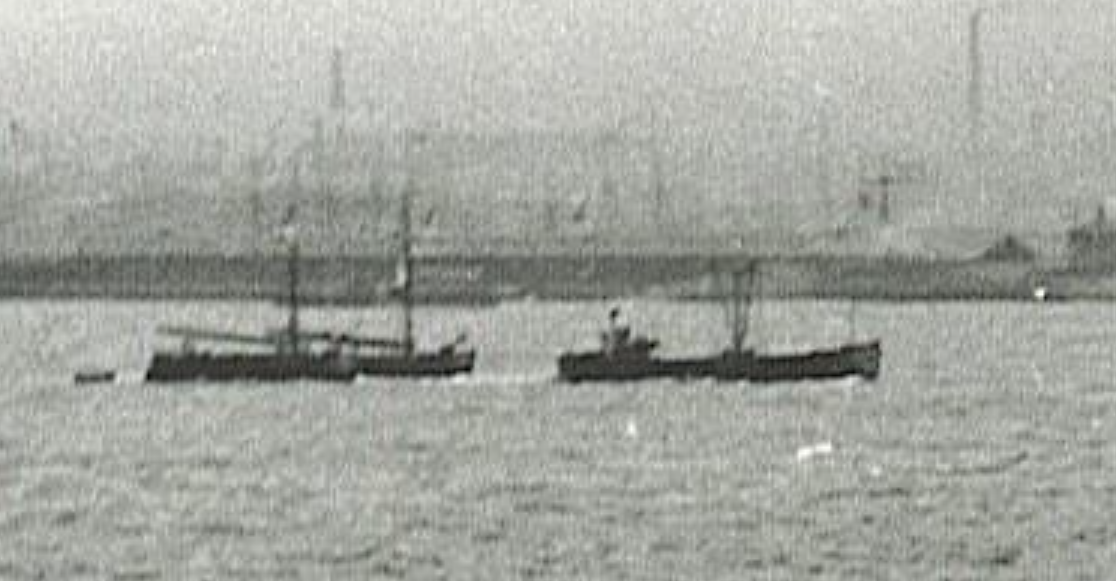
Traffic towing barges in 1885

She was launched on 22 September 1872, completed by January 1873 and registered on 21 May that year. She was outfitted with machinery at the Old Quay Dock by Mr. W. P. Gaulton, an engineer from Manchester. Due to being a single person rather than her company, the fitting out took several months to construct her machinery, and she only entered service four months after launch. She was based at the Port of Liverpool, and maintained a 25-year career with White Star. Traffic sometimes served as a cargo vessel, carrying goods from dock to dock, though mainly she was used to tender to the larger liners.

Traffic was replaced by SS Pontic, which entered service in 1894, and was laid up in Hornby Dock by March 1898, and put up for sale. She was bought by James Callendar later that year where she was briefly used, before being sold to the Liverpool Lighterage Company in 1900, and served for nineteen years as an active barge. During 1919, Traffic was repurposed a sullage barge, and her machinery was removed. On the night of 3 May 1941, she was sunk in the May Blitz at the Canada Dock in Liverpool, and was raised later that October. Due to not appearing on registrations after, it is likely the old and rotten ship was hulked. She was reported to have been broken up at Tranmere by 1955, at an age of eighty-two years.

== Incidents ==
- On 20 March 1873, Traffic loaded 16 tons of coal on board from the Atlantic, which would later sink with great loss of life due to a coal shortage that same voyage.
- On 10 January 1878, Traffic was run into by the steamship Maggie Ann after tendering to the RMS Germanic at Liverpool and was sunk. The Maggie Ann damaged the starboard side of the Traffic at Albert pierhead, and was raised and repaired after.
- On 14 April 1881, a porter fell overboard and drowned when attempting to board RMS Germanic at Seacombe
- On 5 January 1886, while hoisting sacks using one of her cranes, a bolt snapped and the crane collapsed, killing one of her crew members.
- On April 16, 1890, a fireman on board the Traffic being transported to a liner jumped overboard and swam to the 1856 built paddle-tug Despatch. He was pulled aboard the tug and sent home after being taken by the police.
- On 3 August 1900, Traffic was towing a Mersey flat during a gale when both vessels foundered, and were refloated.
- On 6 August 1900, Livornese of 1871 collided with Traffic when changing docks. Livornese suffered minor damage, but Traffic was sunk. She was refloated shortly after and returned to service.
- On 9 August 1915, Kerman was departing Brunswick Dock, when her propeller caught the Traffic. The latter sank, and the former returned to her berth with a damaged propeller.
- On 3 May 1941 at night, she was sunk in the East Canada No 2. Branch at Liverpool by German aircraft during the 'May Blitz'. She was with a cargo of boxboards near the cargo ship Bra-Kar, and all 3 crew on Traffic were evacuated before she went down.

== See also ==
- SS Traffic (1911)
- SS Pontic
