= SS Nomadic =

Former tender

Coordinates: 54°36′23″N 5°54′40″W

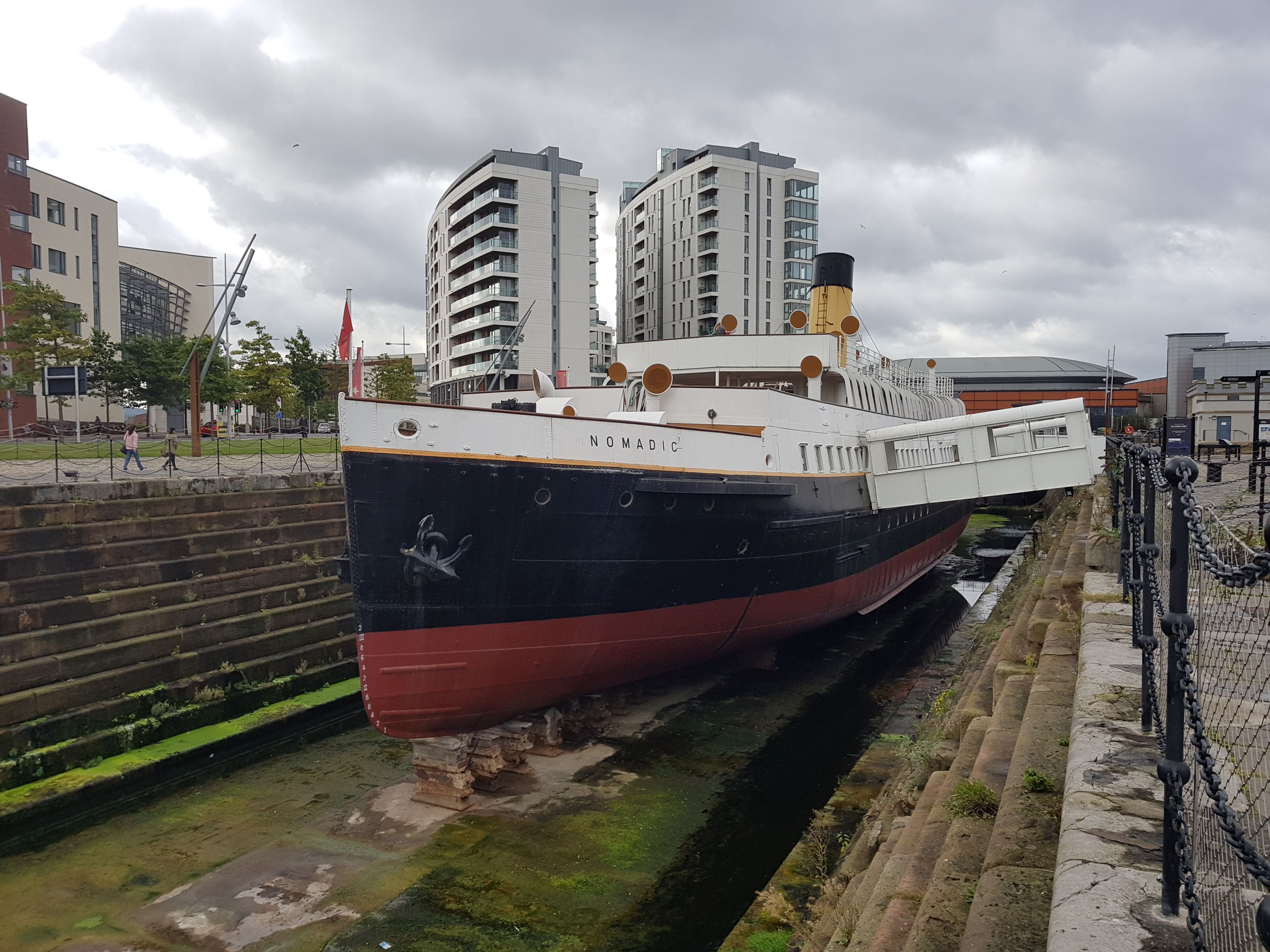
- SS Nomadic converted into a museum ship in Belfast, 2018

History

France
- Name: Nomadic (1911–1934); Ingenieur Minard (1934–1974)
- Owner: White Star Line (1911–1927); Société Cherbourgeoise Transbordement (1927–1934); Société Cherbourgeoise de Remorquage et de Sauvetage (1934–1968)
- Operator: White Star Line (1911–1934); Société Cherbourgeoise de Remorquage et de Sauvetage (1934–1968)
- Port of registry: Cherbourg, France
- Builder: Harland and Wolff, Belfast
- Yard number: 422
- Laid down: 22 December 1910
- Launched: 25 April 1911
- Completed: 27 May 1911
- Acquired: 27 May 1911
- Maiden voyage: 31 May 1911
- In service: 1911–1968
- Out of service: 4 November 1968
- Fate: Sold to UK

United Kingdom
- Name: Nomadic (1974–present)
- Operator: Titanic Belfast Ltd
- Port of registry: Cherbourg, France
- Acquired: 2006
- Identification: IMO number: 5161110
- Status: Museum ship, Belfast, County Antrim, Northern Ireland

General characteristics
- Tonnage: 1,273 GRT
- Length: 220 ft (67 m)
- Beam: 37 ft (11 m)
- Draught: 8 ft (2.4 m)
- Decks: 5
- Installed power: 2 single-ended Scotch marine boilers
- Propulsion: 2 double-expansion engines powering 2 triple-bladed propellers
- Speed: 12 knots (22 km/h; 14 mph)
- Capacity: 1,000 passengers
- Crew: 14

SS Nomadic is a former tender of the White Star Line, launched on 25 April 1911 at Belfast, that is now on display in Belfast's Titanic Quarter. She was built to transfer passengers and mail to and from the ocean liners RMS Olympic and RMS Titanic. She is the only surviving vessel designed by Thomas Andrews, who also helped design those two ocean liners, and the last White Star Line vessel in existence today.

== Background ==
Nomadic was one of two vessels commissioned by the White Star Line in 1910 to tender for their new ocean liners RMS Olympic and RMS Titanic, which were too large to dock in Cherbourg Harbour. She and her running mate SS Traffic ferried passengers, their baggage, mail and ship's supplies to and from large ocean liners anchored offshore.

The keel of Nomadic was laid down in the Harland and Wolff shipyards, Belfast in 1910 (yard number 422). She was built on slipway No. 1 alongside RMS Olympic and RMS Titanic, which were constructed on slipways 2 and 3, of the Arrol Gantry, respectively. She was launched on 25 April 1911 and delivered to the White Star Line on 27 May, following sea trials.

== Construction ==
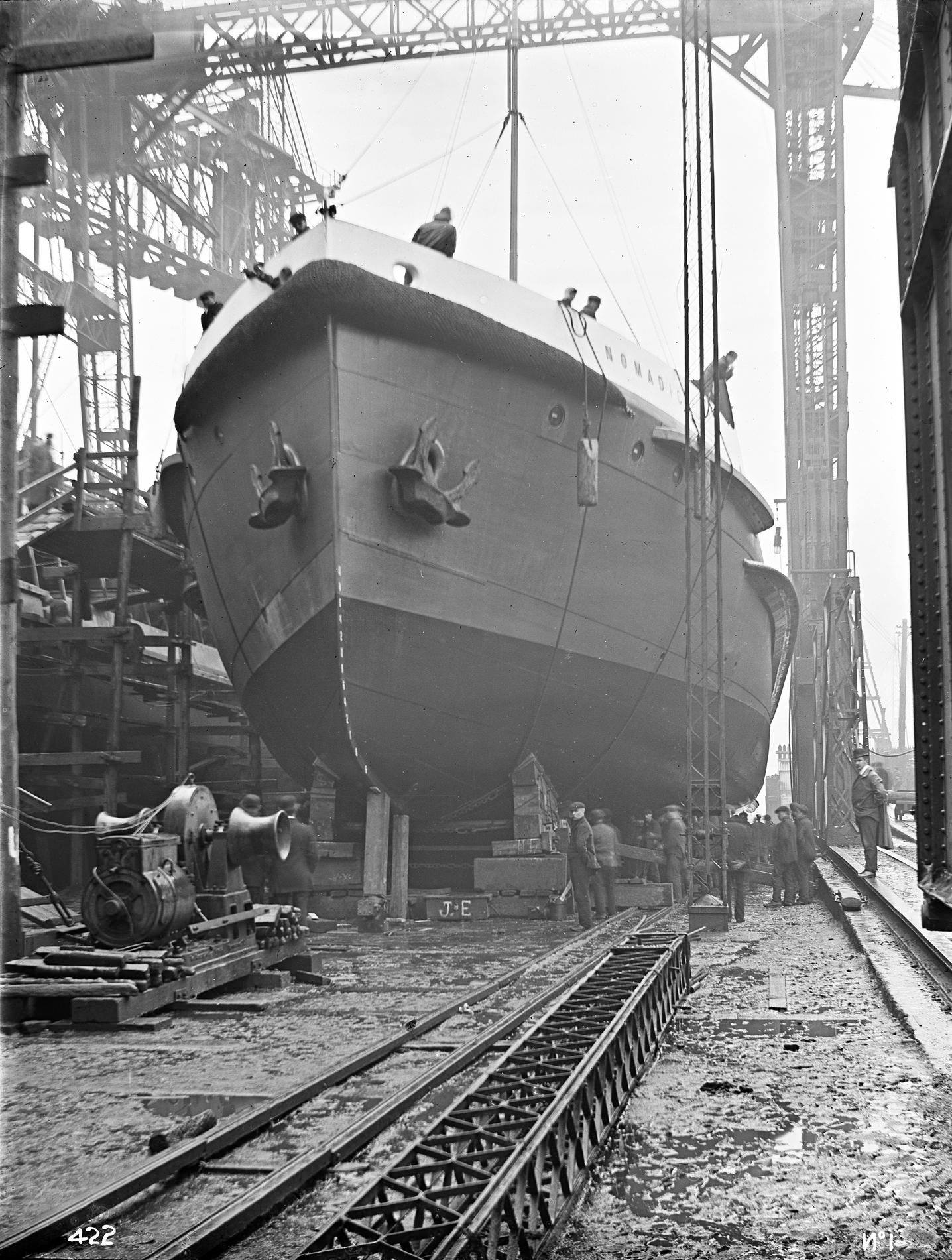
Nomadic under construction at Harland and Wolff, April 1911

The ship is 220 feet (67 m) long overall and 37 feet (11 m) wide, with a gross registered tonnage of 1,273 tons. Propulsion was provided by two single-ended coal-fired boilers and two compound steam engines, each driving two triple-bladed propellers of 7 feet (2.1 m) in diameter, which gave a service speed of 12 knots (14 mph; 22 km/h).

Nomadic is of steel construction, with steel frames, beams, bulkheads and riveted hull plating. She had four working decks with various hold spaces beneath. She could carry up to 1,000 passengers when fully loaded.

Passenger accommodation consisted of lower- and upper-deck passenger lounges and open deck areas on the bridge and flying bridge decks. The vessel was divided into first- and second-class passenger areas, with first-class passengers enjoying the fore areas of the ship. A small area in the aft end of the lower deck was assigned for overspill of third-class passengers from SS Traffic.

Internally, Nomadic was fitted out to a similar standard as the liners Olympic and Titanic, which she was built to serve. As such, she had more luxuries than most tenders of her day, with cushioned benches, tables, porcelain water fountains, sex-specific bathrooms and a buffet bar. She contained ornate decorative joinery and plasterwork, particularly in the first-class lounges of the ship.

Nomadic was built in the United Kingdom, but as she was operated in French coastal waters by a French crew, she had a number of peculiarities, such as imperial and metric draught marks on opposing sides of the hull.

== Service history ==
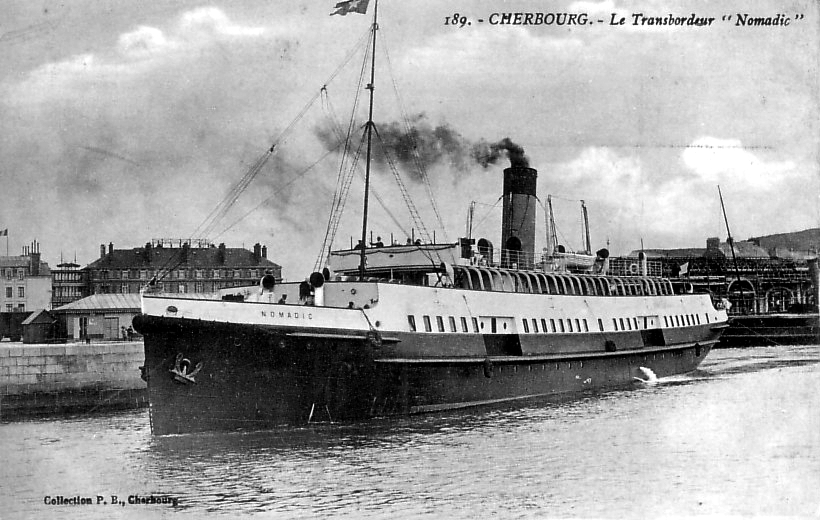
The Nomadic photographed in the port of Cherbourg in 1911.

Nomadic arrived in Cherbourg on 3 June 1911 to begin her tendering duties for the White Star Line. On 10 April 1912 she transported 274 passengers to RMS Titanic for the liner's ill-fated maiden voyage, including New York millionaire John Jacob Astor IV with his new wife Madeleine, Sir Cosmo Duff Gordon and his wife, couturière, Lucy, Lady Duff-Gordon, American journalist and United States Army officer Archibald Butt, Denver millionairess Margaret Brown, and mining tycoon Benjamin Guggenheim.

During World War I and until 1919, Nomadic was requisitioned by the French government, and she saw service as an auxiliary minesweeper, also ferrying American troops to and from the harbour in Brest (France). After the war, she returned to her tendering duties, but in 1927 she was sold and continued to tender under the ownership of the Compagnie Cherbourgeoise de Transbordement.

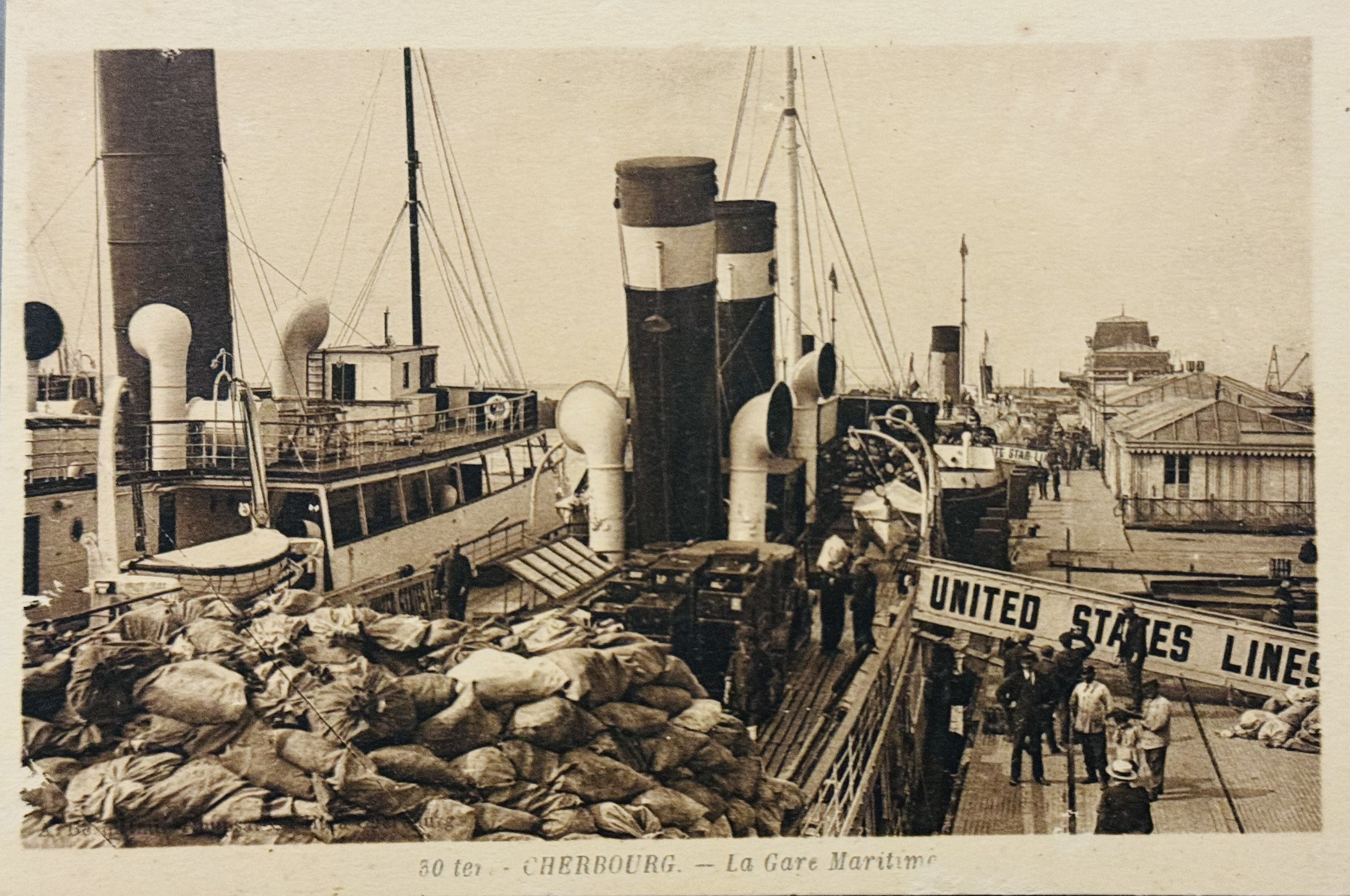
Passengers boarding Nomadic (left background) in Cherbourg

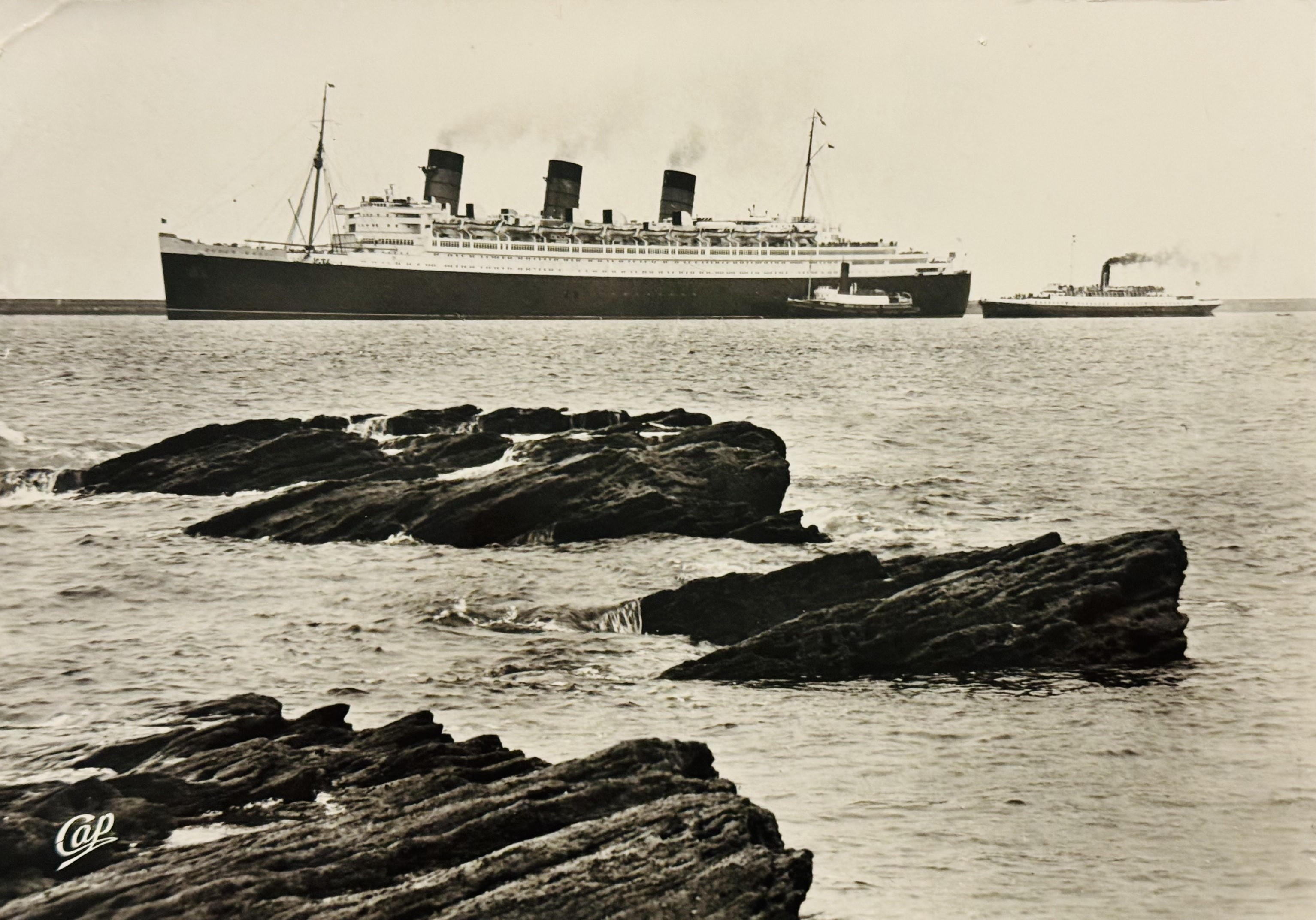
Ingenieur Minard serving Queen Mary

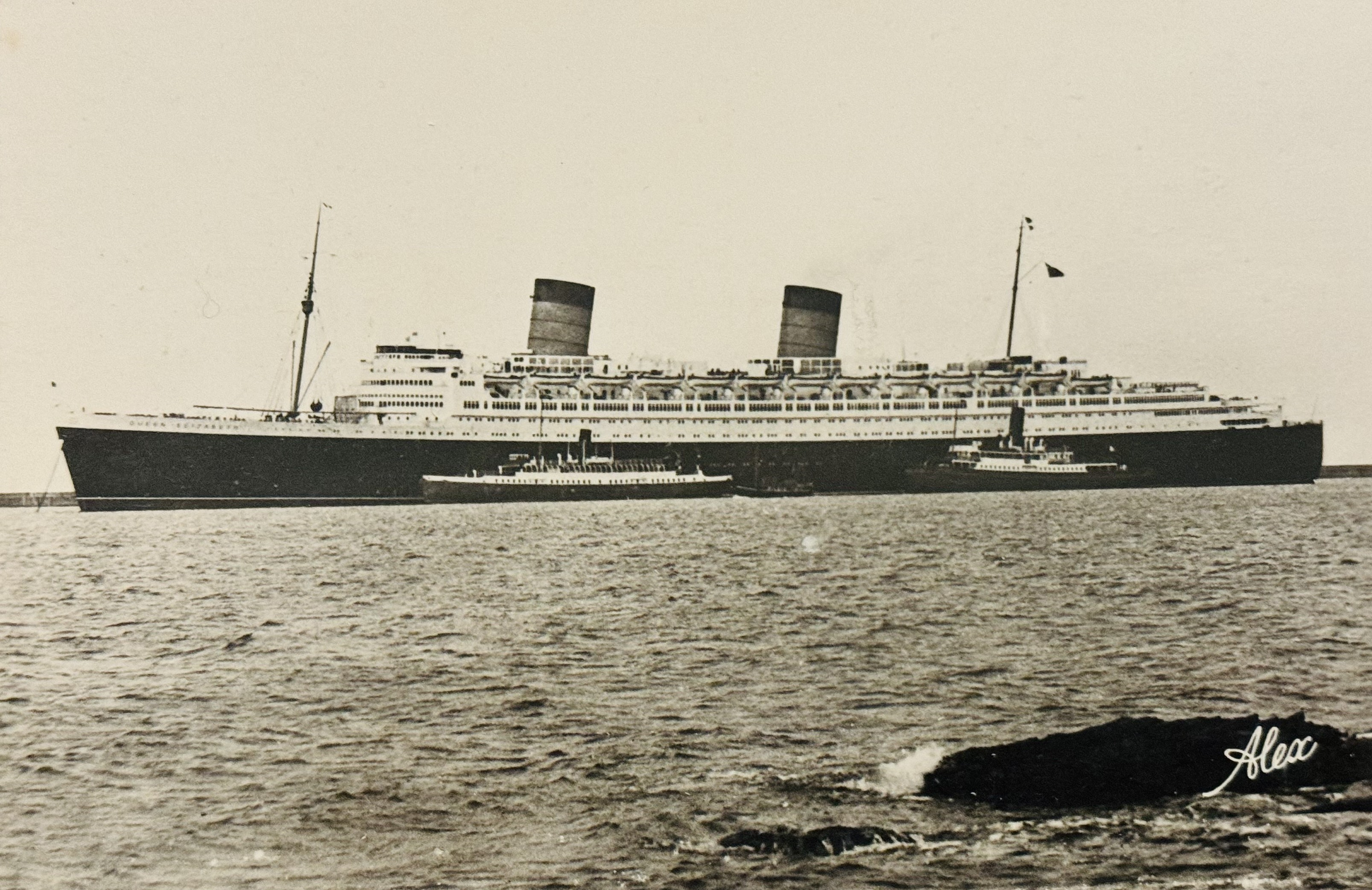
Ingenieur Minard serving Queen Elizabeth

Following the 1934 merger of White Star and Cunard Line and the opening of the enlarged port at Cherbourg which allowed liners to dock rather than anchor in the harbour, Nomadic was no longer needed and ceased her tendering duties. She was sold to the Société Cherbourgeoise de Sauvetage et de Remorquage (SCSR or Cherbourg Tow & Rescue Society) and renamed Ingenieur Minard.

During World War II, Ingenieur Minard again saw service; on 18 June 1940 she took part in the evacuation of Cherbourg. She was subsequently requisitioned by the Royal Navy and based in Portsmouth harbour, where she operated as an accommodation ship.

During the war, Cherbourg port was heavily damaged, so large ocean liners could no longer dock there. Ingenieur Minard was saved from the shipbreakers and again returned to tendering duties for the SCSR from Cherbourg. She served the ocean liners of the day, such as Queen Mary and Queen Elizabeth. She finally retired from these duties on 4 November 1968.

Ingenieur Minard was originally laid up in Cherbourg, but was moved to Le Havre on 26 April 1969. She lay idle for five years until bought by a private individual, Yvon Vincent, saving her from scrapping again. Her name was changed back to Nomadic and she was extensively converted into a floating restaurant and function vessel, and in October 1974 was relocated to the Seine in Paris. By 1999, the business was in financial difficulties and Nomadic was seized by the Paris harbour authorities in 2002. The authorities removed some of Nomadic's superstructure to tow her below the Seine's bridges. On 1 April 2002 she was towed out of Paris to Le Havre.

Following Vincent's death in March 2005, the authorities sought to dispose of the vessel and attempted to find a buyer for Nomadic, if no buyer was found, she risked being sold for scrap value. On learning of her fate, heritage and maritime enthusiasts (including the French Titanic Society, Belfast Industrial Heritage, Belfast Titanic Society and the Save Nomadic appeal) began campaigns to raise funds to buy the vessel. These campaigns were well supported by the public, particularly in Northern Ireland, but were unable to raise sufficient funds to meet Nomadic's reserve price.

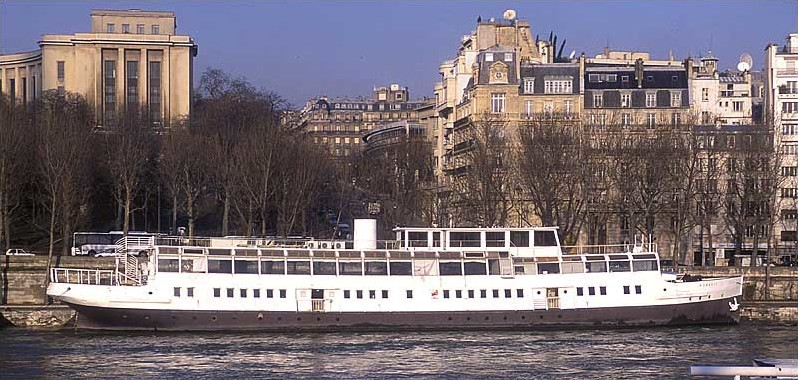
Nomadic as she appeared in 2000, docked on the Seine in Paris.

The campaigns, however, gained political and governmental support, and on 26 January 2006, the Northern Ireland government Department for Social Development bought the vessel at auction for €250,001 (the reserve price being €250,000).

SS Nomadic left Le Havre to return to Belfast on 12 July 2006, and arrived close to where she was built, on 18 July 2006. The vessel was welcomed back by the Department for Social Development Minister, David Hanson MP and the Deputy Lord Mayor of the City of Belfast, Councillor Ruth Patterson and a number of well-wishers. Nomadic arrived "piggy backed" on a marine transportation barge, which had been contracted by the department.

== Nomadic Charitable Trust ==
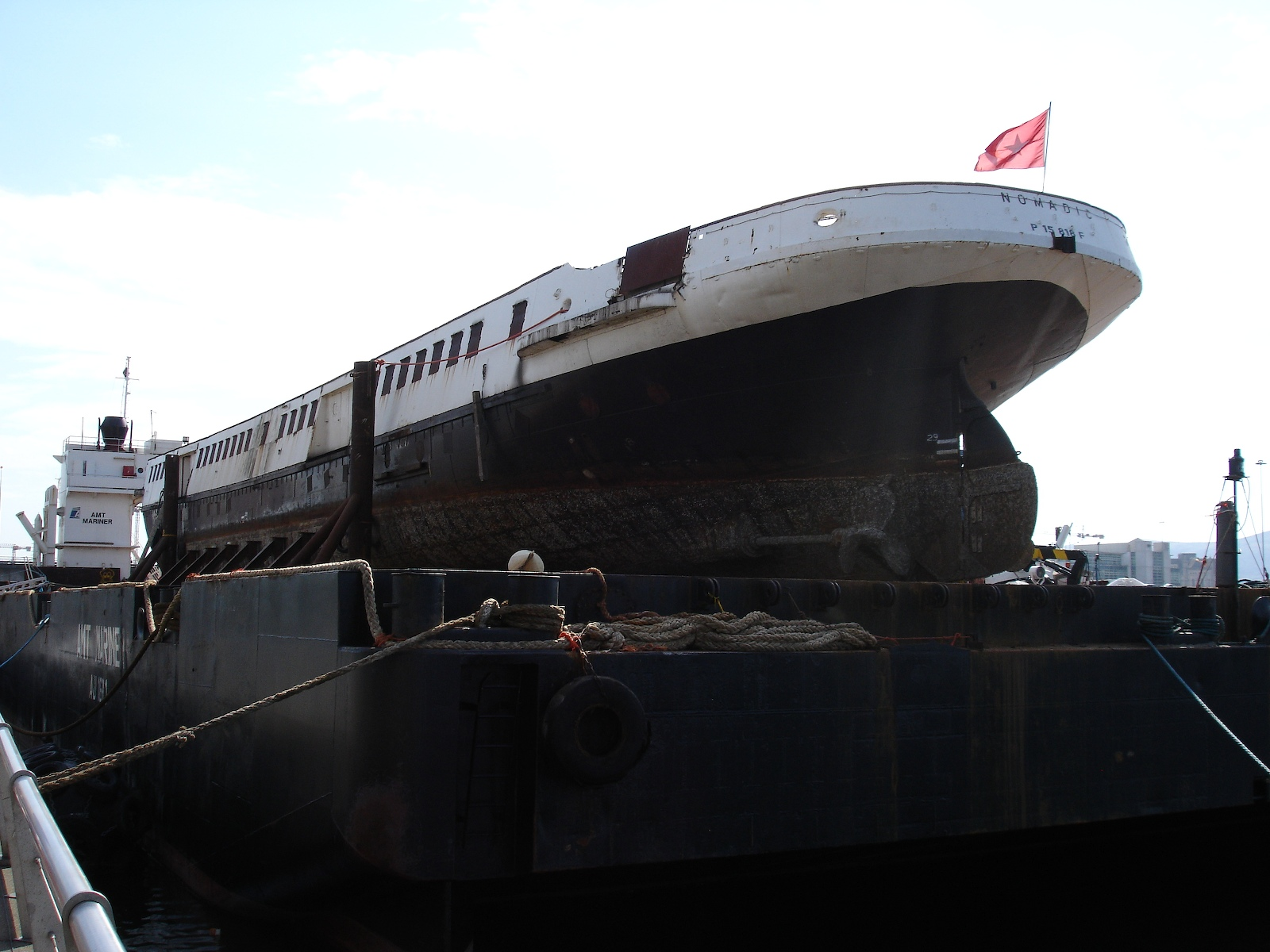
Nomadic arriving in Belfast, 18 July 2006

The Northern Ireland Department for Social Development set up a voluntary charitable trust, the Nomadic Charitable Trust (NCT) in December 2006, to take ownership of the vessel and oversee her conservation and restoration. The NCT's stated aim is; "To restore the SS Nomadic and to make her accessible to the public, to ensure she can play a key role in the ongoing celebration of Titanic, ensure a lasting legacy to celebrate our maritime and industrial heritage and as a catalyst for tourism, social and economic development".

The NCT transferred ownership of Nomadic to the Titanic Foundation in April 2015. The ship is now run by Titanic Belfast Nomadic Limited and incorporated into the Titanic Belfast visitor attraction.

== Nomadic Preservation Society ==
The Nomadic Preservation Society (NPS) was also founded in 2006. In 2006 the NPS had found and made aware to the NCT of the 1907-built cargo ship on Lake Victoria in East Africa, SS Nyanza, that has boilers and triple-expansion engines of a similar size to those originally installed in SS Nomadic. Nyanza's owner intended to convert her to diesel power and scrap her steam engines and boilers, so NPS suggested that NCT buy them to install in Nomadic. Nomadic's original boilers and engines were scrapped in 1974 when she was converted to a floating restaurant. In 2008 the NPS alleged that Nyanza's owner had heard nothing from the NCT for 18 months and that Nyanza's engines and boilers were in danger of being removed and scrapped. NPS launched an independent fundraising appeal to rescue the engines and boilers but this fell short of its goal. After the transfer of Nomadic's ownership, the NPS went dormant in 2016 and in January 2021 decided to disband.

== Restoration and conservation ==
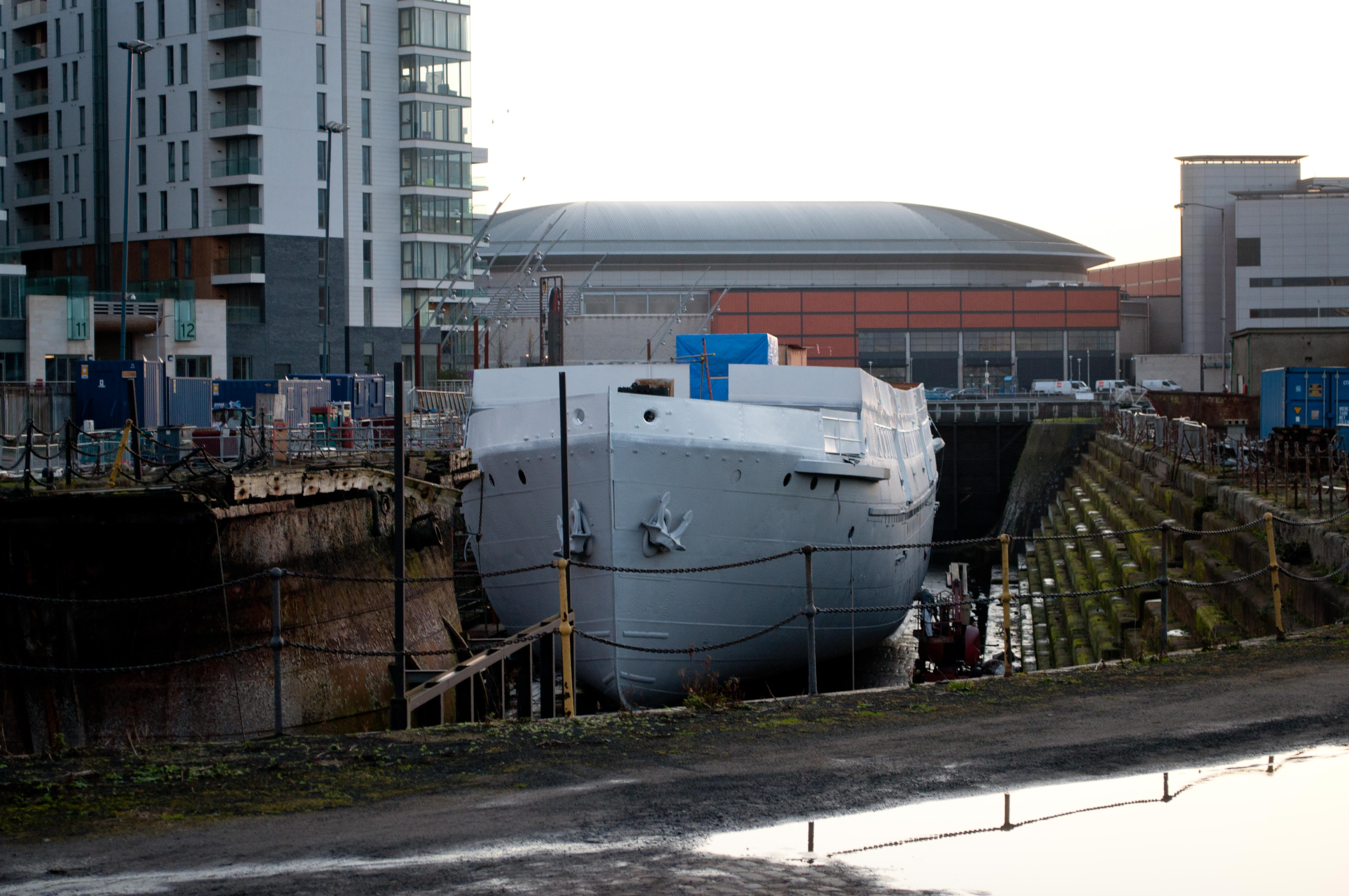
Nomadic during her restoration (November 2011).

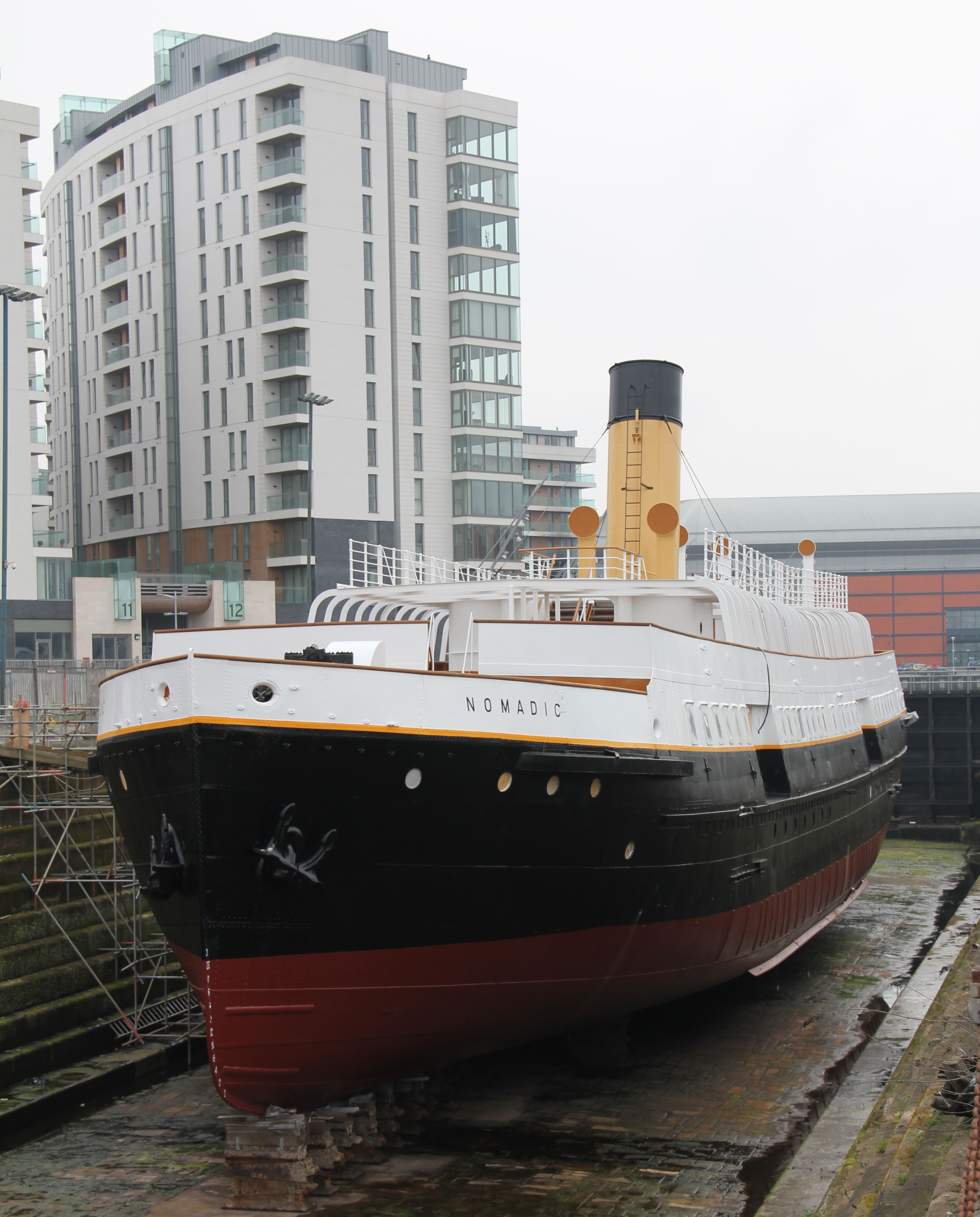
Nomadic in March 2012, in Belfast, Northern Ireland painted in full White Star colours, after the first phase of restoration.

On appointment, the NCS began essential maintenance works, fund raising and preparation for the planned restoration.

A study by Belfast City Council estimated the cost of restoring Nomadic at £7 million. The NCS has subsequently secured funding in excess of £6.5 million; major benefactors include the UK Heritage Lottery Fund, EU Peace III fund, Northern Ireland Tourist Board, Belfast City Council and Ulster Garden Villages.

In August 2008, Nomadic was considered by National Historic Ships and was entered into the National Register of Historic Vessels as part of the National Historic Fleet. This recognises Nomadic's historic significance as the register includes a list of vessels, including Cutty Sark, Mary Rose and the Royal Yacht Britannia.

In August 2009 Nomadic was moved to Hamilton Graving Dock, on Queen's Road, Belfast. This dry dock, itself a piece of maritime heritage, was partly refurbished in a joint partnership between the Belfast Harbour Commission and Titanic Quarter Ltd. The dock is believed to be where Nomadic was originally fitted out, based on surviving records, this photo and maps of the area from the era. It has now been leased as a permanent location for Nomadic.

By late 2009 the NCS had sufficient funding to begin major conservation and restoration works. In February 2010, major works commenced with external blasting and priming of the steel hull, preventing further deterioration of the steelwork.

In February 2011, Harland and Wolff were appointed by the NCS to undertake steelwork restoration and repair, rekindling a 100-year link with the ship's original builders. The value of the contract was £2 million and included re-creation of the missing bridge and flying bridge decks, hull repairs and painting of the vessel in her original White Star Line livery. These works were completed in February 2012. The ship is still not fully restored, most notably the forward mast and subsequent rigging is still missing, although it is to be installed at a later date.

The final phase of restoration works includes conservation and restoration of the luxurious interior, featuring plaster panelling and ornate joinery. Original SS Nomadic timber panelling was purchased from a French museum by the Nomadic Preservation Society, using funds raised during the Save Nomadic appeal. The panelling has since been loaned to the NCS for sympathetic restoration and reinstatement back on board the vessel. This phase of works also includes restoration works to the historic Hamilton Graving Dock and pumphouse, converting the dock area and ship into a tourist attraction.

== Lifeboats ==
As far as is known, the remaining lifeboat from Nomadic is one of the last two White Star Line lifeboats still intact in the world, the other being Lifeboat 6 from RMS Oceanic. Nomadic originally had two 20-foot (6.1 m) lifeboats, believed to have the capacity for about 28 people each when fully loaded, to serve up to 1,200 passengers and crew in an emergency. They were later supplemented by life-rafts.

Nomadic's lifeboats were removed around October 1974 after Vincent moved the ship to Paris. They lay onto the quayside opposite Nomadic for 13 years, being vandalised and having pieces stolen.

In 1987, Jean-Charles Arnault made a deal with Vincent to lend him the two lifeboats for Le Musée Maritime Chantereyne at Cherbourg. The lifeboats were left outdoors and, over time, the weight of the boats resulted in their shape collapsing, the wood itself rotting. Eventually, the museum deemed Lifeboat 1 damaged beyond rescue and in the late 1990s, they destroyed it by burning.

Then, historian Philippe Delaunoy rediscovered the remaining lifeboat. In 2007 it was purchased from the museum. To transport the lifeboat back to Belfast by lorry a special cradle was built to support the boat, and it was taken to Petticrew Marine. Over the next five years the boat hung from a cradle there and slowly returned to its original shape. At the same time funds were being raised to restore the boat, and a grant was awarded from the Heritage Lottery Fund.

With it back in its correct shape, work started on restoration, replacing missing timbers and re-fabricating missing parts. One of the stipulations from the Heritage Lottery Fund was the use of original materials. A new keel had to be made and put into place for the clinker-wood construction to connect with. When this was complete, work progressed restoring the hull, replacing missing or damaged wood with original materials. The lifeboat nameplate had been stolen, so this was reconstructed by a benefactor using archive photographs.

With the lifeboat nearing completion there was some dispute as to how it would be put on public display. Originally the Ulster Folk and Transport Museum had agreed to take it as an exhibit, but they withdrew as there was not space for it. Attempts were made to return the lifeboat to Nomadic, to be displayed alongside her in a weatherproof box, but this was unsuccessful.

By 2014, Nomadic had been structurally restored with the original paint colours. The lifeboat was displayed on the Queen Mary, in Long Beach, California near the entrance to the engine room. White Star Memories had loaned it to them, and she arrived in June 2017. In 2022, the boat was transported back to Belfast for further care.

From 8-15 September 2023, the lifeboat was briefly displayed alongside Nomadic by Maritime Belfast during the Maritime Festival.

Since its rediscovery in 2007, Nomadic's Lifeboat 2 was thought to be the last remaining White Star Line lifeboat still intact until 2016 when Lifeboat 6 from the RMS Oceanic was rediscovered and restored.

== See also ==
- SS Pontic, another White Star Line tender.
- List of tourist attractions in Ireland
