= SS Pontic =

1930 srap ship

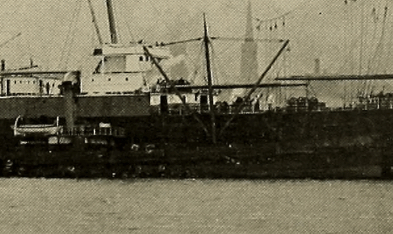
- Pontic on the Starboard side of SS Georgic

History

United Kingdom
- Name: SS Pontic
- Namesake: Pontic Greeks
- Owner: White Star Line (1894–1914); Rea Towing Co Ltd (1914–25); Beardmore, Donaldson Coal Trimmers Ltd (1925–30)
- Port of registry: (United Kingdom of Great Britain and Ireland) Liverpool, England
- Builder: Harland & Wolff, Belfast
- Yard number: 283
- Launched: 3 February 1894
- Completed: 13 April 1894
- In service: 13 April 1894
- Out of service: 1930
- Identification: UK official number 102143; Code Letters NJFK
- Fate: Sold to shipbreakers in 1930

General characteristics
- Class & type: Tender (1894–1925); Collier (1925–30)
- Tonnage: 394 GRT; 210 NRT
- Length: 150 feet 5 inches (45.85 m)
- Beam: 26 feet 1 inch (7.95 m)
- Depth: 11 feet 1 inch (3.38 m)
- Decks: 3
- Installed power: 64 bhp
- Propulsion: Triple expansion steam engine, single screw propeller
- Speed: 8 knots (15 km/h)

SS Pontic was a tender and baggage vessel of the White Star Line built by Harland & Wolff at Belfast in 1894. Originally deployed to support White Star's trans-Atlantic liners at Liverpool, she entered service as a small harbour tender in April 1894. After 25 years with White Star she was sold in 1919, continued in tender duties under private ownership, and in 1925 was converted into a collier. She was broken up for scrap on the River Clyde in 1930.

== Construction & Design ==
Pontic was laid down and built at Harland & Wolff's Belfast yard (yard number 283) and launched on 3 February 1894; she was completed and delivered on 13 April 1894. Her length was 150 ft 5 in (45.85 m), with a beam of 26 ft 1 in (7.95 m) and a depth of 11 feet & 1 inch (3.38 m). Her registered tonnage is commonly given as approximately 394–395 GRT.

She was fitted with a single-screw triple-expansion steam engine built by Harland & Wolff with cylinder diameters of 13 inch, 21 inch and 34 inch and a 24 inch stroke; the engine developed roughly 62–64 bhp and gave a service speed of about 8 knots. Her deck arrangement comprised two cargo hatches (the aft hatch served a larger aft hold), and contemporary photographs show two dorade-type vents beside her single funnel.

== Service History ==
Pontic entered service at Liverpool serving as a harbour tender and baggage vessel for White Star's larger liners, transferring baggage, stores and small numbers of passengers and crew between the quays and the liners anchored or berthed offshore.

On 3 May 1902 Pontic was involved in a collision in the Manchester Ship Canal while carrying coal; she struck the Welsh steamer Shahristan and sustained significant damage (contemporary press reports record the incident and subsequent inquiries).

On 9 October 1919 Pontic was sold by the White Star Line to Rea Towing Co Ltd of Liverpool and continued in harbour and towing/tender duties under her new owner. On 23 January 1925 she changed hands again, being sold to Beardmore Steam Ship Co Ltd and placed under the management of Beardmore Donaldson Coal Trimmers Ltd; under this ownership she was repurposed as a collier and sand-carrier, operating from Liverpool and on the Clyde trade routes.

== Fate ==
After more than three decades of service, Pontic was sold for scrap and broken up at a ship-breakers on the Clyde in 1930.

== See also ==
- SS Magnetic
- SS Traffic (1872)
