= SS Traffic (1911) =

British ship

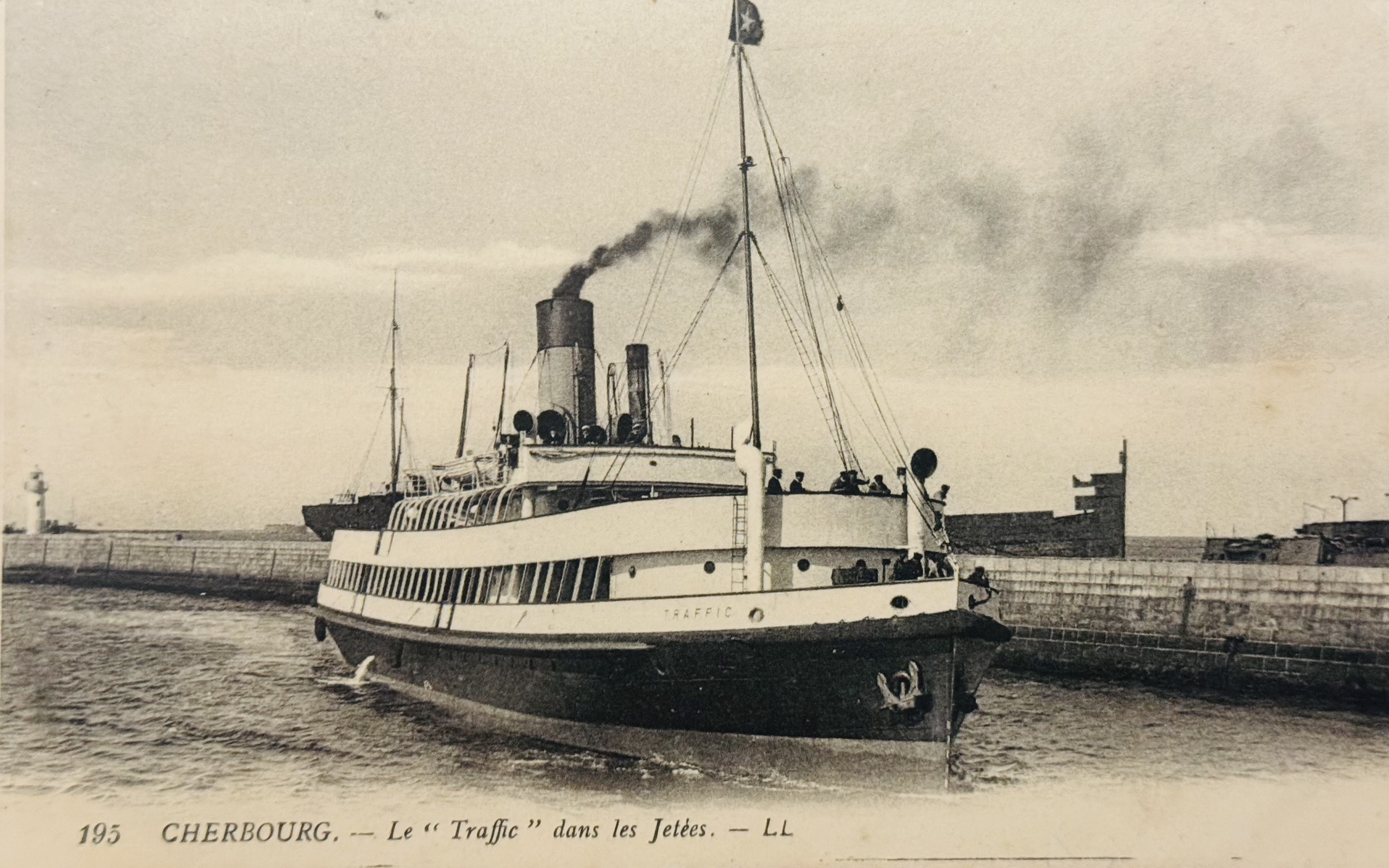

History

France
- Name: SS Traffic (1911-1934); SS Ingenieur Reibell (1934-1940)
- Owner: White Star Line (1911-1927); Société Cherbourgeoise Transbordement (1927-1934); Société Cherbourgeoise de Remorquage et de Sauvetage (1934-1940)
- Operator: White Star Line (1911-1934); Société Cherbourgeoise de Remorquage et de Sauvetage (1934-1940)
- Port of registry: Cherbourg
- Ordered: 19 July 1910
- Builder: Harland and Wolff, Belfast
- Yard number: 423
- Way number: No1
- Laid down: 22 December 1910
- Launched: 27 April 1911
- Completed: 27 May 1911
- Maiden voyage: 31 May 1911
- In service: 27 May 1911
- Fate: Torpedoed and sunk on 17 January 1941; wreck raised and scrapped later that year

General characteristics
- Tonnage: 640 GRT
- Length: 186 ft (57 m)
- Beam: 35 ft (11 m)
- Height: 14 ft (4.3 m) keel to bulkwark
- Draught: 8 ft 1 in (2.46 m)
- Decks: 5
- Installed power: 1 13 ft × 11 ft (4.0 m × 3.4 m) S.E. boiler with 3 furnaces
- Propulsion: Twin compound reciprocating powering two triple-bladed propellers.
- Speed: 9 knots (17 km/h; 10 mph)
- Capacity: 1,200 passengers and mail
- Crew: 23

SS Traffic was a tender of the White Star Line, and the fleetmate to the Nomadic. She was built for the White Star Line by Harland and Wolff, at Belfast, to serve the Olympic-class ocean liners. In Cherbourg, her role was to transport Third Class passengers and mails between the port and the liners anchored in the harbour, while the Nomadic was tasked with transporting First Class and Second Class passengers.

In April 1912, she transported immigrants from port to the Titanic, and continued to serve White Star until 1927, without interruption. During World War I, she took part in the landing of soldiers from the United States. In 1927, she was sold to the Société Cherbourgeoise Transbordement, before joining the Société Cherbourgeoise de Remorquage et de Sauvetage in 1934, which renamed her Ingenieur Reibell.

In June 1940, the French Navy scuttled Ingenieur Reibell ahead of the German advance on the port of Cherbourg. Shortly after, the Germans refloated her to convert the vessel into an escort ship. In January 1941, she was torpedoed and sunk by the British. Her wreck was salvaged and scrapped.

== Background and construction ==
At the start of the 20th century, the port of Cherbourg, France, was on the verge of becoming an essential stopover for most of the British and German ocean liners traveling between Europe and the United States. In 1907, White Star Line established a regular stop there on its newly created route between Southampton, United Kingdom and New York, United States. From 1909, the Cherbourg stopover took on a new dimension and a ferry terminal (which was not completed until 1912) was built to accommodate passengers arriving by special trains from Gare Saint-Lazare in Paris. Despite major work, however, the port posed a major problem: large liners could not dock there because of shallow water. Boarding was therefore done by means of tenders coming to meet them with passengers and luggage.

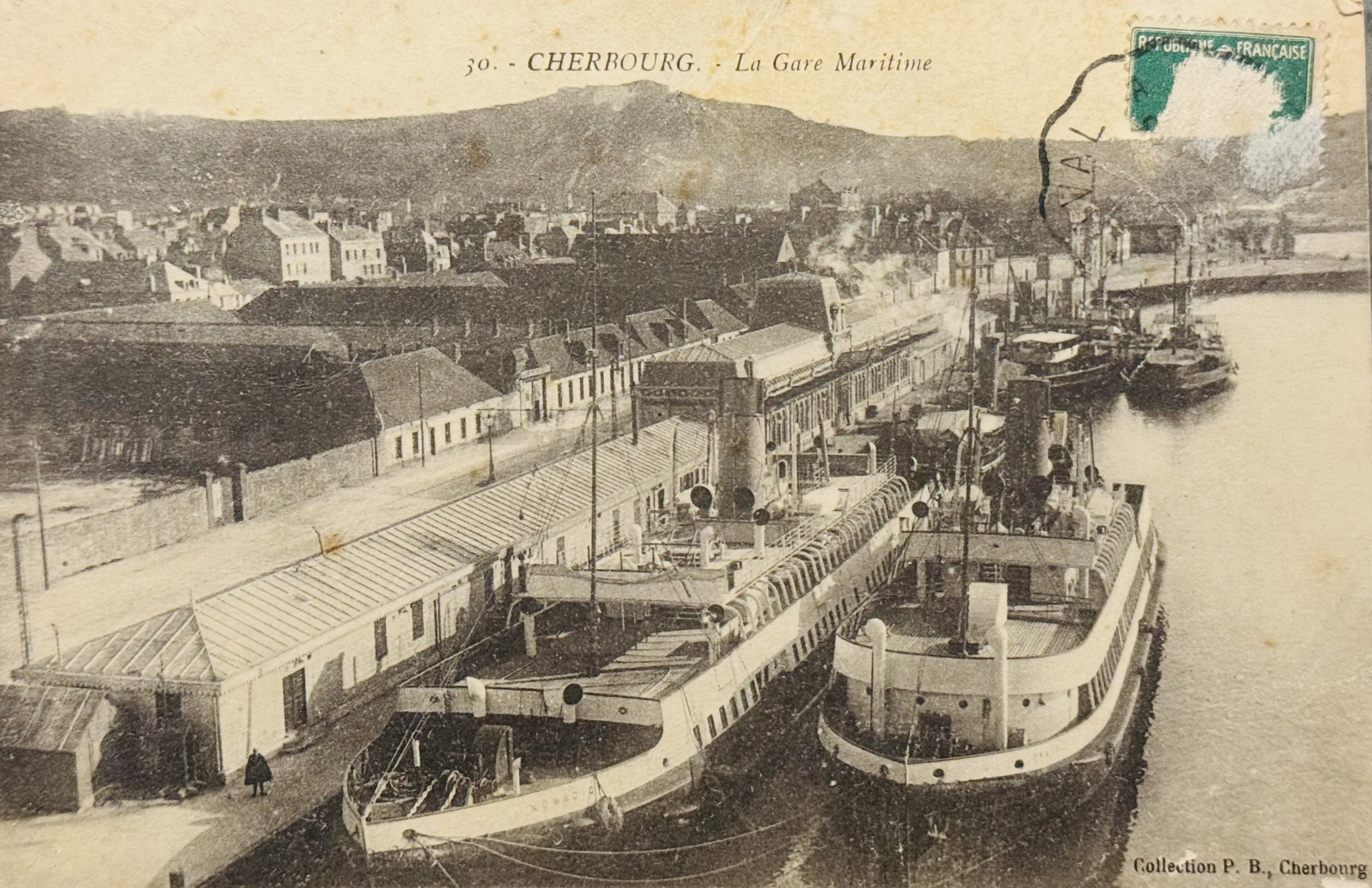
Traffic (right) seen docked at Cherbourg ferry terminal beside Nomadic (left). Note the extra open promenade along Traffic's hull that Nomadic does not have.

To this end, White Star Line recovered in 1907, an old tender, renamed the Gallic, which took care of the ferrying of passengers. However, with the arrival of its Olympic-class ships, the company was no longer satisfied with this makeshift solution. Lord Pirrie, director of Harland & Wolff yards, and his nephew Thomas Andrews conceived of two new tenders and submit the idea to Joseph Bruce Ismay, president of White Star Line. Ismay was convinced and on 25 June 1910, a little less than a year before the inaugural departure of Olympic, Order No. 422 was placed at Harland & Wolff shipyards for the tender Nomadic. Order No. 523 followed on 19 July, for the tender Traffic. While the Nomadic would be for first- and second-class passengers, the Traffic would handle third-class passengers, baggages and mails. The work was being done under the direction of the architect Roderick Chisholm and Andrews, at an accelerated pace to be ready for the maiden voyage of the Olympic, in June 1911.

Led by Thomas Andrews, the designers of Harland & Wolff designed the two tenders as miniature liners. Thus the Traffic was provided with a chamois-coloured funnel adorned with a black cuff, like all the ships of White Star Line. Her superstructure was white and the vessel had two decks that could accommodate around 1,000 people. Electric conveyors for loading mail and luggage were placed at her bow and stern. Finally, her hull was black and her keel was red. The interior facilities were comfortable and neat, the idea being that passengers should not perceive the crossing on board the Nomadic and the Traffic as a simple ferrying, but rather as the start of a journey.

Harland and Wolff laid down Traffic's keel on 22 December 1910 (yard number 423). She was built on slipway No. 1 next to her sister Nomadic and alongside Patriotic. Later the constructions of the Olympic and Titanic started, which were constructed on slipways 2 and 3, of the Arrol Gantry, respectively. Traffic was launched on 27 April 1911, two days after her running mate, Nomadic. On 18 May, the Traffic passed her sea trials. On 27 May, the Traffic was officially handed over to White Star.

== Early life serving Olympic and Titanic ==
On 31 May 1911, after her sea trials, the Olympic docked at Liverpool, United Kingdom, her home port and headquarters of the White Star Line, to be presented to the gathered crowd. It was on this same day that the Titanic was launched. The two tenders left the Olympic at the exit of Belfast Lough, at the mouth of the Lagan, to head for Cherbourg. Sailing at a maximum speed of 12 knots (22 km/h; 14 mph), they reached their destination on 3 June 1911.

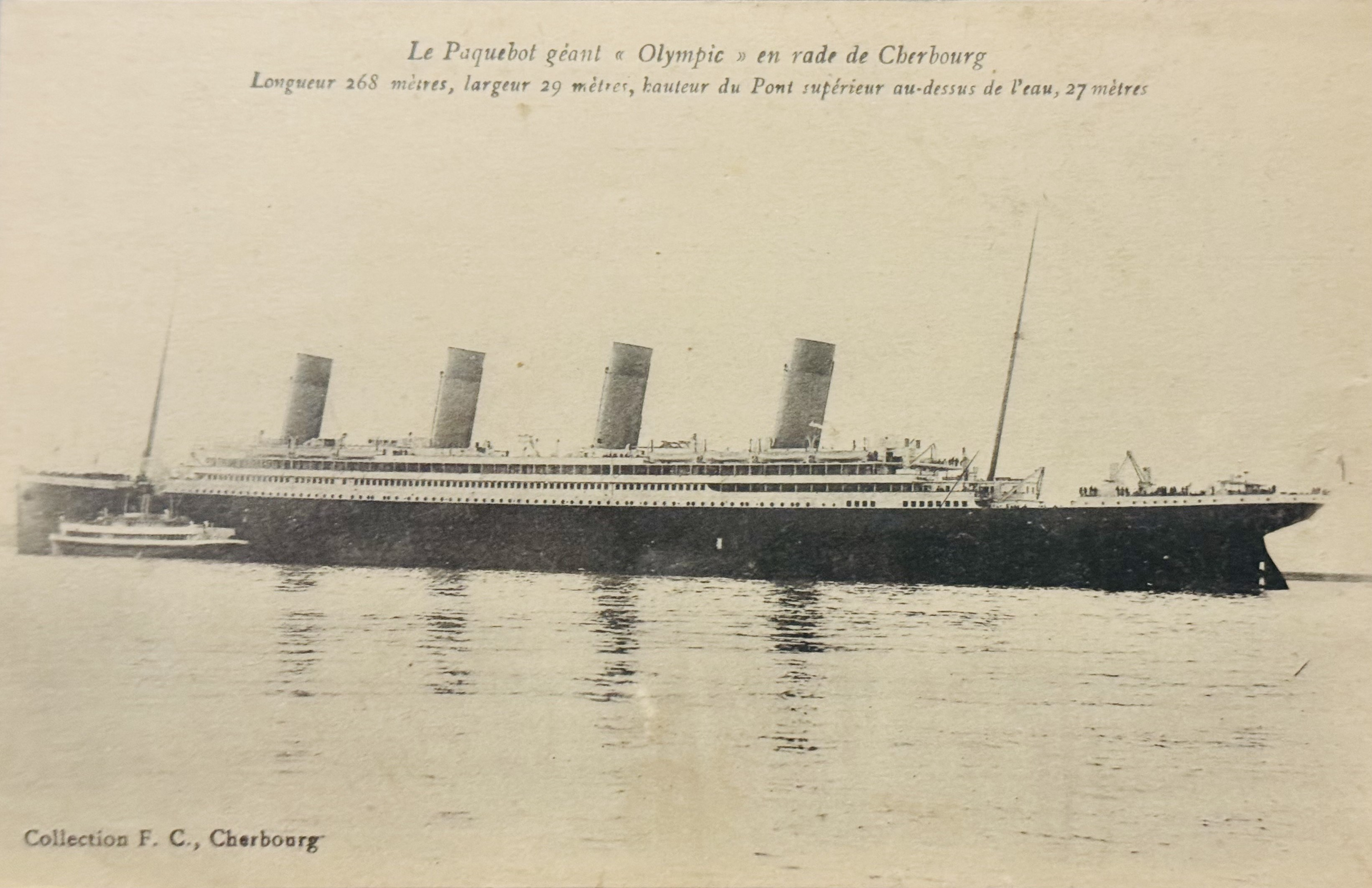
Traffic serving Olympic via the Third Class entrance located at the bow, pre-Titanic disaster

Although British-owned and flying the flag of the White Star Line, the port of registration of the Traffic was that of Cherbourg and she was operated by a French crew. This was made up of Captain Gaillard, six officers, as well as ten men assigned to the machines and the loading of the holds. The Traffic was managed by George A. Laniece, the representative of the White Star Line in Cherbourg.

The Traffic offered service for the first time when the Olympic docked at Cherbourg for its maiden voyage, on 14 June 1911. Her service on that day was not exemplary, since a number of deficiencies were noted in the transport of mail and baggage. Bruce Ismay, who was not satisfied, asked that better efforts be made for the next ferrying. However, the problems were quickly resolved and during the three other Olympic stopovers in Cherbourg between June and September, the ferrying went smoothly. In April 1912, she transported third-class passengers, mail, and baggage to the Titanic during the vessel's stopover in Cherbourg on her maiden voyage. The next day, Traffic again carried immigrants to another White Star liner, the Adriatic, which would bring Titanic survivors back to England a few days later.

A few days after the sinking of the Titanic, the Olympic made a stopover in Cherbourg where she was solemnly welcomed. The flags were at half mast, and the Nomadic and Traffic officers wore black ties as a sign of mourning. The crew of the Olympic then went on strike and refused to go back to sea until lifeboats were added to the liner. The forced immobilization of the latter paralyzed for a time the two tenders in the port of Cherbourg. The crew's request was finally satisfied and service resumed.

== Wartime and postwar ==
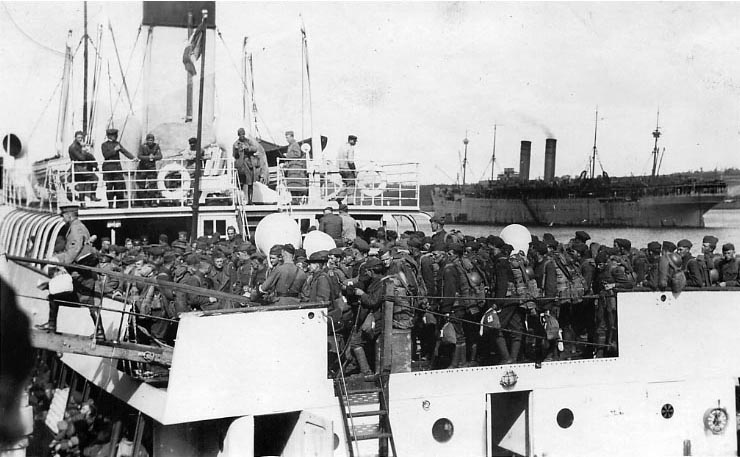
Traffic in Brest carrying allied troops, 1919

The declaration of the First World War halted transatlantic crossings. The Traffic and the Nomadic were requisitioned on 25 April 1917 by the French Navy and taken to Saint-Nazaire until 1919, to serve as auxiliary minesweepers. They carried out some ferrying missions of American troops in Brest in 1919, before their return to Cherbourg. The Traffic then resumed her functions for White Star Line, without incident until 1927. On this date, Lord Kylsant, the new owner of the company, decided to separate from the two tenders.

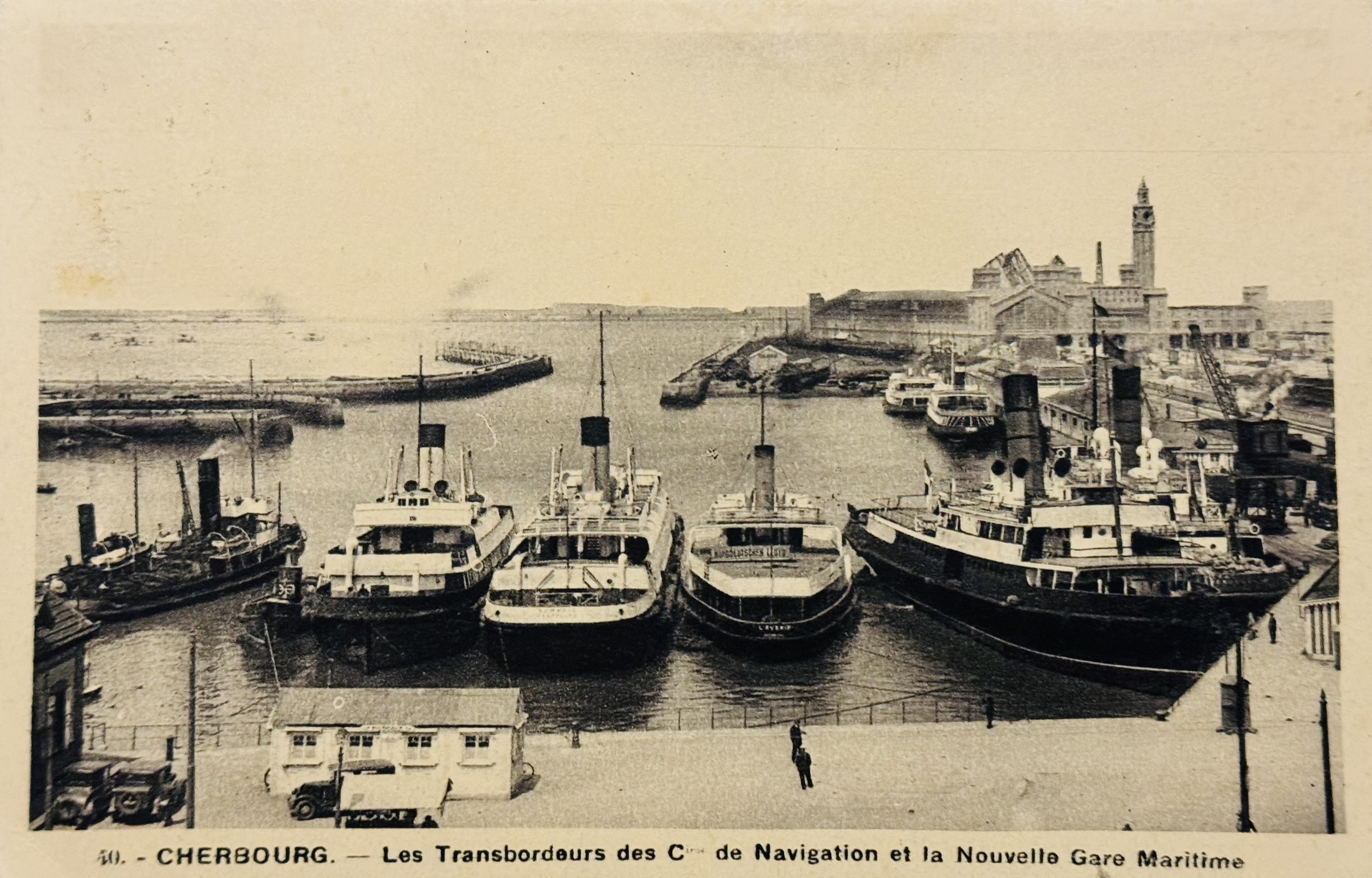
Several tenders that service Cherbourg docked with the new ferry terminal in the background. (From left): Traffic, Nomadic, North German Lloyd tender L'Avenir, and Cunard tenders Lotharingia and Alsatia.

Traffic and Nomadic were sold to Société Cherbourgeoise Transbordement in 1927, and continued to serve as tenders, but now called on any large vessels using the port. Traffic collided with RMS Homeric on 5 June 1929, and sustained some damage to the starboard side of the hull. After enquiries revealed that Traffic was notoriously difficult to handle, new propellers were produced by Harland & Wolff and fitted in October 1929. The new propellers proved effective, but Traffic was nevertheless involved in another collision in December 1929, this time involving Minnewaska of the Atlantic Transport Line. There was only minor damage. Minnewaska was involved in another collision two years later, this time with Nomadic on 29 November 1931, during which Nomadic's bow was damaged.

On 30 July 1933, Cherbourg inaugurated its new ferry terminal which now allowed liners to come to the quay. The tenders were no longer useful and thus in the following year, the Traffic was sold. Following the 1934 merger of White Star and Cunard Line, Nomadic and Traffic were sold to Société Cherbourgeoise de Remorquage et de Sauvetage, and both ships were repainted in the new livery and renamed, Traffic becoming Ingénieur Riebell and Nomadic becoming Ingénieur Minard.

== World War II, sinking and scrapping ==
In September 1939, the Ingenieur Reibell was again requisitioned by the French Navy, and this time transformed into a minelayer, registered as X23. When France capitulated and the German Army took control of the port on 17 June 1940, X23 was scuttled in the harbour to avoid capture by enemy. The ship was raised by the Germans, refurbished and used as a coastal patroller. Due to her disappointing performance in this role (for which she was not designed), she could only run 6 knots (11 km/h; 6.9 mph) . She was torpedoed and sunk by the British Royal Navy while serving in this capacity, on 17 January 1941. Afterwards, her wreck was raised again by the Germans. The damage sustained from the torpedo was beyond repair and she was scrapped at Cherbourg. Some photos of her scrapping were taken by a local man named René Leledier, who many years before had served on board as an apprentice.

== Bibliography ==
- Chirnside, Mark (2004). The Olympic-class ships: Olympic, Titanic, Britannic. Tempus. ISBN 0-7524-2868-3.
- Codet, François; Mendez, Olivier; Dufief, Alain; Gavard-Perret, Franck (2011). Les Français du Titanic (in French). Rennes: Marine Editions. ISBN 978-2-35743-065-5.
- Delaunoy, Philippe (2015). Nomadic at war. Nomadic Preservation Society.
- Piouffre, Gérard (2009). Le Titanic ne répond plus (in French). Paris: Larousse. ISBN 978-2-03-584196-4.
