= List of people from La Crosse =

The following list includes notable people who were born in or have lived in La Crosse, Wisconsin.

== Academics ==
- Donald J. Berthrong, historian
- Ruth Boynton, physician and educator
- Robert M. Dammon, professor and academic administrator
- David Garbers, scientist
- Edward R. Hauser, animal scientist
- William Duncan MacMillan, mathematician and astronomer
- Curt Michel, NASA astronaut, professor
- Louis Hermann Pammel, botanist
- Walter Ristow, librarian
- John O. Schwenn, psychologist and academic administrator
- William A. Thompson, engineer
- Blanche Wilkins Williams, educator of deaf students

== Activists and journalists ==
- Harriet Bossnot, social and civic worker
- Chris Bury, Nightline correspondent
- James Cameron, civil rights activist
- Tom Hanneman, sports broadcaster
- Mark Kellogg, reporter (killed at the Battle of the Little Bighorn)
- Frieda S. Miller, labor and women's rights activist
- William Mullen, journalist
- Charles M. Palmer, organizer of the Associated Press
- Marcus M. Pomeroy, editor of the La Crosse Democrat newspaper during the Civil War
- George Edwin Taylor, activist and journalist
- Dave Umhoefer, Pulitzer Prize-winning journalist

== Artists and performers ==
- Erik Call, cinematographer
- Bernard Joseph Dockendorff, architect
- Chip Dunham, cartoonist
- Mattie Gunterman, photographer
- Frederick Heath, architect
- Joseph Losey, film and theater director
- Christy Oates, woodworker and furniture designer
- Elmer Petersen, sculptor
- Nicholas Ray, film and theater director
- John W. Ross, architect

=== Actors ===
- Lottie Alter, actor
- Val Bettin, actor
- Charles Dierkop, actor
- Brandon Ratcliff, actor
- Ford Sterling, actor

=== Authors ===
- Sylvester John Hemleben, poet, writer, and academic
- Karla Huston, poet
- Peg Kehret, author
- E. E. Knight, author
- Helen Adelia Manville, poet and litterateur
- Marion Manville Pope, poet and author
- William Stobb, poet
- John Toland, Pulitzer Prize-winning author and historian
- Danielle Trussoni, author

=== Musicians ===
- Wallace Berry, composer and music theorist
- Hugo Jan Huss, orchestra conductor
- Stephen Jerzak, singer-songwriter, musician
- Arthur Kreutz, composer
- Robert E. Kreutz, composer
- Larry Lelli, musician
- Robert Moevs, composer
- Robert Schulz, jazz cornetist
- Freddie Slack, musician and bandleader

== Athletes ==
=== American football ===
- Gordon Bahr, college football coach
- George Dahlgren, NFL player
- John Fay, NFL player
- Kevin Fitzgerald, NFL player
- Bob Fitzke, NFL player
- Hal Hanson, NFL player
- Parker Hesse, NFL player
- Matt Joyce, NFL player
- Karl Klug, NFL player
- Richard D. Martin, college football coach
- Klinks Meyers, APFA player
- Tom Newberry, NFL all-pro offensive guard
- Jim Temp, NFL player
- Clarence Tommerson, NFL player
- Bill Vickroy, college football coach
- John Wilce, member of the College Football Hall of Fame
- Brian Wrobel, NFL player

=== Baseball ===
- John Ake, MLB player
- Paul Fitzke, MLB and NFL player
- Tony Ghelfi, MLB player
- Chuck Hockenbery, MLB player
- Tom Klawitter, MLB player
- Ed Konetchy, MLB player
- Damian Miller, MLB player
- Ed Servais, college baseball coach
- Scott Servais, MLB player and manager
- Frank Skaff, MLB player and manager
- Dolly Vanderlip, All-American Girls Professional Baseball League player
- Jarrod Washburn, MLB player
- George Williams, MLB player

=== Basketball ===
- Scott Christopherson, basketball player
- Johnny Davis, NBA player, Washington Wizards
- Jordan Davis, Wisconsin Men’s Basketball
- Bronson Koenig, basketball player
- Doug Martin, college basketball coach
- John Mengelt, NBA player
- Flip Saunders, NBA coach
- Glen Selbo, NBA player, selected second overall in 1947 NBA draft

=== Other ===
- Orville Buckner, professional boxer
- Tim Gullikson, tennis player and coach
- Tom Gullikson, tennis player and coach
- Barbara Harwerth, Olympic volleyball player
- Don Iverson, professional golfer
- Ty Loomis, volleyball player
- Eddie Murphy, Olympic medalist
- Mike Peplinski, curler
- George Poage, first African American to win an Olympic medal
- Ryan Quinn, curler

== Businesspeople ==
- George Addes, founder of United Auto Workers
- Austen Cargill, president of Cargill
- William Wallace Cargill, founder of Cargill
- Fay Marvin Clark, real estate developer
- Russell G. Cleary, president of the G. Heileman Brewing Company
- Charles Gelatt, businessman and philanthropist
- George Gund II, banker and real estate investor
- Gottlieb Heileman, founder of G. Heileman Brewing Company
- John H. MacMillan Sr, President of Cargill
- Edwin W. Rice, President of General Electric
- James Trane, co-founder of Trane
- Reuben Trane, co-founder of Trane

== Military personnel ==
- Stuart P. Baker, U.S. Navy rear admiral
- Robert J. Flynn, U.S. Navy commander
- John Shuman, Army Distinguished Service Medal recipient
- Woodrow Swancutt, U.S. Air Force major general

== Politicians ==
- Malvin R. Anderson, Minnesota state legislator and businessman
- Wendell Abraham Anderson, Chairman of the Democratic Party of Wisconsin
- Elmer E. Barlow, Wisconsin Supreme Court justice
- Reginald Bicha
- Timothy Burns, Lieutenant Governor of Wisconsin
- Erasmus D. Campbell, Lieutenant Governor of Wisconsin and Mayor of La Crosse
- Ebenezer Childs, territorial legislator
- Barbara Flynn Currie, Illinois State Representative
- Charles G. Dawes, Vice President of the United States
- George Gale, Wisconsin circuit court judge
- George A. Garrett, U.S. diplomat
- Wayne J. Hood, Executive Director of the Republican National Committee
- John Azor Kellogg, U.S. military leader and state senator
- Charles E. Knoblauch, Iowa State Representative
- Minnie C. T. Love, Colorado State Representative and member of the Women of the Ku Klux Klan
- Patrick Joseph Lucey, Governor of Wisconsin, U.S. diplomat
- Paul Lundsten, Wisconsin court of appeals judge
- Jane Magnus-Stinson, federal judge
- Paul Marcotte, businessman and Kentucky State Representative
- Thomas Morris, Lieutenant Governor of Wisconsin
- Gary K. Nelson, Attorney General of Arizona
- Mike O'Callaghan, Governor of Nevada
- Jim Omerberg, member of the West Virginia House of Delegates
- Theodore D. Parsons, New Jersey Attorney General
- George Wilbur Peck, newspaper publisher, humorist, mayor of Milwaukee, and Governor of Wisconsin
- John Rusche, Idaho State Representative
- Ellis Baker Usher, Chairman of the Democratic Party of Wisconsin
- James M. Wahl, member of the Dakota Territorial Legislature
- Julia Wallace, New Zealand politician
- Cadwallader C. Washburn, Civil War general, Wisconsin governor, and U.S. Representative
- Michael A. Wolff, Chief Justice of the Supreme Court of Missouri

=== United States legislators ===
- Charles S. Benton, U.S. Representative from New York
- Fred Biermann, U.S. Representative from Iowa
- Angus Cameron, U.S. Senator
- Frank P. Coburn, U.S. Representative
- John J. Esch, U.S. Representative
- Merlin Hull, U.S. Representative
- Ron Kind, U.S. Representative
- James T. McCleary, U.S. Representative from Minnesota
- Augustus Herman Pettibone, U.S. Representative from Tennessee
- William H. Stevenson, U.S. Representative
- Clark W. Thompson, U.S. Representative from Texas
- Gardner R. Withrow, U.S. Representative
- Gilbert Motier Woodward, U.S. Representative

=== Wisconsin state legislators ===
- Raymond Bice, Sr., businessman, State Representative and senator
- Jill Billings, State Representative
- Otto Bosshard, State Representative
- John Brindley, State Representative and La Crosse County judge
- Sylvester G. Clements, State Representative and businessman
- Elijah Fox Cook, Michigan and Wisconsin State Senator
- James Devitt, State Representative and Senator
- Steve Doyle, State Representative
- John S. Durland, State Representative
- Thomas A. Dyson, State Senator and county judge
- Edwin Flint, State Senator and circuit court judge
- Lawrence R. Gibson, State Representative
- Levi Withee Gibson, State Representative
- Gerald Greider, State Representative
- Thomas Harnisch, State Senator
- Gideon Hixon, Wisconsin State Representative and senator
- James J. Hogan, Wisconsin State Representative and Mayor of La Crosse
- Clark L. Hood, State Representative
- William Hull, State Representative
- Thomas Johnson, State Representative
- Dan Kapanke, State Senator
- Milo Knutson, mayor of La Crosse and state senator
- Edward C. Krause, State Representative
- Carl Kurtenacker, State Representative
- Donald A. McDonald, State Representative
- John Medinger, Mayor of La Crosse and State Representative
- Isaac E. Messmore, State Representative and Civil War Colonel
- Mark Meyer, State Representative and Senator
- Lewis T. Mittness, State Representative
- John Mulder, State Representative
- Leland E. Mulder, State Representative
- Henry Nein, State Representative
- Lee Nerison, State Representative
- John Oestreicher, State Representative
- Paul Offner, State Representative and Senator
- Oscar S. Paulson, State Senator
- James D. H. Peterson, State Representative
- Brad Pfaff, State Senator
- George H. Ray, State Representative
- Arnt O. Rhea, State Representative
- Theodore Rodolf, State Representative
- Rudolph Schlabach, State Representative and Senator
- Marlin Schneider, State Representative
- Jennifer Shilling, State Senator
- Albert O. Sorge, State Representative
- Gysbert Van Steenwyk, Sr., Mayor of La Crosse, State Representative and Senator
- Thomas Benton Stoddard, first mayor of La Crosse and State Representative
- Gregg Underheim, State Representative
- D. Russell Wartinbee, State Representative
- Guilford M. Wiley, State Representative
- Merrick Wing, State Senator
- Levi Withee, State Senator
- Niran Withee, State Representative

== Religious leaders ==
- Patrick Augustine, Anglican assistant bishop
- Thea Bowman, Roman Catholic religious sister and educator
- Raymond Burke, Cardinal Prefect of the Vatican's Supreme Tribunal of the Apostolic Signatura
- William P. Callahan, Roman Catholic bishop
- Kilian Caspar Flasch, Roman Catholic bishop
- Frederick William Freking, Roman Catholic bishop
- William Richard Griffin, Roman Catholic bishop
- Michael Heiss, first Roman Catholic bishop of the Diocese of La Crosse
- Alexander Joseph McGavick, Roman Catholic bishop
- John Joseph Paul, Roman Catholic bishop
- James Schwebach, Roman Catholic bishop
- John Patrick Treacy, Roman Catholic bishop

== Others ==
- Ed Gein, murderer and grave robber
- Evelyn Hartley, teenager missing since 1953
- Ken Kratz
- Scott Thorson

== See also ==
- La Crosse, Wisconsin
- List of people from Wisconsin
