= USAT Logan =

U.S. Army troopship

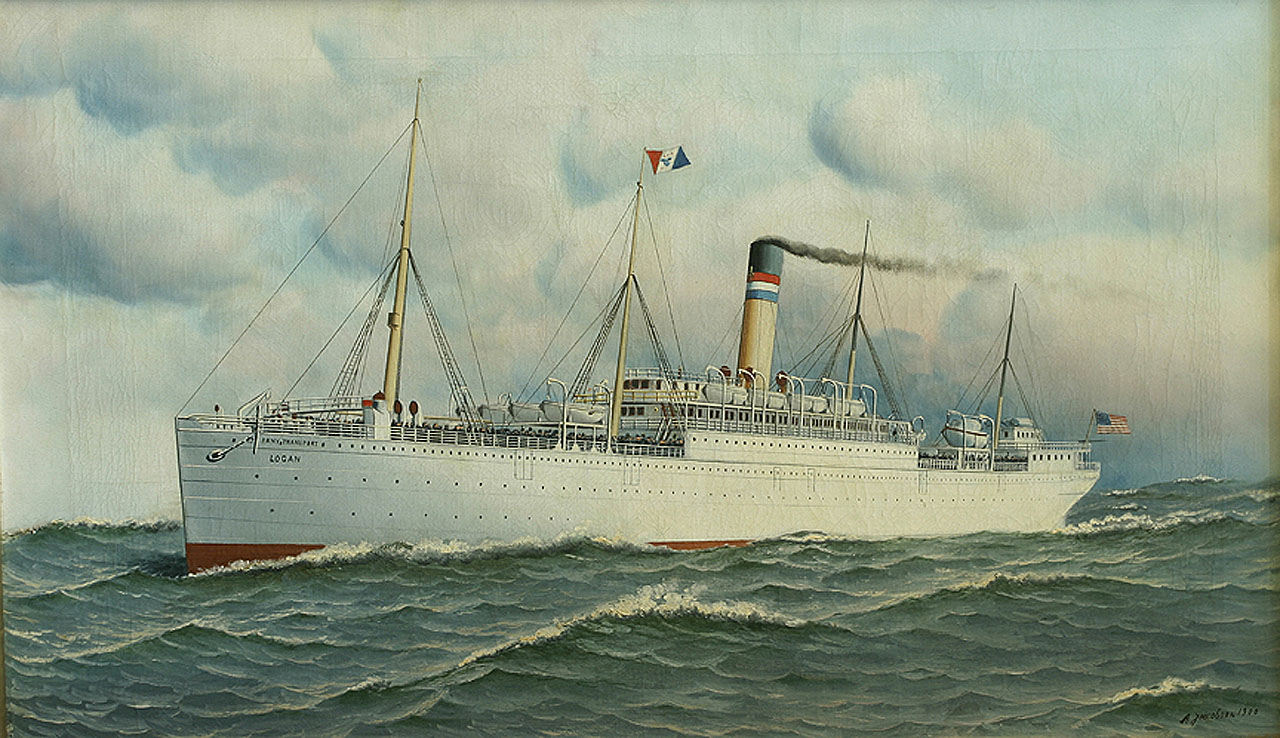
- USAT Logan

History

United Kingdom
- Name: Manitoba (1892-1898)
- Operator: Atlantic Transport Line
- Builder: Harland & Wolff, Belfast
- Launched: 28 January 1892
- Home port: London, England
- Identification: Official number 99055
- Fate: Sold for $660,000

United States
- Name: Manitoba (1898-1899); Logan (1899-1922)
- Operator: Army Transport Service
- Home port: Fort Mason, California
- Identification: Radio call sign: ATL (1907); WXF (1913)
- Fate: Sold for $180,000

United States
- Name: Logan (1922-1924)
- Owner: Candler Floating School, Inc.
- Home port: Savannah, Georgia
- Identification: Signal letters: MDVP; Official number: 222673
- Fate: Broken up 1924

General characteristics
- Tonnage: 5,672 Gross registered tons; 3,653 Net registered tons
- Displacement: 7,519 tons
- Length: 445.5 ft (135.8 m)
- Beam: 49 ft 3 in (15.01 m)
- Draft: 24 ft (7.3 m)
- Depth of hold: 30 ft (9.1 m)
- Decks: 5
- Installed power: 1,200 horsepower
- Propulsion: 2 x triple-expansion steam engines
- Speed: 13.5 knots

The steamship Manitoba was steel-hulled freighter built for the Atlantic Transport Line in 1892. She carried live cattle and frozen beef from the United States to England until the advent of the Spanish-American War. In 1898 she was purchased by the United States Army for use as an ocean-going troopship. During the Spanish-American War she carried troops and supplies between the U.S. mainland, Cuba, and Puerto Rico.

After the war, she was renamed USAT Logan and was fitted for service in the Pacific, supporting U.S. bases in Hawaii, Guam, and the Philippines. In addition to her regular supply missions, she transported American troops to virtually every conflict in the Pacific for two decades, including the Boxer Rebellion, the Philippine Insurrection, the 1911 Revolution in China, and the Siberian Intervention of World War I. Her last sailing in government service was in November 1922.

Logan was sold to private interests which intended to convert her into a seagoing school. The cost of refurbishing the thirty-year-old ship proved prohibitive, however, and she was scrapped in 1924.

== Construction and characteristics ==
The Atlantic Transport Line commissioned four sisterships to be built by the Harland and Wolff Shipyard in Belfast, Northern Ireland. They were, in order of launch, Massachusetts, Manitoba, Mohawk, and Mobile.

Manitoba's hull was built of steel plates. She was 445.5 feet (135.8 m) long, with a beam of 49.2 feet (15.0 m) and a depth of hold of 30 feet (9.1 m). Her gross register tonnage was 5,672, and her net register tonnage was 3,653. Her fully loaded draft was just under 24 feet (7.3 m). She displaced 7,519 tons.

She was driven by two propellers. These were turned by two triple-expansion steam engines which were also built by Harland and Wolff. They had high, medium, and low-pressure cylinders with diameters of 22.5 inches, 36.5 inches, and 60 inches, respectively, with a stroke of 48 inches. Each of the engines was rated at 600 horsepower. Steam was provided by two coal-fired boilers. At full speed, the ship would burn 60 tons of coal a day. Manitoba's coal bunkers could hold 900 tons.

Manitoba's cargo capacity was built primarily to support the shipment of American beef to England, both in the form of live cattle and refrigerated dressed beef. She was fitted out to transport 1,000 live cattle, and could carry 1,000 tons of fresh meat in her refrigerated holds. She was also fitted with a salon and first-class cabins for 80 passengers. There was no accommodation for steerage passengers.

Manitoba was launched from the Harland and Wolff shipyard on Queen's Island on 28 January 1892.

== Atlantic Transport Line Service (1892–1898) ==
While the Atlantic Transport Line was controlled by American shipping magnate Bernard N. Baker, its operations were run from Britain. Manitoba's home port was London and she was registered as a British ship. During her six-year career with Atlantic Transport Line she was assigned to the New York to London route.

Manitoba proved exceptionally capable at moving cattle across the Atlantic. In the first half of 1892, on her first few crossings, she brought 770 cattle to England and only two died en route. Since horses could be shipped using the same facilities as cattle, Manitoba occasionally shipped racehorses across the Atlantic, notably for August Belmont and Pierre Lorillard.

Manitoba was a fast cargo ship for her time. She left London on 23 May 1892 and arrived at her dock on the Hudson River in New York on 4 June, making the crossing in 10 days, 23 hours, and 30 minutes, the fastest recorded by a cargo ship at the time. She beat her own record in April 1893 crossing from New York to London in 10 days, 9 hours. In June 1896, Manitoba once again beat her own record for freight-carrying steamers reaching New York from London in 9 Days, 23 hours, and 20 minutes. Over the 3,240 nautical miles of her route, she averaged 13.54 knots.

== US Army Service (1898–1922) ==
=== Spanish–American War service (1898–1899) ===
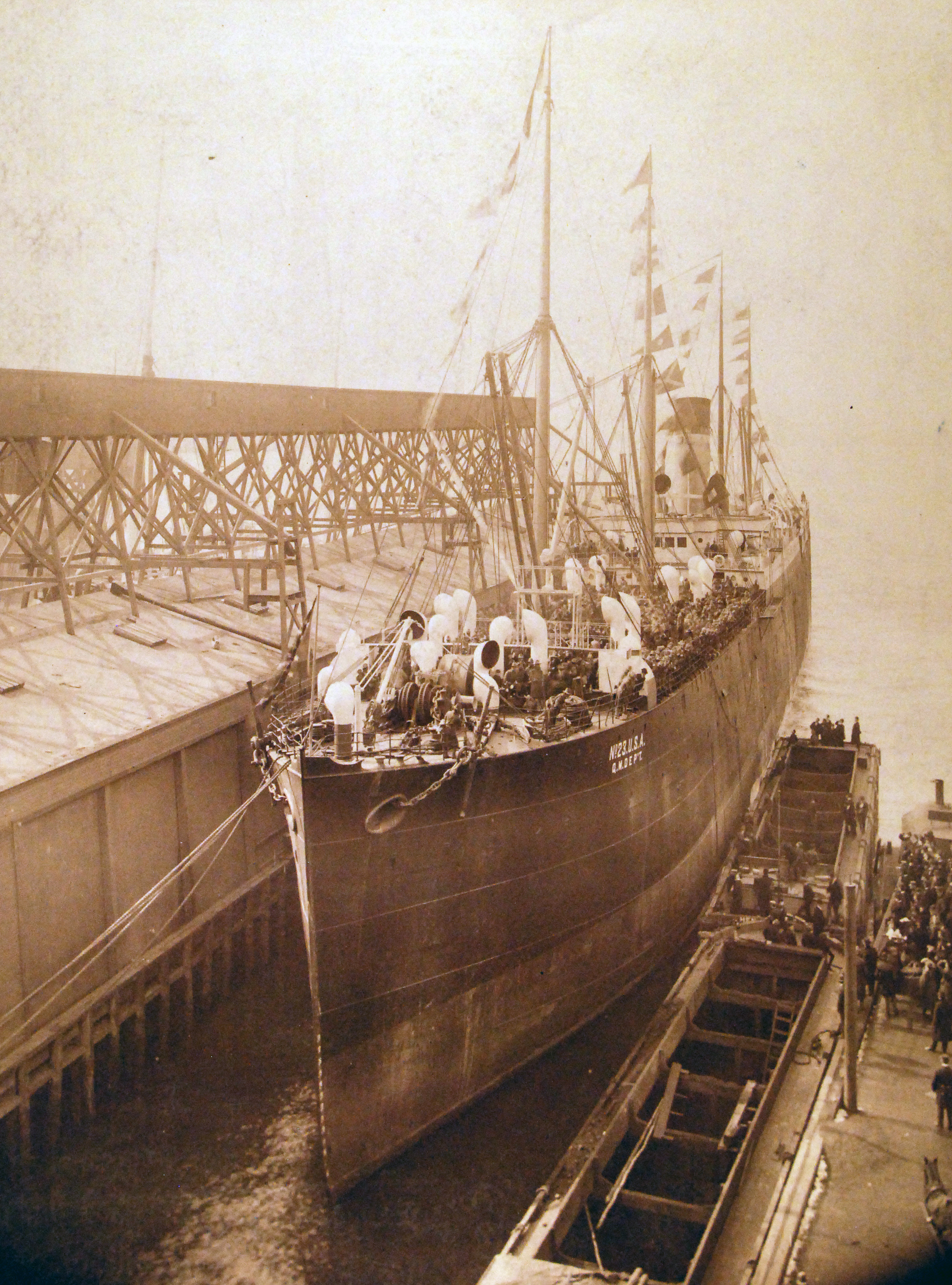
Manitoba was given the number "23" by the Army prior to renaming her Logan in 1899

On 25 April 1898, Congress declared war on Spain, beginning the Spanish-American War. An immediate objective was to defeat Spain in the Caribbean, taking Cuba and Puerto Rico. At the time, the United States had few overseas possessions, and thus its military had limited ocean-capable sealift to support such an offensive. American political leaders preferred to acquire American ships to support the war effort, rather than enrich foreigners and rely on foreign crews. There were also legal constraints on using neutral-flagged vessels in American military operations. Through some quirks in the Congressional funding of the war, the US Navy was able to charter transport ships prior to the declaration of war and tied-up the best of the American merchant fleet for its use. When the Army was able to begin acquiring ships after the declaration of war, fewer domestic options remained. While the Atlantic Transport Line was British-flagged, it was American owned, making it a more attractive option.

Army Colonel Frank J. Hecker approached the Atlantic Transport Line to charter its fleet, and was refused. He then offered to buy the vessels he sought and a deal was struck, subject to the approval of the Secretary of War Russel Alger. In addition to Manitoba, the Atlantic Transport Line sold Massachusetts, Mohawk, Mobile, Michigan, Mississippi, and Minnewaska. These ships were placed under the Quartermaster's Department of the United States Army. The Army reckoned Manitoba's capacity to be 80 officers, 1,000 men, and 1,000 horses. Manitoba was purchased on 20 July 1898. The price of the ship was $660,000.

The ship underwent little conversion for military use and began embarking troops just two weeks after her purchase. By that time the fighting was all but over. Hostilities ceased on 12 August 1898. Even though the war was over, the Army faced substantial logistical challenges. It had to garrison the new possessions, and return the men temporarily mobilized for the offensive. Manitoba moved thousands of troops and animals to and from Cuba and Puerto Rico in the immediate post-war period.

Manitoba/Logan troop movements to and from the Caribbean
Departure	From	To	Arrival	Units embarked
6 August 1898	Newport News	Ponce	12 August 1898	Batteries A & C Pennsylvania Light Artillery Sheridan's & Governor's Troops Pennsylvania Cavalry
7 September 1898	Ponce	New York	13 September 1898	6th Illinois Volunteer Infantry (1,203 officers and men) Battery A Illinois Light Artillery (159 officers and men)
11 October 1898	Newport, R.I.	Ponce	16 October 1898	47th New York Volunteer Infantry
21 October 1898	Ponce	New York	26 October 1898	two battalions 3rd Wisconsin Infantry
13 November 1898	Savannah	Nuevitas		6 troops 8th US Cavalry
1 December 1898	Savannah	Casilda	7 December 1898	4th Tennessee Volunteer Infantry
22 January 1899	Savannah	Havana		6 troops 7th US Cavalry
3 February 1899	Savannah	Matanzas		6 troops 2nd US Cavalry
16 February 1899	Savanah	Matanzas		6 troops 2nd US Cavalry
25 March 1899	Nuevitas	Savannah	27 March 1899	3rd Georgia Volunteer Infantry (988 officers and men)
29 March 1899	Havana	Savannah	2 April 1899	161st Indian Volunteer Infantry (1,196 officers and men)
7 April 1899	Havana	Savannah	13 April 1899	3rd Nebraska Volunteer Infantry
2 May 1899	Galveston	Santiago		6 troops 10th US Cavalry
17 May 1899	Galveston	Manzanillo		6 troops 10th US Cavalry
25 May 1899	Gibara	New York	29 May 1899	2nd US Volunteer Infantry (683 officers and men)
23 June 1899	Ponce	New York	27 June 1899	Battery B 5th US Artillery Batteries E, H 7th US Artillery (536 officers and men, 343 mules, 240 horses)

=== Preparation for Pacific service (1899–1900) ===
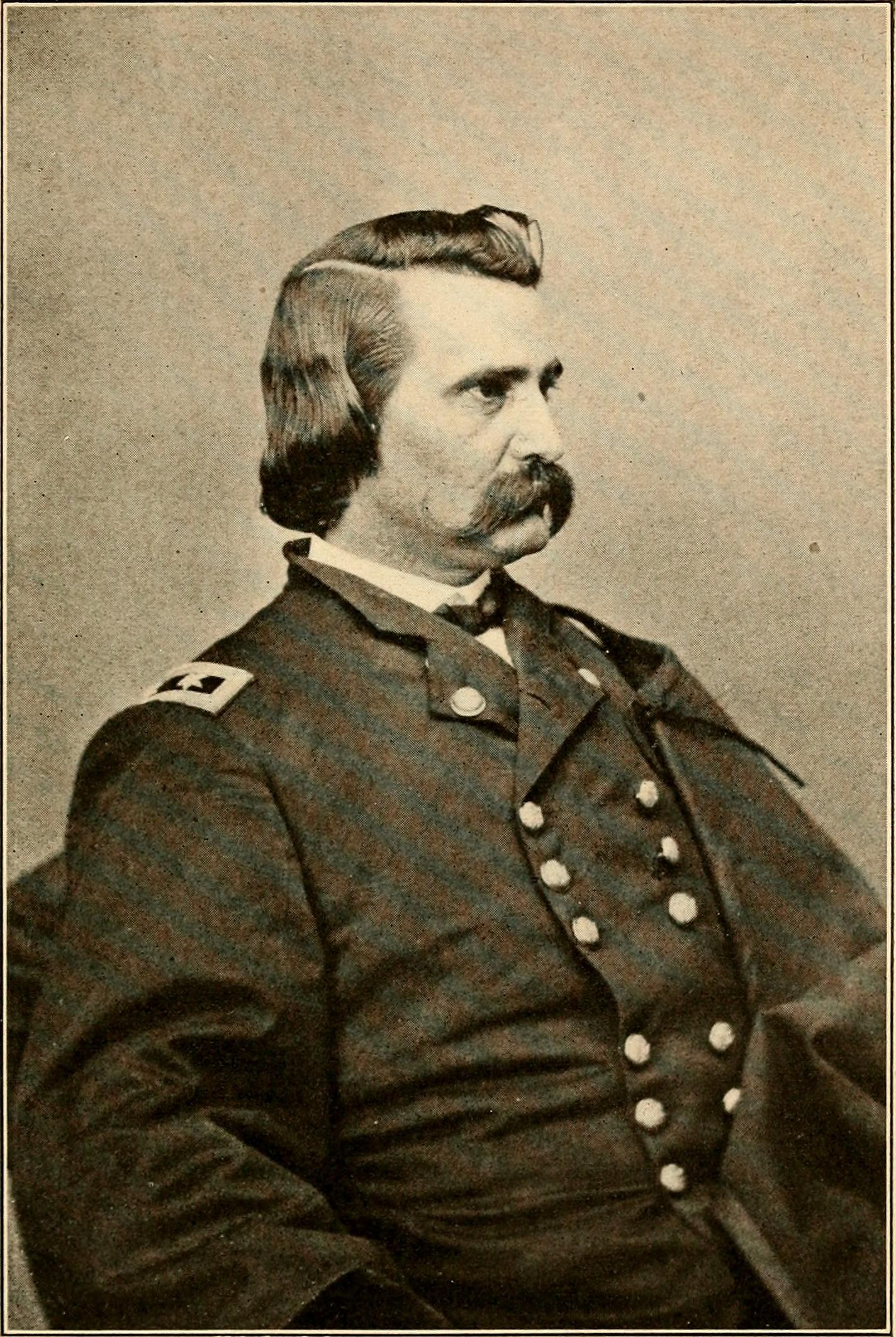
General John A. Logan in 1862, USAT Logan's namesake

Having taken Cuba, Puerto Rico, Guam, and the Philippines, the Army had a permanent need for transport to overseas bases. The annexation of Hawaii in 1898 also required new ocean transport. The Army Transport Service chose the best vessels acquired during the war to become a permanent sealift capability. Manitoba and her three sister ships were retained for this purpose. To mark their transition to permanent military service, they were renamed in March 1899. Manitoba became United States Army Transport Logan, named for Civil War General John A. Logan.

Once the Army completed the bulk of the troop movements in the Caribbean at the end of the war, it refit Logan for service in the Pacific. In July 1899 a contract was given to the Morse Iron Works of New York to repair and refit the ship. The contract price for the work was $230,000. When she emerged from the shipyard she had a new steam-powered steering system. As equipped for her Pacific service, she could accommodate 1,650 soldiers sleeping in three-tier canvas berths suspended from steel posts. Her coal bunkers were enlarged to hold 1,780 tons. She had fourteen fresh water tanks with 1,270 tons capacity. Her refrigerated space of 20,580 cubic feet was kept at 18 degrees Fahrenheit. The ship was also equipped with a vault for gold and silver in order to fund overseas operations. During her December 1900 sailing, for example, she carried $1.3 million to pay the troops in the Philippines. A sea trial for the improved Logan took place on 13 November 1899.

As configured for her Pacific service Logan's authorized complement was 13 officers and 172 crew. As she sailed, her crew was typically between 175 and 200 officers and men.

On 20 November 1899 Logan sailed from New York, bound for Manila, via the Suez Canal. She had a full load, including 1,312 officers and men of the 41st Volunteer Infantry regiment. She stopped at Gibralter for water in December 1899. She reached Singapore on 2 January 1900, and Manila on 5 January. After disembarking her troops in Manila, she sailed to San Francisco, via Nagasaki, with 19 passengers aboard. She arrived at her new home port on 10 February 1900.

=== Boxer Rebellion and Philippine Insurrection (1900–1901) ===
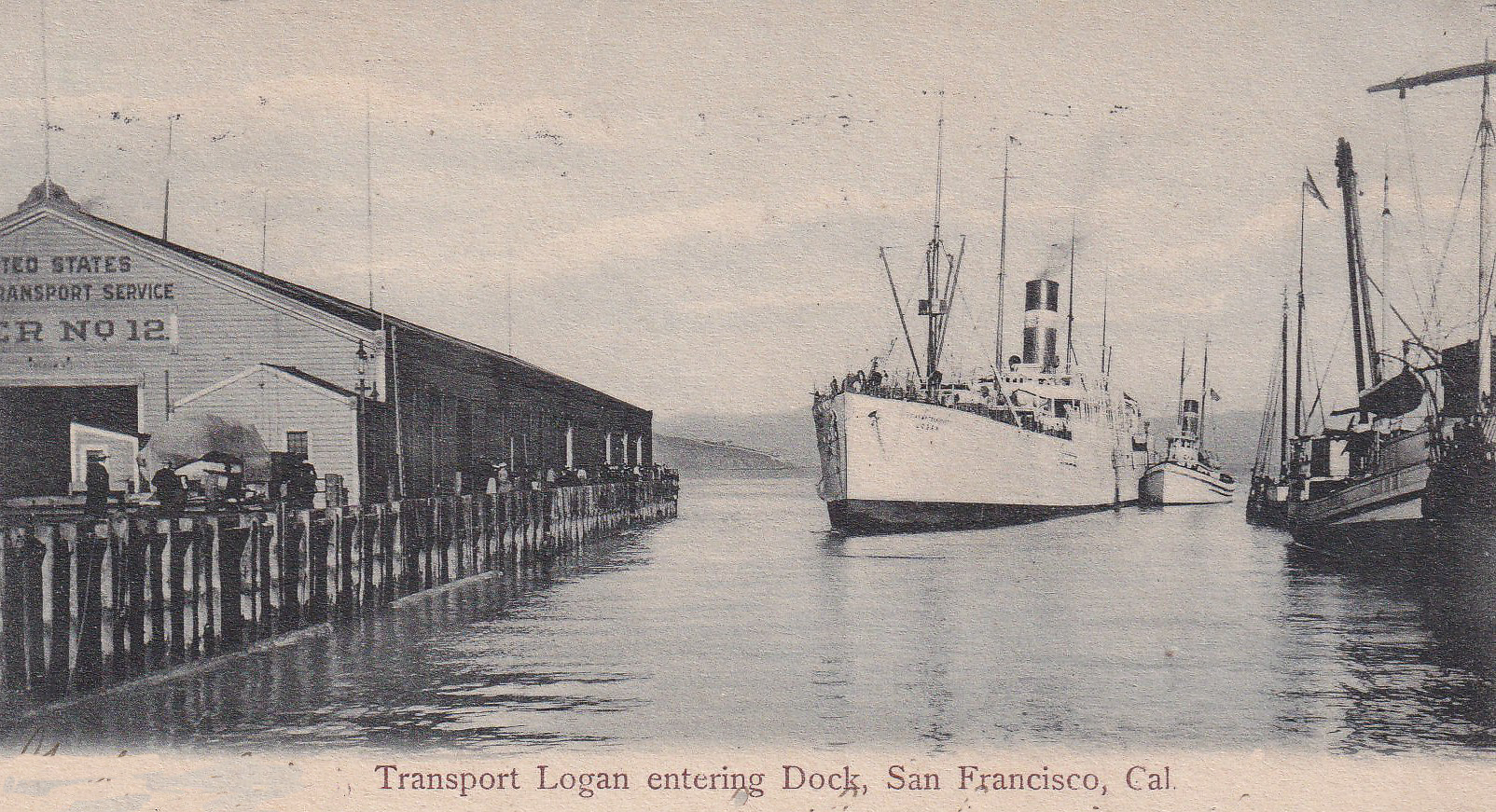
Logan mooring at Pier 12, San Francisco, circa 1905

After a brief shipyard visit, she sailed again for Manila on 16 May 1900. By the time she reached the Philippines, the Boxer Rebellion had come to a critical point. The War Department instructed General Arthur MacArthur Jr., Military Governor of the Philippines, to hold Logan for possible intervention in China. The U.S. 9th Infantry Regiment was embarked on Logan at Manila. The ship carried 32 officers and 1,230 men. The regiment's baggage, horses, wagons sailed on Port Albert. After a stop for coal and water at Nagasaki, Logan landed the troops at Taku, China on 8 July 1900. On her return trip, Logan evacuated sick and wounded soldiers, Christian missionaries, and other refugees. She arrived back in San Francisco from Manila, via Nagasaki and Yokohama, on 6 August 1900.

Logan began a regular shuttle service between San Francisco, Honolulu, Guam, and Manila. The Army Transport Service maintained a roughly monthly schedule of sailings from San Francisco using Logan, USAT Sheridan, USAT Sherman, and USAT Thomas. The ships carried supplies, cash, and fresh troops to the Philippines to fight insurgents, and relieved, discharged, wounded, and dead troops back to the United States. Many officers brought their wives and children aboard as cabin passengers. Details of Logan's trans-Pacific trips during this period are shown in the table below.

Logan trans-Pacific trips 1900–1901
Departure	From	To	Arrival	Units Embarked
1 September 1900	San Francisco	Manila	2 October 1900	2 battalions, 1st Infantry Regiment 1 battalion, 2nd Infantry Regiment
16 October 1900	Manila	San Francisco	15 November 1900	283 invalided troops 39 prisoners
16 December 1900	San Francisco	Manila	11 January 1901	124 recruits and other troops
1 March 1901	Manila	San Francisco	29 March 1901	33rd Volunteer Infantry Regiment (795 men) 34th Volunteer Infantry Regiment (806 men)
15 April 1901	San Francisco	Manila	14 May 1901	2 companies 1st Infantry Regiment 3rd squadron 9th Cavalry Regiment 2nd squadron 10th Cavalry Regiment 1 battalion 11th Infantry Regiment
31 May 1901	Manila	San Francisco	25 June 1901	44th Volunteer Infantry Regiment 2 battalions 38th Volunteer Infantry Regiment

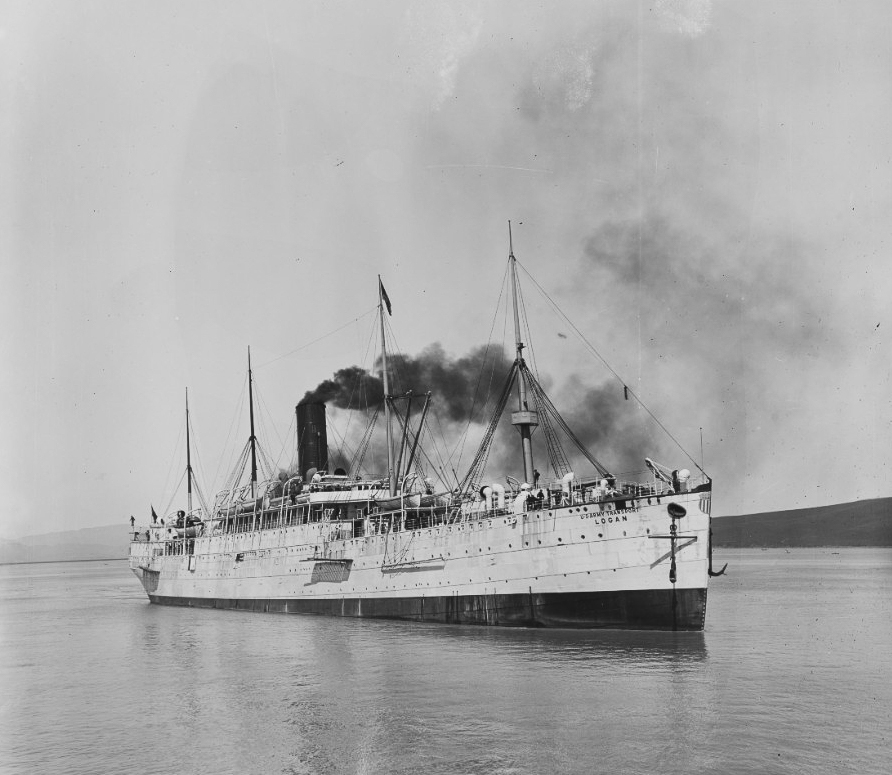
Logan at Mare Island in April 1902 for boiler and furnace replacement

=== Pacific service (1901–1918) ===
In mid-1901 Logan went to the Mare Island Naval Shipyard to replace her boilers and furnaces. Her first sailing after this extensive overhaul was on 1 May 1902. She resumed her roughly once a month Pacific crossings. In 1905 the ship hosted Secretary of War William Howard Taft and a congressional delegation on a tour of the Philippines, with a side trip to Hong Kong.

Logan continued her regular Pacific crossings until December 1907 when she went to the Risdon Iron Works in San Francisco for an overhaul. Budget issues caused the Army to issue two contracts for this work. The first was for $85,000. Just as these repairs were completed, the Army issued another bid request for additional work. This contract, too, was awarded to Risdon. The cost of this second phase was $275,271. During this repair cycle an electrical system was installed on the ship. This work included the installation of a 3 kilowatt radio transmitter. She is recorded to have the wireless call sign "ATL", which was changed to "WXF" by 1913. Logan returned to her San Francisco-Manila route in March 1909.

In May 1911, Logan was pulled out of service briefly for electrical upgrades and other maintenance. She was rushed back into commission in order to return troops from the Mexican border which had been sent there in response to possible instability arising from the Mexican Revolution. She transported the 8th Infantry Regiment from San Diego to its regular posts at Monterey and the Presidio in June 1911. She then returned to her regular Manila route. Logan was the first Army transport to land at the newly constructed pier at Fort Mason in November 1911.

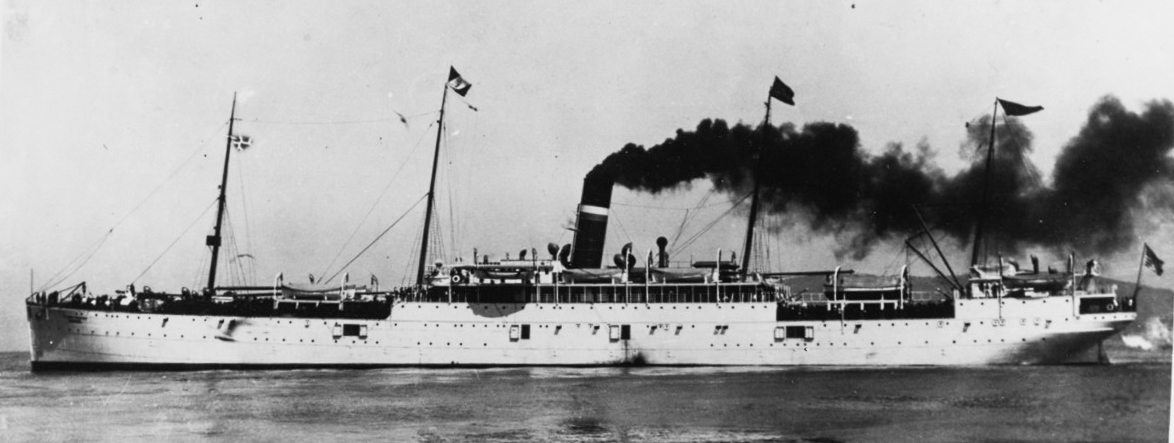
USAT Logan, c.1913

On 12 January 1912, Logan embarked a battalion of the 15th Infantry regiment at Manila. She landed the troops, and their attached horses, mules, armaments and supplies at Qinhuangdao, China in order to protect the railway between Beijing and the coast. This line of retreat for American and other foreign nationals was threatened by warring factions in the 1911 Revolution in China.

The ship then resumed her regular San Francisco-Manila route, interrupted only by brief shipyard visits. Logan had a minor modification of her route in January 1916. She sailed from San Francisco to the Panama Canal where she embarked the 27th Infantry Regiment, which she took to Manila.

Logan's arrivals from foreign ports were always accompanied by inspections and sometimes quarantine by local health authorities concerned with the spread of communicable diseases. On at least one occasion, these precautions failed disastrously. Logan carried the influenza pandemic to Guam in October 1918. Approximately 5% of the population died as a result of her visit.

=== Allied Expeditionary Force Siberia (1918–1920) ===
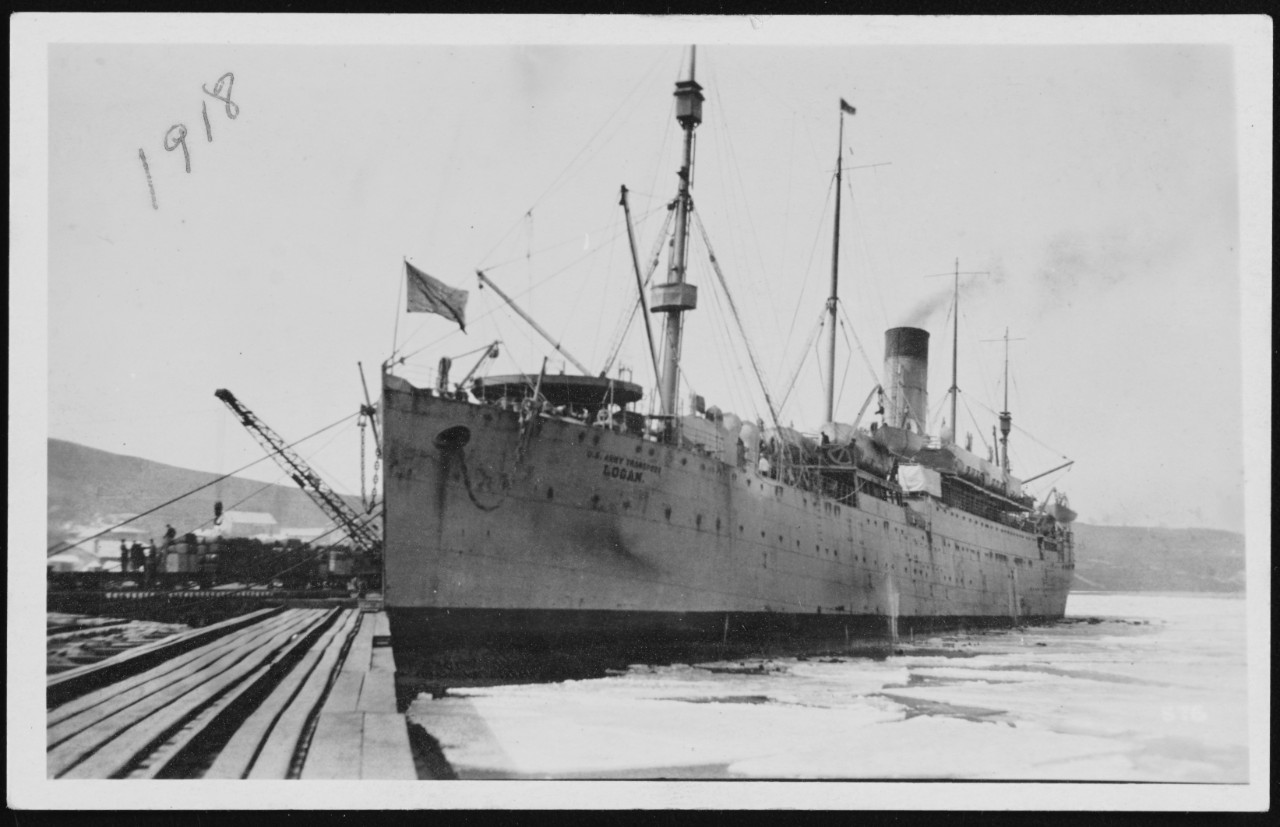
Logan in 1918, likely at Vladivostok

The revolutionary Bolshevik government of Russia made a separate peace with the Central Powers in March 1918, ending Russian participation in World War I. In July 1918, President Wilson sent U.S. troops to Siberia as part of an Allied Expeditionary Force to safeguard American interests threatened by this change. On 2 September 1918, Logan sailed for Vladivostok, Russia from San Francisco with 1,745 troops aboard. She and sister-ship USAT Sheridan reached Vladivostok on 29 September 1918. They disembarked 3,682 troops, which brought the previously landed 27th and 31st Infantry Regiments to full strength. On 4 December 1918 Logan sailed from San Francisco for Russia again, with a stop in Honolulu, where she arrived on 13 December. She unloaded 100 tons of frozen food for the troops in Hawaii. She then sailed on to Vladivostok. A serious fire broke out en route which took seven hours to bring under control, but Logan continued her voyage to Russia. She returned to San Francisco on 17 February 1919 with eleven wounded soldiers from the Siberian expedition.

Logan sailed again for Vladivostok on 25 February 1919. She returned to San Francisco on 6 May 1919 with more than 850 passengers aboard. She returned 1,278 soldiers from the 27th and 31st Infantry Regiments and 167 bodies of soldiers who had been killed in Siberia on 19 October 1919. During this period, Logan sailed a triangular route between San Francisco, Vladivostok, and Manila, with her usual intermediate stops in Hawaii, and Guam.

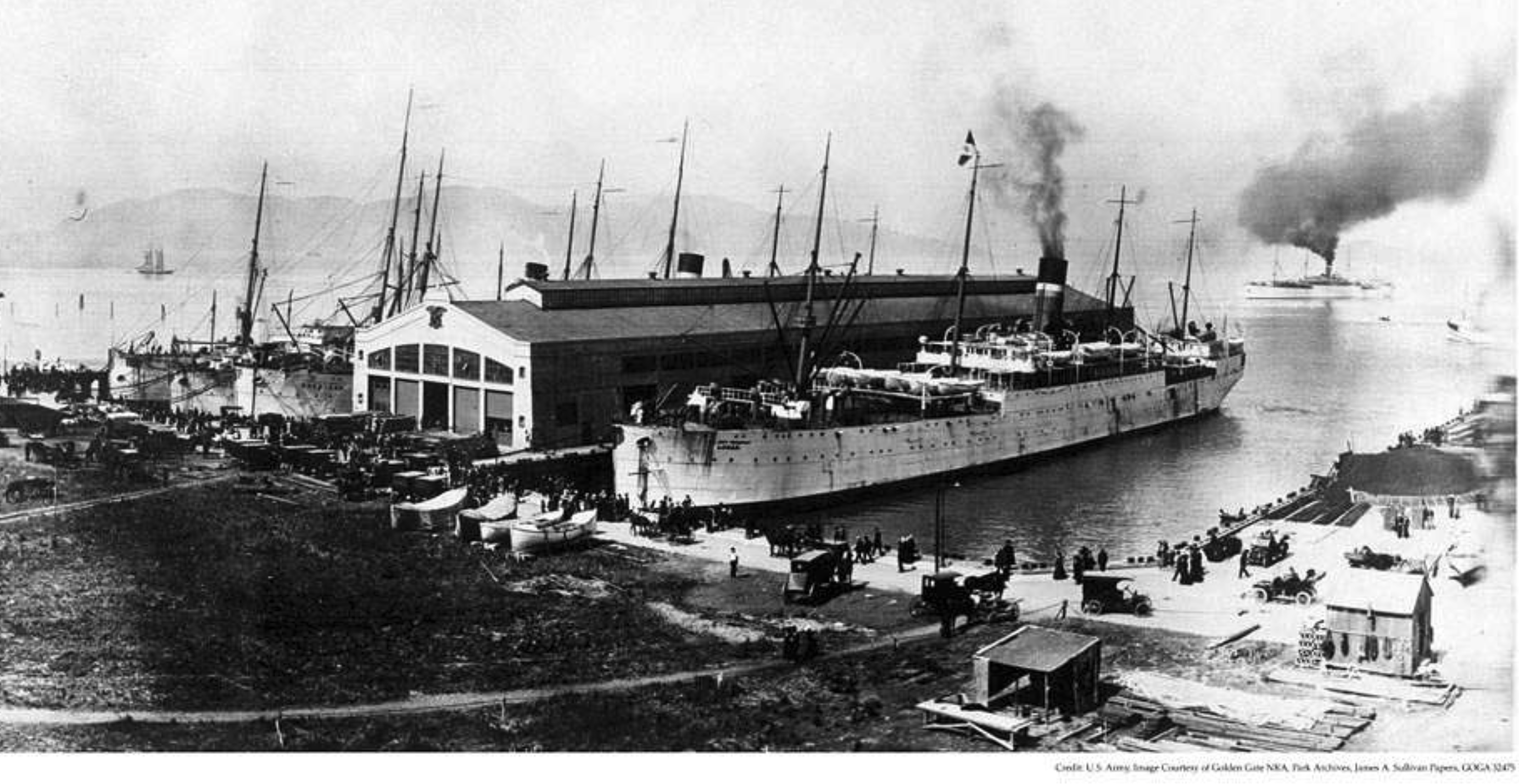
Logan moored at Fort Mason, San Francisco, circa1920

She left San Francisco for her last sailing in the Siberian Intervention on 2 June 1920. She evacuated 1,789 troops of the Czechoslovak Legion from Vladivostok to Trieste, Italy where she arrived on 28 September 1920. The trip to Vladivostok went via Honolulu and Manila. From Vladivostok she traveled via Colombo, Singapore, and the Suez Canal to reach Trieste. Logan returned to her San Francisco home port on 14 February 1921 via Gibraltar, New York, Puerto Rico, and the Panama Canal. En route she embarked elements of the 42nd Infantry Regiment in Puerto Rico and transported them to their station in the Canal Zone.

Upon her return to San Francisco, Logan resumed her regular supply runs to Honolulu, Manila, and Guam. On 12 October 1922 she sailed from Manila for the last time. She carried units of the 9th Cavalry Regiment which were returning to the United States. After her final stop in Honolulu, she returned to San Francisco on 11 November 1922 where her government service ended.

== Obsolescence, sale, and scrapping ==
In December 1920, the War Department announced its intention to sell eight Army transports, including Logan and two of her sister-ships purchased from the Atlantic Transport Line in 1898. Given the glut of more modern troopships built during World War I, it made little sense for the Army to maintain the thirty-year-old Logan. She was sold on 9 November 1922.

Candler Floating School, Inc., led by Asa G. Candler, jr., purchased Logan for $180,000. Its intent was to use the ship as a floating school for 400 boys. She would sail around the world during a single school year, mixing classroom teaching with the experience of seeing the world. The ship was to be fitted with classrooms, lounges, laboratories, a library, gymnasium, and swimming pool. There was to be a school band, orchestra, and newspaper.

Candler wanted the ship closer to his Atlanta headquarters to oversee its renovation. In order to offset the cost of repositioning Logan to the east coast, she was chartered to the Pacific Mail Steamship Company to move a cargo of California produce to New York. She made port in Los Angeles in December 1922, and discharged her cargo in New York in January 1923. Candler had her moved to Baltimore, where she arrived on 22 January 1923.

Logan was sent to Baltimore Dry Dock and Shipbuilding yard to have her hull and tail shaft inspected. Naval architect Edes Johnson completed plans for the conversion, and Candler sought bids to execute the work. The cost proved prohibitive, however, and Logan was sold to the Boston Iron and Metal Company in April 1923. The ship was scrapped at the H. C. Crook Shipbuilding Company in Baltimore in 1924.
