= Malvin (given name) =

- Gender: masculine

Other names
- Related names: Melvin, Malvina

Malvin is a given name. Notable people with the name include:

- Malvin R. Anderson (1894-1986), American businessman and politician
- Malvin Gray Johnson (1896–1934), American painter
- Malvin Kamara (born 1983), English-born Sierra Leonean footballer
- Malvin Russell Goode, (1908–1995), American television journalist and news correspondent
- Malvin Wald (1917–2008), American screenwriter

== See also ==
- Malvin (disambiguation)
