= Frank Fowler =

Frank Fowler may refer to:

- Francis George Fowler (1871–1918), sometimes Frank Fowler, English writer on English language, grammar and usage
- Frank Fowler (artist) (1852–1910), American painter
- Frank Fowler (writer) (1833–1863), English writer
- Frank Oliver Fowler (1861–1945), Manitoba, Canada, politician
- Frank H. Fowler (1861–1944), American educator and politician
- Frank Fowler (rugby union)

== See also ==
- Francis Fowler (disambiguation)
