= William M. Dennis =

American businessman and politician

2nd Bank Comptroller of Wisconsin
- In office January 2, 1854 – January 4, 1858
- Governor: William A. Barstow; Arthur MacArthur Sr. Coles Bashford
- Preceded by: James S. Baker
- Succeeded by: Joel C. Squires

7th & 10th Mayor of Watertown, Wisconsin
- In office April 1866 – April 1867
- Preceded by: Robert Howell
- Succeeded by: Henry Mulberger
- In office April 1862 – April 1863
- Preceded by: Myron B. Williams
- Succeeded by: Joseph Lindon

Member of the Wisconsin Senate from the 10th district
- In office June 5, 1848 – January 7, 1850
- Preceded by: Position established
- Succeeded by: James Giddings

Member of the Wisconsin State Assembly from the Dodge 3rd district
- In office January 3, 1853 – January 2, 1854
- Preceded by: Maximilian Averbeck
- Succeeded by: Francis McCormick

Personal details
- Born: January 18, 1810 Newport County, Rhode Island, U.S.
- Died: July 18, 1882 (aged 72) Watertown, Wisconsin, U.S.
- Resting place: Whiteside Church Cemetery, Cambridge, New York
- Party: Democratic
- Spouses: 1st wife; Catherine Elizabeth Coughlin
- Children: with 1st wife; Mary Elizabeth (McMahon)^{(b. 1843; died 1907)}; with Catherine Coughlin; Samuel Jarvis Dennis^{(b. 1857; died 1932)}; Edward M. Dennis^{(b. 1860; died 1927)}; William Miller Dennis II^{(b. 1866; died 1918)}; (Mrs. John Duffy)^{(died after 1882)}

William Miller Dennis I (January 18, 1810 – July 18, 1882) was an American businessman, Democratic politician, and Wisconsin pioneer. He served in the first session of the Wisconsin State Senate and later served in the State Assembly, representing Dodge County. He was also the 2nd bank comptroller of Wisconsin, and was the 7th and 10th mayor of Watertown, Wisconsin.

== Biography ==
William M. Dennis was born in Newport County, Rhode Island, in January 1810. At a young age, he moved to Troy, New York. He subsequently moved to the Wisconsin Territory in 1837.

He was one of the earliest settlers in what is now Watertown, Wisconsin, and remained there for the rest of his life. Shortly after his arrival, he was named as the first postmaster in that town.

Politically, Dennis associated with the Democratic Party, which was dominant in the state during these year. He was elected to the last session of the 4th Wisconsin Territorial Assembly, serving in the Territory's House of Representatives in 1846. That same year, he was elected as a delegate for Dodge County to Wisconsin's first constitutional convention. The constitutional document produced by this convention was ultimately rejected by voters, but a subsequent effort secured Wisconsin statehood in 1848. That February, Dennis was elected from Dodge County to represent them in the first session of the Wisconsin State Senate.

In 1852, he was elected to the Wisconsin State Assembly, representing Dodge County's 3rd Assembly district in the 6th Wisconsin Legislature. His district comprised the southeast corner of the county. That Fall, he was the Democratic nominee for the statewide elected position of state bank comptroller. He was the first person elected to this office (the previous holder was appointed by the Governor). He was re-elected in 1855.

Subsequently, Dennis became president of the Wisconsin National Bank and was elected to two non-consecutive terms as mayor of Watertown, in 1862 and 1866. His association with bad railway bonds significantly damaged his reputation and he never held elected office again after his second mayoral term. After retiring from the bank, he made significant profitable investments in the region of Watertown, Dakota Territory, which he left to his sons.

He died at his home in Watertown, in September 1882. His death was sudden and occurred after a period of apparent good health.

== Personal life and family ==
William M. Dennis was married twice. He had at least one daughter with his first wife. After his first wife's death, he married Catherine Elizabeth Coughlin and had at least four more children. He was survived by his second wife and five children.

== Electoral history ==
=== Wisconsin Bank Comptroller (1853, 1855) ===
Wisconsin Bank Comptroller Election, 1853
Party	Candidate	Votes	%	±%
General Election, November 4, 1853
Democratic	William M. Dennis	30,750	55.58%	
Whig	Benjamin F. Pixley	24,363	44.04%	
Free Soil	E. A. Howland	211	0.38%	
Plurality		6,387	11.54%	
Total votes		55,324	100.0%	
Democratic hold				

Wisconsin Bank Comptroller Election, 1855
Party	Candidate	Votes	%	±%
General Election, November 6, 1855
Democratic	William M. Dennis (incumbent)	38,625	52.07%	−3.52%
Republican	Francis H. West	35,561	47.93%	
Plurality		3,064	4.13%	-7.41%
Total votes		74,186	100.0%	+34.09%
Democratic hold				

Party political offices
New elected office	Democratic nominee for Bank Comptroller of Wisconsin; 1853, 1855	Succeeded by Joel C. Squires
Wisconsin State Assembly
Preceded by Maximilian Averbeck	Member of the Wisconsin State Assembly from the Dodge 3rd district January 3, 1853 – January 2, 1854	Succeeded by Francis McCormick
Wisconsin Senate
New state government	Member of the Wisconsin Senate from the 10th district June 5, 1848 – January 7, 1850	Succeeded by James Giddings
Political offices
Preceded by Myron B. Williams	Mayor of Watertown, Wisconsin; April 1862 – April 1863	Succeeded by Joseph Lindon
Preceded by Robert Howell	Mayor of Watertown, Wisconsin; April 1866 – April 1867	Succeeded by Henry Mulberger
Preceded by James S. Baker	Bank Comptroller of Wisconsin; January 2, 1854 – January 4, 1858	Succeeded by Joel C. Squires
