= Frank H. Fowler =

20th century American politician

Member of the Wisconsin State Assembly from the La Crosse 1st district
- In office January 3, 1921 – January 1, 1923
- Preceded by: Carl Kurtenacker
- Succeeded by: Henry Nein

Personal details
- Born: April 15, 1861 Old Town, Maine, U.S.
- Died: May 4, 1944 (aged 83) Los Angeles, California, U.S.
- Resting place: Los Angeles Natl. Cemetery
- Party: Republican

Military service
- Allegiance: United States
- Branch/service: Wisconsin National Guard; United States Volunteers; United States Army
- Years of service: 1898–1899 (USV); 1917–1918 (USA)
- Rank: Lt. Colonel, USA
- Unit: 3rd Reg. Wis. Infantry; 32nd Div. U.S. Infantry
- Battles/wars: Spanish–American War; World War I

Frank H. Fowler (April 15, 1861 – May 4, 1944) was an American educator and Republican politician from La Crosse, Wisconsin. He was a member of the Wisconsin State Assembly, representing La Crosse during the 1921–1922 session.

== Biography ==
Frank H. Fowler was born April 15, 1861, at Old Town, Maine. He was raised and educated there, attending the Maine Wesleyan Seminary. He served 25 years as principal of schools in La Crosse, Wisconsin. He was an officer in the Wisconsin National Guard and served as a lieutenant in the 3rd Wisconsin Infantry Regiment during the Spanish–American War. He returned to service in World War I, with the rank of lieutenant colonel. He served on the staff of General William G. Haan in the 32nd U.S. Infantry Division (composed of Wisconsin and Michigan National Guard regiments).

He was elected to the Wisconsin State Assembly in 1920, running on the Republican Party ticket. He faced only a Prohibition candidate in opposition, and went on to serve in the 1921–1922 legislative term.

He did not run for re-election in 1922, and moved to Los Angeles, California, that year. He lived there for the rest of his life, dying on May 4, 1944.

== Electoral history ==
Wisconsin Assembly, La Crosse 1st District Election, 1920
| Party | Candidate | Votes | % | ±% |
|---|---|---|---|---|
General Election, November 2, 1920
| Republican | Frank H. Fowler | 6,065 | 94.54% | +11.49% |
| Prohibition | E. L. Townsend | 350 | 5.46% | |
| Plurality | | 5,715 | 89.09% | +22.98% |
| Total votes | | 6,415 | 100.00% | +167.74% |
| Republican hold | | | | |

Wisconsin State Assembly
| Preceded by Carl Kurtenecker | Member of the Wisconsin State Assembly from the La Crosse 1st district January 3, 1921 – January 1, 1923 | Succeeded by Henry Nein |
