= Dammon =

Dammon may refer to:

- Robert M. Dammon (born 1956), American professor and academic administrator
- Israel Dammon trial, American court case of 1845
- Dammon Round Barn, located southeast of Red Wing, Minnesota, United States

== See also ==
- Damon (disambiguation)
