= Joseph Bartholomew (general) =

American militia general (1766–1840)

Major General Joseph Bartholomew
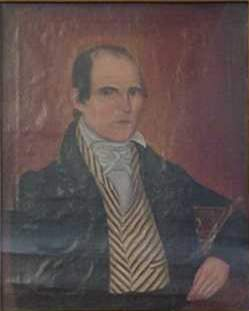
- Born: March 15, 1766; Province of New Jersey, British America
- Died: November 3, 1840 (aged 74); McLean County, Illinois, U.S.
- Burial place: Clarksville Cemetery
- Children: George M. Bartholomew
- Relatives: Joseph M. Bartholomew (grandson)
- Military career
- Allegiance: United States
- Branch: Indiana Militia
- Rank: Major general
- Conflicts: American Revolutionary War; Tecumseh's War; Battle of Tippecanoe; Black Hawk War

Joseph Bartholomew (March 15, 1766 – November 3, 1840) was a general in the Indiana Militia and served in numerous military conflicts. He also worked as a farmer, hunter, trapper, self-taught surveyor, and politician. Bartholomew County, Indiana and the Bartholomew Trail were named after him.

== Family life ==
Bartholomew was born in New Jersey. At the age of two, around the time of his father's death, his family moved to Laurel Hill, Pennsylvania. Bartholomew married Christiana Pickenpaugh in 1788 and they moved to Northern Kentucky, near present-day Louisville, with his mother.

In 1800, he moved his family into the newly created Indiana Territory in an area known as Clark's Grant near the town of Charlestown in Southern Indiana. In 1809, his wife died giving birth to their tenth child. In June 1811, Bartholomew married Elizabeth McNaught. She died in 1824 from injuries sustained after being thrown from a horse. Joseph never remarried.

His descendants are now living throughout the United States. His daughter Martha and several of his grandchildren were some of the earliest converts to Mormonism, and several were baptized into the Church of Jesus Christ of Latter Day Saints.

== American Revolution ==
Though he was only 10 years old at the outbreak of the American Revolutionary War, he joined the local militia and helped defend against Native American tribes who were raiding the western frontier.

== Northwest Indian War ==
After moving to Kentucky in 1788, Bartholomew remained active in the local militia, and engaged in numerous skirmishes with Native Americans. During the Northwest Indian War (Little Turtle's War), Bartholomew served as a scout for General "Mad" Anthony Wayne and was present at the signing of the Treaty of Greenville.

== Battle of Tippecanoe ==
After moving to Indiana, he received a commission as major in the Clark County militia on September 21, 1803. Three years later, he was promoted to lieutenant colonel. On November 7, 1811, he took part in the Battle of Tippecanoe. Recently promoted to colonel, he led 120 militia members under Governor William Henry Harrison. During the battle, Bartholomew was shot and seriously wounded in his right arm.

For his leadership during the Battle of Tippecanoe, Bartholomew was promoted to brigadier general. The Indiana territorial legislature passed a resolution on December 4, 1811, which read, "Resolved… that the thanks of this house be presented to Col. Luke Decker and Col. Joseph Bartholomew, the officers, non-commissioned officers and men composing the militia corps under their command…for the distinguished valor, heroism and bravery displayed by them in the brilliant battle fought with the Shawnee Prophet and his confederates on the morning of the 7th of Nov, 1811 by the Army under the command of His Excellency William Henry Harrison."

== War of 1812 ==
When Bartholomew's son fell ill, he volunteered to enlist as a private in his place under the command of Colonel Russell of the 7th Regiment to fight in the White River Campaign during the War of 1812. Bartholomew once conducted a raid against British-allied Delaware Native American towns. He set out with 137 mounted Indiana Rangers. Bartholomew and his rangers raided the Native American Delaware villages destroying 1000 bushels of corn, capturing 3 horses, surprising and killing one Native American warrior. However, a ranger was critically wounded by another Native American warrior who fired on the rangers from concealment and ran off. After Bartholomew and his rangers destroyed the food supplies. They withdrew back to Fort Vallonia. The wounded Indiana ranger who was also brought back to the fort later died from his wounds. After Colonel Russell praised Bartholomew, telling the Indiana territorial governor, "Col. Bartholomew acted as my aide-de-camp; the veteran has been so well tried in this kind of warfare, that any encomiums from me would be useless." In 1816, he was commissioned as major general, the highest rank at that time. He served as major general of the Indiana militia until 1822.

== Later life ==
After his wartime military service came to an end, Bartholomew became involved in politics. In 1818, he served on the Indiana General Assembly, and was elected to the Indiana Senate in 1820. He was selected to be a member of the commission that would choose the location of the capital of Indiana, and helped pick Indianapolis as the new site. He would often claim "to have dug the first dirt for the State capital." Though he moved home in 1822, he continued to serve the state on the board of commissioners for land deeds. He retired in 1825.

In 1831 Bartholomew was the bondsman for his neighbor Dr. Andrew P. Hay, who had embezzled government funds. As a result of the embezzlement, Bartholomew sold his farm and moved to McLean County, Illinois. He and his son planted a new town named Clarksville, north of present-day Bloomington, which was abandoned by the 1850s. He was an avid supporter in William Henry Harrison's presidential campaign in 1840. In the fall of that year, his health began declining. He died on November 3, 1840, and was buried in Clarksville cemetery in McLean County.

His grave marker was placed by the Grand Army of the Republic in 1894 with the inscription "To the memory of Maj. Genl. Joseph Bartholomew Hero of Tippecanoe. He also fought in the Revolutionary War, The War of 1812, & the Black Hawk War."

In 1973, a stone monument marking the approximate location of Gen. Bartholomew's Block House Fort (built during the Black Hawk War) was placed in the Dawson Cemetery in McLean County, IL.
