= William P. Dixon =

American lawyer and political strategist (1943–2025)

William Patrick Dixon (December 12, 1943 – January 8, 2025) was an American lawyer and political strategist.

A native of Buffalo, New York, born on December 12, 1943, Dixon graduated from St. Joseph's Collegiate Institute, and in 1970 from the University at Buffalo Law School. While he was in law school he worked as a garbageman, loan collector, and private investigator. He graduated the top in his class.

He became counsel to Wisconsin Governor Patrick Lucey, and after a year, he moved to Washington, D.C., to serve on the Democratic Party staff of the United States House Committee on the Judiciary during the impeachment of Richard Nixon. As the only House staffer allowed to listen to unedited versions of the Watergate tapes, Dixon prepared a series of memos that helped guide the committee's actions. He managed the Wisconsin presidential campaigns of George McGovern in 1972 and Jimmy Carter in 1976.

Carter appointed Dixon as the U.S. alternate director of the World Bank, and he served in that position from 1977 to 1979. He resigned from that post in order to serve as manager of the 1980 Democratic National Convention. In 1983, Wisconsin Governor Tony Earl appointed him as state banking commissioner, a position he held till he became an administrator for Colorado Senator Gary Hart in 1985. He later served as manager of Hart's 1988 presidential campaign. He then returned to Wisconsin, joining the small civil rights law firm where Barack Obama would served as an associate from 1993 to 1996 and of counsel from 1996 to 2004. Dixon died of prostate cancer on January 8, 2025, at the age of 81.
