= Joel C. Squires =

American politician (1819–1889)

3rd Bank Comptroller of Wisconsin
- In office January 4, 1858 – January 2, 1860
- Governor: Alexander Randall
- Preceded by: William M. Dennis
- Succeeded by: Gysbert Van Steenwyk Sr.

Member of the Wisconsin Senate
- In office January 3, 1853 – May 1, 1853
- Preceded by: John Sharpstein
- Succeeded by: James Wilson Seaton
- Constituency: 16th district
- In office January 5, 1852 – January 3, 1853
- Preceded by: John H. Rountree
- Succeeded by: Duncan Reed
- Constituency: 6th district

Member of the Wisconsin State Assembly from the Grant 1st district
- In office January 3, 1870 – January 2, 1871
- Preceded by: Joseph Harris
- Succeeded by: Joseph Harris

Personal details
- Born: December 11, 1819 Vienna Township, Ohio, U.S.
- Died: March 3, 1889 (aged 69) Platteville, Wisconsin, U.S.
- Resting place: Greenwood Cemetery, Platteville, Wisconsin
- Party: Democratic
- Spouse: Caroline M. Banfill (m. 1850–1918)
- Children: Laura E. (Hendershot)^{(b. 1850; died 1920)}; George Utley Squires^{(b. 1852; died 1855)}; Elizabeth E. (Washburn)^{(b. 1856; died 1939)}; Deforest Squires^{(b. 1859; died 1861)}; Emily Theresa Squires^{(b. 1869; died 1871)}

Joel Cook Squires (December 11, 1819 – March 3, 1889) was an American carpenter, miner, Wisconsin pioneer, and Democratic politician. He was elected as the 3rd Bank Comptroller of Wisconsin, and also served in the Wisconsin State Senate and Assembly, representing Grant County.

== Background ==
Squires was born in Vienna Township, Ohio, on December 11, 1819, and attended the public schools. He came to Wisconsin in 1838 and settled in the Platteville area in 1841. He died at his home in Platteville on March 3, 1889.

== Public service ==
Squires was Clerk of the Grant County Board of Supervisors for 1849, 1850 and 1851; he was Clerk of the Circuit Court in 1851 and 1852. At that time a resident of Lancaster, Squires was elected to the State Senate from the Sixth District for the 1852 session. Squires, a Democrat, succeeded Whig John H. Rountree. At the time of election, he was 31 years of age and had been in Wisconsin for twelve years; he listed his occupation as "carpenter".

After the Senate was re-apportioned and the Sixth District was shifted from the region around Platteville and the surrounding region to the Milwaukee area, Squires was succeeded by fellow Democrat Duncan Reed in the Sixth District, but was elected to the succeeding one-year term in the new Sixteenth District. On May 1, 1853, he resigned from the Senate; fellow Democrat James Wilson Seaton of Potosi was elected to fill his seat.

He served as Register of the United States Land Office at Mineral Point, from 1853 to 1857, until he was elected the State of Wisconsin's Bank Comptroller (at that time an elected position), serving through the end of 1859. He sought re-election in 1860, but was defeated by Republican Gysbert Van Steenwyk Sr.

== In the Assembly ==
In 1870, now living in Platteville and working as a miner, he was elected for a single year term from the first Grant County Assembly district (the Towns of Hazel Green, Smeltzer and Platteville), succeeding Republican Joseph Harris. He received 465 votes to 437 for Republican William E. Carter (Harris was not a candidate). He ran for re-election in 1871, but lost to Harris by 295 votes to 567 for Harris.

== Electoral history ==
=== Wisconsin Bank Comptroller (1857, 1859) ===
Wisconsin Bank Comptroller Election, 1857
Party	Candidate	Votes	%	±%
General Election, November 3, 1857
Democratic	Joel C. Squires	44,859	50.47%	
Republican	J. P. McGregor	44,024	49.53%	
Plurality		835	0.94%	
Total votes		88,883	100.0%	
Democratic hold				

Wisconsin Bank Comptroller Election, 1859
Party	Candidate	Votes	%	±%
General Election, November 8, 1859
Republican	Gysbert Van Steenwyk Sr.	59,697	53.03%	+3.50%
Democratic	Joel C. Squires (incumbent)	52,880	46.97%	−3.50%
Plurality		6,817	6.06%	+5.12%
Total votes		112,577	100.0%	+26.66%
Republican gain from Democratic				

=== Wisconsin Assembly (1869, 1870) ===
Wisconsin Assembly, Grant 1st District Election, 1869
Party	Candidate	Votes	%	±%
General Election, November 2, 1869
Democratic	Joel C. Squires	465	51.55%	
Republican	William E. Carter	437	48.45%	
Plurality		28	3.10%	
Total votes		902	100.0%	
Democratic gain from Republican				

Wisconsin Assembly, Grant 1st District Election, 1870
Party	Candidate	Votes	%	±%
General Election, November 8, 1870
Republican	Joseph Harris	567	65.78%	+17.33%
Democratic	Joel C. Squires (incumbent)	295	34.22%	−17.33%
Plurality		272	31.55%	+28.45%
Total votes		862	100.0%	-4.43%
Republican gain from Democratic				

Wisconsin State Assembly
Preceded by Joseph Harris	Member of the Wisconsin State Assembly from the Grant 1st district January 3, 1870 – January 2, 1871	Succeeded by Joseph Harris
Wisconsin Senate
Preceded by John H. Rountree	Member of the Wisconsin Senate from the 6th district January 5, 1852 – January 3, 1853	Succeeded by Duncan Reed
Preceded by John Sharpstein	Member of the Wisconsin Senate from the 16th district January 3, 1853 – May 1, 1853	Succeeded by James Wilson Seaton
Political offices
Preceded by William M. Dennis	Bank Comptroller of Wisconsin; January 4, 1858 – January 2, 1860	Succeeded by Gysbert Van Steenwyk Sr.
