= Francis Fowler =

Francis Fowler may refer to:

- Francis George Fowler (1871–1918), English writer
- Francis John Fowler (1864–1939), British officer in the Indian Army
- Francis Fowler (architect) (1819–1893), English architect

== See also ==
- Frances Fowler (1864–1943), American painter
- Frank Fowler (disambiguation)
