= George M. Bartholomew =

19th century American politician

G. M. Bartholomew

Member of the Wisconsin State Assembly from the Columbia 1st district
- In office January 5, 1857 – January 4, 1858
- Preceded by: Moses M. Davis
- Succeeded by: Alvin B. Alden

Personal details
- Born: March 12, 1812 Clark County, Indiana, U.S.
- Died: April 11, 1885 (aged 73) Lodi, Wisconsin, U.S.
- Resting place: Mount Pleasant Cemetery, Lodi, Wisconsin
- Party: Republican
- Spouse: Susan C. Hefner (m. 1833–1885)
- Children: Alonzo Bartholomew^{(unknown death date)}; George A. Bartholomew^{(died 1902)}; Catherine Elizabeth (McCloud)^{(b. 1834; died 1910)}; Joseph M. Bartholomew^{(b. 1843; died 1901)}; Josephine B. (Chapin)^{(b. 1846; died 1920)}; Minerva Bartholomew^{(b. 1849; died 1852)}; Ella B. (Luse)^{(b. 1854; died 1900)}; James I. Bartholomew^{(b. 1857; died 1953)}
- Parent: Joseph Bartholomew (father)

George McNaught Bartholomew (March 12, 1812 – April 11, 1885) was an American farmer, surveyor, and Wisconsin pioneer. He was one of the founders of Lodi, Wisconsin, and served one term in the Wisconsin State Assembly, representing western Columbia County.

He was the son of American major general Joseph Bartholomew. His son, also named Joseph Bartholomew, was the 2nd chief justice of the North Dakota Supreme Court.

== Biography ==
George Bartholomew was the son of American major general Joseph Bartholomew, a pioneer settler of Indiana. George Bartholomew was born in Clark County, Indiana, in March 1812. At age 21, he went west to McLean County, Illinois, where he was married.

In the spring of 1844, he visited the Wisconsin Territory and reviewed lands in the Lodi and Portage region of Columbia County. The following spring, he and his elder half-brother, Marston Clarke Bartholomew, set out to establish a settlement at Lodi. At the time of their settlement, the nearest post office was twenty miles south, in Madison. Their families followed in the Fall, along with their younger brother William Milton Bartholomew. George Bartholomew's daughter, Josephine, was said to be the first white child born at Lodi.

The Bartholomews participated in the organizing of the town government in 1846. In 1847, he was elected to the three-member county board of commissioners—the board of commissioners was the government for Columbia County prior to Wisconsin's statehood. After Wisconsin became a state, he was elected county surveyor in 1854, 1872, and 1876. He also served as chairman of the county board of supervisors in 1865, 1869, and 1870.

In 1856, Bartholomew was elected to the Wisconsin State Assembly on the Republican ticket. He represented Columbia County's 1st Assembly district—the western parts of the county.

== Personal life and family ==
Bartholomew's father Joseph Bartholomew, volunteered for service in the American Revolutionary War at only ten years old and rose to the rank of major general after distinguishing himself in the War of 1812.

George Bartholomew married Susan C. Hefner in 1833 at McLean County, Illinois. They had at least eight children. Their son Joseph Milton Bartholomew became one of the first justices of the North Dakota Supreme Court, and was the 2nd chief justice.

The Bartholomews were active with the Methodist church and led the effort to establish the church in Lodi.

Wisconsin State Assembly
Preceded by Moses M. Davis	Member of the Wisconsin State Assembly from the Columbia 1st district January 5, 1857 – January 4, 1858	Succeeded by Alvin B. Alden
