= Alvin Alden =

19th century American businessman and politician

Member of the Wisconsin State Assembly from the Columbia 1st district
- In office January 4, 1858 – January 3, 1859
- Preceded by: George M. Bartholomew
- Succeeded by: Gysbert Van Steenwyk Sr.

Personal details
- Born: March 1, 1818 Stafford, Connecticut or Stamford, Connecticut
- Died: August 18, 1882 (aged 64) Eau Claire, Wisconsin, U.S.
- Resting place: Silver Lake Cemetery, Portage, Wisconsin
- Party: Democratic

Alvin Blodgett Alden (March 1, 1818 – August 18, 1882) was an American businessman, Democratic politician, and Wisconsin pioneer. He was mayor of Portage, Wisconsin, in 1861 and represented western Columbia County in the Wisconsin State Assembly during the 1858 legislative term.

Born in Stafford, Connecticut or Stamford, Connecticut, Alden moved to Randolph, Wisconsin Territory in 1844 and then moved to Portage, Wisconsin in 1851. He worked for the Wisconsin Secretary of State as an insurance clerk and a loan agent for the North Western Life Insurance Company. He served as mayor of Portage, Wisconsin. In 1858, Alden served in the Wisconsin State Assembly and was a Democrat. Alden died in Eau Claire, Wisconsin.

Wisconsin State Assembly
Preceded by George M. Bartholomew	Member of the Wisconsin State Assembly from the Columbia 1st district January 4, 1858 – January 3, 1859	Succeeded by Gysbert Van Steenwyk Sr.
