= Donald A. McDonald =

American politician (1833–1906)

Donald Alexander McDonald (January 1, 1833 - February 11, 1906) was a steamboat owner and lumberman from La Crosse, Wisconsin, who served in both houses of the state legislature as well as being a candidate for mayor of that city.

== Background ==
McDonald was born in Gairloch in Pictou County, Nova Scotia, on January 1, 1833. In June 1844 he moved with his family to Dundas, Canada West. There he received an academic education in the common schools until 1853, when he moved to nearby Hamilton.

== In Wisconsin ==
In 1855 he moved to Wisconsin and settled in Trempealeau where he went into the lumbering business, and remained for some time. He moved to La Crosse in 1869 where he engaged in lumbering and the operating of steamboats.

In 1873 McDonald, who had held various education-related local offices, was elected to the Wisconsin State Assembly from La Crosse County as a member of the Liberal Reform Party (a recently formed coalition of Democrats, reform and Liberal Republicans, and Grangers which secured the election of one Governor of Wisconsin and a number of state legislators) for a one-year term, with 1866 votes to 1740 for Republican R. M. Mooer. He was assigned to the standing committees on railroads and on enrolled bills. In 1874, he was defeated as the Liberal Reform candidate for the Senate's 31st District by Republican Sylvester Nevins, who won by 74 votes (1926 to 1852).

He remained in the lumber and steamboat businesses, and also traded in groceries, in large part to supply his own boats, shanties and so forth. In March 1882, he was granted a patent for an improved method of connected boats towing other watercraft, to improve steering and facilitate sharp turns.

In 1882, he was elected as a Democrat (the Reform Party having collapsed in the late 1870s) to the Senate seat he'd sought earlier, with 2853 votes to 1618 for former Republican Assemblyman John Brindley and 231 for Prohibitionist John James (Republican incumbent Merrick Wing was not a candidate). He would serve on the standing committee on privileges and elections.

In 1885, when eccentric local physician David Franklin Powell ran for mayor of La Crosse, McDonald (who had long been influential in La Crosse business circles) was tapped as the Democratic nominee for mayor. Powell outpolled McDonald by over 250 votes, although McDonald did better than the Republican candidate.

He was not a candidate for re-election in 1886, and was succeeded by Republican Thomas Dyson.

== Personal life ==
He married Anna Black Beers, with whom he would have four children. He died on February 11, 1906, in La Crosse.
