= Minnesota State Academy for the Deaf =

Location
- 615 Olof Hanson Drive; Faribault, Rice, Minnesota 55021; United States

Information
- Former name: Minnesota School for the Deaf
- Type: Public
- Established: 1858
- School district: 160
- Superintendent: Terry Wilding
- Director: Jason Cox
- Faculty: 18
- Grades: Pre-K to 12+
- Age range: 12 months to 22
- Enrollment: 82
- Language: American Sign Language and English
- Colors: Maroon and gold
- Athletics: Volleyball, Football, Cheerleading, Basketball, Track and Field.
- Athletics conference: Great Plains Schools for the Deaf
- Mascot: Trojans
- Newspaper: Companion
- Website: msad.msa.state.mn.us

- Administration Building--Girls' Dormitory, Minnesota School for the Deaf
- U.S. National Register of Historic Places
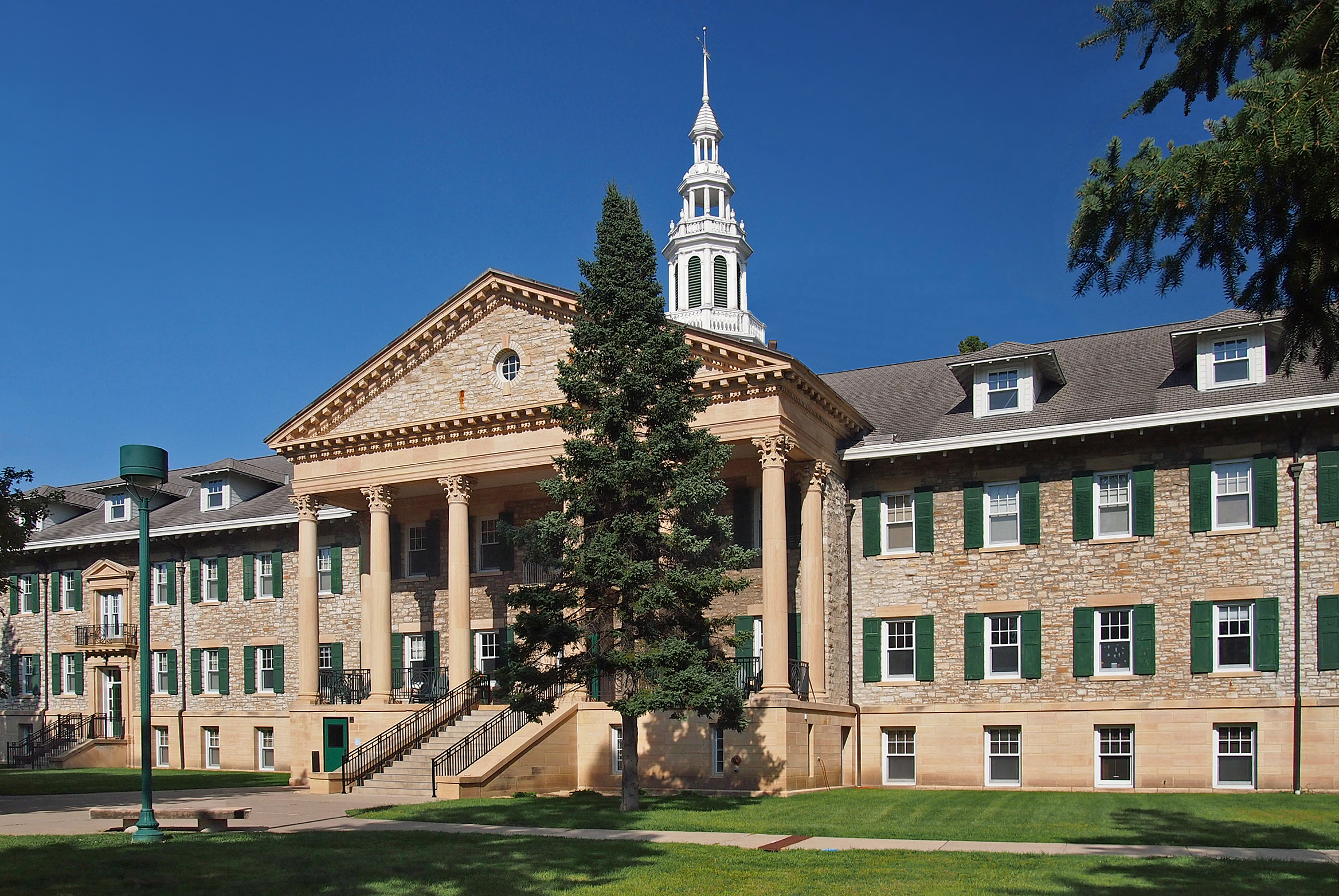
- Location: 615 Olof Hanson Drive
- Nearest city: Faribault, Minnesota
- Coordinates: 44°17′51″N 93°15′35″W
- Built: 1912
- Architect: Clarence H. Johnston, Sr.
- Architectural style: Georgian Revival
- NRHP reference No.: 86003095
- Added to NRHP: November 6, 1986

- Noyes Hall, State School for the Deaf
- U.S. National Register of Historic Places
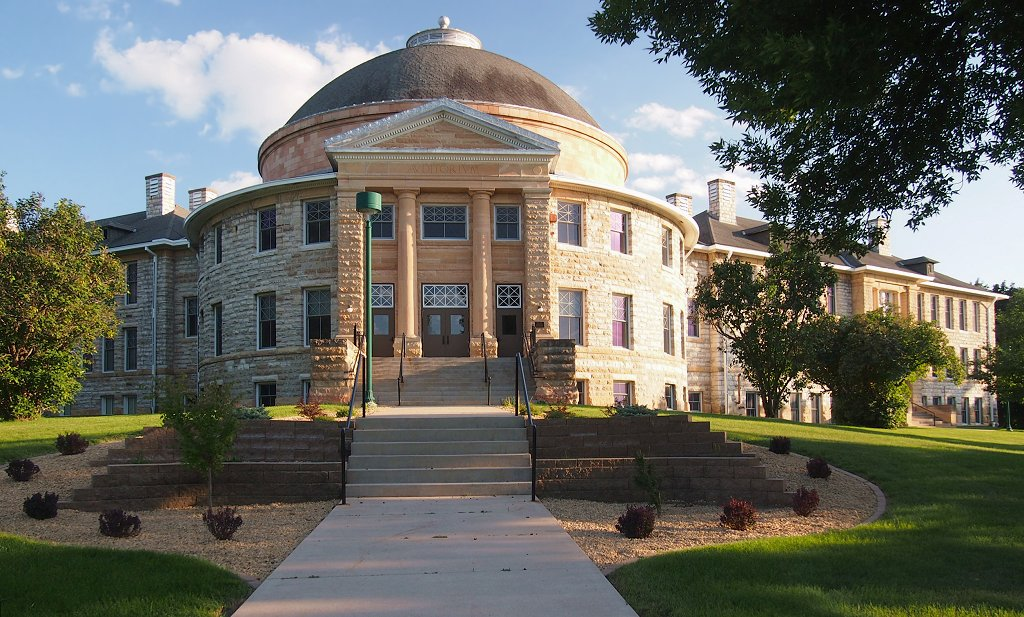
- Noyes Hall from the north
- Location: 615 Olof Hanson Drive
- Nearest city: Faribault, Minnesota
- Coordinates: 44°17′49″N 93°15′42″W
- Built: 1902–1910
- Architect: Clarence H. Johnston, Sr.
- Architectural style: Neoclassical
- NRHP reference No.: 75001020
- Added to NRHP: May 12, 1975

The Minnesota State Academy for the Deaf (MSAD) is a public residential school serving deaf children in Minnesota, United States. It is one of two Minnesota State Academies in Faribault and operated by the state for particular student populations.

== History ==
Minnesota became a state on May 11, 1858. In that year, during the session of the first state legislature, definite action was taken looking forward the establishment of a school for the deaf children of Minnesota.

The Honorable George E. Skinner, one of Faribault's representatives in the state legislature, asked that a "deaf and dumb asylum" be located in Faribault. The legislature decided that this institution should be located in Faribault if the citizens of the town would provide 40 acres of land within two miles of town for a site.

Citizens promptly donated 40 acres a mile or so west of town for the institution. Here the matter rested for five years. No action was taken during these five years is not surprising when we recall that this was the time of the Civil War and local rebellion.

When the legislature met in January 1863, Senator Berry of Faribault introduced a bill providing for the inauguration of the proposed school for deaf and blind children.

One of the first steps was to appoint a superintendent for the school. A number of applications were received and one of the commissioners, Mr. Rodney A. Mott, went to Ohio to meet Roswell H. Kinney, one of the teachers at the Ohio School for the Deaf. Mr. Kinney was highly recommended and was named the first superintendent.

On returning to Faribault, Mott began looking for a place in which to open the school. There was no money available to put up a building on the 40 acre site. Mott did the only thing he could. He rented a building in town. The rental was $150 a year. The building was located on Front and Main and had been a store and home. This is now the corner of Central Ave and Division St.. The building was furnished and made ready for the opening of school on the second Wednesday of September, 1863.

The Minnesota School for the Deaf and Dumb was established in 1863 with eight students enrolled. A department for the education of the blind was added in 1866.

In 1893, Blanche Wilkins Williams was the first deaf African-American woman to graduate, and she was a top student in her class.

The name was changed to the Minnesota School for the Deaf in 1902.

In 1986, the institution's name became the Minnesota State Academy for the Deaf (MSAD).

Two buildings are listed on the National Register of Historic Places, both designed by state architect Clarence H. Johnston, Sr.: the Administration Building/Girls' Dormitory, in a Georgian Revival style, and Noyes Hall, in a Classical Revival style. Frechette Hall, the boys dormitory built in 1957, was demolished in 2015 and replaced in 2018 with Wilkins Hall, named after the first African American to graduate from the school, Blanche Wilkins Williams.

== Student body ==
Minnesota State Academy for the Deaf serves students with varying degrees of hearing loss from all regions of the state from birth to 22 years of age. Teachers are licensed in Deaf and Hard of Hearing education. Families have a choice whether to have their child enrolled as a day-student and commute home daily or as a residential student and stay in one of dormitories and commute home weekly or a mix of both.

== Programs ==
Minnesota State Academy for the Deaf offers a variety of programs and services for deaf, deafblind, and hard of hearing services. These programs include:

- Academic programs from preschool through high school
- Residential housing
- Transportation
- Speech-language therapy
- Occupational therapy
- Physical therapy
- Counseling
- Recreation
- Athletics

Academic programs are designed to meet the needs of deaf, deafblind, and hard of hearing students. The school uses a variety of teaching methods including American Sign Language (ASL), English, and Protactile. MSAD also offers a variety of extracurricular activities, such as sports, clubs, and student government.

== Campus ==
The Minnesota State Academy for the Deaf is situated in Faribault, Minnesota, approximately 40 miles south of Minneapolis along Interstate Highway 35. Spanning 47.5 acres, the academy's campus offers facilities to support its educational and residential programs.

The campus features multiple academic buildings, providing dedicated spaces for classrooms, laboratories, and other learning environments.

In addition to academic buildings, the campus includes dormitories.

== Residency ==
MSAD is a residential school. It has two dormitories where students reside throughout the week. Students typically arrive on Sunday evenings and depart on Friday afternoons. Transportation is provided by the students' respective school districts. Parents can choose to pick up and drop off their child(ren) at the campus. Dormitories are for students who live more than 20 miles from the campus. Students who live within 20 miles of the campus are called "day students."

== Athletics ==
The Minnesota State Academy for the Deaf offers a range of athletic opportunities for its students. The school's athletic program includes popular team sports such as football, volleyball, basketball, and track and field. These sports provide students with opportunities for physical activity, skill development, and teamwork.

In addition to these core sports, the academy also provides options for students to participate in other sports through cooperative arrangements with local schools. For instance, students who are interested in playing hockey can join cooperative teams with other schools in the area. This cooperative approach allows students to engage in a wider variety of sports and benefit from the camaraderie and competitive spirit that organized athletics offer.

By offering a diverse selection of athletic activities, the Minnesota State Academy for the Deaf encourages students to lead active and healthy lifestyles while promoting teamwork and sportsmanship. Through their participation in sports, students have the chance to develop their athletic abilities, build friendships, and learn valuable life skills that extend beyond the playing field.

=== Facilities ===
The Minnesota State Academy for the Deaf provides its athletic teams with various facilities to support their training and competitions. Here are the key facilities utilized by different sports teams:

- Maurice Potter Field: The football team of the academy plays their home games on Maurice Potter Field, located on the campus itself. This dedicated field provides a suitable venue for football practices and home games, offering the necessary infrastructure and amenities.
- Lauritsen Gymnasium: The volleyball and basketball teams of the academy utilize the Lauritsen Gymnasium for their practices and home games. This indoor facility provides a controlled environment for training and hosting matches, equipped with appropriate courts, seating, and other necessary features.
- Bruce Smith Field and Ted Nelson Track: The track and field team at the academy conducts their practices on campus, taking advantage of the available training facilities. However, when it comes to competitions, the team competes at the Bruce Smith Field and Ted Nelson Track, situated in the town. These off-campus venues provide the appropriate tracks, fields, and equipment required for hosting track and field events.

=== Noted athletes ===
Notable athletes that have attended Minnesota State Academy for the Deaf include:

- Ronda Jo Miller
- Maurice Potter
- Tasha Lemke
- John Dolezal
- Calvin Rausch, Ryan Johnson, and Steven Hubmer
