= Gysbert Van Steenwyk Sr. =

19th century American banker and politician

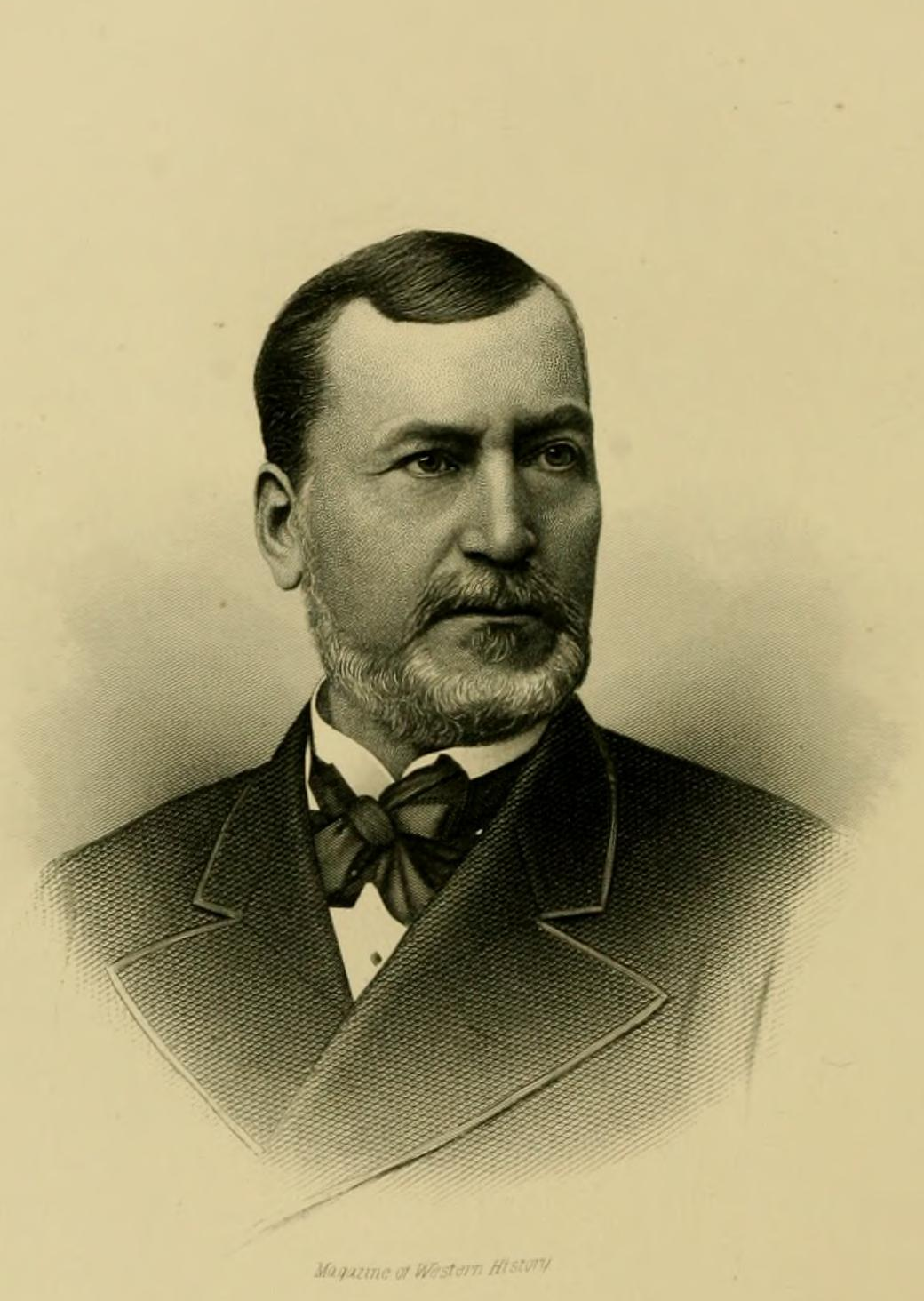
- Portrait from Biographical History of La Crosse, Trempealeau and Buffalo Counties, Wisconsin (1894)

4th Bank Comptroller of Wisconsin
- In office January 2, 1860 – January 6, 1862
- Governor: Alexander Randall
- Preceded by: Joel C. Squires
- Succeeded by: William H. Ramsey

Member of the Wisconsin Senate from the 31st district
- In office January 6, 1879 – January 3, 1881
- Preceded by: Merrick Wing
- Succeeded by: Merrick Wing

15th Mayor of La Crosse, Wisconsin
- In office April 1873 – April 1874
- Preceded by: James I. Lyndes
- Succeeded by: Gilbert M. Woodward

Member of the Wisconsin State Assembly from the Columbia 1st district
- In office January 3, 1859 – January 2, 1860
- Preceded by: Alvin Alden
- Succeeded by: Henry B. Munn

Personal details
- Born: January 30, 1814 Utrecht, Netherlands
- Died: April 13, 1902 (aged 88)
- Resting place: Oak Grove Cemetery, La Crosse, Wisconsin
- Party: Republican
- Spouse: Mariette Nichols 1847-1930

Military service
- Allegiance: Netherlands; United States
- Branch/service: Royal Netherlands Army (1830–1831); National Reserve Corps (1833–1849); Wisconsin Militia (1857–1859)
- Rank: Brig. General, Wis.

Gysbert Van Steenwyk Sr. (birth name: Gijsbert; January 30, 1814 – April 13, 1902) was a Dutch American immigrant, banker, and Republican politician from La Crosse, Wisconsin. He was the 4th Bank Comptroller of Wisconsin and served in the Wisconsin State Senate and State Assembly.

== Background ==
Van Steenwyk was the son of Arnoud van Steenwijk and Neeltje van Vliet and was born in Utrecht, the Netherlands. He served as a volunteer in the Royal Netherlands Army in 1830 and 1831, and as a commissioned officer of the National Guards from 1833 to 1849. Van Steenwyk graduated from the University of Utrecht in 1836, where he studied philosophy and classical literature.

== In the United States ==
He came to the United States in May 1849, and settled in Milwaukee until 1851, when he moved to Newport, Sauk County, where he resided until 1858; then removed to Kilbourn City in Columbia County.

== Public office ==
Van Steenwyk was appointed consul of the Netherlands for Wisconsin in 1849, and additionally for Michigan and Minnesota in 1850 (he resigned as consul in 1859). He was appointed commissioner of immigration for Wisconsin in New York City by Governor of Wisconsin Leonard J. Farwell from 1852 to 1853. He was appointed as a brigadier general of the Wisconsin State Militia in 1857.

Van Steenwyk, at that time was working as a land and insurance agent and living in Kilbourn City (now called Wisconsin Dells), was elected as a Republican member of the Wisconsin State Assembly in 1858 for the 1st Columbia County Assembly district (the Towns of Dekorah, West Point, Newport, Lewiston, Portage, Caledonia, Lodi and Pacific) succeeding Democrat Alvin Alden. He was appointed to the standing committees on education and school and university lands; and on railroads., then was elected state Bank Comptroller for 1860–61, unseating incumbent Democrat Joel Squires. He was succeeded in the Assembly by Democrat Henry B. Munn. He was succeeded as Comptroller by Democrat William H. Ramsey.

== After serving as comptroller ==
In January 1862, he moved to La Crosse, where he worked as a banker. From 1873 to 1874, Van Steenwyk served as mayor of La Crosse. He was elected senator from the Wisconsin Senate, District 31 (La Crosse County) for 1879–80, receiving 1,849 votes to 747 for Greenback Edward Cronan and 729 for Democrat W. A. Anderson (Republican incumbent Merrick Wing was not a candidate for re-election). He was assigned to the committees on insurance, banks and banking; and on enrolled bills, chairing the latter. He was not a candidate for re-election and was succeeded by Merrick Wing.

Wisconsin State Assembly
Preceded by Alvin Alden	Member of the Wisconsin State Assembly from the Columbia 1st district January 3, 1859 – January 2, 1860	Succeeded by Henry B. Munn
Wisconsin Senate
Preceded by Merrick Wing	Member of the Wisconsin Senate from the 31st district January 6, 1879 – January 3, 1881	Succeeded by Merrick Wing
Political offices
Preceded by James I. Lyndes	Mayor of La Crosse, Wisconsin; April 1873 – April 1874	Succeeded by Gilbert M. Woodward
Preceded by Joel C. Squires	Bank Comptroller of Wisconsin; January 2, 1860 – January 6, 1862	Succeeded by William H. Ramsey
