= Wisconsin Department of Financial Institutions =

Wisconsin State Agency charged with regulating financial institutions in the state

Agency overview
- Formed: July 1, 1996; 30 years ago
- Preceding agencies: Wisconsin Bank Comptroller (1853–1868); Wisconsin Department of Banking (1903–1967); Wisconsin Department of Securities (1939–1967); Wisconsin Commissioner of Banking (1967–1996); Wisconsin Commissioner of Securities (1967–1996); Wisconsin Commissioner of Credit Unions (1971–1996)
- Headquarters: Hill Farms State Office Building 4822 Madison Yards Way Madison, Wisconsin, U.S.; 43°4′27.66″N 89°27′38.16″W
- Employees: 141.54 (2021)
- Annual budget: $39,712,500 (2021)
- Agency executives: Wendy K. Baumann, Secretary-designee; Craig Heilman, Deputy Secretary; Catherine Haberland, Assistant Deputy Secretary
- Website: www.dfi.wi.gov

The Wisconsin Department of Financial Institutions (DFI) is an agency of the Wisconsin state government responsible for state regulation of financial institutions and educating the public about financial issues.

The department headquarters are located at the Hill Farms State Office Building on the west side of Madison, Wisconsin. The current secretary-designee of the Wisconsin Department of Financial Institutions is Wendy K. Baumann. She was appointed by Governor Tony Evers in January 2025.

== History ==
The Constitution of Wisconsin, approved in 1848, specified in Article XI, Sections 4 and 5, that no banking law could be enacted in the state without a statewide amendment ratifying the change. Under this procedure, in 1852, the Wisconsin Legislature passed 1852 Wisc. Act 479 which first authorized the establishment of banks in the state and created the Office of Bank Comptroller—a statewide elected official empowered to oversee and regulate the issuance of bank notes. The act was ratified by referendum in the Spring of 1853, and the first State Bank Comptroller, James S. Baker, was appointed by Governor Leonard J. Farwell.

The Bank Comptroller was abolished in 1868 and its responsibilities transferred to a bank examiner in the Office of the State Treasurer of Wisconsin, where those duties remained until 1903. In 1902, Wisconsin voters approved an amendment to the State Constitution significantly altering Article XI, Section 4, to allow more flexibility for the Legislature in regulating banks. The 1903 Legislature then passed 1903 Wisc. Act 234, which established a State Banking Department. Regulation of securities and credit unions were introduced in 1913 with 1913 Wisc. Act 733 and 1913 Wisc. Act 756. Credit union regulation was assigned to the State Banking Department; regulation of securities, however, was assigned to the State Railroad Commission until 1939, when a State Department of Securities was established (1939 Wisc. Act 68).

The next major evolution occurred in the 1967 executive branch reorganization, which abolished the State Banking Department and the Department of Securities, creating a Commissioner for Banking and Commissioner for Securities. A separate Commissioner of Credit Unions was created in 1971.

The current Department of Financial Institutions was created by 1995 Wisc. Act 27. The commissioners for banking, securities, and credit unions were absorbed as separate divisions within the new state agency.

== Organization ==
=== Leadership ===
The senior leadership of the Department consists of the Secretary, Deputy Secretary, and Assistant Deputy Secretary, along with the administrators heading up the divisions of the Department.

- Secretary-designee: Wendy K. Baumann
- Deputy Secretary: Craig Heilman
- Assistant Deputy Secretary: Catherine Haberland
- Administrative Services and Technology: Michael Trepanier
- Banking: Kim Swissdorf
- Corporate and Consumer Services: Kristie Pulvermacher
- Securities: Leslie Van Buskirk
- Credit Unions: Thomas Theune

=== Divisions ===
==== Office of the Secretary ====
Subdivisions include:

- Communications Director
- Office of Legal Counsel
- Office of Financial Literacy

==== Division of Administrative Services and Technology ====
The Division of Administrative Services and Technology manages the department's budget, personnel, procurement, and technology services.

==== Division of Banking ====
The Division of Banking charters, examines, and regulates state-chartered banks savings institutions and consumer financial services industries. They also provide the licensing service for all entities involved in loan origination activities, collections agencies, payday lenders, and other such businesses. They also investigate applications for expanded bank powers, new financial products, and interstate bank acquisitions and mergers.

The Division also administers the Wisconsin Consumer Act, which handles consumer complaints and advises consumers and lenders on their rights and responsibilities under the law.

==== Division of Corporate and Consumer Services ====
The Division of Corporate and Consumer Services is responsible for examining and filing documents and business records for corporations and other such entities operating in Wisconsin. They examine business charters, documentation for mergers, consolidations, and dissolutions, and annual reports. They also review documents filed under the Uniform Commercial Code and maintain the state's Uniform Commercial Code lien system.

In addition, they evaluate the notary public applications and renewals, trademark registrations, and cable or video service franchise registrations, as well as professional employer organizations, charitable organizations, and professional fund-raisers.

==== Division of Securities ====
The Division of Securities regulates the sale of investment securities and franchises, and handles registrations and required notice filings for offerings. In addition, they register and perform regular examination of agents involved in securities trading, including broker-dealers and investment advisors. They also investigate any complaints or violations and initiates appropriate response actions.

=== Subordinate boards ===
Separate from the ordinary organizational structure of the Department, there are a number of specific commissions created by acts of the Wisconsin Legislature to oversee, advise, or administer certain functions.

- Banking Review Board
- Savings Institutions Review Board

=== Attached independent entities ===
==== Office of Credit Unions ====
The Office of Credit Unions regulates state-chartered credit unions. It charters new credit unions, examines their records and assets, and handles certain credit union requests and approvals. If a credit union falls out of compliance with state law, the office may remove its officers, suspend its operations, or take possession of the business.

==== College Savings Program Board ====
The College Savings Program Board administers the state's Edvest and Tomorrow's Scholar tax-advantaged investment accounts used to save for college expenses.

== Secretaries and Commissioners ==
=== Bank Comptrollers (1853–1868) ===
Comptroller	Took office	Left office	Notes
James S. Baker	November 20, 1852	January 2, 1854	Appointed by Leonard J. Farwell
William M. Dennis	January 2, 1854	January 4, 1858	Elected 1853, re-elected 1855
Joel C. Squires	January 4, 1858	January 2, 1860	Elected 1857
Gysbert Van Steenwyk Sr.	January 2, 1860	January 6, 1862	Elected 1859
William Ramsey	January 6, 1862	January 1, 1866	Elected 1861, re-elected 1863
Jeremiah McLain Rusk	January 1, 1866	January 3, 1870	Elected 1865, re-elected 1867

=== Bank Examiners under the State Treasurer (1895–1903) ===
Examiner	Took office	Left office	Notes
Edward I. Kidd	April 24, 1895	April 1, 1902	
Marcus C. Bergh	April 1, 1902	May 18, 1903	

=== Commissioners of the State Banking Department (1903–1933) ===
Commissioner	Took office	Left office	Notes
Marcus C. Bergh	May 18, 1903	January 17, 1911	Appointed by Robert M. La Follette.
Albert E. Kuolt	January 17, 1911	December 16, 1918	Appointed by Francis E. McGovern.
Marshall Cousins	December 16, 1918	May 7, 1923	Appointed by Emanuel L. Philipp.
Dwight T. Parker	May 7, 1923	December 28, 1926	Appointed by John J. Blaine.
Thomas Herreid	December 28, 1926	January 3, 1927	Appointed by John J. Blaine.
Calvin F. Schwenker	January 3, 1927	August 12, 1931	Appointed by Fred R. Zimmerman.
Thomas Herreid	August 12, 1931	January 20, 1933	Acting
Arthur C. Kingston	January 20, 1933	July 1, 1933	Appointed by Albert G. Schmedeman.

=== Members of the three-man Banking Commission (1933–1947) ===
Commissioner	Took office	Left office	Notes
Arthur C. Kingston	July 1, 1933	August 23, 1933	Resigned.
Stanley N. Schafer	July 14, 1933	January 1, 1937	Appointed by Albert G. Schmedeman.
Peter A. Cleary	July 14, 1933	April 1, 1939	Appointed by Albert G. Schmedeman.
Milo C. Hagen	August 23, 1933	December 24, 1933	Appointed by Albert G. Schmedeman. Died in office.
Herbert F. Ibach	January 6, 1934	October 10, 1940	Appointed by Albert G. Schmedeman.
Frank Bixby	October 17, 1937	April 1, 1943	Appointed by Philip La Follette.
Allen G. Pflugradt	April 19, 1939	May 13, 1943	Appointed by Julius P. Heil.
Robert Kirkland Henry	October 10, 1940	July 1, 1944	Appointed by Julius P. Heil.
James B. Mulva	April 1, 1943	June 30, 1947	Appointed by Walter Samuel Goodland.
Edward W. Tamm	May 14, 1943	June 30, 1947	Appointed by Walter Samuel Goodland.
Arthur J. Quinn	January 30, 1945	June 30, 1947	Appointed by Walter Samuel Goodland.

=== Commissioners of Banking (1947–1996) ===
Commissioner	Took office	Left office	Notes
Guerdon M. Matthews	July 18, 1947	December 1, 1959	Appointed by Oscar Rennebohm.
William E. Nuesse	December 1, 1959	June 30, 1968	Acting commissioner until August 1960. Paul McGettigan was nominated by Gaylord Nelson and confirmed in January 1960, but never took office.
Roger L. Heironimus	July 1, 1968	June 30, 1971	Appointed by Warren P. Knowles.
Erich Mildenberg	November 1, 1971	April 30, 1980	Appointed by Patrick J. Lucey.
Thomas E. Pederson	April 30, 1980	January 9, 1983	Acting commissioner until November 1980. Appointed by Lee S. Dreyfus. Died in office.
William P. Dixon	January 20, 1983	December 31, 1984	Appointed by Tony Earl.
Richard E. Galecki	March 9, 1985	March 1, 1989	Appointed by Tony Earl.
Toby E. Sherry	March 1, 1989	January 8, 1993	Appointed by Tommy Thompson.
Richard Dean	January 8, 1993	July 1, 1996	Acting commissioner until February 1993. Appointed by Tommy Thompson.

=== Secretaries (1996–present) ===
Secretary	Took office	Left office	Notes
Richard Dean	July 1, 1996	February 1, 2000	Appointed by Tommy Thompson.
John F. Kundert	February 2, 2000	January 6, 2003	Appointed by Tommy Thompson.
Patricia D. Struck	January 6, 2003	August 4, 2003	Acting secretary.
Lorrie Keating Heinemann	August 4, 2003	January 3, 2011	Appointed by Jim Doyle.
Peter Bildsten	January 3, 2011	March 6, 2015	Appointed by Scott Walker.
Ray Allen	March 6, 2015	January 22, 2016	Appointed by Scott Walker.
Lon Roberts	January 22, 2016	March 6, 2017	Appointed by Scott Walker.
Jay Risch	March 6, 2017	January 7, 2019	Appointed by Scott Walker.
Kathy K. Blumenfeld	January 7, 2019		Appointed by Tony Evers.
