= James Wilson Seaton =

19th century American politician

James W. Seaton
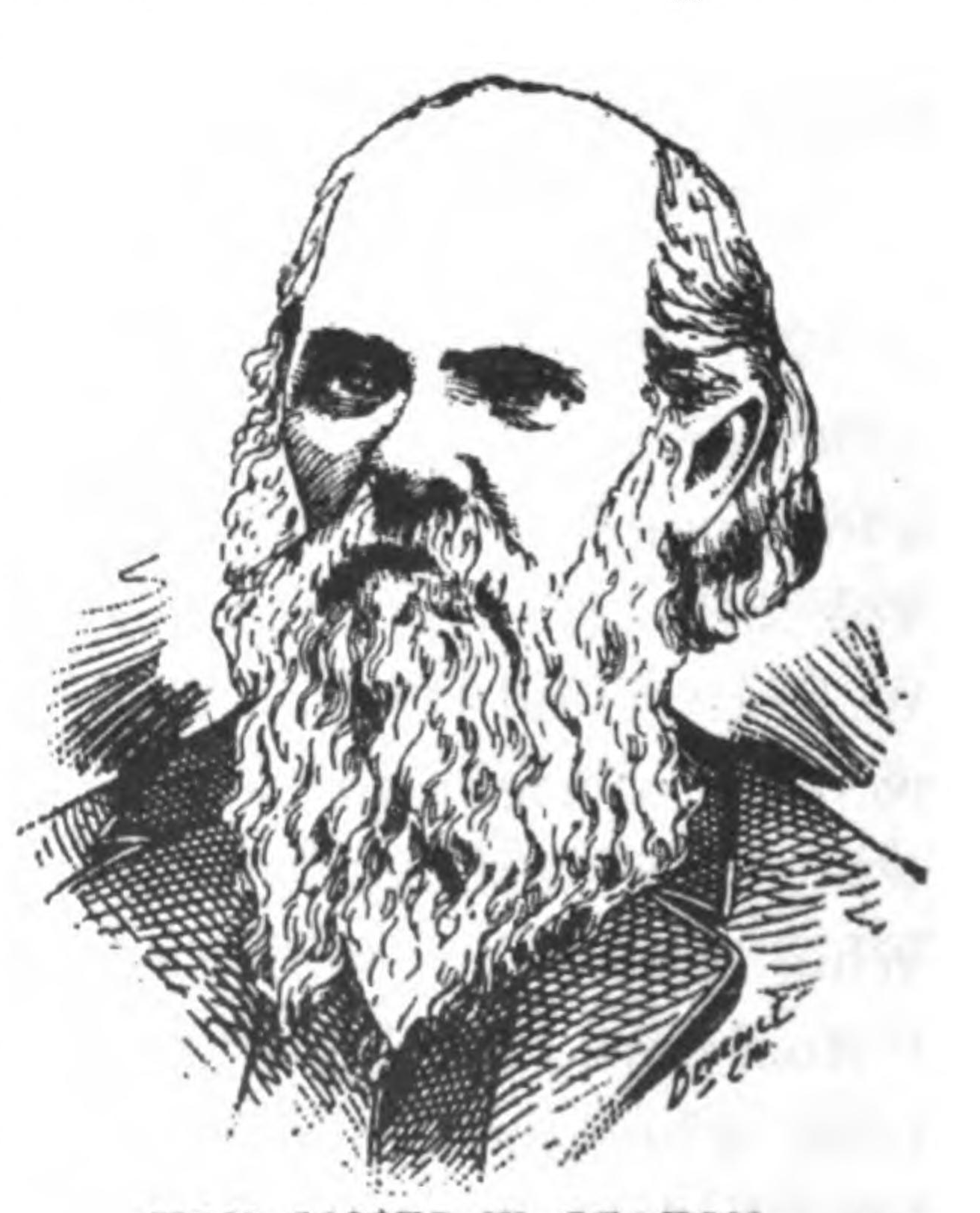
- Portrait from History of Grant County Wisconsin (1900)

Member of the Wisconsin Senate from the 16th district
- In office June 8, 1853 – January 2, 1854
- Preceded by: Joel C. Squires
- Succeeded by: Nelson Dewey

Member of the Wisconsin State Assembly from the Grant 2nd district
- In office January 3, 1859 – January 7, 1861
- Preceded by: Henry Patch
- Succeeded by: Henry L. Massey

Personal details
- Born: May 28, 1824 New Hartford, New York, U.S.
- Died: February 11, 1904 (aged 79) Potosi, Wisconsin, U.S.
- Resting place: Van Buren Cemetery, Potosi, Wisconsin
- Party: Democratic
- Spouse: Amanda F. Bushee
- Children: Mary A. (Husted)

James Wilson Seaton (May 28, 1824 – February 11, 1904) was an American lawyer, Democratic politician, and Wisconsin pioneer. He served in the Wisconsin State Senate and Assembly, representing Grant County.

== Biography ==
Born in New Hartford, New York, Seaton studied at Cazenovia Seminary in Cazenovia, New York. He then studied law in Rome, New York. In 1847, he moved to Potosi, in the Wisconsin Territory, where he was admitted to the Wisconsin bar and practiced law. He was also in the mercantile and insurance business.

He was editor of the Potosi Republican until 1855, when he was succeeded by Edwin R. Paul, and he wrote several articles about the history of Grant County, Wisconsin.

Seaton served in the town government and on the Grant County Board of Supervisors and was chairman of the county board. He served in the Wisconsin State Senate for part of 1853, winning a special election to fill the remainder of the 1853 term after the resignation of Joel C. Squires. He later served in the Wisconsin State Assembly in 1859 and 1860. He was a member of the Democratic Party.

Seaton died in Potosi, Wisconsin.
