= Malvin (disambiguation) =

Malvin may refer to:

- Malvin, a naturally occurring chemical of the anthocyanin family
- Malvín and Malvín Norte, two neighborhoods of Montevideo, Uruguay
- Malvin (given name)
- Club Malvín, a sports club from Montevideo, Uruguay
- Roger Malvin's Burial, one of the lesser known short stories by Nathaniel Hawthorne
