= Sylvester John Hemleben =

American poet

Sylvester John Hemleben (25 February 1902 in La Crosse, Wisconsin – 14 June 1991) is a descendant of a German family that immigrated to America to practice medicine and pharmacy in pioneer Wisconsin.

== Early life ==
Hemleben earned a Bachelor of Arts and Master of Arts degrees from the University of Iowa, a Doctor of Philosophy degree in political science from Fordham University, and Bachelor of Laws with distinction and Juris Doctor degrees from the University of Mississippi. He later attended Columbia University, Harvard University, the University of Cambridge, England, and the Ludwig-Maximilians-Universität München, Germany.

== Career ==
Hemleben’s career was devoted to teaching. He served as head of the department of history and social studies in the School of Education at Fordham University. He taught history, law, and political science at the University of Southwest Louisiana, Brevard College, and the University of Mississippi School of Law. Hemleben was a Fellow of the Royal Historical Society. His books include Plans for World Peace through Six Centuries. He published many journal articles. Hemleben wrote numerous volumes of poetry, including Musings of a Mystic.

Hemleben died on June 14, 1991.
