= Erik Call =

American cinematographer, writer, photographer and actor (Born 1981)

- Born: May 12, 1981 (age 45)
- Occupations: cinematographer, writer, photographer

Erik Call, born on May 12, 1981, in La Crosse, Wisconsin, is an American cinematographer, writer, photographer and actor.

Erik Call is of Norwegian descent, and wrote the script for the TV series Møkkakaffe which aired on the Norwegian broadcasting service NRK in November and December 2013. The Norwegian title translates roughly as Bad coffee. The series consists of seven episodes, and evolves around two men who are hospitalized after a severe car accident. Their families are summoned to the hospital, and fail to understand how the two men found themselves in the same car to begin with. The dialogue is conducted partly in sign language (Norwegian sign language, as opposed to American sign language), partly in Norwegian.

In 2016, the NRK showed a documentary programme called Eriks arv (English: "Erik's inheritance"), in which Call's journey back to his Norwegian forefather's small farm in Norway is documented.

== Filmography ==
=== Writer ===
- 2013: Møkkakaffe (TV series)
- 2013: Baby I Try for You (Tim Sweeney) (short
- 2012: It's my role! (short)
- 2011: Raw (short)
- 2009: Glee (video short)
- 2004: Rangeland Romances (short)

=== Editor ===
- 2013: California School for the Deaf (documentary)
- 2013: Baby I Try for You (Tim Sweeney) (short)
- 2011: Raw (short)
- 2009: Glee (video short)
