= Orville Buckner =

American boxer

Orville Buchner (born January 17, 1936) is an American retired professional boxer who competed in the welterweight division during the early 1960s. Originally from La Crosse, Wisconsin, Buchner was known for his technical skill and determination in the ring, balancing his athletic pursuits with a full-time job in hospitality.

== Early life and amateur career ==
Buchner was born in La Crosse, where he began boxing in local Golden Gloves tournaments. He later served in the United States Army, gaining further experience as an amateur fighter. After his military service, he attended the University of Wisconsin–La Crosse, majoring in economics.

== Professional career ==
Buchner moved to Miami Beach, Florida, to pursue professional boxing. He made his debut on August 7, 1961, fighting Dave Gaitor to a four-round draw at the Sir John Club in Miami. A month later, he knocked out Gaitor in the second round.

After a draw with Hilton Lumpkin, Buchner earned four consecutive victories. His first professional loss came by decision to Ray Lavarro on April 19, 1962, at the Little River Auditorium. He later avenged his earlier draw against Lumpkin with a fifth-round TKO on August 23, 1962.

One of Buchner's most notable bouts came on October 4, 1962, when he held veteran Duane Simpson to a draw, surprising many in the local boxing community.

== Style and personal life ==
Though not a heavy puncher, Buchner was respected for his footwork, endurance, and tactical skill. Throughout his boxing career, he worked as a hotel auditor in Miami Beach to support himself.

His unofficial professional record stands at 11 wins, 4 losses, and 4 draws.

== Professional boxing record ==
21 fights	12 wins	4 losses
By knockout	7	1
Draws	5	

No.	Result	Record	Opponent	Type	Round, time	Date	Age	Location	Notes
21	Loss	12–4–5	Buddy Cooper	PTS	6	Sep 1963	27	Auditorium, Miami Beach, Florida, U.S.	
20	Win	12–3–5	Jim Henry	KO	2	Aug 1963	27	Little River Auditorium, Miami, Florida, U.S.	Henry's pro debut
19	Win	11–3–5	Hilton Lumpkin	KO	2	Aug 1963	27	Little River Auditorium, Miami, Florida, U.S.	
18	Draw	10–3–5	Willie Thomas	PTS	6	Jul 1963	27	Little River Auditorium, Miami, Florida, U.S.	
17	Win	10–3–4	Willie Thomas	TKO	3	May 1963	27	Little River Auditorium, Miami, Florida, U.S.	
16	Loss	9–3–4	Cassius Ford	PTS	6	Dec 1962	26	Auditorium, Miami Beach, Florida, U.S.	
15	Draw	9–2–4	Cassius Ford	PTS	6	Nov 1962	26	Little River Auditorium, Miami, Florida, U.S.	
14	Win	9–2–3	Harry Bellefonte	TKO	2	Nov 1962	26	Auditorium, Miami Beach, Florida, U.S.	
13	Win	8–2–3	Harry Bellefonte	KO	2	Oct 1962	26	Little River Auditorium, Miami, Florida, U.S.	
12	Win	7–2–3	Jack Daniels	KO	1	Oct 1962	26	Little River Auditorium, Miami, Florida, U.S.	
11	Draw	6–2–3	Dwaine Simpson	PTS	4	Oct 1962	26	Little River Auditorium, Miami, Florida, U.S.	
10	Win	6–2–2	Hilton Lumpkin	TKO	5	Aug 1962	26	Little River Auditorium, Miami, Florida, U.S.	
9	Loss	5–2–2	Moses Shaw	PTS	6	May 1962	26	Auditorium, Miami Beach, Florida, U.S.	
8	Loss	5–1–2	Ray Lavarro	UD	4	Apr 1962	26	Little River Auditorium, Miami, Florida, U.S.	
7	Win	5–0–2	Dave Gaitor	TKO	2	Oct 1961	25	Sir John Club, Miami, Florida, U.S.	
6	Win	4–0–2	Ronnie Bridges	KO	1	Oct 1961	25	Sir John Club, Miami, Florida, U.S.	Bridges' pro debut
5	Win	3–0–2	Mario Vega	KO	1	Oct 1961	25	Little River Auditorium, Miami, Florida, U.S.	
4	Win	2–0–2	Jim Flynn	KO	1	Sep 1961	25	Little River Auditorium, Miami, Florida, U.S.	Flynn's pro debut
3	Draw	1–0–2	Hilton Lumpkin	PTS	4	Sep 1961	25	Auditorium, Miami Beach, Florida, U.S.	
2	Win	1–0–1	Dave Gaitor	PTS	4	Sep 1961	25	Little River Auditorium, Miami, Florida, U.S.	
1	Draw	0–0–1	Dave Gaitor	PTS	4	Aug 1961	25	Sir John Club, Miami, Florida, U.S.	Professional debut
