= Wayne J. Hood =

American manufacturer and politician (1913–1988)

Wayne Joris Hood (July 23, 1913 – January 30, 1988) was born in Waupun, Wisconsin. He was a manufacturer in La Crosse, Wisconsin and was active in Republican politics for many years. He served as Wisconsin state chairman of the Republican Party from 1950 to 1953, and was executive director of the Republican National Committee during 1952 and 1953. He was active in Barry Goldwater's 1964 campaign and Richard Nixon’s 1968 campaign.
