= Blanche Wilkins Williams =

American educator of deaf students

- Born: December 1, 1876; La Crosse, Wisconsin, U.S.
- Died: March 24, 1936 (aged 59); Evanston, Illinois, U.S.
- Resting place: Lincoln Cemetery
- Occupation: Educator

Blanche Wilkins Williams (December 1, 1876 – March 24, 1936) was an American educator of deaf children. In 1893 she became the first African American woman to graduate from the Minnesota State Academy for the Deaf. She was described by a prominent deaf newspaper as "the most accomplished deaf lady of her race in America".

== Early life and education ==
Blanche Hilyard Wilkins was born in La Crosse, Wisconsin, on December 1, 1876. She became deaf at an early age.

Wilkins attended the Minnesota State Academy for the Deaf from 1883 to 1893, and was the first Black woman to graduate from the school. She wrote to Edward Miner Gallaudet several times, asking for information on admission to Gallaudet College, but she was rejected; Gallaudet would not admit a Black student until 1950.

== Career ==
Williams joined the literary department of the North Carolina School for the Colored Deaf and Blind in Raleigh in 1895. In 1897 she was paid a salary of $250 in that role. Wilkins and other Black deaf teachers were role models for their students, demonstrating that deaf people could assume leadership positions.

In 1898, Williams resigned her position at the North Carolina School for the Deaf to take a new teaching role at the School for the Colored Deaf and Blind in Austin, Texas, working there a year before returning to Raleigh. In 1899 Wilkins married Charles N. Williams, the hearing African American principal of the North Carolina school. She organized a new department for the Raleigh school, teaching sewing and dressmaking to deaf students and crocheting and knitting to blind students. Her husband died suddenly in 1907, leaving her with two children to raise. Wilkins applied for a position with the Maryland School for the Deaf in 1910, but was rejected as the school wrote that they did "not believe in the social equality of colored and white people." Around 1918, Wilkins moved the family to Chicago.

While in Chicago, Wilkins worked in several factory jobs, including doing beadwork, lampshade work, and power machine sewing. She continued to teach young deaf black children as well, working at a school for the deaf in Chicago. She married her second husband, Thomas Flowers, in 1920; they had worked together in Raleigh and were both widowers. Along with her second husband, she was active in missionary work in the Chicago area.

Wilkins died in Evanston, Illinois on March 24, 1936, and is buried in Lincoln Cemetery near Chicago.

== Legacy ==
Wilkins was the first Black deaf person to serve on the executive committee of the National Association of the Deaf (NAD). This was unusual as Black people were not permitted to be NAD members until 1965.

The newspaper The Silent Worker ran a feature article on Wilkins in 1926, saying "[...] thanks to the excellent educational advantages, under able instructors, which she enjoyed at Faribault, she became the most accomplished deaf lady of her race in America."

In 2018 a newly built student dormitory at the Minnesota State Academy for the Deaf was named Wilkins Hall in her honor.
