= James Giddings =

American politician

James Giddings (fl. 1850s) was a Democratic member of the Wisconsin State Senate during the 1850 and 1851 sessions. Giddings represented the 10th District. His address was listed as being in Chester, Wisconsin.
