= New Gairlock, Nova Scotia =

Community in Nova Scotia, Canada

Coordinates: 45°28′50.14″N 62°49′50.92″W

New Gairloch in Nova Scotia

New Gairloch, is a community in the Canadian province of Nova Scotia, located in Pictou County. It was named for Gairloch in Scotland.
