= National Reserve Corps =

- Korps Nationale Reserve
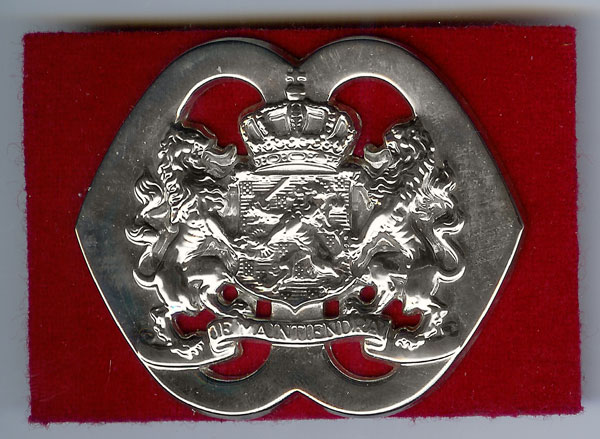
- Cap badge Korps Nationale Reserve
- Active: 1914–present
- Country: Netherlands
- Branch: Army
- Type: Infantry
- Role: Security duties Disaster relief Ceremonial duties
- Size: 3 regional battalions 3,800 men
- Part of: Brigade designated region
- Nickname(s): Infanterie Bewaken Beveiligen; Korps Nationale Reserve IBB
- Motto(s): Als 't moet! ('When necessary!')
- March: Defileermars Korps Nationale Reserve

Commanders
- Current commander: Lieutenant colonel Hans Berding

The National Reserve Corps (Dutch: Korps Nationale Reserve, abbreviated Natres) is a part of the Royal Netherlands Army. NATRES is a corps in the sense that it has a specialized task. The reservist is part of the military, just like all Dutch military personnel, but mostly working parttime or sometimes full time as a replacement for regulars.

== History ==
Since the 13th century, the Dutch government has relied on voluntary armed citizens to defend their homes and to maintain public order. At first this task was carried out by so-called 'shooter guilds'. In the 16th century the voluntary armed citizens, under the influence of William I, Prince of Orange, were organised into militias. These militias were dissolved in 1908.

The outbreak of the First World War and the growing foreign threat lead to the formation of a new unit called the 'Voluntary Landstorm' on the 4 August 1914. At the end of World War I this unit consisted of 6,000 men. In the turbulent times of the Interbellum the Dutch Prime Minister Hendrikus Colijn made the decision to extend the service of this force. At the beginning of World War II this unit consisted of around 98,000 men.

In the years after World War II again the need was felt for a rapidly deployable unit for the defense and security of Dutch territory. While the majority of the Dutch forces then were deployed in Indonesia, the threat of the Soviet Union increased. Therefore, the National Reserve was established on the 14 April 1948. During the Cold War the National Reserve developed into a versatile part of the Royal Dutch Army and received the status of Corps. In the 80s the first women entered the National Reserve Corps. After the Cold War, the Royal Dutch Army changed dramatically in character. Conscription for military service was suspended. The Dutch Army shrank and became more frequently involved in peacekeeping or peace-enforcing missions abroad which resulted in a renewed relevance of the corps.

== Task & roles ==
- General defence of national territory.
- Surveillance and security at strategic objects as bridges, power stations, etc.
- Disaster relief during floods, fire, etc.
- Ceremonial duties, guards of honour.
- Military assistance to civil authorities to maintain public order.
- Assistance of operational units during exercise and missions

Notable actions

- Two Infantry battalions of the corps gave assistance during the flooding of the province of Limburg in 1995;
- In 2014 had his biggest assignment ever, securing the Nuclear Security Summit which was held in The Hague;
- In this same year the corps secured the international morgue where the passengers of the taken down MH-17 were identified.

== Organisation ==
The corps' battalions are based on regions, commanded by operational brigades.

=== 10 Infantry battalion BB KNR ===
Under command of the 43 Mechanised Brigade. Serving in the provinces of Groningen, Friesland, Drenthe, Overijssel, Utrecht and Flevoland.

=== 20 Infantry Battalion BB KNR ===
Under command of the 11 Airmobile Brigade. Serving in the provinces of North Holland, South Holland and Gelderland.

=== 30 Infantry Battalion BB KNR ===
Under command of the 13 Light Brigade. Serving in the provinces of Zeeland, North Brabant and Limburg.

=== Other ===
- National Reserve Korps Fanfare
- The corps' staff and the reservist department are based at the Royal Netherlands Army headquarters;
- The corps has its own museum in Harskamp, the Netherlands.

=== Personnel ===
IBB units and personnel are not deployed abroad as their responsibilities are in the homeland. Individual soldiers (mostly NCO's and officers) are deployed as individual replacements or specialists, but always voluntarily.

== See also ==
- Home Guard
- National Guard (United States)
- Army Reserve (United Kingdom)
- Army Reserve (Ireland)
- United States Army Reserve
- Military reserve force
- Infantry
