= 3rd Wisconsin Infantry Regiment (1898) =

U.S. Volunteer infantry regiment

- Flag of Wisconsin
- Active: May 11, 1898 – January 15, 1899
- Country: United States
- Branch: Infantry
- Size: Regiment
- Engagements: Spanish–American War: Puerto Rico campaign

Commanders
- Colonel: Martin T. Moore

The 3rd Wisconsin Infantry Regiment, reconstituted in 1898, was as an infantry regiment that served in the United States Army during the Spanish–American War. The regiment served in the Puerto Rico campaign.

== Service ==
The 3rd Wisconsin Infantry was mustered into service on May 11, 1898, at Camp Harvey in Milwaukee, Wisconsin, with a strength of 50 officers and 975 enlisted men.

They proceeded to Camp Thomas, near the old Chickamauga battlefield in Tennessee, to prepare for battle in the Caribbean. In June, they were sent to South Carolina to prepare for the invasion of Cuba, but were delayed due to logistical problems and missed the Cuba campaign. Instead, in July 1898, they joined the Puerto Rico campaign. They occupied the cities of Ponce and Coamo, and engaged in skirmishing in that area until the cessation of hostilities in August. During one skirmish, the regiment was fired on by Spanish artillery and suffered two killed.

The 3rd Wisconsin Infantry returned to Wisconsin in October and was mustered out of service on January 15, 1899. At the time of mustering out, the unit consisted of 49 officers and 1,196 enlisted men.

== Casualties ==
The 3rd Wisconsin suffered 2 enlisted men killed in action and 31 enlisted men and 1 officer who died of disease. 26 additional men were discharged for disability or other causes, and 1 man deserted.

== Commanders ==
- Colonel Martin T. Moore

== Notable people ==
- Frank H. Fowler was 2nd lieutenant in Co. M. Later he served as a lieutenant colonel in World War I, and became a Wisconsin state legislator.

== See also ==
- 3rd Wisconsin Infantry Regiment
