= Jim Omerberg =

American politician

Jim Omerberg was a member of the West Virginia House of Delegates.

== Biography ==
Omberberg was born on July 28, 1894, in La Crosse, Wisconsin. During World War I, he served with the United States Army. He was Presbyterian, and died in Franklin County, Ohio on October 14, 1967.

== Political career ==
Omerberg was a member of the House of Delegates from 1959 to 1960. Previously, he unsuccessfully ran for a seat in the House in 1954. He was a Democrat.
