= Barbara Harwerth =

American volleyball player (born 1941)

Barbara Jean Harwerth (born March 6, 1941) is a former volleyball player. Born in La Crosse, Wisconsin, she played for the United States national team at the 1964 Summer Olympics.
