= Richard D. Martin =

American football coach and administrator (1932–2008)

Biographical details
- Born: July 14, 1932; LaCrosse, Wisconsin, U.S.
- Died: March 8, 2008 (aged 75)

Playing career
- 1951–1952: Ottawa (KS)

Coaching career (HC unless noted)
- 1956–1959: Yates Center HS (KS)
- 1960–1963: Olathe HS (KS)
- 1964–1967: Rose Poly
- 1968–1971: Washington University

Administrative career (AD unless noted)
- 1978–1981: West Virginia
- 1981–1985: MVC (commissioner)

Head coaching record
- Overall: 24–43–3 (college)

Accomplishments and honors

Championships
- 1 Prairie (1965); 1 CAC (1970)

Richard D. Martin (July 14, 1932 – March 8, 2008) was an American football coach and college athletics administrator. He served as the head football coach at Rose Polytechnic Institute—now known as Rose-Hulman Institute of Technology—in Terre Haute, Indiana from 1964 to 1967 and Washington University in St. Louis from 1968 to 1971, compiling a career college football coaching record of 24–43–3. Martin was the athletic director at West Virginia University from 1978 to 1981 and the commissioner of the Missouri Valley Conference (MVC) from 1981 to 1985.

== Head coaching record ==
=== College ===
Year	Team	Overall	Conference	Standing	Bowl/playoffs
Rose Poly Engineers (Prairie College Conference) (1964–1967)
1964	Rose Poly	2–6	1–1	2nd	
1965	Rose Poly	5–3	1–1	T–1st	
1966	Rose Poly	3–4–1	1–1	2nd	
1967	Rose Poly	1–6–2	0–1–1	T–2nd	
Rose Poly:		11–19–3	3–4–1		
Washington University Bears (College Athletic Conference) (1968–1971)
1968	Washington University	2–8	0–4	5th	
1969	Washington University	2–7	1–3	T–4th	
1970	Washington University	5–4	3–1	T–1st	
1971	Washington University	4–5	1–3	T–4th	
Washington University:		13–24	5–11		
Total:		24–43–3			
National championship Conference title Conference division title or championship game berth
