= Merrick Wing =

American politician

Merrick Wing (September 10, 1833 – April 11, 1895) was a member of the Wisconsin State Senate.

Wing was born in Hinsdale, Massachusetts. He attended the University of Michigan Law School and moved to La Crosse, Wisconsin in 1863.

Wing married twice. His first marriage was to Hannah Amanda Palmer on March 22, 1859. They had one daughter. His second marriage was to Emeline Eliza Sherwood on August 29, 1865. They had four children. Wing died on April 11, 1895.

== Career ==
Wing, a Republican, was first elected to the Senate in 1876. After not running for re-election, his seat was won by Gysbert Van Steenwyk, Sr. (also a Republican). In 1880, Wing ran and was re-elected to the Senate. He was succeeded in 1882 by Donald A. McDonald of the Liberal Reform Party.
