= John Shuman =

John Shuman was an officer in the United States Army during World War I. He was awarded the Army Distinguished Service Medal.

His award citation reads:

The President of the United States of America, authorized by Act of Congress, July 9, 1918, takes pleasure in presenting the Army Distinguished Service Medal to Colonel (Infantry) John B. Shuman, United States Army, for exceptionally meritorious and distinguished services to the Government of the United States, in a duty of great responsibility during World War I. In the Adjutant General's Department during the war and the demobilization period, Colonel Shuman's unusual initiative and splendid judgment contributed in a large measure to the successful handling of the commissioned personnel of the Army. He rendered services of great worth.

Shuman's official residence was listed as La Crosse, Wisconsin.
