= Malvin R. Anderson =

American politician

1957 portrait of Anderson

Malvin R. "Moppy" Anderson (May 22, 1894 – December 12, 1986) was an American politician and businessman.

Anderson was born in La Crosse, Wisconsin. He went to the La Crosse Public Schools and to the La Crosse Business College. He moved to Rushford, Minnesota in 1914. Anderson served in the United States Army during World War I. In 1922, Anderson moved to Preston, Minnesota with his wife and family and was involved in the banking business. He served as the Rushford, Minnesota City Treasurer and on the Preston, Minnesota School Board. Anderson served as the Fillmore County Treasurer from 1923 to 1950. He then served in the Minnesota House of Representatives from 1951 to 1962. He died at the Bethesda Nursing Home in Willmar, Minnesota.
