= Robert M. Dammon =

American professor and academic administrator

- Born: 1956 (age 69–70); La Crosse, Wisconsin, U.S.
- Education: University of Wisconsin-Madison; University of Wisconsin-Lacrosse
- Occupations: professor, academic administrator
- Employer: Carnegie Mellon University
- Known for: Dean of the Tepper School of Business

Robert M. Dammon (born 1956) is an American professor and academic administrator. He is the dean of the Tepper School of Business at Carnegie Mellon University.

== Early life ==
Robert M. Dammon was born in 1956 in La Crosse, Wisconsin. He graduated from the University of Wisconsin–Madison in 1978. He went on to earn a master in business administration from its Wisconsin School of Business in 1980 and a PhD in financial economics in 1984.

== Career ==
Dammon joined the faculty at Carnegie Mellon University's Tepper School of Business in 1984. He was a visiting associate professor of financial economics at Duke University's Fuqua School of Business in 1995-1996. He returned to Tepper, where he was appointed as the associate dean for education in 2008, and he became the dean in 2011. Under his tenure, Dammon suggested he would keep the quantitative focus of the curriculum and expand fundraising among its alumni. For the 2018-2019 academic year, Dammon pioneered a rebranding effort with the opening of the Tepper Quad. According to a source from the Tepper website, Dammon said that “Our new brand identity does not change our distinctive approach; rather, it has been specifically developed to reflect our strategic direction as the business school of the future, pioneering the interdisciplinary approach needed to meet today’s business challenges that fall outside the traditional boundaries of academic disciplines."

Dammon is a member of the American Finance Association, the American Economic Association and the Society for Financial Studies. He has published research in academic journals like The Journal of Finance, The Review of Financial Studies, The American Economic Review.
