= Henry Nein =

American politician

Henry Nein (June 7, 1860 – November 12, 1933) was an American railroad engineer and politician.

== Biography ==
Nein was born on June 7, 1860, in Wenings, Germany. He emigrated with his parents to the United States in 1870 and settled in La Crosse, Wisconsin. He went to public school and then worked in the saw mills. Nein was a railroad engineer for the Chicago, Milwaukee & St. Paul Railroad. In November 1922, he was elected to the Wisconsin State Assembly as a Republican. He received 4,481 votes to his opponent Henry N. Stephenson's 493 votes. Nein died in La Crosse from a long illness on November 12, 1933.
