= Carl Kurtenacker =

American politician (1856–1943)

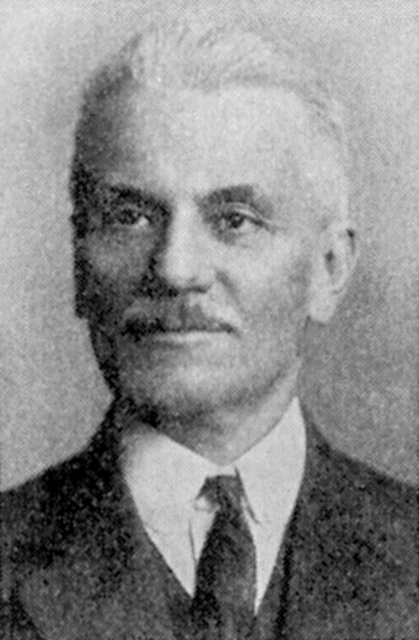
- Portrait of Carl Kurtenacker
- Born: February 24, 1856
- Died: December 15, 1943 (aged 87)
- Occupations: Businessman, politician

Carl Kurtenacker (February 24, 1856 – December 15, 1943) was an American businessman and politician.

Born in Germany, Kurtenacker immigrated to the United States in 1869 and settled in La Crosse, Wisconsin in 1872. He was a printer and was in the book, newspaper, and stationery business. He was an executive for the John Gund Brewery Company and retired in 1918. Kurtenecker served as clerk of the Wisconsin Circuit Court for the La Crosse County, Wisconsin and was a tax commissioner. Kurtenacker served in the Wisconsin State Assembly in 1917 and 1919 and was a Republican. Kurtenacker died in La Crosse, Wisconsin.
