= Quiggle =

Quiggle is a surname. Notable people with the surname include:

- Dave Quiggle, American punk musician
- James W. Quiggle (1820–1878), American railroad magnate, politician and diplomat
- Lynne C. Quiggle (1906–1958), rear admiral of the United States Navy
- Donna and Floyd Quiggle, victims of the 1967 Clinton County, Pennsylvania shootings
