= USS Admiral Hugh Rodman =

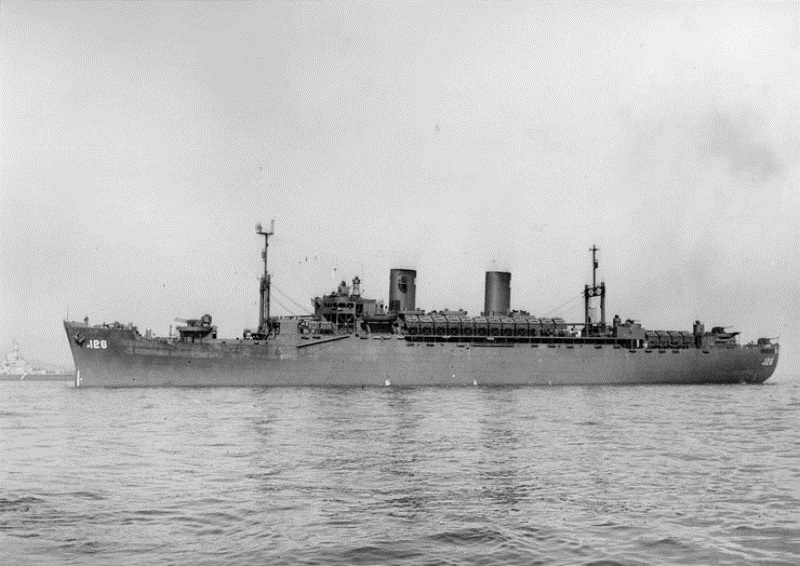
- USS Admiral Hugh Rodman (AP-126) in San Francisco Bay, California.

History

United States
- Name: USS Admiral Hugh Rodman (AP-126)
- Namesake: Admiral Hugh Rodman, US Navy
- Builder: Bethlehem Shipbuilding Corporation
- Laid down: 24 April 1944
- Launched: 25 February 1945
- Commissioned: 7 July 1945
- Identification: IMO number: 8332863
- Renamed: USAT General Maurice Rose, 1 August 1946
- Namesake: General Maurice Rose, US Army
- Renamed: USNS General Maurice Rose (T-AP-126), 1 March 1950
- Decommissioned: Transferred to the permanent custody of the Maritime Administration (MARAD), 30 June 1970
- Stricken: 20 August 1990
- Fate: Scrapped 1997

General characteristics
- Class & type: Admiral W. S. Benson-class transport
- Displacement: 9,676 tons dockside; 20,120 tons fully laden
- Length: 608 feet 11 inches (185.60 m)
- Beam: 75 feet 6 inches (23.01 m)
- Draft: 26 feet 6 inches (8.08 m)
- Installed power: 19,000 shp
- Propulsion: turbo-electric transmission, twin screw
- Speed: 19 knots (35 km/h)
- Capacity: 100,000 cubic feet (2,800 m^{3}) of cargo
- Troops: 5,200
- Crew: 618
- Armament: 4 × 5"/38 caliber gun mounts; 8 × twin Bofors 40 mm gun mounts; 14 × twin Oerlikon 20 mm cannon gun mounts

USS Admiral Hugh Rodman (AP-126) was an Admiral W. S. Benson-class transport: Laid down, on 24 April 1944, as a Maritime Commission type (P2-SE2-R1) hull, under Maritime Commission contract, (MC hull 684), at Bethlehem Shipbuilding Corporation, Alameda, California; launched on 25 February 1945; commissioned as the USS Admiral Hugh Rodman (AP-126), 7 July 1945, decommissioned on 14 May 1946, at New York; transferred to the U.S. Army Transportation Service in May 1946; commissioned USAT General Maurice Rose on 1 August 1946; reacquired by the United States Navy and assigned to the Military Sea Transport Service (MSTS); placed in service as USNS General Maurice Rose (T-AP-126) on 1 March 1950.

== World War II Pacific Theatre operations ==
Assigned to the United States Pacific Fleet, the transport departed San Francisco, on 21 July 1945 for a shakedown cruise which took her to San Diego and Los Angeles. She returned to her home port on 16 August – two days after hostilities with Japan ended – and embarked fresh troops to replace veterans in the Far East. She transited the Golden Gate on 21 August and proceeded via Ulithi to the Philippines. Following stops at San Pedro Bay, Leyte, Batangas and Manila, Luzon, she headed home and reached San Francisco early in October.

Then, following a second round-trip voyage to the Philippines, she again got underway from San Francisco in December and set course for Nagoya, Japan. This shuttle run ended in Los Angeles on 3 January 1946. Another voyage to Yokohama took her back to Seattle, Washington. Early in March, she sailed from that port with occupation troops and delivered them to Okinawa.

== Transferred to the US Army ==
From that island in the Ryukyu Islands, the ship sailed, via the Panama Canal, for the East Coast of the United States. She reached New York on 14 May, was decommissioned on that day, and was transferred to the War Department later that month. The ship entered the Bethlehem New York yard at 56th Street on 3 June to receive the repairs and modifications she would require upon assuming a slightly different role. She got underway again on 1 August and served the U.S. Army Transport Service as General Maurice Rose until she and her sister United States Army transports were transferred to the U.S. Navy on 1 March 1950 to serve in the recently established Military Sea Transportation Service.

== Transferred to the US Navy ==
She was given the classification T-AP-126 at that time. Crewed by civilians, General Maurice Rose operated out of New York in the Atlantic and the Mediterranean during the next 15 years.

== Transporting soldiers and refugees ==
Steaming primarily between New York and Bremerhaven, Germany, she completed more than 150 round-trip voyages while carrying military dependents and European refugees and rotating combat-ready troops. In addition, the ship deployed to the Mediterranean 17 times to support U.S. 6th Fleet operations. Following the Hungarian revolution in October 1956, she completed three runs to Bremerhaven and back between 12 January and 27 March 1957 transporting Hungarian refugees to the United States. On three occasions between 1 April and 5 October, General Maurice Rose was dispatched to the eastern Mediterranean to support units of the U.S. 6th Fleet responding to political crises in Jordan. The ship was still transporting troops between New York and Bremerhaven in June 1959.

== Vietnam operations ==
In 1965, however, America's increased involvement in the war in South Vietnam beckoned the transport toward a new theater of operations. After completing nine voyages to Bremerhaven and back between 16 January and 4 August 1965, General Maurice Rose departed New York on 14 August for transport duty to Southeast Asia. She sailed via Long Beach, and Pearl Harbor to Qui Nhon, South Vietnam, where she arrived on 14 September and began debarking troops and supplies. After departing Vietnam on the 19th, she steamed via Okinawa and the West Coast of the United States and reached New York on 18 October.

During the first eight months of 1966, she made eight round-trip runs to Europe and back. On 8 September, she again departed New York for troop lift duty to South Vietnam. She operated in the western Pacific supporting US forces in Southeast Asia through the end of 1966. She returned to New York late in January 1967 for an overhaul and was placed in ready reserve status. As such she was laid up at the Cavin Point Army Depot in New York harbor.

The ship was transferred to the permanent custody of the Maritime Administration (MARAD) on 30 June 1970 and shifted to the National Defense Reserve Fleet, James River, Fort Eustis, Virginia. She was struck from the Naval Register, on 20 August 1990 and sold by the Maritime Administration in June 1997 for scrapping at Brownsville, Texas.
