= John W. Wilcox Jr. =

United States Navy admiral (1882–1942)

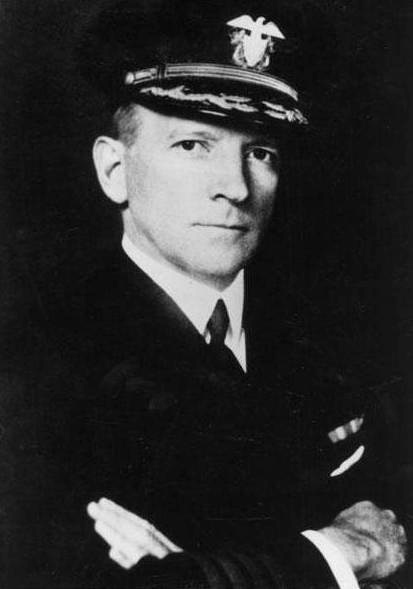
- John W. Wilcox Jr., photographed as a captain
- Born: 22 March 1882; Midway, Georgia, U.S.
- Died: 27 March 1942 (aged 60); North Atlantic Ocean
- Burial place: Lost at sea
- Military career
- Allegiance: United States
- Branch: United States Navy
- Service years: 1905–1942
- Rank: Rear admiral
- Commands: USS Yacona (SP-617); USS Boggs (DD-136); USS Hopkins (DD-249); USS Camden (AS-6); Special Service Squadron; President, Board of Inspection and Survey; Battleship Division 6; Battleships, United States Atlantic Fleet; Task Force 39
- Conflicts: World War I; Atlantic U-boat Campaign; World War II; Battle of the Atlantic
- Awards: Navy Cross; World War I Victory Medal; American Defense Service Medal; American Campaign Medal; European–African–Middle Eastern Campaign Medal; World War II Victory Medal

John Walter Wilcox Jr. (22 March 1882 – 27 March 1942) was a rear admiral of the United States Navy. He saw service in World War I and in the opening weeks of United States involvement in World War II before being lost overboard from his flagship in the North Atlantic Ocean in 1942.

== Early life ==
Midshipman Wilcox's photograph in the 1905 edition of the Lucky Bag.

Wilcox was born in Midway, Georgia, on 22 March 1882. Appointed from Georgia, he was admitted to the United States Naval Academy in Annapolis, Maryland, on 21 May 1901, and began his schooling there on 21 June 1901. The 1905 edition of the school yearbook, the Lucky Bag, described him as cheerful and polite, successful in all his endeavors except the academic study of mathematics, and an expert ice skater, and it listed his activities as including baseball, American football, gymnastics, riflery — he was a skilled rifle marksman — and various social positions. He graduated as a member of the class of 1905. Among his classmates were several future World War II admirals including: Harold G. Bowen Sr., Arthur B. Cook, Wilhelm L. Friedell, William R. Furlong, Stanford C. Hooper, Royal E. Ingersoll, Byron McCandless, Herbert F. Leary, John H. Newton, Chester W. Nimitz, Harry E. Shoemaker, John M. Smeallie, and Walter B. Woodson.

== Naval career ==
=== Early career ===
On 23 February 1905, Wilcox reported aboard the new armored cruiser USS West Virginia for his first tour of duty. During his tour aboard her, West Virginia conducted training operations initially as part of the United States Asiatic Fleet, which in early 1907 was downgraded in status to that of First Squadron of the Pacific Fleet. After performing the then-mandatory two years of sea duty as a midshipman, he was promoted to ensign on 31 January 1907. By the beginning of 1909 he had transferred to the patrol yacht Scorpion, which was operating in the Mediterranean. He was promoted to lieutenant (junior grade) on 31 January 1910 and by the beginning of 1911 was serving aboard the battleship USS Georgia, which conducted peacetime training during his tour. He received a promotion to lieutenant on 9 January 1911 while aboard Georgia.

Wilcox completed his tour aboard Georgia in May 1911, and on 5 September 1911 he reported for duty on the staff of the U.S. Naval Academy. He then returned to sea, transferring on 2 June 1913 to the gunboat USS Dolphin, which as the flagship of the Third Squadron arrived in the spring of 1914 in Tampico, Mexico, to protect American lives and property, resulting in the Tampico Affair and the United States occupation of Veracruz. In 1915, he transferred to the battleship USS Virginia, which operated along the East Coast of the United States until going into reserve for an overhaul early in 1916. Wilcox completed his tour aboard her in May 1916. He began duty at the New York Navy Yard in Brooklyn, New York, on 13 June 1916.

=== World War I ===
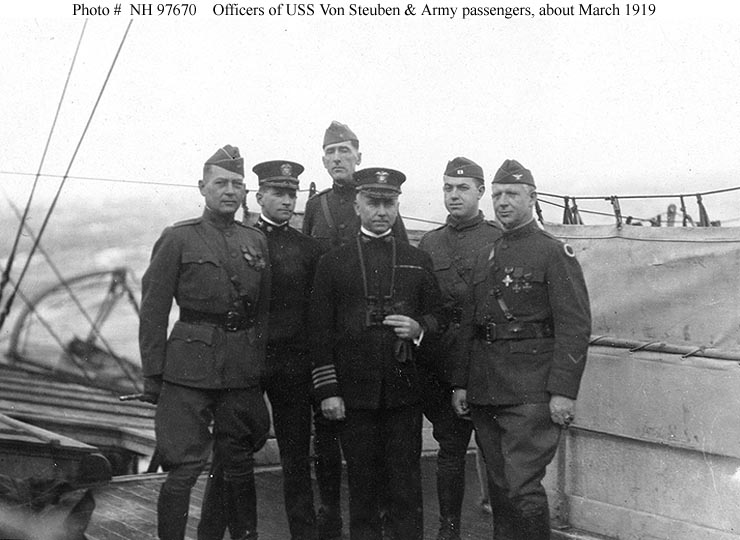
Aboard the U.S. Navy troop transport USS Von Steuben (ID-3017), Commander John W. Wilcox Jr. (second from left), the ship's executive officer, poses with commanding officer Captain Cyrus R. Miller (center) and four unidentified United States Army officers, ca. March 1919.

While Wilcox was at the New York Navy Yard, the United States entered World War I on 6 April 1917. He was promoted to lieutenant commander on 23 May 1917. Late in 1917, he left the navy yard to become the first commanding officer of the armed yacht USS Yacona (SP-617) when she was commissioned on 10 December 1917 for World War I convoy escort and antisubmarine duty in the Atlantic Ocean.

By March 1918, Wilcox was flag secretary on the staff of commander, Battleship Force 2, United States Atlantic Fleet, and he received the Navy Cross for distinguished service during that duty. On 1 July 1918, he received a promotion to a temporary wartime rank of commander. The war ended on 11 November 1918, and by the beginning of 1919, Wilcox was the executive officer of the troop transport USS Von Steuben (ID-3017), engaged in bringing American servicemen home from Europe in the immediate aftermath of the war.

=== Interwar ===
By the beginning of 1920 Wilcox was serving on the staff of Destroyer Squadron Four in the Pacific Fleet. By the beginning of 1921 he had become commanding officer of the Pacific Fleet destroyer USS Boggs (DD-136). Toward the end of his tour aboard Boggs he was promoted to the permanent rank of commander on 3 June 1921, and he detached from Boggs on 21 June 1921. He assumed duties at the Philadelphia Navy Yard in Philadelphia, Pennsylvania, on 11 July 1921.

Wilcox reported to the Naval War College in Newport, Rhode Island, on 23 June 1923 as a student. After completing his classes, he took command of the destroyer USS Hopkins (DD-249) on 4 June 1924. She operated off New England, off Charleston, South Carolina, and in the Caribbean under his command. By the beginning of 1926, he was serving on the staff of the commander, Destroyer Squadrons, Scouting Fleet. Completing this duty in July 1926, he returned to the Naval War College on 12 July 1926 for a tour on its staff. While at the college, he was promoted to captain on 11 December 1928. Wilcox took command of the submarine tender USS Camden (AS-6) on 15 June 1929.

Camden was decommissioned on 26 May 1931. Wilcox detached from her on 31 May 1931 and on 1 July 1931 reported for duty on the staff of the U.S. Naval Academy, where he served as the school's athletic director until 1934. He returned to sea for his next tour, becoming chief of staff to the commander, Cruisers, Scouting Force, on 14 July 1934. Completing that duty in June 1936, he returned to the Naval War College to serve as head of the college's operations department, and on 7 May 1937 he became chief of staff and aide to college president Rear Admiral Charles P. Snyder. During his war college tour, he was promoted to rear admiral on 23 June 1938, and became qualified as a translator or interpreter of French.

On 23 August 1938, Wilcox took command of the Special Service Squadron in the Panama Canal Zone — flying his flag first aboard the gunboat USS Erie (PG-50) and from 14 January 1939 aboard the gunboat USS Charleston (PG-51) — until relieved by Rear Admiral H. Kent Hewitt on 3 August 1940. (Note: The Naval War College on its Web site (see Naval War College Illustrated History and Guide, p. 15) and in its centennial history (see Hattendorf, John B., B. Mitchell Simpson, III and John R. Wadleigh. Sailors and Scholars: The Centennial History of the U.S. Naval War College. Newport, Rhode Island: Naval War College Press, 1984, p. 328.) states that from 27 May 1939 to 30 June 1939 "Captain J. W. Wilcox" served as acting president of the college between the departure of outgoing college president Rear Admiral Charles P. Snyder and the arrival of incoming president Rear Admiral Edward C. Kalbfus. This appears to refer to John W. Wilcox, although he was a rear admiral and serving a tour as commander of the Special Service Squadron in the Panama Canal Zone at that time.) Wilcox was President of the Board of Inspection and Survey from 18 September 1940 to December 1941.

=== World War II ===
Wilcox was the newly appointed commander, Battleships, United States Atlantic Fleet, when the United States entered World War II on 7 December 1941. He came aboard his flagship, the battleship USS Washington (BB-56), in Virginia's York River, to take up his duties on 13 December 1941, simultaneously also taking command of Battleship Division 6. Washington conducted training along the United States East Coast and in the Gulf of Mexico until March 1942.

On 25 March 1942, Wilcox became commander of Task Force 39, consisting of Washington, the aircraft carrier USS Wasp (CV-7), the heavy cruisers USS Tuscaloosa (CA-37) and USS Wichita (CA-45), and eight destroyers. The task force had orders to join the British Home Fleet at Scapa Flow in the Orkney Islands and thereafter assist the Home Fleet in covering Arctic convoys bound for the Soviet Union. With Wilcox aboard Washington, the task force departed Casco Bay, Maine, on 26 March 1942, bound for Scapa Flow.

=== Loss at sea ===
On the morning of 27 March 1942, the second day of the voyage, Wilcox appeared unaccompanied and without a coat on Washington's deck while Task Force 39 was pushing through heavy seas off Sable Island in stormy North Atlantic winter weather. He held a few brief conversations with some of the men on deck before they lost track of his whereabouts. At 10:31, a member of Washington's crew reported a man overboard at 42°24′N 61°34′W and soon thereafter Tuscaloosa sighted a man struggling in the water and took evasive action to avoid running him down. The task force began a search and rescue operation. Mustering of Washington's crew found no one missing from the ship's company or Wilcox's staff, and it gradually became apparent that Wilcox himself had gone overboard.

Wasp launched four SB2U-2 Vindicator dive bombers to assist in the search, one of which crashed astern of Wasp while attempting to land, killing its two-man crew. About 80 minutes after Wilcox went overboard, the destroyer USS Livermore (DD-429) sighted his body floating face down in the rough seas, but the bad weather prevented its recovery, and it was never seen again. Task Force 39 soon suspended its search and resumed its voyage to Scapa Flow.

=== Board of investigation ===
Immediately after Wilcox's death, Rear Admiral Robert C. Giffen aboard Wichita took command of Task Force 39. He ordered a board of investigation into the loss of Wilcox to convene aboard Washington on the afternoon of 27 March 1942. It examined 43 witnesses over the next seven days. No one had seen how Wilcox had gone overboard. The heavy seas that morning could simply have swept him overboard, but the board explored other possibilities. Witnesses disagreed on Wilcox's mental state; there were claims that he seemed sad or nervous on the morning of 27 March and that he had exhibited unstable behavior in recent days, but these were balanced by other witnesses who said he seemed of sound mind and that, although he was known to exhibit eccentricities not common among officers of his grade, his behavior otherwise was not unusual on the morning of his death. One witness believed that Wilcox seemed pale and white during his last few minutes on deck and perhaps was ill, leading to speculation that he may have suffered a heart attack while on deck and fallen overboard.

Many rumors circulated in the aftermath of Wilcox's death, including that he had been suicidal and had jumped overboard or that someone pushed him overboard, but none of these ideas could be substantiated. When the board concluded its proceedings on 2 April 1942, it found that no one aboard Washington had been negligent in Wilcox's death and that Wilcox had not died owing to any misconduct of his own. Decades later, a new hypothesis surfaced based on the reports of Wilcox seeming pale and white while on deck on the morning of 27 March, speculating that he may have been seasick and had rushed to the ship's side to vomit, but had mistakenly selected an area where lifelines were not rigged, falling overboard as a result. Wilcox was the first U.S. Navy admiral — and one of only two (Note: The only other U.S. Navy admiral lost at sea was Rear Admiral Lynne C. Quiggle, who disappeared from the ocean liner President Cleveland in July 1958. (See usnamemorialhall.org Virtual Memorial Hall: JOHN W. WILCOX, JR., RADM, USN and usnamemorialhall.org Virtual Memorial Hall: LYNNE C. QUIGGLE, RADM, USN)) — ever lost at sea.

== Memorial ==
Although Wilcox's body was not recovered from the Atlantic for burial, a memorial marker for him is located at Memory Hill Cemetery in Milledgeville, Georgia.

== Awards ==
- Navy Cross
- World War I Victory Medal
- American Defense Service Medal
- American Campaign Medal
- European–African–Middle Eastern Campaign Medal
- World War II Victory Medal
