= USS Admiral R. E. Coontz =

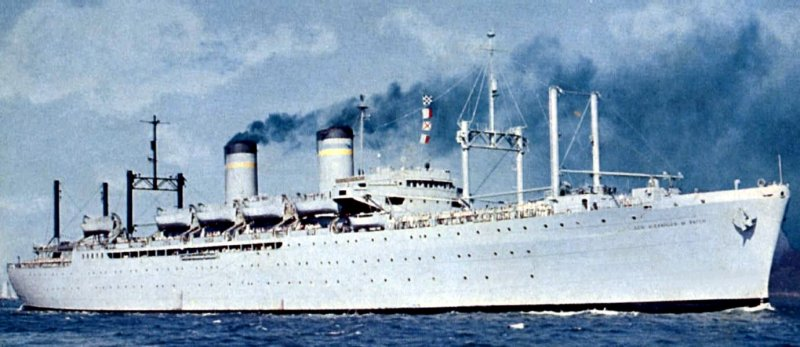

History

United States
- Name: USS Admiral R. E. Coontz (AP-122)
- Namesake: Admiral Robert Coontz, US Navy
- Builder: Bethlehem-Alameda Shipyard Inc., Alameda, California
- Laid down: 15 January 1943
- Launched: 22 April 1944
- Sponsored by: Mrs. Edwin Kokko
- Commissioned: 21 November 1944
- Renamed: USAT General Alexander M. Patch, circa April 1946
- Namesake: General Alexander M. Patch, US Army
- Renamed: USNS General Alexander M. Patch (T-AP-122), 3 March 1950
- Out of service: 1967
- Stricken: 20 August 1990
- Identification: IMO number: 8424513
- Fate: Sold for scrapping, 4 June 2001, to Esco Marine Inc., Brownsville, Texas

General characteristics
- Class & type: Admiral W. S. Benson-class transport
- Displacement: 9,676 tons dockside; 20,120 tons fully laden
- Length: 608 feet 11 inches (185.60 m)
- Beam: 75 feet 6 inches (23.01 m)
- Draft: 26 feet 6 inches (8.08 m)
- Installed power: 19,000 shp
- Propulsion: turbo-electric transmission, twin screw
- Speed: 19 knots (35 km/h)
- Capacity: 100,000 cubic feet (2,800 m^{3}) of cargo
- Troops: 5,200
- Complement: officers – 32; enlisted – 324
- Armament: 4 × 5-inch/38-caliber gun mounts; 8 × twin Bofors 40 mm gun mounts; 14 × twin Oerlikon 20 mm cannon gun mounts

USS Admiral R. E. Coontz (AP-122) (later the USNS General Alexander M. Patch (T-AP-122)) was an Admiral W. S. Benson-class transport built for the U.S. Navy during World War II. She was laid down under a Maritime Commission contract (MC hull 680) on 15 January 1943 at Alameda, California, by the Bethlehem Steel Corp., and launched on 22 April 1944. She was sponsored by Mrs. Edwin Kokko, daughter of Admiral Coontz, and commissioned on 21 November 1944.

After service in both the Pacific and European Theaters of World War II, the Coontz was decommissioned and stricken from the Navy list in April 1946. Turned over to the U.S. War Department, she underwent repairs and alterations and was renamed General Alexander M. Patch, honoring General Alexander McCarrell Patch, commander of the victorious U.S. Army XIV Corps at Guadalcanal, and of the Seventh Army in the invasion of Southern France in 1944 and Germany in 1945.

In the Army Transport Service she carried troops and cargo between Europe and the United States through 1950, rescued refugees during the Suez Crisis of 1956, made nearly 125 round-trips to West Germany in the early 1960s, in part helping to break the Berlin Blockade, then carried troops mid-decade on numerous trips to South Vietnam and from South Korea to South Vietnam in support of U.S. military operations in Southeast Asia.

Placed in reserve in 1967, the Patch was transferred to the U.S. Maritime Administration in 1970 and placed in reserve in the United States National Defense Reserve Fleet in the James River, Virginia. In June 2001 she was sold to Esco Marine, Inc., of Brownsville, Texas, for scrapping.

== History ==
=== In World War II ===
Following shakedown training out of San Pedro, California, the transport embarked troops at San Francisco and sailed for the western Pacific on 3 January 1945. After pausing briefly at Pearl Harbor she reached Ulithi, in the Western Carolines, on 23 January and served there as station ship until 19 March when she headed homeward. Admiral R. E. Coontz made one additional voyage from San Francisco to Ulithi. On her return she touched at San Francisco and San Diego, transited the Panama Canal, and pushed on across the Atlantic to France. She embarked troops for transfer to the Pacific theater; cleared Marseille on 21 July; and reached Pearl Harbor on 12 August. Underway soon again, she paused at Eniwetok, Saipan, and Guam en route to Ulithi which she reached on 28 August, almost a fortnight after Japan capitulated.

Leaving the Western Carolines on 12 September, Admiral R. E. Coontz sailed for Okinawa, whence she sailed on 27 September for the west coast of the United States. Making port at Bremerton, Washington, the transport embarked occupation troops before getting underway for Japan on 24 October. After disembarking troops at Nagasaki on 6 November and at Nagoya two days later, Admiral R. E. Coontz then made two round-trip voyages between Yokohama and Seattle. She then proceeded to Okinawa to embark passengers for the return voyage to the United States. Sailing for Hawaii, the transport embarked more troops at Pearl Harbor and reached New York City on 11 March 1946.

=== As General Alexander M. Patch ===
The Coontz entered the Todd Shipyard, Brooklyn, New York, on 17 March 1946 and was decommissioned there on the 25th. Stricken from the Navy list in April 1946 and turned over to the War Department, the ship underwent a period of repairs and alterations and was renamed General Alexander M. Patch, honoring General Alexander McCarrell Patch, commander of the victorious U.S. Army XIV Corps at Guadalcanal, and of the Seventh Army in the invasion of Southern France in 1944 and Germany in 1945.

In the Army Transport Service, General Alexander M. Patch carried troops and cargo between Europe and the United States from 1946 to 1950. Reacquired by the Navy on 3 March 1950, the ship operated for the next two decades as USNS General Alexander M. Patch (T-AP-122) with the Military Sea Transportation Service (MSTS), later renamed the Military Sealift Command(MSC). From 1950 to 1965 the ship conducted 123 round-trip voyages between Bremerhaven and New York, with an additional 16 voyages to the Mediterranean. Among her passengers was Mrs. Alexander M. Patch, the widow of the general for whom the ship had been named.

Among her operations was the embarkation of over 1,500 refugees in the Suez Crisis in November 1956. The transport took them from Souda Bay, Crete—where they had been brought from Alexandria, Egypt, and Haifa, Israel, by American warships – to Naples. Late in 1961, in the international tensions spawned by the Soviet Union's closure of access to West Berlin, General Alexander M. Patch participated in the massive lift of American troops to Europe.

In August 1965, growing American involvement in the Vietnam War prompted the transfer of MSTS ships from the Atlantic to the Pacific. General Alexander M. Patch commenced her first Vietnam voyage at New York on 15 August. Steaming via Charleston, SC, and Long Beach, CA, the transport reached Qui Nhon, South Vietnam, on 16 September. Returning via Cam Ranh Bay, Vung Tau, and Okinawa—to San Francisco on 2 October, the ship conducted one more voyage to Vietnam in 1965, reaching Vung Tau on 9 November. Clearing Vung Tau later that day, she returned to New York by way of Penang, Malaysia; Rota, Spain; and Bremerhaven.

For the first six months of 1966, General Alexander M. Patch operated between New York and Bremerhaven. The Vietnam War once again compelled MSTS to switch some of its transports to the Pacific. General Alexander M. Patch and her sistership, USNS General William O. Darby (T-AP-127), embarked of the Army's 196th Light Infantry Brigade at Boston and departed on 15 July. Transiting the Panama Canal, the two transports reached Vung Tau, South Vietnam, on 13 August, ending the longest (12,358 nautical miles) point-to-point troop lift in the 17 years that MSTS had been in operation. Before the year was out, General Alexander M. Patch conducted two troop lifts of Republic of Korea troops from Pusan to South Vietnam.

Placed in reserve in New York's upper bay along with three of her sisterships by the summer of 1967, General Alexander M. Patch was transferred to the custody of the Maritime Administration on 26 May 1970 and placed in reserve in the United States National Defense Reserve Fleet in the James River, Virginia.

=== Fate ===
The General Alexander M. Patch was sold for scrapping, 4 June 2001, to Esco Marine Inc., Brownsville, Texas.
