= P2 transport =

American passenger ship design

The P2 transport was a United States Maritime Commission design for a passenger ship which could be readily converted into a troop transport. Three variants of the design were built, the P2-SE2-R1 (Admirals), P2-S2-R2 (Generals), and P2-SE2-R3 (Presidents).

== Admirals ==
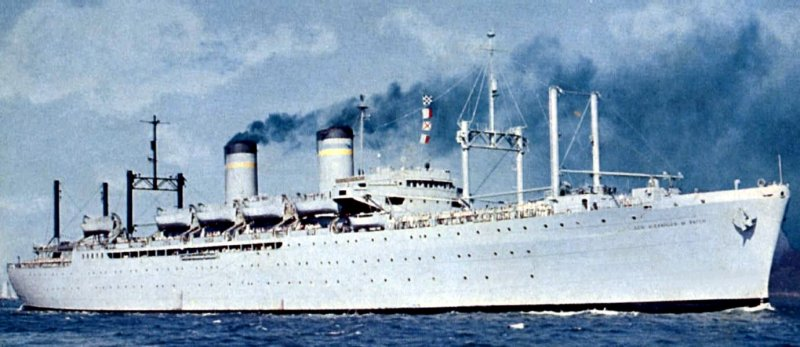
- USS Admiral R. E. Coontz (AP-122)

Class overview
- Name: Admiral-class
- Builders: Bethlehem Alameda Works
- Operators: United States Navy
- Built: 1942–45
- In commission: 1944–91
- Planned: 10
- Completed: 8

General characteristics
- Type: P2-SE2-R1
- Tonnage: 17,001 GT; 8,750 DWT
- Displacement: 12,650 long tons (12,853 t)
- Length: 609 ft (186 m) o/a
- Beam: 75 ft 6 in (23.01 m)
- Draft: 25 ft (7.6 m)
- Depth: 43 ft 6 in (13.26 m)
- Installed power: 19,000 hp (14,168 kW)
- Propulsion: Steam turbo-electric transmission; twin screw propellers
- Speed: 19 knots (35 km/h; 22 mph)
- Range: 12,000 nmi (22,000 km; 14,000 mi)
- Capacity: 100,000 ft^{3} (2,800 m^{3})
- Troops: 5,200

Ten P2-SE2-R1 ships were ordered by the Maritime Commission in World War II. The ships were laid down by the Bethlehem Shipbuilding Corporation in Alameda, California. The intended use of these ships after the war was trans-Pacific service. As ordered, the ships were named after U.S. Navy admirals. Only eight ships were completed as troop transports for the navy, with the last two ships canceled on 16 December 1944. Despite being canceled, the last two ships were completed after the war to the P2-SE2-R3 design as civilian ships.

In 1946 the ships were all decommissioned by the navy and transferred back to the Maritime Commission, and from there to the United States Army. The army operated them with civilian crews as part of the Army Transport Service and renamed them after generals of the United States Army. In 1950 the ships were transferred back to the navy, but not recommissioned. Instead they were assigned to the Military Sea Transportation Service, manned by a civil service crew, and keeping the names the army had given them.

United States Navy	Army Transport Service	Military Sea Transportation Service
USS Admiral W. S. Benson (AP-120)	USAT General Daniel I. Sultan	USNS General Daniel I. Sultan (T-AP-120)
USS Admiral W. L. Capps (AP-121)	USAT General Hugh J. Gaffey	USNS General Hugh J. Gaffey (T-AP-121)
USS Admiral R. E. Coontz (AP-122)	USAT General Alexander M. Patch	USNS General Alexander M. Patch (T-AP-122)
USS Admiral E. W. Eberle (AP-123)	USAT General Simon B. Buckner	USNS General Simon B. Buckner (T-AP-123)
USS Admiral C. F. Hughes (AP-124)	USAT General Edwin D. Patrick	USNS General Edwin D. Patrick (T-AP-124)
USS Admiral H. T. Mayo (AP-125)	USAT General Nelson M. Walker	USNS General Nelson M. Walker (T-AP-125)
USS Admiral Hugh Rodman (AP-126)	USAT General Maurice Rose	USNS General Maurice Rose (T-AP-126)
USS Admiral W. S. Sims (AP-127)	USAT General William O. Darby	USNS General William O. Darby (T-AP-127)
USS Admiral D. W. Taylor (AP-128)	Canceled 16 December 1944 and completed as civilian passenger liners.	
USS Admiral F. B. Upham (AP-129)	Canceled 16 December 1944 and completed as civilian passenger liners.	

== Generals ==
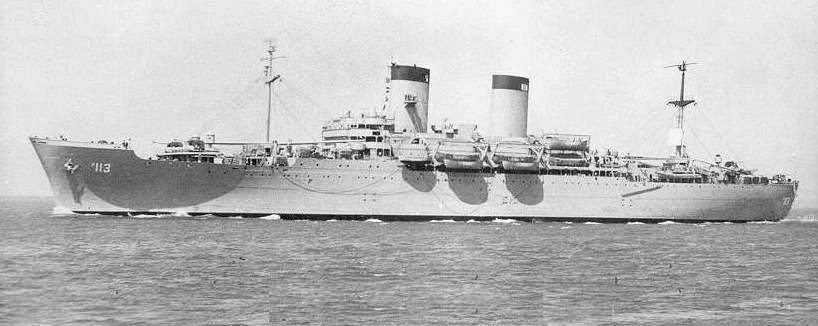
- USS General H. W. Butner (APA-113)

Class overview
- Name: General-class
- Builders: Federal Shipbuilding and Dry Dock Company, Kearny, New Jersey
- Operators: United States Navy
- Built: 1942–45
- In commission: 1943–70
- Completed: 11

General characteristics
- Type: P2-S2-R2
- Tonnage: 17,951 GT; 8,200 DWT
- Displacement: 11,450 long tons (11,634 t)
- Length: 623 ft (190 m) o/a
- Beam: 75 ft 6 in (23.01 m)
- Draft: 29 ft (8.8 m)
- Depth: 51 ft 6 in (15.70 m)
- Propulsion: C3-type geared turbines, 18,000 hp (13,423 kW), 2 shafts
- Speed: 19 knots (35 km/h; 22 mph)
- Range: 15,000 nmi (28,000 km; 17,000 mi)
- Capacity: 36,000–48,000 ft^{3} (1,000–1,400 m^{3})
- Troops: 4,500 to 4,800

Eleven P2-S2-R2 ships were ordered by the Maritime Commission in World War II. The ships were laid down by Federal Shipbuilding and Dry Dock Company of Kearny, New Jersey. The intended use of these ships after the War was for South American service. As ordered, the ships were all named after United States Army generals.

Unlike the Admirals, the Generals did not have a relatively uniform life after World War II. Three were transferred to the Army as the Admirals had been, of which one was disposed of by the Army and converted to a passenger liner before the Korean War. Five were retained by the Navy and were transferred to the Military Sea Transportation Service in October 1949 to be manned by civilian crews, and two others were transferred to American President Lines with the intent of being converted to a passenger liners, but ended up being chartered troop ships that in the Korean War were rejoined to military control as part of the Military Sea Transportation Service.

=== Ships in class ===
Ship name	Hull no.	Builder	Laid down	Launched	Commissioned	Decommissioned	Post USN - service names	Fate
General John Pope	AP-110	Federal Shipbuilding and Drydock Company, Kearny, New Jersey	14 July 1942	21 March 1943	5 August 1943	12 June 1946	USAT General John Pope; USNS General John Pope (T-AP-110)	Scrapped
General A. E. Anderson	AP-111	Federal Shipbuilding and Drydock Company, Kearny, New Jersey		2 May 1943	5 October 1943	10 November 1958	USNS General A. E. Anderson (T-AP-111)	Scrapped in Taiwan, July 1987
General W. A. Mann	AP-112	Federal Shipbuilding and Drydock Company, Kearny, New Jersey	1942	Unknown	13 October 1943	11 December 1965	USNS General W. A. Mann (T-AP-112)	
General H. W. Butner	AP-113	Federal Shipbuilding and Drydock Company, Kearny, New Jersey		19 September 1943	11 January 1944	28 January 1960	USNS General H. W. Butner (T-AP-113)	
General William Mitchell	AP-114	Federal Shipbuilding and Drydock Company, Kearny, New Jersey	Unknown	31 October 1943	19 January 1944	1 December 1966	USNS General William Mitchell (T-AP-114)	Scrapped at Taiwan, 1988
General George M. Randall	AP-115	Federal Shipbuilding and Drydock Company, Kearny, New Jersey	20 July 1943	30 January 1944	15 April 1944	2 June 1961	USNS General George M. Randall (T-AP-115)	Sold for scrap, 8 May 1975
General M. C. Meigs	AP-116	Federal Shipbuilding and Drydock Company, Kearny, New Jersey	22 September 1943	13 March 1944	3 June 1944	1 October 1958	SS General M. C. Meigs; USNS General M. C. Meigs (T-AP-116)	Broken up after being stranded on 9 January 1972
General W. H. Gordon	AP-117	Federal Shipbuilding and Drydock Company, Kearny, New Jersey	2 November 1943	7 May 1944	29 Jun 1944	April 1970	SS General W. H. Gordon; USNS General W. H. Gordon (T-AP-117)	Scrapped 1987, Taiwan
General W. P. Richardson	AP-118	Federal Shipbuilding and Drydock Company, Kearny, New Jersey	2 February 1944	6 August 1944	15 April 1944	14 February 1946	USAT General W. P. Richardson; SS La Guardia; SS Leilani; SS President Roosevelt; SS Atlantis; SS Emerald Seas; SS Sapphire Seas; SS Ocean Explorer I	Scrapped in India, 2005
General William Weigel	AP-119	Federal Shipbuilding and Drydock Company, Kearny, New Jersey	15 March 1944	3 September 1944	6 January 1945	10 May 1946	USAT General William Weigel; USNS General William Weigel (T-AP-119)	Scrapped 1987, Taiwan
General J. C. Breckinridge	AP-176	Federal Shipbuilding and Drydock Company, Kearny, New Jersey		18 March 1945	30 June 1945	1 December 1966	USAT General J. C. Breckinridge; USNS General J. C. Breckinridge (T-AP-176)	Scrapped 1988, Taiwan

== Presidents ==
As noted above, the last two Admirals were canceled in 1944 while under construction. They were completed to the P2-SE2-R3 design and operated by American President Lines as the SS President Cleveland (ex-USS Admiral D. W. Taylor) and the SS President Wilson (ex-USS Admiral F. B. Upham). The President Wilson was later renamed SS Oriental Empress when sold to C.Y. Tung in 1978.
