= SS President Wilson =

American passenger ship laid down in 1944

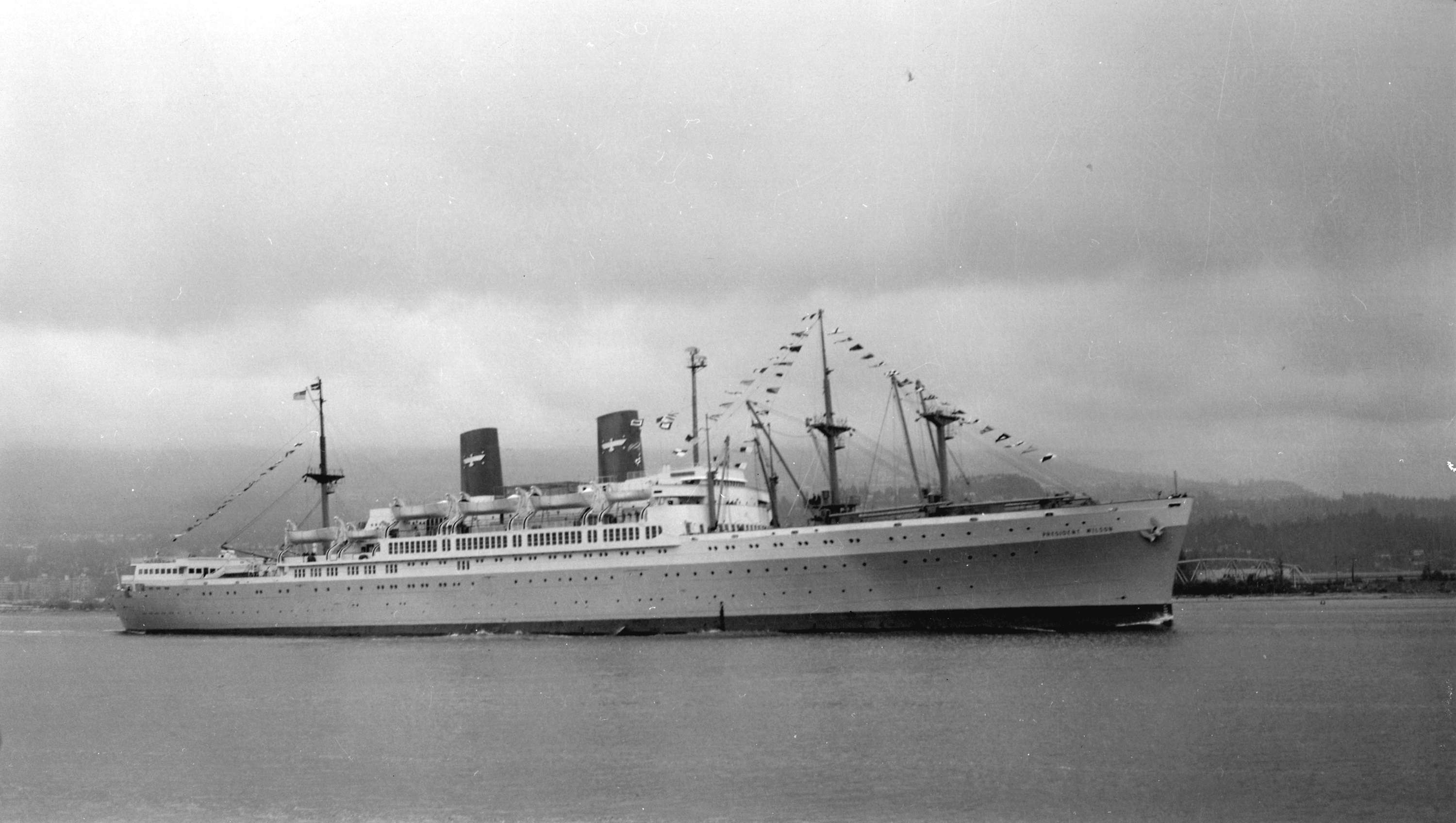

History

United States
- Name: SS President Wilson
- Namesake: Woodrow Wilson
- Operator: United States Maritime Commission (originally planned); American President Lines (1948-1970); Oceanic Cruise Development (1973-1984)
- Route: Trans-Pacific
- Builder: Bethlehem Shipbuilding Corporation, Alameda, California
- Yard number: 9510
- Laid down: November 27, 1944
- Launched: November 24, 1947
- Sponsored by: Mrs. E. Russell Lutz
- Completed: April 27, 1948
- In service: until 1961
- Renamed: Oriental Empress
- Identification: IMO number: 5284118; Official number: 255039
- Fate: Scrapped, 1984

General characteristics
- Tonnage: 15,359 GRT; 7,715 NRT; 10,431 DWT
- Displacement: 23,504 long tons (23,881 t)
- Length: 609 ft 6 in (185.78 m) o/a; 573 ft (175 m) p/p
- Beam: 75 ft 6 in (23.01 m)
- Draft: 30 ft 2 in (9.19 m)
- Installed power: 20,000 hp (14,914 kW)
- Propulsion: turbo-electric transmission; twin screw
- Speed: 20 knots (37 km/h; 23 mph)
- Capacity: 579 passengers (379 first class, 200 economy class); 193,984 cubic feet (5,493 m^{3}) cargo
- Notes: sister ship: SS President Cleveland

SS President Wilson was an American passenger ship originally ordered by the United States Maritime Commission during World War II, as one of the Admiral W. S. Benson-class Type P2-SE2-R1 transport ships, and intended to be named USS Admiral F.B. Upham (AP-129), but she was launched just after the war ended. in 1948, The ship was put into service for the American President Lines. The ship remained in service for the shipping company until 1973. She was sold to Oceanic Cruise Development before eventually, scrapped at Kaohsiung.

== Background ==
The President Wilson and her sister ship the SS President Cleveland were originally planned to be commissioned by the United States Maritime Commission in a series of eight troopships of the type P2-SE2-R1 (Admirals) class ships. The class was designed to be used as a passenger ship which could be readily converted into a troop transport ships during wartime service. During construction, President Wilson and President Cleveland were canceled, so the ships were later converted into passenger liners.

== History ==
The President Wilson was laid down on November 27, 1944, at the Bethlehem Steel shipyard in Alameda, California, but was cancelled on December 16, 1944. The ship was finally launched on November 24, 1947, completed and delivered to the Maritime Commission on April 27, 1948. Under the name SS President Wilson, she was bareboat chartered by the Maritime Commission to American President Lines (APL). During its service with APL, President Wilson operated on a Pacific Ocean route, traveling from San Francisco to Los Angeles, Hawaii, or the Far East before returning to San Francisco. By the late 1950s, passenger liners were being eclipsed by jet airplanes as the preferred mode of trans-oceanic travel, but APL redirected its marketing efforts to pleasure travelers and continued its liner service well past the retirement of many of President Wilson's contemporaries. The ship remained in service until 1960 without major incidents. It was then modernized in San Francisco. In 1962 President Wilson moved from San Francisco to Yokohama. In 1970 the ship was decommissioned and sold due to falling passenger numbers.

She was sold to Orient Overseas Line on April 27, 1973, and renamed Oriental Empress. On December 7, 1973, it departed Los Angeles but upon arriving in Hong Kong, oil was unable to be sourced due to the 1973 oil crisis and it was promptly withdrawn and its passengers flown home. It briefly returned to service before being withdrawn in September 1975. It remained laid up at anchor until taken to Kaohsiung, Taiwan for scrap in May 1984.
