= USS General A. E. Anderson =

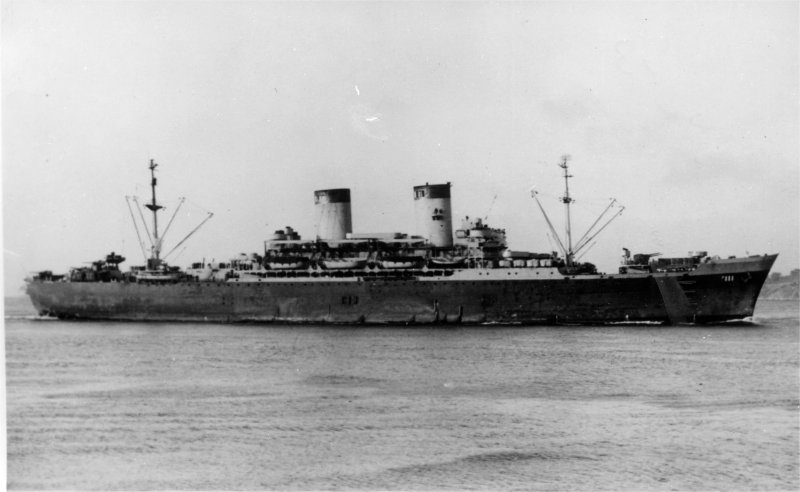
- USS General A. E. Anderson (AP-111) in 1944

History

United States
- Name: USS General A. E. Anderson
- Namesake: General Alexander E. Anderson, US Army
- Builder: Federal Shipbuilding & Drydock
- Launched: 2 May 1943
- Sponsored by: Mrs George C. Marshall
- Acquired: 25 August 1943
- Commissioned: 5 October 1943
- Decommissioned: 10 November 1958
- Stricken: 26 October 1990
- Identification: MC hull type P2-S2-R2, MC hull no. 689
- Honors and awards: One service star for Korean War service
- Fate: Scrapped in Taiwan, July 1987

General characteristics
- Class & type: General John Pope-class transport
- Displacement: 11,450 tons (lt); 20,175 tons full load
- Length: 622 feet 7 inches (189.76 m)
- Beam: 75 feet 6 inches (23.01 m)
- Draft: 25 feet 6 inches (7.77 m)
- Installed power: 17,000 shp
- Propulsion: turbo-electric transmission, twin screw
- Speed: 21 knots (39 km/h)
- Capacity: 5,142
- Complement: 465
- Armament: 4 x single 5"/38 caliber dual purpose guns, 4 x quad 1.1" guns, 20 x single 20mm guns

USS General A. E. Anderson (AP-111) was a troop transport that served with the United States Navy in World War II and the Korean War.

General A. E. Anderson was launched 2 May 1943 under a Maritime Commission contract by the Federal Shipbuilding and Drydock Company of Kearny, New Jersey; acquired by the Navy 25 August 1943; placed in partial commission the same day for transfer to Baltimore for conversion to a transport by the Maryland Drydock Company; and placed in full commission at Baltimore 5 October 1943.

== World War II ==
From 25 October 1943 to 21 March 1944 General A. E. Anderson made four round-trip transport voyages out of Norfolk, Virginia to Casablanca, French Morocco. Underway again 26 March 1944, she returned to North Africa and touched at Gourock, Scotland, before steaming to Bermuda, where British censors and their families embarked for passage to New York. The ship reached New York 7 May, and following a round-trip voyage to Belfast, Northern Ireland (carrying the Nebraska "All Hell Can't Stop Us" 134th Infantry Regiment along with other elements of the 35th Division, including the Band, and accompanied by the cruiser USS Marblehead. Troops were disembarked at Avonmouth, Port of Bristol") she stood out of Norfolk 29 June for Bombay, where her troops debarked 7 August. General A. E. Anderson returned to San Pedro, Los Angeles, 11 September 1944, and made another long round-trip voyage thence to Bombay via Australia, returning 9 December.

Until the summer of 1945 the busy ship made two round-trip voyages from San Francisco to Hollandia and Leyte, sailing from Leyte to reach Norfolk 22 July 1945. The most famous voyage was the return of prisoners of war rescued by the Raid at Cabanatuan. The General A. E. Anderson departed Hollandia, New Guinea carrying 489 POWs. It traveled a longer route due to threats from the Japanese. It arrived in San Francisco on 8 March 1945, amid great fanfare and a band playing "Don't Fence Me In". Film footage of this voyage can be seen in the ending credits of the movie, "The Great Raid".

=== After hostilities ===
General A. E. Anderson then commenced troop rotation and Magic Carpet duties. From 8 August 1945 to 15 April 1946 she made eight transatlantic voyages to France (Marseille, Le Havre), England (Southampton), and India (Karachi). Of these active voyages, six were from New York, and one each from Norfolk and Boston.

The ship stood out of Norfolk 9 July 1946 for San Francisco, arriving 24 July, and commenced a pattern of troop carrying and supply runs from West Coast ports to China, Japan, the Philippines, and Guam.

== Korean War ==
Assigned to MSTS in October 1949, she continued these duties until war flared again in the Far East when Communist troops crossed the 38th Parallel to invade the Republic of Korea. The Navy moved quickly to bring American force into action to halt and push back the North Koreans. General A. E. Anderson embarked the men and equipment of Marine Air Group 33 at Terminal Island, California, and headed for Japan. She reached Kobe 31 July 1950 with these Marine fliers who helped save the day for embattled South Korean and American ground forces as they struggled to maintain a foothold at the southern tip of the beleaguered Korean Peninsula.

Returning to San Francisco in August, she embarked 1,800 men of the 11th Airborne Division's 187th Airborne Regimental Combat Team and brought them to Moji, Japan, on 20 September 1950.

Throughout the remainder of the Korean War General A. E. Anderson followed her familiar pattern of transport runs from West Coast ports to Japan and Korea as she supported United Nations forces in Korea.

== Decommission ==
Thereafter she continued identical peacetime operations until she decommissioned at Oakland, California, 10 November 1958. After being returned to the Maritime Administration she entered the National Defense Reserve Fleet at Suisun Bay, California. She was sold for scrap on 14 November 1986 for the sum of $1,177,200 and scrapped in Taiwan in July 1987.

== Awards ==
General A. E. Anderson received one service star for Korean War service.
