= Hugh Rodman =

United States Navy admiral

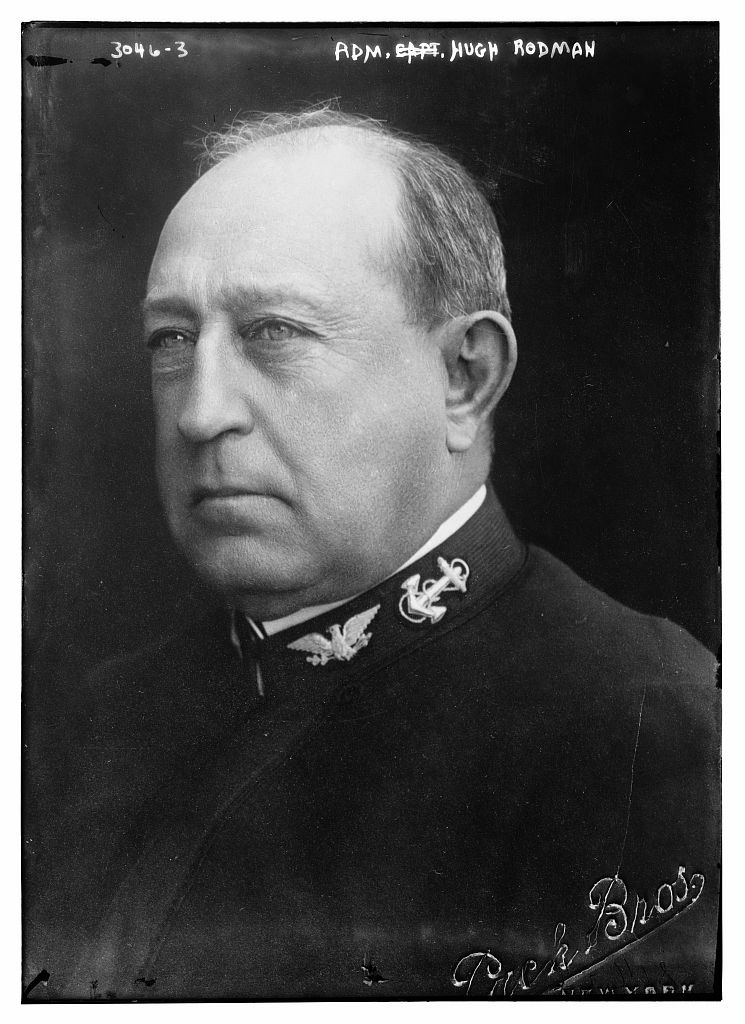
- Rodman in 1915
- Born: January 6, 1859; Frankfort, Kentucky, U.S.
- Died: June 7, 1940 (aged 81); Bethesda, Maryland, U.S.
- Military career
- Allegiance: United States of America
- Branch: United States Navy
- Service years: 1880–1923
- Rank: Admiral
- Commands: U.S. Pacific Fleet
- Conflicts: Spanish–American War; World War I
- Awards: Navy Distinguished Service Medal

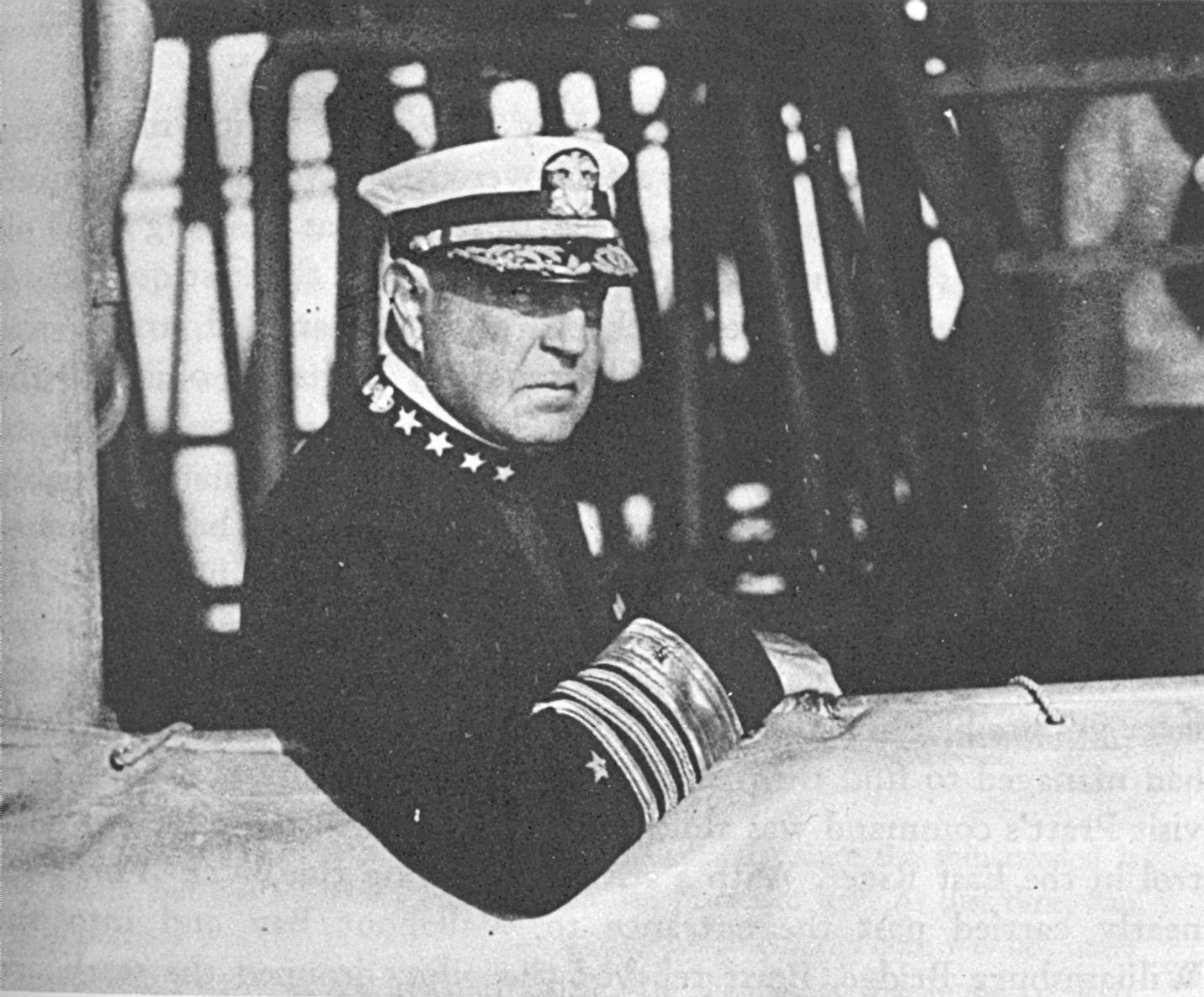
Hugh Rodman

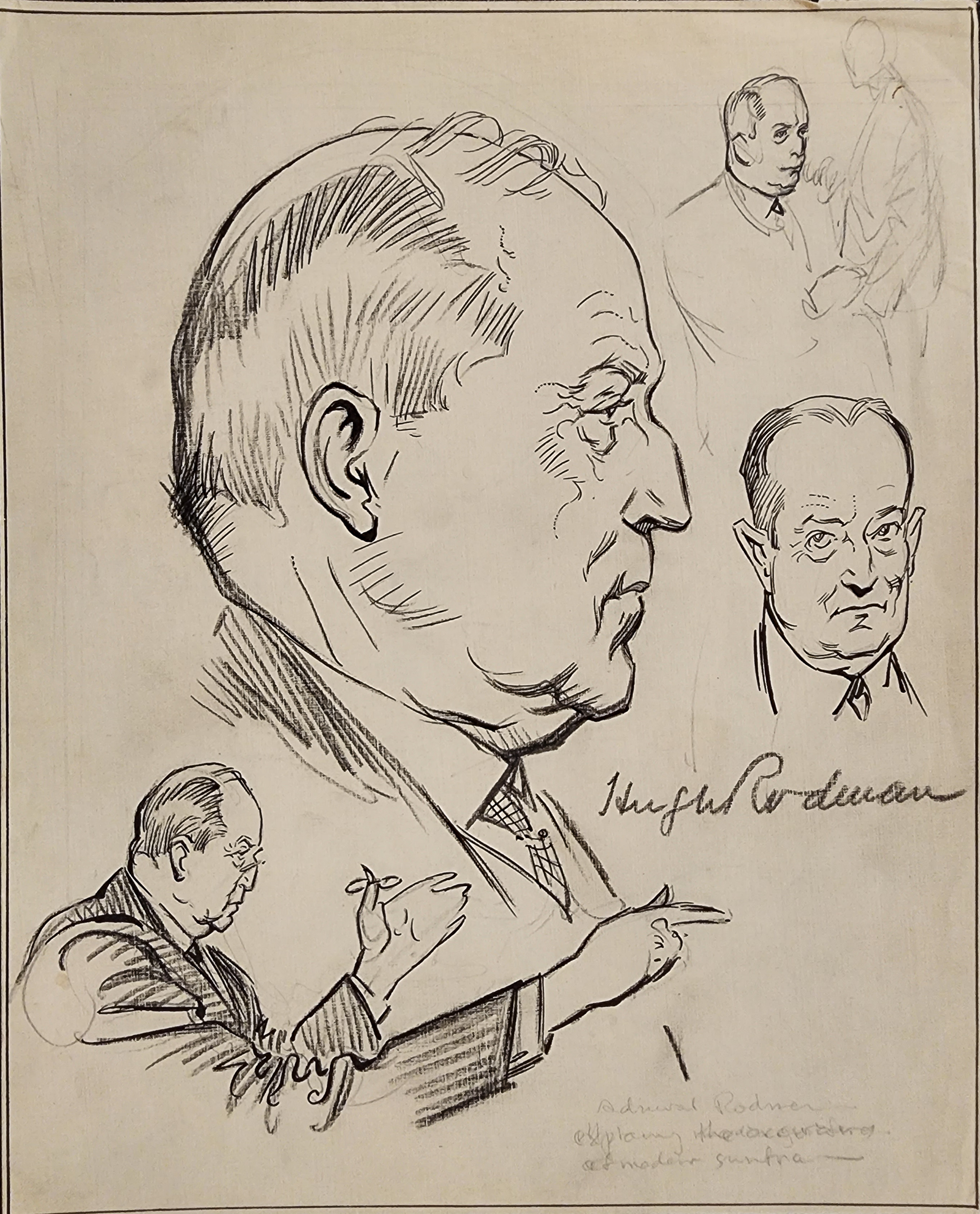
Signed drawing by Manuel Rosenberg 1924

Admiral Hugh Rodman KCB (6 January 1859 – 7 June 1940) was an officer in the United States Navy who served during the Spanish–American War and World War I, later serving as the Commander-in-Chief, U.S. Pacific Fleet from 1919 to 1921.

== Biography ==
Born at Frankfort, Kentucky, Rodman graduated from the Naval Academy in 1880. Duty in USS Yantic, Wachusett, Hartford, and Essex, and tours at the Hydrographic Office and at the United States Naval Observatory were followed in 1891 by four years of survey duty along the coasts of Alaska and British Columbia.

During the Spanish–American War, he served in USS Raleigh and was commended for his outstanding conduct in the Battle of Manila Bay. In 1899, he participated in scientific explorations in the Pacific under the direction of Alexander Agassiz. Then, in 1900, he returned to Alaska for work investigating its fisheries. From 1901 to 1904 he commanded USS Iroquois in Hawaiian waters. Next on the Asiatic Station, he served in USS New Orleans, Cincinnati, Wisconsin and, in 1905, commanded the gunboat Elcano on the Yangtze River Patrol.

From 1907 to 1909, he attended the Naval War College and served as Lighthouse Inspector, 6th Naval District. In 1909 he returned to the Far East to serve in turn as captain of the yard, Cavite, Philippine Islands, and as commanding officer of USS Cleveland. Captain of the yard, Mare Island Navy Yard, in 1911, he assumed command of USS Connecticut, flagship, Atlantic Fleet, in 1912, and of USS Delaware in 1913. Duty as Marine Superintendent of the Panama Canal followed in 1914, and in 1915 he commanded USS New York. During 1916 he served on the General Board.

Promoted to the rank of rear admiral in 1917, Rodman served as commander of Battleship Division 9, Atlantic Fleet, in his flagship, New York. Ordered to European waters late in the year, his division joined the British Grand Fleet at Scapa Flow and became the 6th Battle Squadron, British Grand Fleet, under Admiral Sir David Beatty. For the remainder of World War I, Admiral Rodman commanded his division in operations in the North Sea. For this service, he was invested as a Knight Commander of the Order of the Bath by King George V and was awarded the Navy Distinguished Service Medal.

Returning to the United States after the Armistice, he served with the Atlantic Fleet until July 1919 when he became Commander-in-Chief, Pacific Fleet. Detached in 1921, he served as Commandant, 5th Naval District, from 1921 to 1922, interrupting that duty once for a mission to Peru as Minister Plenipotentiary and Envoy Extraordinary. During 1922–23, he was senior member of a board to formulate administrative policy for all shore stations and on reaching retirement age, 64, was transferred to the retired list.

After his retirement, he continued to serve the United States and the navy on various missions which included, in the summer of 1923, accompanying President Warren G. Harding on his ill-fated inspection of Alaska. In 1937, he represented the U.S. Navy at King George VI's coronation ceremonies in London.

Admiral Rodman died at Bethesda, Maryland and is buried at Arlington National Cemetery.

== Awards and honors ==
=== United States ===
- Navy Distinguished Service Medal
- Dewey Medal
- Spanish Campaign Medal
- Philippine Campaign Medal
- World War I Victory Medal

=== Foreign ===
- Grand Cordon in the Order of Leopold (Belgium)
- Knight Commander of the Order of the Bath (United Kingdom)

== Namesakes ==
The destroyer USS Rodman (DD-456), the transport USS Admiral Hugh Rodman (AP-126), and U.S Navy Station Rodman in the Panama Canal Zone were named for him.

== See also ==
- Admiral William Sims Commander of U.S. Naval Forces in Europe

Military offices
Preceded by William B. Caperton	Commander in Chief, United States Pacific Fleet; July, 1919–June 30, 1921	Succeeded by Edward W. Eberle
