= USS Admiral E. W. Eberle =

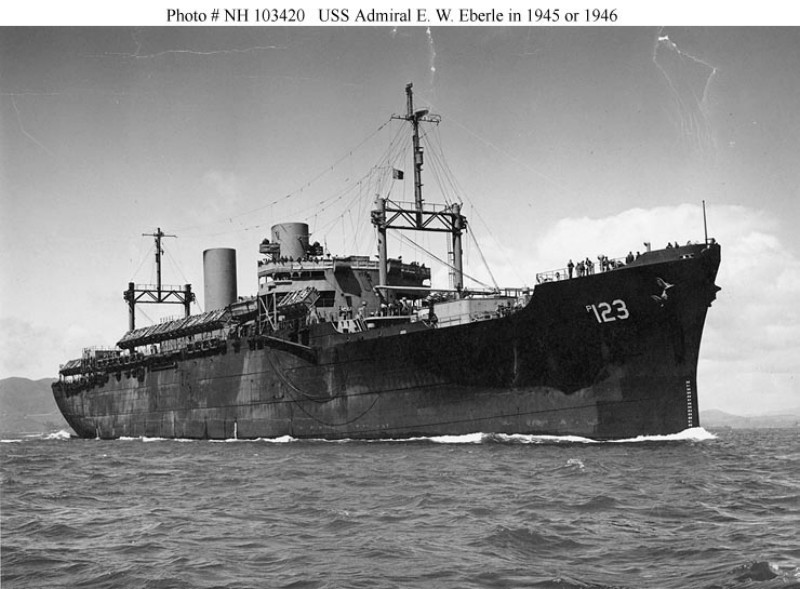

History

United States
- Name: USS Admiral E. W. Eberle (AP-123)
- Namesake: Admiral Edward Walter Eberle, US Navy
- Builder: Bethlehem-Alameda Shipyard Inc., Alameda, California
- Laid down: 15 February 1943
- Launched: 4 June 1944
- Sponsored by: Mrs. Earl Warren
- Renamed: USAT Admiral E. W. Eberle, circa 1946
- Renamed: USAT General Simon B. Buckner, circa 1946
- Namesake: General Simon Bolivar Buckner, Jr., US Army
- Renamed: USNS General Simon B. Buckner (T-AP-123), 1 March 1950
- Out of service: 1967
- Identification: IMO number: 8424525
- Fate: dismantled in May 1999 at International Shipbreaking Co., Brownsville, Texas

General characteristics
- Class & type: Admiral W. S. Benson-class transport
- Displacement: 9,676 tons dockside, 20,120 tons fully laden
- Length: 608 feet 11 inches (185.60 m)
- Beam: 75 feet 6 inches (23.01 m)
- Draft: 26 feet 6 inches (8.08 m)
- Installed power: 19,000 shp
- Propulsion: turbo-electric transmission, twin screw
- Speed: 19 knots (35 km/h)
- Capacity: 100,000 cubic feet (2,800 m^{3}) of cargo
- Troops: 5,200
- Complement: officers – 32; enlisted – 324
- Armament: 4 × 5-inch/38-caliber gun mounts; 8 × twin Bofors 40 mm gun mounts; 14 × twin Oerlikon 20 mm cannon gun mounts

USS Admiral E. W. Eberle (AP-123) was laid down on 15 February 1943 under a Maritime Commission contract (MC hull 681) by the Bethlehem Shipbuilding Corporation, Alameda, California; launched on 14 June 1944; sponsored by Mrs. Earl Warren, the wife of the Governor of California who later became Chief Justice of the United States Supreme Court; and acquired by the Navy and commissioned on 24 January 1945.

The transport was operated by the Naval Transportation Service and crewed largely by Coast Guard personnel. On 6 March, she departed San Francisco with troops and supplies bound for New Guinea. She made stops at Finschhafen and Hollandia before dropping anchor at Manus Island on 25 March. While there, a Navy plane crashed into the starboard side of the ship. It was a Sunday morning and the Navy aircraft with only the pilot on board was doing aerobatics for the troop. The aircraft left only to return with another person on board. While doing a loop the pilot realized he was not going to clear the ship so rather than hit the ship at the main deck level where the troops had gathered to watch he nosed the aircraft down and hit the ship in the side. Both occupants of the plane were killed, and casualties on board Admiral E. W. Eberle numbered one dead and five wounded.

On 26 March, the ship sailed in convoy for the Philippines. After loading troops at Leyte, Admiral E. W. Eberle proceeded to Manila. There, she embarked over 2,000 civilians for transportation to the United States. These passengers were mainly American citizens who had been interned in the Philippines since Japanese forces captured the islands in the spring of 1942. Admiral E. W. Eberle returned to Leyte on 13 April to pick up Army personnel; then sailed, via Ulithi, for the west coast of the United States and reached San Pedro, California, on 2 May.

The ship's next voyage took her across the Atlantic to Italy. Arriving at Naples on 4 June, she embarked Army personnel and baggage for transportation to Trinidad. The transport reached Trinidad on 18 June and soon reversed her course, bound for France. At Le Havre, Admiral E. W. Eberle embarked over 4,000 homeward-bound troops whom she put ashore upon her arrival at Norfolk on 6 July.

Admiral E. W. Eberle stood out to sea again on 14 July for another voyage to France. She touched at Marseille and took on board troops destined for the Philippines. 25 July 1945 She departed Arles, France with troops. Admiral E. W. Eberle steamed via the Panama Canal and Ulithi, arrived at Luzon on 29 August 1945, debarked part of her passengers, and moved on to Manila arriving 7 September 1945.

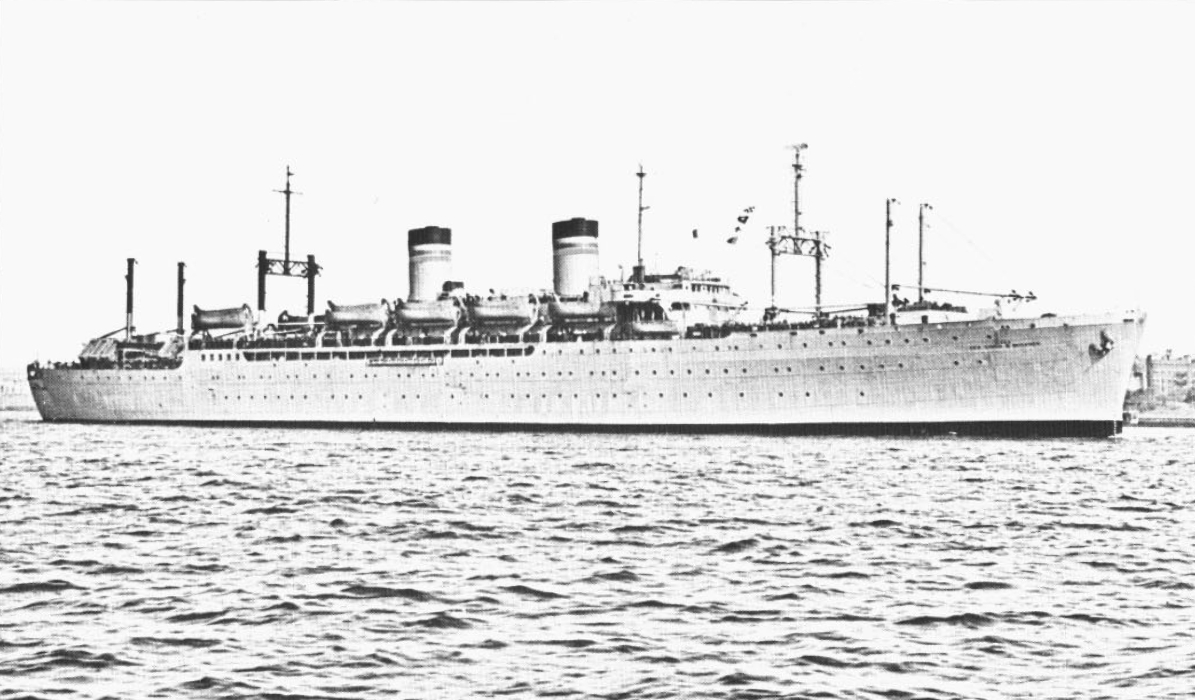
USNS General Simon B. Buckner (T-AP-123).

The transport returned to the United States in September and put into Seattle, WA, for upkeep. Between October 1945 and March 1946, Admiral E. W. Eberle made three voyages to Japan and Korea.

Admiral E. W. Eberle was decommissioned on 8 May 1946 and returned to the Maritime Commission for transfer to the army. Her name was struck from the Navy list in June 1946. The army acquired the transport that same month and subsequently renamed her General Simon B. Buckner.

The ship was once again transferred to the navy on 1 March 1950 and assigned to the Military Sea Transportation Service. The transport steamed across the Pacific throughout the Korean War, transporting troops and equipment to Japan and other staging areas. General Simon B. Buckner continued operations in the Pacific until 15 February 1955, when she departed San Francisco, bound for New York City.

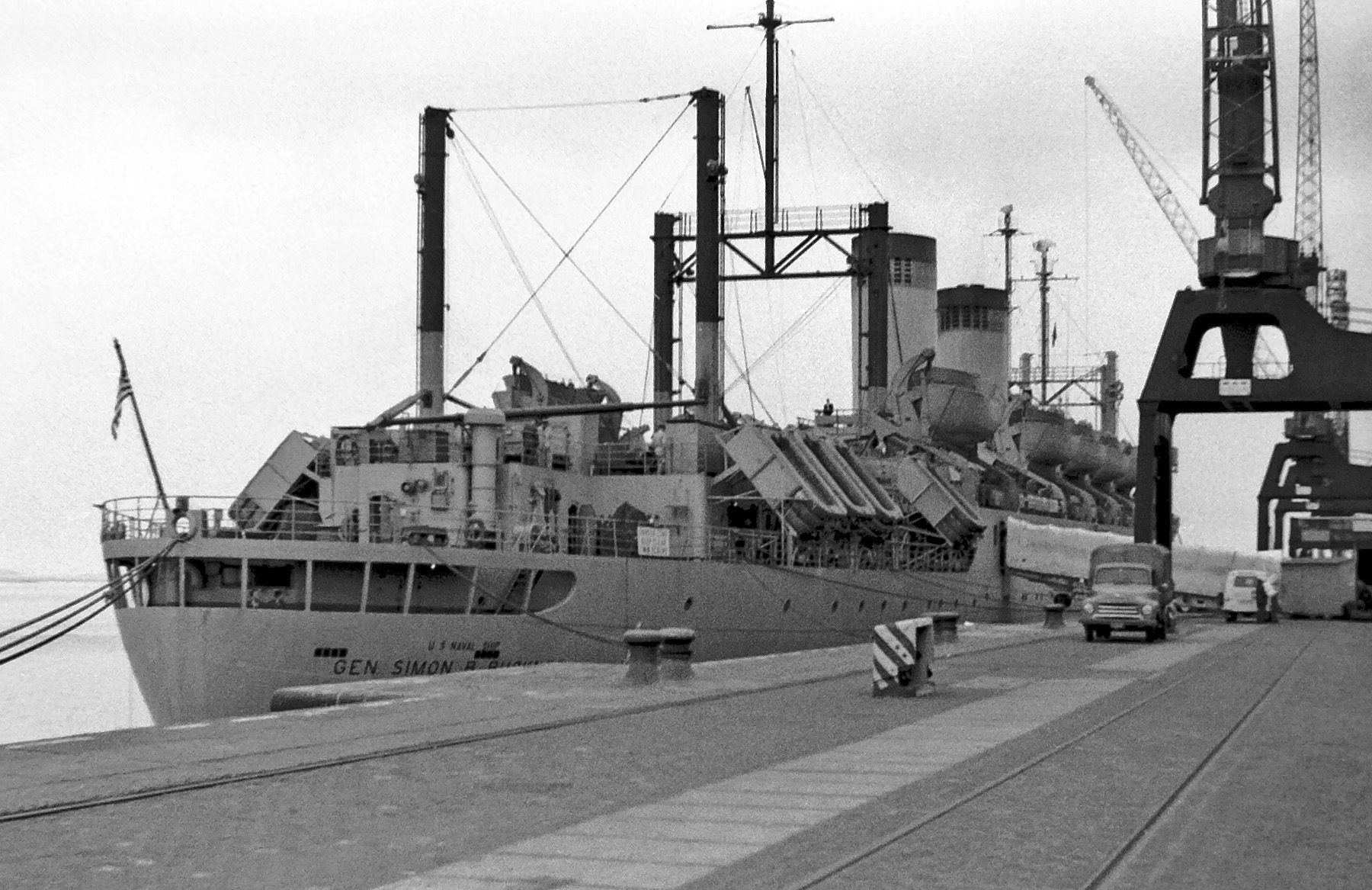
USNS General Simon B. Buckner 1965 in Bremerhaven

Upon arrival two weeks later, she was assigned to the New York-Bremerhaven runs. In the next 10 years General Simon B. Buckner made over 130 Atlantic voyages from New York to Bremerhaven, Southampton, and the Mediterranean.

Departing New York on 11 August 1965, she returned to the west coast, arriving at Long Beach on the 27th to assist in the movement of troops and equipment to southeast Asia. After two cruises to Vietnam, the veteran transport resumed operation in the Atlantic, arriving at New York on 3 December.

In the next eight months, she steamed across the Atlantic 10 times, making stops at Bremerhaven and Southampton. Returning to the west coast in August 1966, General Simon B. Buckner was once again pressed into service to carry war material to Vietnam. She departed San Francisco on 8 September and reached Da Nang 20 days later. Following her return to San Francisco on 16 October, she continued to support American operations in southeast Asia until President Richard Nixon's Vietnamization program decreased the Navy's need for transports. She was returned to the Maritime Administration on 24 March 1970.
