= USAT McClellan =

United States Army transport ship

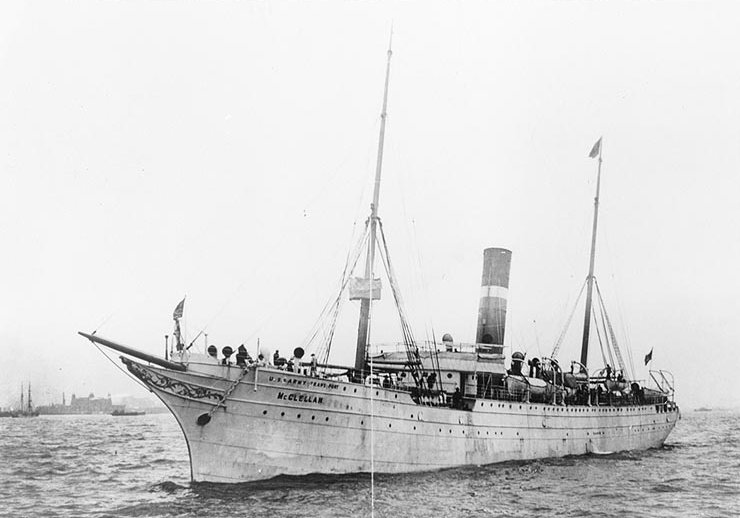
- USAT McClellan c. 1917 or earlier

History
- Name: USAT McClellan
- Owner: William Milburn & Co (1885–98); United States Army (1898–1918); United States Shipping Board (1918–20); Lloyd Royal Belge SA (1920–22)
- Operator: Anglo-Australasian Steam Navigation Co (1885–98); United States Army (1898–1918); United States Shipping Board (1918–20); Lloyd Royal Belge SA (1920–22)
- Builder: Andrew Leslie & Co. (England)
- Launched: 27 August 1885
- Christened: Port Victor
- Completed: 1885
- In service: Merchant: 1885–1898; U.S. Army: 1898–1919; Merchant: 1919–1920
- Renamed: 1898: USAT McClellan; 1919: Hastier
- Fate: Sold for scrap, 1922

General characteristics
- Type: Passenger-cargo steamship
- Tonnage: 2,793 tons, 1,827 grt
- Length: 336 ft (102 m)
- Beam: 38 ft (12 m)
- Draught: 27 ft (8.2 m)
- Installed power: 400 hp triple expansion steam engines
- Propulsion: Screw propeller
- Sail plan: Barque-rigged

USAT McClellan was a United States Army transport ship that saw service during the Spanish–American War and World War I. She also participated in the occupation of Veracruz in 1914.

McClellan was originally SS Port Victor, a steel-hulled passenger-cargo screw steamer, built for Anglo-Australian service in the 1880s. Eventually converted into an early example of a refrigerated ship, Port Victor continued in Australian service until shortly before her sale in 1898 to the United States government for use as a transport during the Spanish–American War.

After the war, she was renamed USAT McClellan and employed as a U.S. Army transport for more than twenty years, supplying the garrisons in Cuba, Puerto Rico and the Philippines. Sold in 1919, she briefly returned to mercantile service under the name SS Hastier, until being damaged by a fire in 1920 and subsequently scrapped.

== Construction and design ==
Port Victor was built by Andrew Leslie & Co. at Newcastle-on-Tyne in 1885 for W. Milburn & Co., a company which operated a fleet of ships between Britain and Australia under a subsidiary known as the Anglo-Australian Steam Navigation Company. Port Victor was the Milburn Line's first steel-hulled ship, as well as being the first of the company's ships to have a clipper bow and be fitted with a triple expansion engine. Like most of the Anglo-Australian Line's ships, Port Victor was named after an Australian port, in this case that of Port Victor, South Australia (now known as Victor Harbor).

Port Victor was a passenger-cargo ship of 2,793 tons (1,828 tons gross). The ship had two decks, six watertight bulkheads, two masts, (Note: See photo.) barque-rigged, and a single funnel. Her powerplant was a 400 IHP, three-cylinder triple expansion steam engine with cylinders of 27, 42 and 70 inches by 48-inch stroke. With her fine, "yacht-like" proportions, Port Victor was considered to be "out of the ordinary run" of tramp steamers and "one of the handsomest" of the Milburn fleet. In addition to her cargoes, she could carry both cabin-class and steerage passengers.

== Service history ==
=== Australian service ===
Port Victor entered service in 1885. For the next dozen years, she would operate from her homeport of London to a host of Australian ports, including those of Melbourne, Sydney, Hobart and Darwin, as well as other Pacific and Far Eastern destinations such as New Zealand, Singapore, Hong Kong and Batavia.

Port Victor's initial service period proved eventful. Her first recorded voyage to Australia took place in December 1885, carrying eight cabin- and six steerage-class passengers in addition to her cargoes. Upon arrival in Australia, the ship immediately became embroiled in controversy when The Argus newspaper in Melbourne accused a company responsible for providing some of the ship's cargoes of falsely describing a consignment of 13 tons of bisulphate of carbon, "a chemical of a most volatile and combustible nature", as sheep dip. The firm in question quickly sued the paper for libel, and in August 1887, won damages of £250 in a split jury decision. The Argus however maintained that it had been correct to publish the story, citing public safety and noting that public pressure had since forced the shipping firm in question to reduce the amount of the chemical shipped in individual vessels.

Shortly before the resolution of this court case, in July 1887, Port Victor again became the source of "considerable excitement" when one of the ship's passengers arriving in Sydney from Hong Kong turned out to have smallpox. The passenger was quickly quarantined while the Sydney Board of Health took steps to have Hong Kong declared an "infected port".

In June of the following year, Port Victor was again in the news, this time as the result of a rough passage from London to Sydney. On 28 May, the ship had run into a gale which tore away the topsails, while heavy seas smashed the port side of the upper bridge, wrecked the forward house on the bridge, and damaged one of the lifeboats. Sheep pens, hen coops, dog kennels and livestock on the ship's deck were swept overboard, and the passenger quarters, including the saloons and cabins, were flooded. A little over a year later, on 8 July 1889, the ship suffered a second accident when she ran aground on a reef off Restoration Island, northwest of Brisbane, on a coal-carrying voyage from Newcastle, NSW to Batavia. The ship was refloated without damage a few days later after the removal of about 200 tons of cargo.

In October 1889, Port Victor sailed from London bound for Sydney with relieving crews for the Royal Navy ships HMS Royalist and HMS Egoria, arriving at her destination after a rough passage in mid-December. Egoria's discharged crew, which had been engaged in a survey mission for a cable-laying project to Vancouver, New Zealand, exchanged places with the relieving crew aboard Port Victor for the return voyage to Britain. Port Victor was back in Melbourne by May 1890, with a cargo of ammunition and railway rolling stock for the government, in addition to four draught horses presumably brought out for breeding purposes.

==== Refrigeration ship ====
The exact date on which Port Victor was converted into a refrigeration ship is not known, but it is known that ships of the Anglo-Australian Line, including Port Victor, began to transport apples and pears from Tasmania to Britain in about 1891, suggesting the conversion took place around this time. As marine refrigeration was still in its infancy, this particular venture seems to have been something of a hit-and-miss affair, with some fruit shipments arriving in Britain in good condition and others not.

In 1894, Port Victor sailed from London bound for Western Australia with a passenger complement of fifty female emigrants, handpicked by the United British Women's Immigration Association, for placement in the colony as female servants, for whom there was much demand. The girls were said to be "much pleased" with the accommodations arranged for them aboard ship.

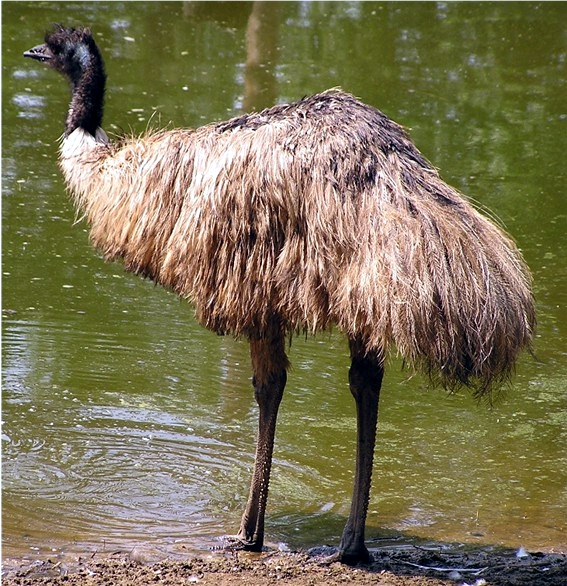
Australian exports to London aboard Port Victor included a shipment of emus

A couple of voyages to London reported on in 1895 give an idea of the kind of exports produced in Australia at the time. In a June 1895 voyage, Port Victor sailed with 73 "specially selected bullocks", although 17 died before reaching their destination. Upon arrival in Britain, it was decided to slaughter the animals as the ship had made a port of call at Malta during its voyage. The carcasses yielded an average of 122 stone each (976 lb), which was sold wholesale at between 3s. 2d. and 3s. 4d. per stone. The cargo on this trip also included a number of emus, although the reason for their export is not disclosed. In November, Port Victor sailed from Melbourne for London with a cargo of 2,100 bales of wool, and 440 cases of rabbits from the Hamilton Preserving Factory.

Port Victor's last known voyage between Britain and Australia took place in 1896. In February 1897, after twelve years of Pacific service, the refrigerated vessel was shifted to the Caribbean, where she appears to have carried the first-ever cargo of Jamaican fruit direct to London, in a move her owners hoped would "create a revolution in the foreign fruit trade". Shortly afterward however, on 7 July 1898, Port Victor and another ship of the Anglo-Australian Line, Port Chalmers, were purchased for £31,500 and £70,000 respectively by the United States government, for use as transports following the outbreak in April of the Spanish–American War.

=== U.S. Army transport ===
A few days after the purchase by the U.S. government of Port Victor, an "infernal machine"—a bomb consisting of 30 lbs of dynamite—was reportedly discovered and disarmed on board the vessel. Port Victor was thereafter quickly put into operation, transporting Red Cross ambulances and mules to Cuba; unfortunately, the shipment came too late to assist the wounded after the battles for Santiago. In August, the ship also transported 150 tons of ice to Santiago for use in the hospitals.

After the war, Port Victor was retained by the U.S. Army and converted into a transport by the removal of her refrigeration equipment. Renamed USAT McClellan, the ship would spend the next two decades in Army service.

==== Cuban and Puerto Rican service ====
From the end of the Spanish–American War in August 1898 through to May 1901, McClellan and several other Army transports were engaged in the supply and rotation of U.S. occupation troops in the newly conquered territories of Cuba and Puerto Rico. McClellan maintained a regular monthly service to the islands at a cost of about $13,000 per voyage, transferring troops, government officials, civilians and supplies to and from the outposts. On several occasions, the ship was also used to return the remains of U.S. soldiers and others who had died during the occupation from illness and other causes. 76 bodies were returned in this manner in January 1900, followed by 101 in March of the same year and another 39 in February 1901. Most of the deceased were apparently victims of yellow fever.

In August 1899, McClellan became the subject of a test case after a dispute at Gibara, Cuba, between two of the ship's officers, the quartermaster and the sailing master, the latter of whom resigned after having his advice to put to sea before the onset of a hurricane overruled by the former. The sailing master was later dismissed from government service over the episode, thus settling the "vexed question" of which officer exercised ultimate authority on an Army transport.

Not long after McClellan's departure from Gibara, a hurricane devastated Puerto Rico, and McClellan spent the next two months carrying relief supplies to the island, provided by both the government and private donors. On August 24, for example, the ship sailed with 1,600 tons of supplies including a wide variety of foodstuffs, clothing, medicines such as quinine and building materials. Another voyage in mid-September carried 352,800 pounds of rice and a substantial quantity of beans, in addition to more medicine.

By the end of the month, McClellan was back in New York to take part in the grand naval parade on 29 September, arranged in celebration of Admiral George Dewey's return to the United States following his victory over Spanish forces in the Philippines the previous year. The parade, then the biggest in the city's history, was more than seven miles long and consisted of hundreds of ships and boats of all types, including both naval and private vessels. McClellan was one of three vessels in the parade representing the Army Transport Service (A.T.S.). More than a million people watched from the shore, after which a land parade of five to six hours duration—received by Dewey himself—took place through the streets of New York.

==== Philippines and Far Eastern station ====
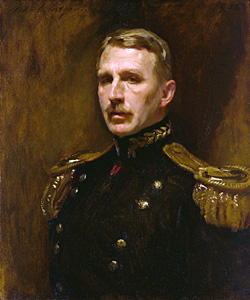
General Leonard Wood departed the Philippines aboard McClellan in 1908.

In June 1901, McClellan's service to Cuba and Puerto Rico was terminated after corporate lobbyists succeeded in having the work transferred to private contractors. McClellan and the other transports formerly engaged in this service were instead switched to supplying the U.S. garrison established in the new American protectorate of the Philippines, seized from the Spanish during the recent Spanish–American War. For McClellan's new role, the Army considered reinstalling the ship with refrigeration equipment, but it is not known if this modification was carried out. McClellan would spend the next several years in service to the Philippines, carrying troops, supplies, officials and civilians between New York and Manila.

Although a small transport, McClellan, with her two stateroom-fitted decks and extra bathrooms, had better accommodations than some of the other small transports, as a result of which she not infrequently carried officers and their families along with other dignitaries. One of her first such voyages to Manila occurred in July 1901 when she carried a party of U.S. Congressmen on a fact-finding mission. In February of the following year, McClellan carried 200 teachers to the same destination, including 80 females. In November of the same year, the Army's Engineering Dept. proposed the conversion of McClellan into a dredge to assist with work in the Ambrose Channel in New York Harbor, which had fallen well behind schedule, but this proposal was successfully resisted by the Quartermasters' Dept., and McClellan continued in service as a transport.

On 7 December 1905 the steamer Rosalie, tied up along side, caught fire at dock at the foot of Fifty-sixth street, Brooklyn, New York. McClellan had 6 streams of water going unto the ship within 5 minutes. The water caused Rosalie to fill and sink. In February 1906, McClellan was transferred to the Philippines station, and would not return to the United States for more than two years. Her precise duties during this period are not recorded but she is known to have made voyages to Far Eastern destinations, in one instance being slated to return to his post the Governor of the Philippines, William Howard Taft, from a mission to China. McClellan would finally return to the United States after a two-year absence in April 1908, carrying a number of officers and their families including General Leonard Wood.

==== Return to Latin American service ====
After her return from the Philippines, McClellan returned to Latin American service. In 1909, she participated in the withdrawal of occupation troops and officials from Cuba following the termination of Charles E. Magoon's governorship and the restoration of the island's independence under José Miguel Gómez. In 1913, McClellan participated in a military buildup of 3,000 troops at Cuba in response to a war scare with Mexico.

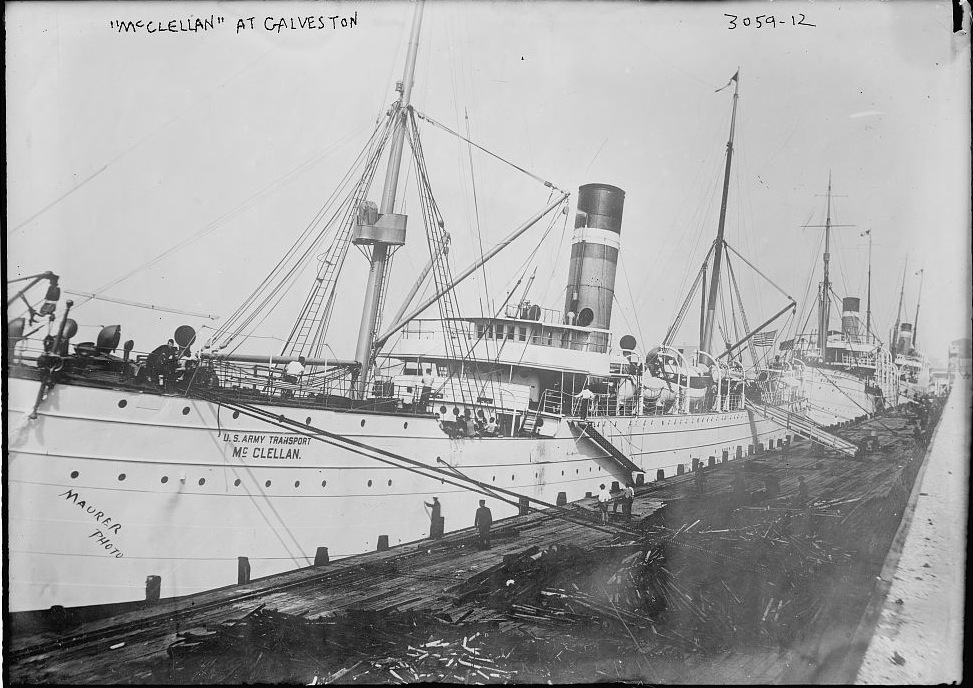
U.S. Army Transport McClellan at Galveston 1914

In April 1914, McClellan took part in the United States occupation of Veracruz, Mexico, following the Tampico Affair earlier that month. McClellan sailed from Galveston, Texas with a destroyer escort and three other transports carrying a total of 4,000 troops, arriving off Veracruz on the 27th. After a brief battle, U.S. forces established control of the port and remained in occupation for six months. The incident precipitated a considerable worsening of relations between the two countries, and is said to have brought them to the brink of all-out war.

==== Conversion to refrigerated cargo ====
McClellan was chosen by the Quartermaster Corps for conversion to refrigerated cargo capability when directed to choose one of its ships to supply frozen beef and other products to Army forces stationed in the Gulf of Mexico. The conversion was carried out by the Corps at New Orleans in early summer 1914. Little trace of the old refrigerated spaces and equipment remained but a refrigerated room on the lower deck and an old ice making machine remained. The ice machine was beyond repair and when insulation was removed from the old refrigerated room the deck plating underneath was found to be rusted out, requiring complete replacement. The conversion was done in a very short time as beef was already scheduled for delivery.

After conversion the number 1, 2, 3, and 4 'tween decks space and holds were equipped for refrigerated cargo with a separate meat and ice box and another for ship's stores with a gross refrigerated space of 105,934 cubic feet (2,999.7 m^{3}). A thirty-ton Mayer Ice Machine Company refrigeration unit was installed along with two 10 kilowatt generators for lighting at New Orleans. The ship was ordered to New York on the day the work was completed and on arrival a twenty-ton York refrigeration unit was installed. As soon as a cargo of beef could be loaded the ship departed for the Gulf.

In August 1915, a hurricane at Galveston reportedly left McClellan stranded half a mile inland. In spite of this incident, she would later return to service.

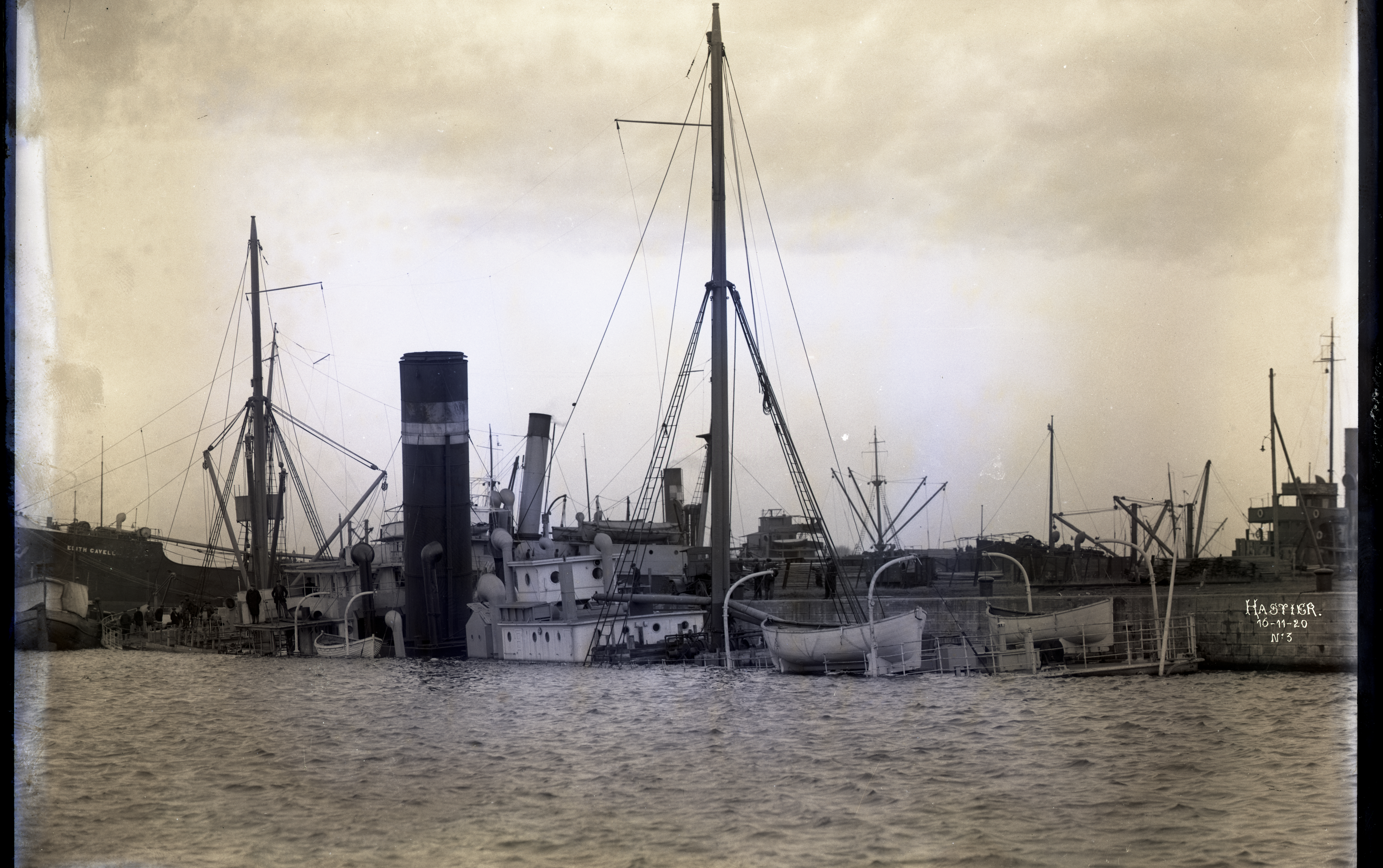
Hastier sunk at Antwerp in November 1920

=== World War I and after ===
During World War I, McClellan saw service in European waters. In 1918, the Navy was authorized to take her over, but declined to do so.

USAT McClellan was sold by the Army to Belgian company Lloyd Royal Belge SA, in December 1919, and re-entered commercial service for a short time as SS Hastier. On 27 October 1920, Hastier arrived at Antwerp, Belgium, with a fire on board, sinking a few days later on 3 November. She was raised in 1921 and laid up. Hastier was sold to Société Métallurgique de Merxem for scrapping on 11 December 1922.

== Bibliography ==
- American Bureau of Shipping (1922). 1922 Record of American and Foreign Shipping. New York: Wynkoop Hallenbeck Crawford Co. p. 886.
- American National Red Cross Relief Committee (1889): Reports: May 1898; March 1899, The Knickerbocker Press, New York.
- Stratemeyer, Edward (1904): American Boy's Life of Theodore Roosevelt, Chapter 20.
