= USS Admiral H. T. Mayo =

United States Navy transport vessel

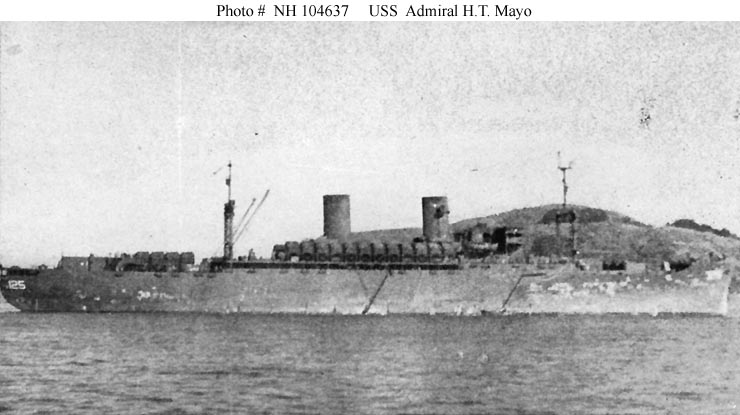
- USS Admiral H. T. Mayo in about 1945

History

United States
- Name: USS Admiral H. T. Mayo (AP-125)
- Namesake: Admiral Henry T. Mayo, US Navy
- Launched: 26 November 1944
- Commissioned: April 1945
- Renamed: USAT General Nelson M. Walker, circa 1948
- Namesake: General Nelson M. Walker, US Army
- Renamed: USNS General Nelson M. Walker (T-AP-125), 1 March 1950
- Stricken: January 1959
- Reinstated: August 1965
- Identification: IMO number: 8424537
- Decommissioned: July 1971
- Fate: Scrapped in 2005

General characteristics
- Class & type: Admiral W. S. Benson-class transport
- Displacement: 9,676 tons
- Propulsion: Turbo-electric transmission, Twin screw propellers

USS Admiral H. T. Mayo (AP-125) was a United States Navy Admiral W. S. Benson-class transport built by the Bethlehem-Alameda Shipyard, Inc., that entered service at the end of World War II. She partook in Operation Magic Carpet before being transferred to the U.S. Army for a short period, who renamed her USAT General Nelson M. Walker, before returning to the Navy. She was stricken from the Naval Vessel Register in January 1981 before being scrapped in 2005.

== History ==
=== USS Admiral H. T. Mayo (AP-125) ===
Built at Alameda, California to the Maritime Commission's P2-SE2-R1 design, she was commissioned in April 1945. After shakedown she steamed to the Atlantic and, in June, carried 5,819 released prisoners of war from Le Havre, France, to Boston. Her next voyage took her to Marseille, France, where she embarked 4,888 quartermaster and engineer troops and transported them to Okinawa, arriving in September. Admiral H. T. Mayo then began the first of several "Magic Carpet" trips, bringing servicemen home from the Western Pacific. The ship completed the last of these voyages in November 1947 from Jinsen Korea and sailed for New York, where she was decommissioned and transferred, via the Maritime Commission, to the U.S. Army.

=== USAT General Nelson M. Walker ===
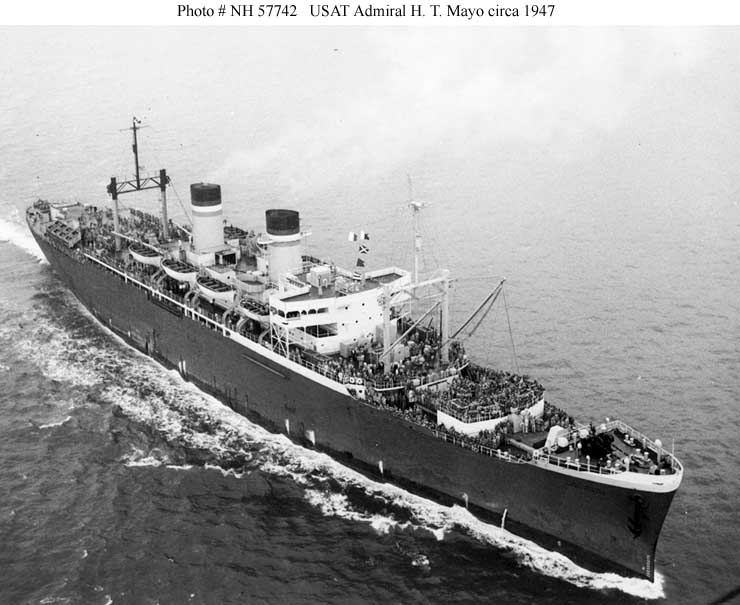
USAT Admiral H. T. Mayo: Serving as an Army transport circa 1947. The Army soon renamed her USAT General Nelson M. Walker.

The Army operated the ship with a civilian crew as part of its water transportation service and soon renamed her General Nelson M. Walker. In mid-1948 she received upgraded accommodations for military dependents.

=== First Return to Navy Service ===
Returned to the Navy in March 1950 when most of the Army's larger ships became part of the newly created Military Sea Transportation Service. Still civilian-crewed and retaining her "General" name, the ship made numerous crossings of the Pacific in support of the Korean War. To increase her troop capacity, in early 1952 she was refitted as an "austerity" transport, with most amenities removed. Later in 1952 she carried Greek and Turkish troops from their homelands to Korea, and in August 1953 she brought the first group of 328 returning American prisoners of war home from Korea. General Nelson M. Walker continued to operate in the Pacific until January 1957, when she transited to the Atlantic and carried out a single round trip voyage to Bremerhaven, West Germany. Placed in ready reserve status in February 1957, she was berthed in the Maritime Administration's Hudson River reserve fleet from June 1957 to June 1958 and again after January 1959, when she was transferred to the Maritime Administration and stricken from the Navy List.

=== Second Return to Navy service ===
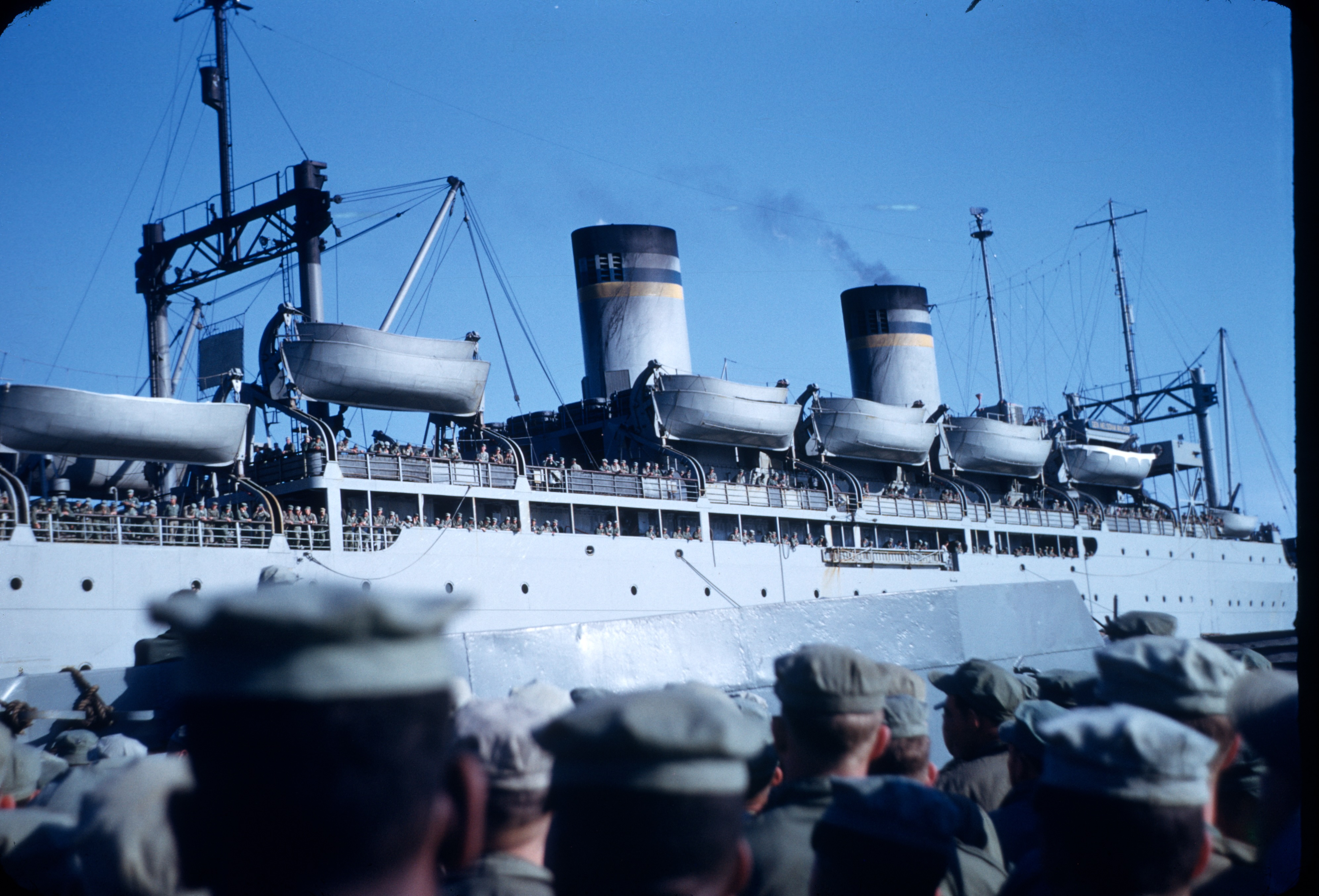
USNS General Nelson M. Walker as viewed by servicemen leaving Korea in 1953.

In August 1965 the Navy reacquired the General Nelson M. Walker, reinstating her on the Navy List with the prefix USNS to support the buildup of U.S. forces in Vietnam. On 4 January 1966, the 2nd Brigade, 25th Infantry Division of Schofield Barracks, Hawaii, boarded the General Nelson M. Walker for deployment to Vietnam. arriving in Vung Tau on 18 January 1966. The day after arriving in Vung Tau, troops boarded LSTs and were transported to shore, where they were airlifted by C-130 to Tan Son Nhut Air Base, and from there by ground convoy transport to Cu Chi. On 21 July 1966 the 1st Battalion, 22nd Infantry Regiment of Ft. Lewis Washington, boarded the General Nelson M. Walker for deployment to Vietnam. After seventeen days at sea she docked at Naha, Okinawa. On 6 August 1966, the General Nelson M. Walker dropped anchor in Qui Nhon harbor in South Vietnam. The 1st Battalion, 22nd Infantry Regiment were ferried to the beach aboard LVMs (naval landing craft capable of carrying both vehicles and troops), and then was airlifted to Pleiku by C-130 and by ground convoy transport to the 4th Infantry Division advance party location near Dragon Mountain, later renamed Camp Enari.

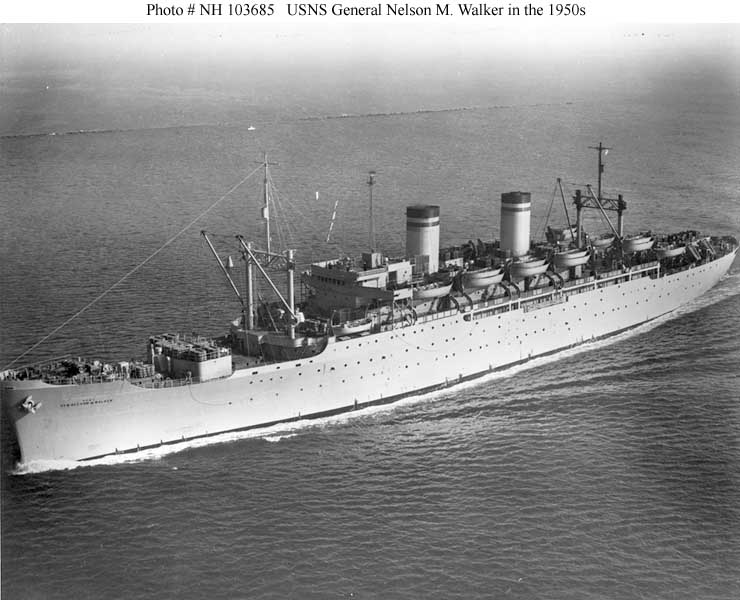
USNS General Nelson M. Walker in the 1950s.

In August 1967, the General Nelson M. Walker departed from Oakland, CA, transporting the 1st Battalion of the 1st Cavalry Regiment and the 337th Signal Company to Vietnam arriving in Da Nang harbor in September 1967. Upon arrival in Da Nang, troops boarded LSTs and were transported to the Americal Division in Chu Lai. The General Nelson M. Walker carried out troop lifts to Southeast Asia through the end of 1967 and was again inactivated at New York in early 1968.

=== Final years ===
She joined the Maritime Administration's National Defense Reserve Fleet on the James River, Virginia in April 1970 and was formally transferred to the Maritime Administration in July 1971. The transport was stricken from the Naval Vessel Register in January 1981 to clear the way for transfer to a private organization for operation as a hospital ship, but the transfer did not materialize. In December 1994 the Navy passed full ownership of the ship to the Maritime Administration, which put her on indefinite hold for possible use in civil emergencies. The hold was lifted in September 1998 and the ship was ready for disposal by June 2001. In January 2005, nearly sixty years after completion, General Nelson M. Walker was towed out of the Reserve Fleet en route to All Star Metals of Brownsville, Texas, where she was broken up for scrap.

== Awards ==
- European–African–Middle Eastern Campaign Medal
- Asiatic–Pacific Campaign Medal
- World War Two Victory Medal
- Navy Occupation Medal with "ASIA" clasp
- National Defense Service Medal with star
- Korean Service Medal with three battle stars
- Vietnam Service Medal
- United Nations Service Medal
- Republic of Vietnam Campaign Medal
