= Lynne C. Quiggle =

American naval officer (1906–1958)

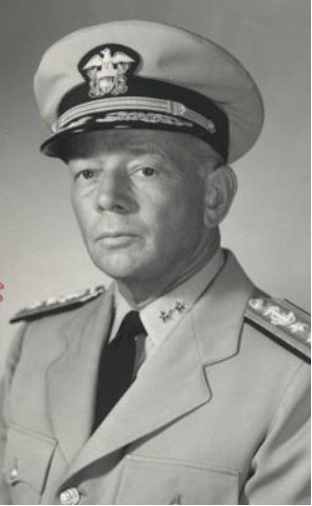
- Born: 22 May 1906; Grand Island, Nebraska
- Died: July 1958 (aged 52); North Pacific Ocean
- Burial place: Lost at sea
- Military career
- Allegiance: United States
- Branch: United States Navy
- Service years: 1924–1926, 1930–1958
- Rank: Rear Admiral
- Commands: USS Overton (DD-239); Destroyer Division 152; Destroyer Division 32; USS Mount Olympus (AGC-8); Transport Amphibious Squadron 8
- Conflicts: World War II; Neutrality Patrol; Battle of the Atlantic; Battle of Kwajalein; Battle of Eniwetok; Operation Hailstone; Cold War
- Awards: Bronze Star Medal with Combat "V"; American Defense Service Medal with Fleet Clasp; American Campaign Medal; Asiatic-Pacific Campaign Medal with two engagement stars; World War II Victory Medal; Navy Occupation Service Medal with Asia Clasp; National Defense Service Medal

Lynne Cline Quiggle (22 May 1906 – July 1958) was a rear admiral of the United States Navy. He saw service in World War II and in the Cold War before he was lost at sea in 1958.

== Early life ==
Quiggle was born in Grand Island, Nebraska, on 22 May 1906, the son of H. G. Quiggle and Frances Quiggle nee Kalous. He attended Kearney High School in Kearney, Nebraska.

== Naval career ==
=== Early career ===
After graduating from high school, Quiggle enlisted in the U.S. Navy on 12 September 1924 and received an honorable discharge on 17 June 1926. In June 1926, he accepted an appointment to the United States Naval Academy in Annapolis, Maryland. He graduated from the academy on 5 June 1930 and was commissioned as an ensign that day.

Quiggle′s first tour after graduation was aboard the battleship USS Idaho (BB-42) based at San Pedro, California, which conducted training operations while he was on board. In September 1931 he transferred to the battleship USS New York (BB-34) in the United States Pacific Fleet, which took part in Fleet Problems during his tour. He detached from New York in April 1934 and was assigned to the new heavy cruiser USS Astoria (CA-34), which then was fitting out at the Puget Sound Navy Yard in Bremerton, Washington, and he joined Astoria upon her commissioning on 28 April 1934. He was aboard Astoria for a lengthy shakedown cruise she made in the Pacific Ocean during the summer of 1934 in which she visited the Hawaiian Islands; American Samoa; Fiji; Sydney, Australia; and Nouméa on New Caledonia. Thereafter she was based at San Pedro as a unit of Cruiser Division Seven and took part in a Fleet Problem each year. In April 1936, he transferred from Astoria to the target-towing ship USS Lamberton (AG-21), which operated from San Diego, California, towing targets for surface ships, submarines. and aircraft.

Detaching from Lamberton, Quiggle took a course in general ordnance engineering at the Naval Postgraduate School, then located at Annapolis, Maryland, between June 1937 and May 1939, then continued instruction until September 1939 at the Washington Navy Yard in Washington, D.C. He then assisted in the fitting out of the destroyer USS Aaron Ward (DD-132) at the Bethlehem Steel Corporation in San Pedro. He became her executive officer upon her recommissioning on 28 October 1939. During his tour, Aaron Ward served as flagship of Destroyer Division Five in the Pacific Fleet until December 1939, when she was transferred to the United States Atlantic Fleet. Based at Key West, Florida, Aaron Ward operated as part of the Neutrality Patrol in the Gulf of Mexico and the West Indies until September 1940, when she was decommissioned and transferred to the United Kingdom for service in the Royal Navy under the terms of the destroyers-for-bases deal. Quiggle detached from Aaron Ward upon her transfer and reported for duty aboard the heavy cruiser USS Chester (CA-27). With Quiggle aboard, Chester steamed from the U.S. West Coast to the United States East Coast, where she underwent an overhaul, becoming one of the first six ships to acquire the CXAM radar, and conducted exercises until January 1941; she then steamed to her new home port at Pearl Harbor, Territory of Hawaii, arriving there in February 1941 and from which she conducted exercises in the Hawaiian Islands, made a voyage to the U.S. West Coast, and escorted United States Army transports to Manila in the Philippines. Upon completion of the Philippines voyage in November 1941, Quiggle transferred from Chester to the Office of the Chief of Naval Operations in the United States Department of the Navy in Washington, D.C.

=== World War II ===
The United States entered World War II on 7 December 1941. In February 1942, Quiggle became aide to the Chief of Naval Operations, first Admiral Harold R. Stark and from 2 March 1942 Admiral Ernest J. King. He left this position in April 1942 and in May 1942 took command of the destroyer USS Overton (DD-239), which performed convoy escort and antisubmarine warfare operations in the Atlantic Ocean, Gulf of Mexico, and Caribbean Sea under his command. He left Overton in December 1942 and reported for duty aboard the new battleship USS Iowa (BB-61), then fitting out at the Norfolk Navy Yard in Portsmouth, Virginia. He became her gunnery officer upon her commissioning on 22 February 1943. During his tour aboard her, Iowa transported President Franklin D. Roosevelt to and from the Teheran Conference in Tehran, Iran in November–December 1943, then steamed to the Pacific, where she supported U.S. Navy air strikes against Kwajalein and Eniwetok in the Marshall Islands during the Marshall Islands campaign in January–February 1943, against Truk in the Caroline Islands during Operation Hailstone on 17–18 February 1944, and against Tinian in the Mariana Islands. He received the Bronze Star Medal with Combat "V" for his tour aboard Iowa, the citation for the award stating:

For meritorious service as Gunnery Officer of the USS Iowa from February 1943 to March 1944...By his ability to organize and train the personnel of his department, [he] was in large measure responsible for bringing the gunnery crew of this newly commissioned battleship to a high state of efficiency with excellent results during her first encounter with the enemy...

From May 1944 to June 1945, Quiggle performed duties at the Bureau of Ordnance in the U.S. Department of the Navy. For his tour there, he received a letter of commendation from the chief of the bureau for his "great determination to the tremendous task of planning the production of the weapons of war..." He then returned to Iowa as her executive officer. The war ended on 15 August 1945.

== Postwar and Cold War ==
On 1 March 1946 Quiggle received a promotion to the temporary rank of captain, and that month he detached from Iowa and became a member of the Staff of the Commander-in-Chief, United States Pacific Fleet. During his tour there, he received a promotion to the permanent rank of captain on 1 January 1948, with the permanent rank dating to 1 March 1946. In September 1948, he became the commander of Destroyer Division 152, and in April 1949 he took command of Destroyer Division 32. In November 1949 he began a tour as Head of the Atlantic, European, and Middle East Section of the Strategic Plans Division in the Office of the Chief of Naval Operations.

Quiggle returned to sea in February 1953 when he became commanding officer of USS Mount Olympus (AGC-8), the flagship of Commander, Amphibious Ready Group Two, United States Atlantic Fleet. In October 1953 he began a tour with the North Atlantic Treaty Organization (NATO) as executive officer of the Plans and Operations Division on the staff of the Commander-in-Chief, Allied Forces Southern Europe. He left that position in December 1955, and in February 1956 he took command of Transport Amphibious Squadron Eight, with the attack transport USS Cambria (APA-36) as his flagship. President Dwight Eisenhower approved his promotion to rear admiral on 17 July 1956. In August 1956 he assumed duty as Resident Member, United Nations Command, Military Armistice Commission. He was assigned to the Joint Staff, Commander-in-Chief, Far East, in March 1957 and in July 1957 he became Deputy Chief of Staff, Joint Staff, Commander, United States Forces Japan. On 1 August 1957, his promotion to rear admiral went into effect.

== Personal life ==
Quiggle was married to the former Anne Griffith of Washington, D.C. They had one son.

== Death ==
In July 1958, Quiggle was aboard the ocean liner President Cleveland with his wife Anne on his way from Tokyo to California to take up duties as the commander of Amphibious Group 1 at San Diego when Anne Quiggle reported him missing from the ship. Press reporting disagrees on whether he disappeared early on the morning of 22 July or 23 July, but sources agree that his disappearance occurred when President Cleveland was in the North Pacific Ocean about 800 nautical miles (1,500 km; 920 mi) off California during a voyage from Honolulu, Territory of Hawaii, to San Francisco, California. President Cleveland′s captain reported Quiggle′s disappearance to authorities when the ship docked in San Francisco on 24 July 1958 and told the press that Quiggle had disappeared during calm weather, could not have fallen overboard, and therefore must have committed suicide by jumping overboard, adding that Quiggle had kissed his wife on the morning he disappeared and told her, "You are better off as a widow." Passengers aboard the liner told the press that Quiggle had acted peculiarly during the voyage and also conveyed the story of Quiggle′s statement to his wife. U.S. Navy personnel from the 12th Naval District immediately launched an investigation into Quiggle′s disappearance and Anne Quiggle reportedly denied that her husband had told her she would be better off as a widow before he vanished. He was presumed lost at sea, and no trace of him ever was found. Quiggle was the second of only two U.S. Navy admirals ever lost at sea. (Note: The only other U.S. Navy admiral lost at sea was Rear Admiral John W. Wilcox Jr., who was lost overboard from the battleship USS Washington (BB-56) in the North Atlantic Ocean on 27 March 1942. (See usnamemorialhall.org Virtual Memorial Hall: JOHN W. WILCOX, JR., RADM, USN and usnamemorialhall.org Virtual Memorial Hall: LYNNE C. QUIGGLE, RADM, USN))

== See also ==
- List of people who disappeared mysteriously at sea

== Honors and awards ==
- Bronze Star with Combat "V"
- American Defense Service Medal with Fleet Clasp
- American Campaign Medal
- Asiatic-Pacific Campaign Medal with two engagement stars
- World War II Victory Medal
- Navy Occupation Service Medal with Asia Clasp
- National Defense Service Medal
