= SS President Cleveland (1947) =

Passenger ship (1947–1974)

History

United States
- Name: SS President Cleveland
- Namesake: Grover Cleveland
- Operator: American President Lines
- Route: Trans-Pacific
- Builder: Bethlehem Shipbuilding Corporation, Alameda, California
- Yard number: 9509
- Laid down: 28 August 1944
- Launched: 23 June 1946
- Completed: 1947
- Identification: Official number: 254296
- Fate: Sold 9 February 1973

History

Panama
- Name: SS Oriental President
- Operator: Oceanic Cruise Development
- Route: Trans-Pacific
- Acquired: 9 February 1973
- Fate: Scrapped 1974

General characteristics
- Tonnage: 15,437 GRT; 7,768 NRT; 10,431 DWT
- Displacement: 23,504 long tons (23,881 t)
- Length: 609 ft 6 in (185.78 m) o/a; 573 ft (175 m) p/p
- Beam: 75 ft 6 in (23.01 m)
- Draft: 30 ft 2 in (9.19 m)
- Installed power: 20,000 hp (14,914 kW)
- Propulsion: Steam turbo-electric transmission; twin screw
- Speed: 20 knots (37 km/h; 23 mph)
- Capacity: 579 passengers (379 first class, 200 economy class); 193,984 cubic feet (5,493 m^{3}) cargo
- Notes: sister ship: SS President Wilson

SS President Cleveland was an American passenger ship originally ordered by the United States Maritime Commission during World War II, as one of the Admiral W. S. Benson-class Type P2-SE2-R1 transport ships, and intended to be named USS Admiral D. W. Taylor (AP-128). She became the Panamanian-flag passenger ship SS Oriental President in 1973 before being scrapped in 1974. She operated on routes in the Pacific Ocean.

== History ==
=== Construction ===
President Cleveland was originally ordered by the United States Maritime Commission during World War II, as one of the Admiral-class Type P2-SE2-R1 transport ships, and intended to serve in the United States Navy with the name USS Admiral D. W. Taylor (AP-128). The ship was laid down on 28 August 1944 at the Bethlehem Steel shipyard in Alameda, California, but was cancelled on 16 December 1944.

Redesigned for commercial passenger service, the ship was launched on 23 June 1946 with the name SS President Cleveland, and she was completed in 1947.

=== Service history ===
President Cleveland was operated by American President Lines under a bareboat charter. She appeared in the background during an Embarcadero waterfront scene in San Francisco, California, in the 1950 film Woman on the Run, featuring Ann Sheridan, at 46 minutes and 40 seconds into the film.

On 22 or 23 July 1958 (sources disagree), President Cleveland was in the Pacific Ocean about 800 nautical miles (1,500 km; 920 mi) from California during a voyage from Honolulu, Territory of Hawaii, to San Francisco when U.S. Navy Rear Admiral Lynne C. Quiggle, a passenger on board, disappeared. He was presumed to have jumped or fallen overboard.

President Cleveland appeared in the 1961 film Susan Slade, featuring Connie Stevens, Troy Donahue, Dorothy Maguire, and Lloyd Nolan, and was featured in a 1962 Britannica Films production called The Seaport, filmed in San Francisco. It is also seen at anchor in Tokyo Bay in the 1970 Japanese movie Hadaka no Jukyu-sai (Live Today, Die Tomorrow!).

President Cleveland was sold to Orient Overseas Line on 9 February 1973, re-registered in Panama, and renamed Oriental President. She was scrapped at Kaohsiung, Taiwan in 1974.
