= Army Transport Service =

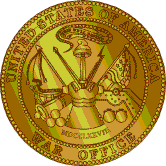
- Seal of the United States War Office
- Active: 1861 – 1945
- Country: United States of America
- Branch: Quartermaster Corps
- Type: Army
- Role: Sea-going transport service
- Part of: U.S. Department of War
- Nickname: ATS

The United States Army Transport Service (ATS) was established as a sea-going transport service that was independent of the Navy Department. ATS operated army transport ships for both troop transport and cargo service between United States ports and overseas posts. This service is often confused with the Army Transportation Service, created in France in 1917 to manage American Expeditionary Forces transport. ATS was a branch of the Quartermaster Corps responsible for land and water transport, becoming a separate United States Army Transportation Corps on July 31, 1942.

== History ==
=== Civil War ===
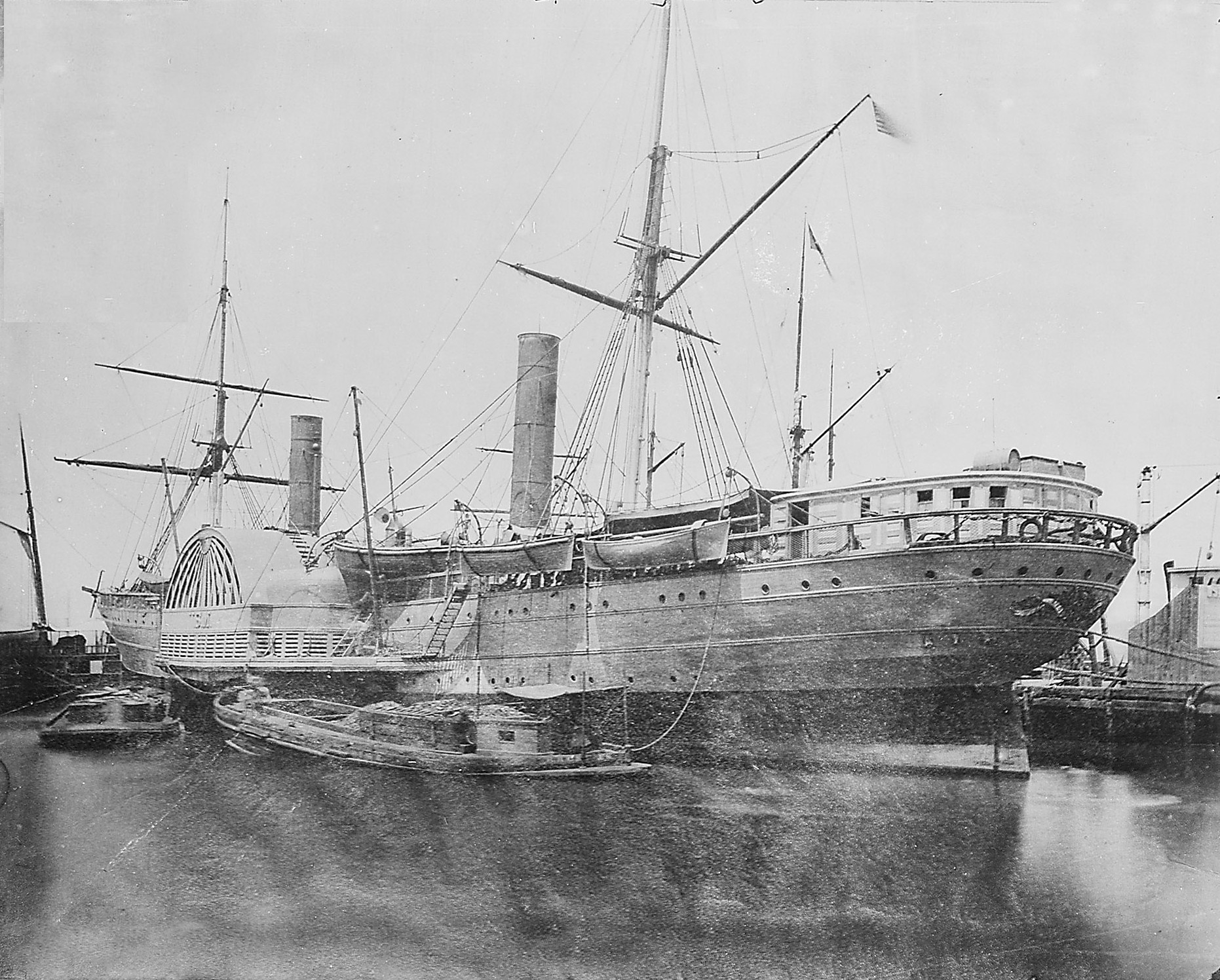
SS Fulton, chartered by Union Army in ATS during American Civil War.

During the American Civil War the United States Department of War expanded. It handled the recruiting, training, supply, medical care, transportation and pay of two million soldiers, comprising both the regular army and the much larger temporary volunteer army. The war department established a sea-going transport service of its own, independent of the Navy Department. ATS was maintained as a branch of the Quartermasters' Department. A fleet of steamboats and pilot-boats were used in the military campaigns in the Eastern Carolinas. This was the origin of the United States Army Transport Service. Many battles were won because of the Army Admiral's ability to swiftly and effectively move troops and supplies. At this time the United States Army was small and generally assigned to defend the nation's frontiers from attacks by Indians. The Union Army was part of the U.S. Department of War and was the army that fought for the Union during the American Civil War.

A large number of ships were bought or chartered by the U. S. Government for transport service. The steamer CSS Fanny was armed as a gunboat and operated by the Quartermaster Department of the Union Army during the American Civil War. The SS Fulton and SS Arago were chartered by the Union Army in the Army Transport Service, for use as a troop transport and in operation with the South Atlantic Blockading Squadron throughout the war. ATS operated between New York, Port Royal, South Carolina and New Orleans, Louisiana. At the close of the war, the fleet of 590 ocean transports in service on July 1, 1865, was reduced to 53 vessels by June 30, 1866. Most of them were discharged soon after.

=== Spanish–American War ===
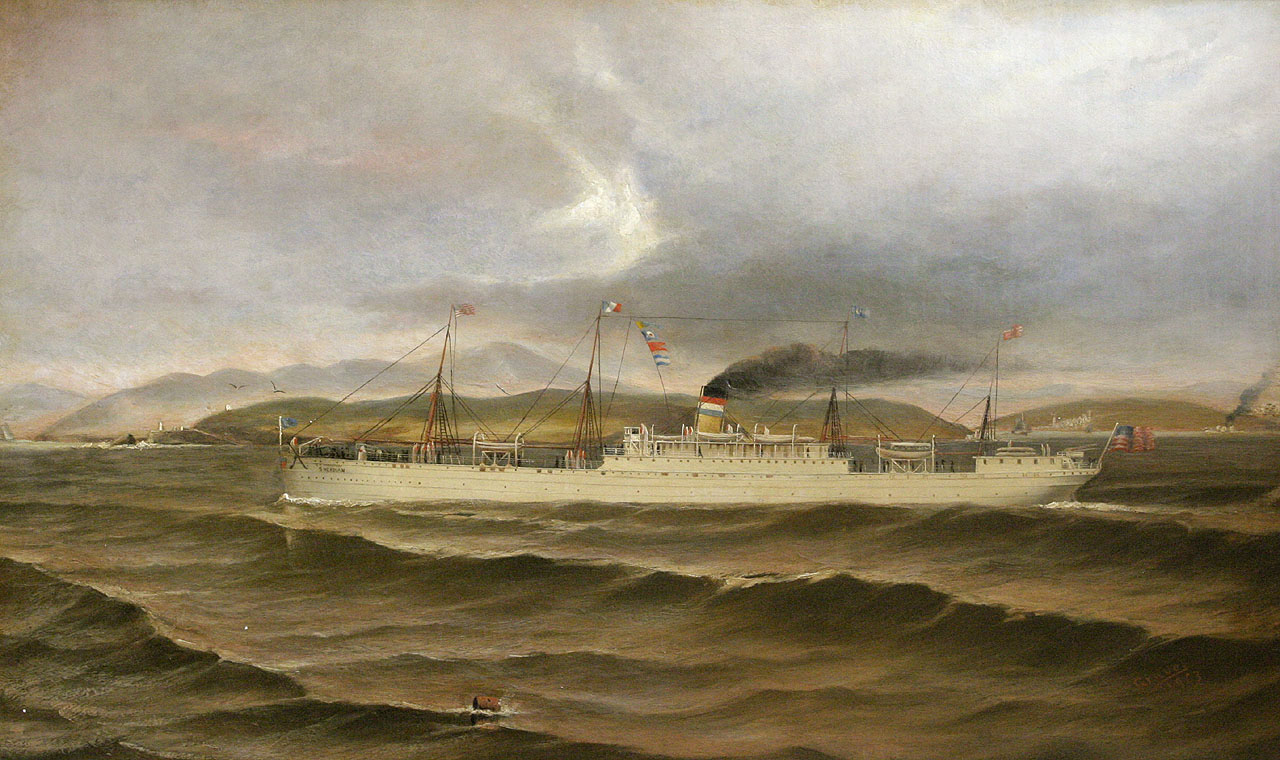
USAT Sherman, U.S. Army Transport, painted by Captain Graves.

After the Civil War, the ATS disappeared after the signing of peace at Appomattox, but was reestablished in the fall of 1898 when the Army's difficulty in transporting its forces to Cuba and Puerto Rico during the Spanish–American War was exposed. Ocean-going shipping was recruited from the Merchant Marine.

American political leaders preferred to acquire American ships to support the war effort, rather than enrich foreigners and rely on foreign crews. There were also legal constraints on using neutral-flagged vessels in American military operations. Through some quirks in the Congressional funding of the war, the US Navy was able to charter transport ships prior to the declaration of war and tied-up the best of the American merchant fleet for its use. When the Army was able to begin acquiring ships after the declaration of war, fewer domestic options remained. To gain significant shipping quickly, the Atlantic Transport Line was approached. While it was British-flagged, it was American owned, making it a more attractive option.

Army Colonel Frank J. Hecker approached the Atlantic Transport Line to charter its fleet, and was refused. He then offered to buy the vessels he sought and a deal was struck, subject to the approval of the Secretary of War Russel Alger. The Atlantic Transport Line sold Manitoba, Massachusetts, Mohawk, Mobile, Michigan, Mississippi, and Minnewaska. These ships were placed under the Quartermaster's Department of the United States Army. Manitoba became USAT Logan, Massachusetts became USAT Sheridan, Mohawk became USAT Grant, Mobile became USAT Sherman, Mississippi became USAT Buford, and Minnewaska became USAT Thomas. These and other ships acquired during the Spanish-American War were the core of the Army Transport Service's ocean-going fleet until World War I.

ATS operated the Army's large ships but did not operate smaller vessels of the harbor boat service (tugs, launches, small and short range supply boats), the mine planters of the Coast Artillery Corps or any vessels of the Corps of Engineers.

=== World War I ===
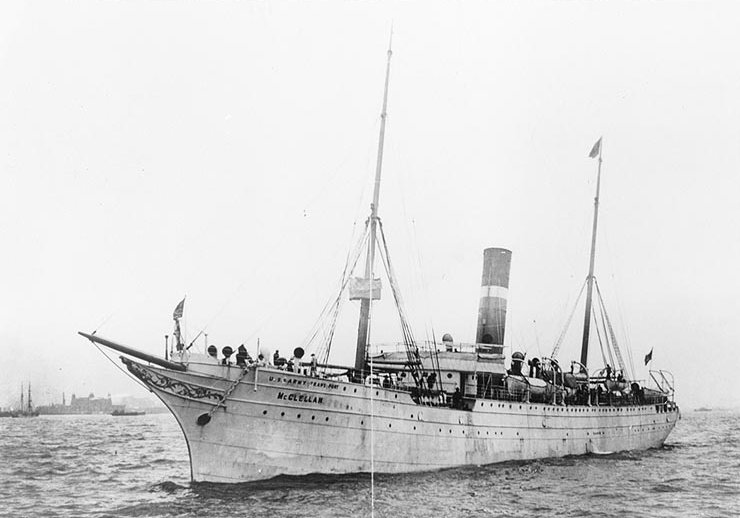
USAT McClellan (Transport, 1898–1919)

During World War I, ATS operated Army transport ships for both troop transport and cargo service between United States ports and overseas posts. The USAT McClellan was a United States Army transport ship that saw service during the Spanish–American War and World War I. Except during World War I, when the Army's large transports were turned over to the Naval Overseas Transportation Service (NOTS), ATS operated the sometimes sizable fleet of Army transports.

Special regulations for the Army Transport Service were documented by the United States War Office in 1918. They included topics like: general duties of officers, flags and general provisions for movements by sea.

=== World War II ===
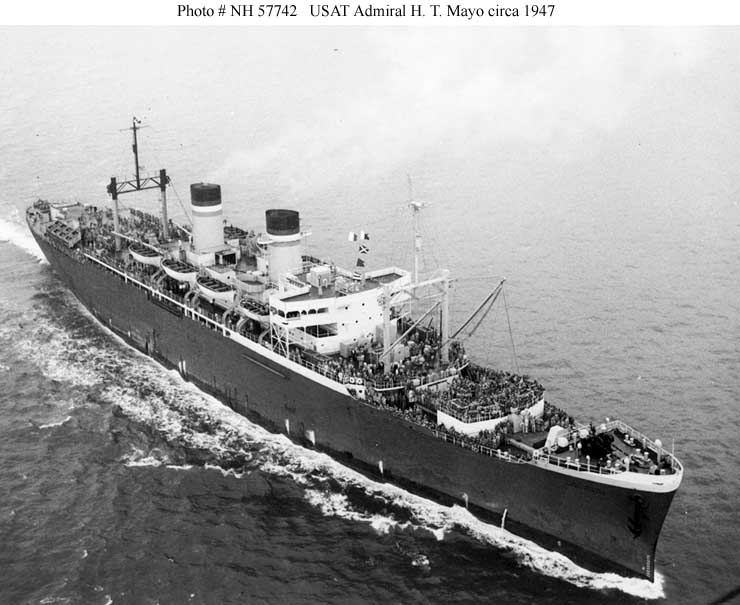
USAT Admiral H. T. Mayo: Serving as an Army transport circa 1947. The Army soon renamed her USAT General Nelson M. Walker.

The USAT Admiral H. T. Mayo served as an Army transport at the end of World War II.

During peacetime ATS was to operate directly under the Quartermaster General through a General superintendent at home ports and in wartime, when formal ports of embarkation were to be established, ATS would come under the port commander's jurisdiction. During the interwar period, ATS Atlantic was based at the New York General Depot, Army Supply Base, in Brooklyn and ATS Pacific and the transport docks were at the San Francisco General Depot, Fort Mason, California. The Army considered maintenance of a nucleus of military personnel, intimately familiar with both military requirements, port and ship operations, that could form the core of a full port of embarkation staff in wartime or other emergency as one of the reasons for maintaining ATS itself. Coordination with other Army transport functions was aided by the fact ATS was one of the four interwar divisions of the Army Transportation Service which also had divisions responsible for rail, motor and animal transport.

ATS itself became absorbed into the Water Division of the United States Transportation Corps and operated the United States Army Transports. However, the Army Transport Service name continued to be applied to the large ship branch of the Water division. The vessels themselves were commanded by civilian merchant mariners with a civilian crew. The large troop transports had military representatives or the Quartermaster or Transportation Corps aboard that were designated as transport commanders, on larger vessels with extended staff, with authority over all embarked personnel but no authority over the ship itself. On smaller vessels or cargo ships a single officer would represent the Corps. The ships were not armed except during wartime when naval type guns were installed. During World War II the guns were manned by Naval Armed Guard gun crews. Naval personnel, either Armed Guard or communications were under their own commander independent of ship's master or Corps representatives in tactical matters.

Six Liberty ships were converted at Point Clear, Alabama into floating aircraft repair depots, operated by the ATS, starting in April 1944, to provide mobile depot support for B-29 Superfortress and P-51 Mustangs based on Guam, Iwo Jima, and Okinawa beginning in December 1944. They were also fitted with landing platforms to accommodate four R-4 helicopters, creating the first seagoing helicopter-equipped ships, and provided medical evacuation of combat casualties in both the Philippines and Okinawa.

After World War II the Army's large transports resumed peacetime operation for a brief time until Cold War between the United States and the Soviet Union. On June 28, 1950, President Harry S. Truman established the Transportation Corps as a permanent branch of the Army.

== See also ==
- Transportation Corps
- List of ships of the United States Army

== Bibliography ==
- Clay, Steven E. (2011). U. S. Army Order Of Battle 1919-1941 (PDF). Volume 4. The Services: Quartermaster, Medical, Military Police, Signal Corps, Chemical Warfare, And Miscellaneous Organizations, 1919-41. Vol. 4. Fort Leavenworth, KS: Combat Studies Institute Press. ISBN 9780984190140. LCCN 2010022326. Archived from the original (PDF) on 16 September 2012.
- War Department (1918). Special Regulations No. 71: Army Transport Service. War Department Regulation. Washington, DC: United States Department of War.
- War Department (1944). FM55-10 Water Transportation: Oceangoing Vessels (PDF). War Department Field Manual. Washington, DC: United States Department of War.
- Wardlow, Chester (1999). The Technical Services—The Transportation Corps: Responsibilities, Organization, and Operations. United States Army In World War II. Washington, DC: Center Of Military History, United States Army. LCCN 99490905.
- United States Congress; House Committee on Merchant Marine and Fisheries (1921). Transport Service of the Government: Hearings Before the Committee on the Merchant Marine and Fisheries, House of Representatives, Sixty-Seventh Congress. Washington, DC: Government Printing Office.
- War Department (1929). Army List and Directory, January 1, 1929. Washington, DC: Government Printing Office.
