= USAT Sheridan =

U.S. Army troopship

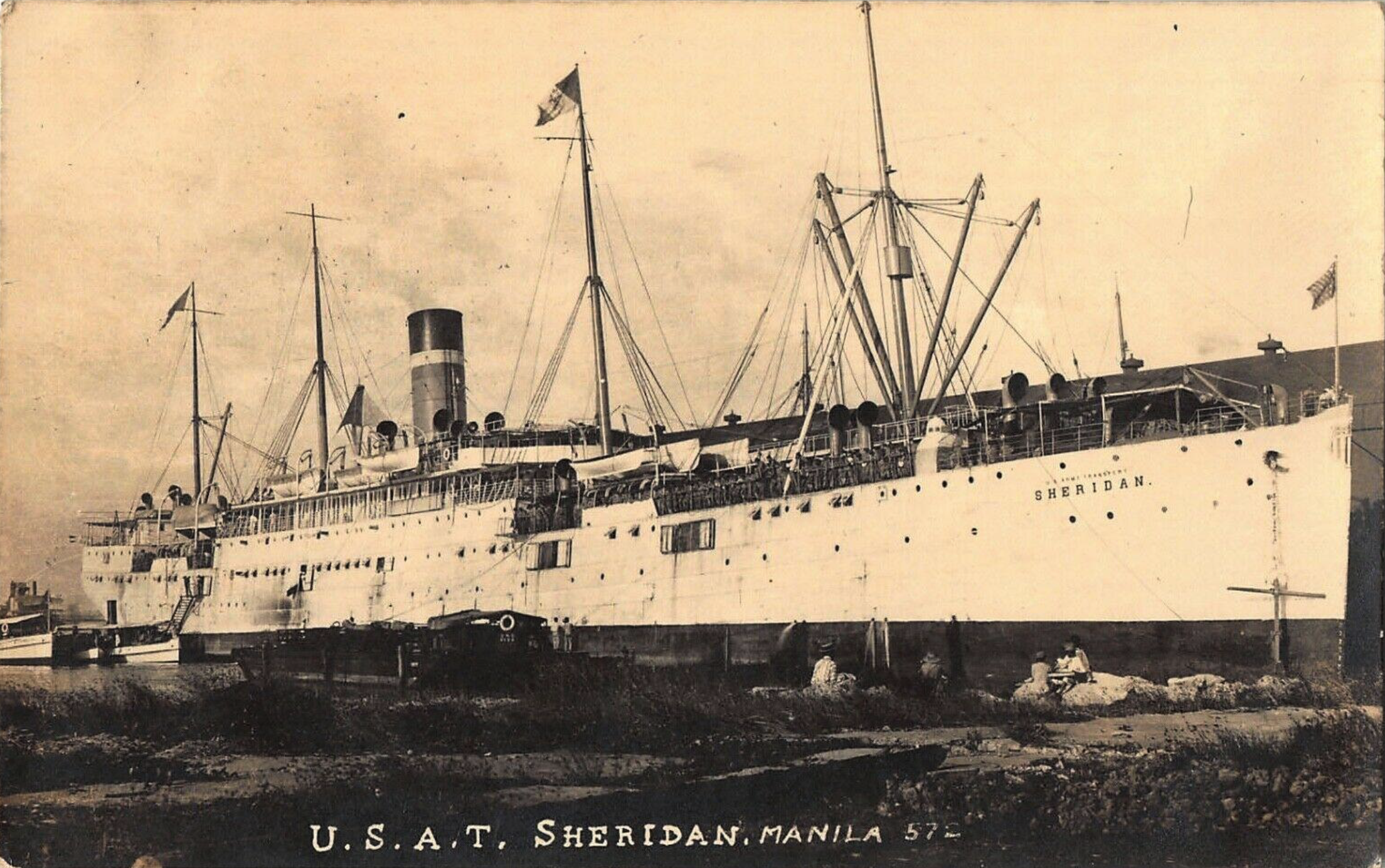
- USAT Sheridan in Manila

History

United Kingdom
- Name: Massachusetts (1891–1898)
- Operator: Atlantic Transport Line
- Builder: Harland & Wolff, Belfast
- Launched: 17 December 1891
- Home port: London, England
- Identification: Official number 99046
- Fate: Sold for $660,000

United States
- Name: Massachusetts (1898–1899); Sheridan (1900–1923)
- Operator: Army Transport Service
- Home port: Fort Mason, California
- Identification: Radio call sign: ATS (1907); WXJ (1913)
- Fate: Sold for $20,250

General characteristics
- Tonnage: 5,673 GRT; 3,654 NRT
- Displacement: 7,496 long tons (7,616 t)
- Length: 445.5 ft (135.8 m)
- Beam: 49 ft 3 in (15.01 m)
- Draft: 24 ft (7.3 m)
- Depth of hold: 30 ft (9.1 m)
- Decks: 5
- Installed power: 1,200 hp (890 kW)
- Propulsion: 2 x triple-expansion steam engines
- Speed: 13.5 knots

The steamship Massachusetts was steel-hulled freighter built for the Atlantic Transport Line in 1891. She carried live cattle and frozen beef from the United States to England until the advent of the Spanish–American War. In 1898 she was purchased by the United States Army for use as an ocean-going troopship. During the Spanish–American War she carried troops and supplies between the U.S. mainland, Cuba, and Puerto Rico.

After the war, she was renamed USAT Sheridan and was fitted for service in the Pacific, supporting U.S. bases in Hawaii, Guam, and the Philippines. In addition to her regular supply missions, she transported American troops to several conflicts in the Pacific, including the Philippine Insurrection, the 1911 Revolution in China, and the Siberian Intervention of World War I. Her last sailing in government service was in March 1921. The ship was sold and scrapped in 1923.

== Construction and characteristics ==
The Atlantic Transport Line commissioned four sister ships to be built by the Harland & Wolff Shipyard in Belfast, Northern Ireland. They were, in order of launch, Massachusetts, Manitoba, Mohawk, and Mobile.

Massachusetts' hull was built of steel plates. She was 445.5 feet (135.8 m) long, with a beam of 49.2 feet (15.0 m) and a depth of hold of 30 feet (9.1 m). Her gross register tonnage was 5,673, and her net register tonnage was 3,654. She displaced 7,496 long tons (7,616 t).

She was driven by two manganese-bronze propellers. These were turned by two triple-expansion steam engines which were also built by Harland & Wolff. They had high, medium, and low-pressure cylinders with diameters of 22.5 inches, 36.5 inches, and 60 inches, respectively, with a stroke of 48 inches. Each of the engines was rated at 600 horsepower (450 kW). Steam was provided by two coal-fired boilers. At full speed she would burn 60 tons of coal per day.

Massachusetts' cargo capacity was built primarily to support the shipment of American beef to England, both in the form of live cattle and refrigerated dressed beef. She was fitted out to transport 1,000 live cattle, and could carry 1,000 tons of fresh meat in her refrigerated holds. She was also fitted with a salon and first-class cabins for 80 passengers. There was no accommodation for steerage passengers.

Massachusetts was launched from the Harland & Wolff shipyard on Queen's Island on 17 December 1891. She then had her engines and boilers installed. The ship was completed on 5 March 1892.

== Atlantic Transport Line service (1892–1898) ==
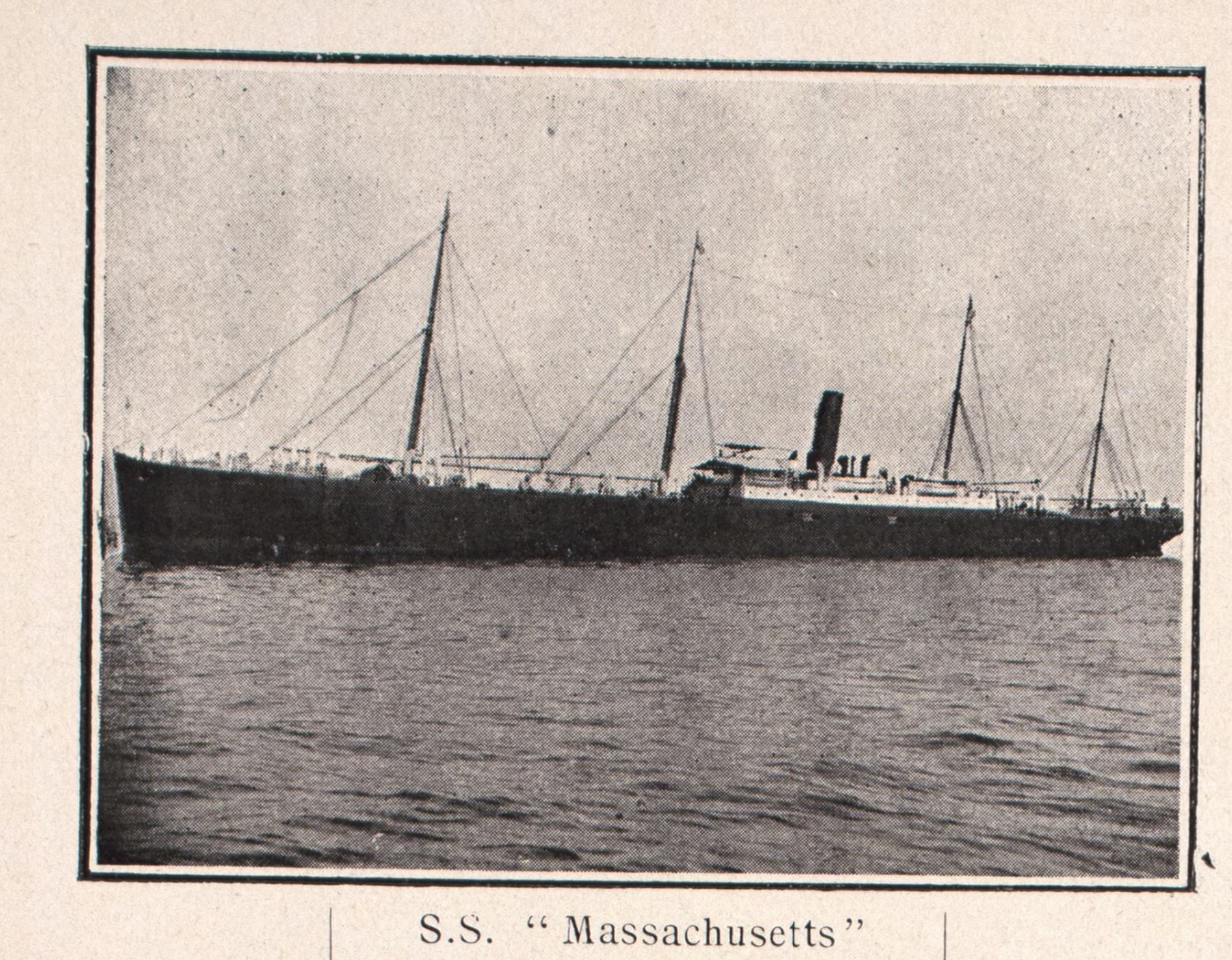
Massachusetts, c. 1897

While the Atlantic Transport Line was controlled by American shipping magnate Bernard N. Baker, its operations were run from Britain. Massachusetts' home port was London and she was registered as a British ship. During her six-year career with Atlantic Transport Line she was assigned to the New York to London route.

Massachusetts proved exceptionally capable at moving cattle across the Atlantic. In the first half of 1892, on her first few crossings, she brought 998 cattle to England and only two died en route. Since horses could be shipped using the same facilities as cattle, Massachusetts occasionally shipped horses across the Atlantic. In August 1893, the ship transported the racehorse Ormonde from London to New York, after he was purchased for $150,000 by a California breeder. British Army representatives to the 1893 Columbian Exposition in Chicago also sailed with their livestock. Massachusetts brought 300 British soldiers and 80 horses from London. She arrived in New York on 5 April 1893.

Massachusetts sailed with even more varieties of livestock in 1897 and 1898 when she transported the Barnum & Bailey Circus to London. Her passengers included elephants, zebras, camels, and horses.

== US Army service (1898–1922) ==
=== Spanish–American War service (1898) ===
On 25 April 1898, Congress declared war on Spain, beginning the Spanish–American War. An immediate objective was to defeat Spain in the Caribbean, taking Cuba and Puerto Rico. At the time, the United States had few overseas possessions, and thus its military had limited ocean-capable sealift to support such an offensive. American political leaders preferred to acquire American ships to support the war effort, rather than enrich foreigners and rely on foreign crews. There were also legal constraints on using neutral-flagged vessels in American military operations. Through some quirks in the Congressional funding of the war, the US Navy was able to charter transport ships prior to the declaration of war and tied-up the best of the American merchant fleet for its use. When the US Army was able to begin acquiring ships after the declaration of war, fewer domestic options remained. While the Atlantic Transport Line was British-flagged, it was American owned, making it a more attractive option.

Army Colonel Frank J. Hecker approached the Atlantic Transport Line to charter its fleet, and was refused. He then offered to buy the vessels he sought and a deal was struck, subject to the approval of the Secretary of War Russel Alger. In addition to Massachusetts, the Atlantic Transport Line sold Manitoba, Mohawk, Mobile, Michigan, Mississippi, and Minnewaska. These ships were placed under the Quartermaster's Department of the US Army. The Army reckoned Massachusetts' capacity to be 80 officers, 1,000 men, and 1,000 horses. Massachusetts arrived in New York from London on her last trip for the Atlantic Transport Line on 11 July 1898. She was unloaded and turned over to the government on 14 July 1898. The purchase price of the ship was $660,000.

Massachusetts underwent little conversion for military use. She was ordered to sail from New York for Newport News to begin embarking troops on 19 July 1898, just five days after her purchase. By that time the fighting was all but over. Hostilities ceased on 12 August 1898. She arrived in Newport News on 23 July 1898 and began embarking troops to reinforce the American offensive on Puerto Rico. The transport departed on 28 July 1898 for Ponce. Aboard were the Philadelphia City Troop, Troops A and C of the New York Volunteer Cavalry, and a number of other units totaling 805 men, 454 horses, and 426 mules.

Massachusetts arrived off Ponce on 3 August 1898 and promptly went aground on the Cabeza de Muerte reef. The men and livestock were lightered ashore, some 700 men aboard USS Prairie, while the ship was still on the reef. An incipient mutiny was quelled when captain John Findley, who had done good service for the Atlantic Transport Line, proved unequal to running Massachusetts as a troopship and was put ashore in Ponce. The ship was pulled off the reef by USS Saturn on 6 August 1898. Once in deep water again, the ship sailed to Arroya to discharge her cargo. Massachusetts sailed from there to Santiago, Cuba. The ship endured fires in her coal bunkers both in Santiago and at sea. She sailed from Santiago on 23 September 1898 and reached New York on 28 September 1898.

Upon her return to New York, Massachusetts went into dry dock for repairs. Her ill luck continued, however, and she hit an uncharted reef in New York Harbor in December 1898. She went back to the shipyard for repairs and for conversion to a troopship capable of supporting the Army in the Pacific.

=== Preparation for Pacific service (1899) ===
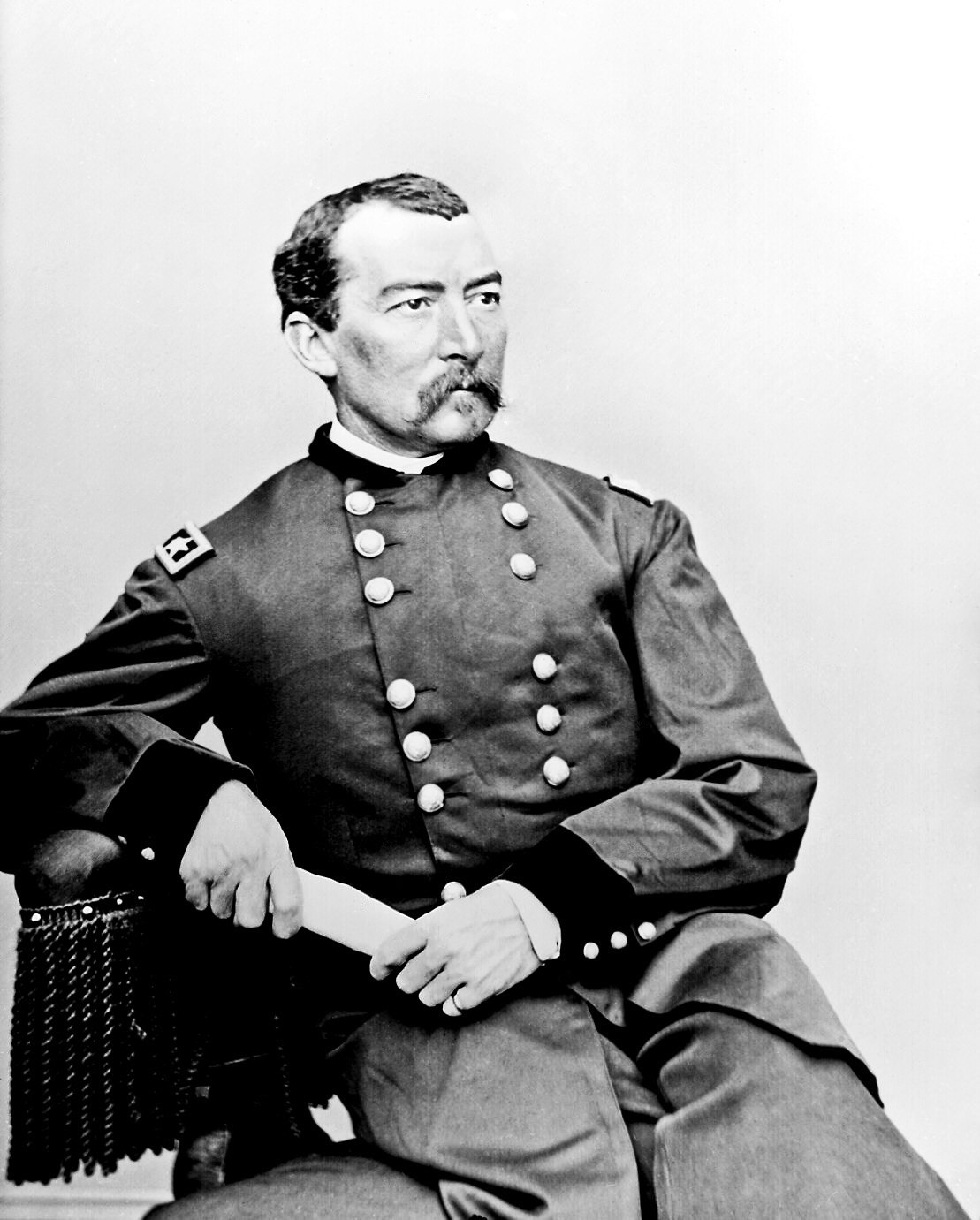
General Phillip Sheridan, Sheridan's namesake

Having taken Cuba, Puerto Rico, Guam, and the Philippines, the Army had a permanent need for transport to overseas bases. The annexation of Hawaii in 1898 also required new ocean transport. The Army Transport Service chose the best vessels acquired during the war to become a permanent sealift capability. Massachusetts and her three sister ships were retained for this purpose. To mark their transition to permanent military service, they were renamed in January 1899. Massachusetts became United States Army Transport Sheridan, named for Civil War General Phillip Sheridan.

On 19 February 1899, Sheridan sailed from New York, bound for Manila, via the Suez Canal. She had a full load, including the 12th Infantry Regiment, the 3rd battalion of the 17th Infantry Regiment, 2,300 shells for field artillery, several hundred thousand rounds of small arms ammunition, and tons of other cargo. Her passengers included 57 officers, 1,796 enlisted men, and 56 women and children, family members of the troops. She stopped at Gibralter for water and coal in March 1899, but due to a measles outbreak on board was held in quarantine. She stopped at Malta a few days later to give the troops some time beyond the crowded confines of the ship. A review of the nearly 2,000 American soldiers by Sir Francis Grenfell, Governor of Malta, and Admiral Sir John Ommaney Hopkins, Commander-In-Chief of British naval forces in the Mediterranean was organized. Sheridan reached Port Said on 16 March 1899, Colombo by 1 April, Singapore on 10 April, and finally arrived in Manila on 15 April 1899.

After disembarking her troops and unloading her cargo in Manila, she sailed to San Francisco on 22 April 1899. Sheridan had on board the remains of 18 soldiers who had died in the Philippines, and 103 soldiers, discharged soldiers, and soldiers' family members. She arrived at her new home port, via a coaling stop in Nagasaki, on 22 May 1899.

As configured for her Pacific service, Sheridan's authorized complement was 13 officers and 172 crew. As she sailed, her crew was typically between 175 and 200 officers and men.

=== Philippine Insurrection (1899–1900) ===
Sheridan had a quick shipyard visit in San Francisco to repair boiler problems, and then began preparing for her next trip to Manila. There was an urgent need for troops and supplies in the Philippines to prosecute American goals in the Philippine-American War. Sheridan was in almost constant motion in a variety of roles. In November 1899, for instance, she acted as an assault transport, landing troops at Lingayen Gulf to cut off an insurgent retreat. Details of Sheridan's trans-Pacific trips during this period are shown in the table below.

Sheridan trans-Pacific trips 1899-1900
Departure	From	To	Arrival	Units Embarked
24 June 1899	San Francisco	Manila	24 July 1899	Troops A & F 4th Cavalry Regiment Companies D & H 14th Infantry Regiment 1,248 unassigned troops
10 August 1899	Manila	San Francisco	7 September 1899	1st South Dakota Volunteer Infantry Regiment (667 men) 13th Minnesota Volunteer Infantry Regiment (996 men) 205 discharged troops
30 September 1899	San Francisco	Manila	27 October 1899	33rd Volunteer Infantry Regiment 3 companies 32nd Volunteer Infantry Regiment
9 November 1899	Manila	San Francisco	5 December 1899	3 passengers
17 January 1900	Tacoma	Manila	10 February 1900	Hay, meat, supplies
6 March 1900	Manila	San Francisco	1 April 1900	264 Army & Navy sick, discharged, and prisoners

=== Pacific service (1900–1918) ===
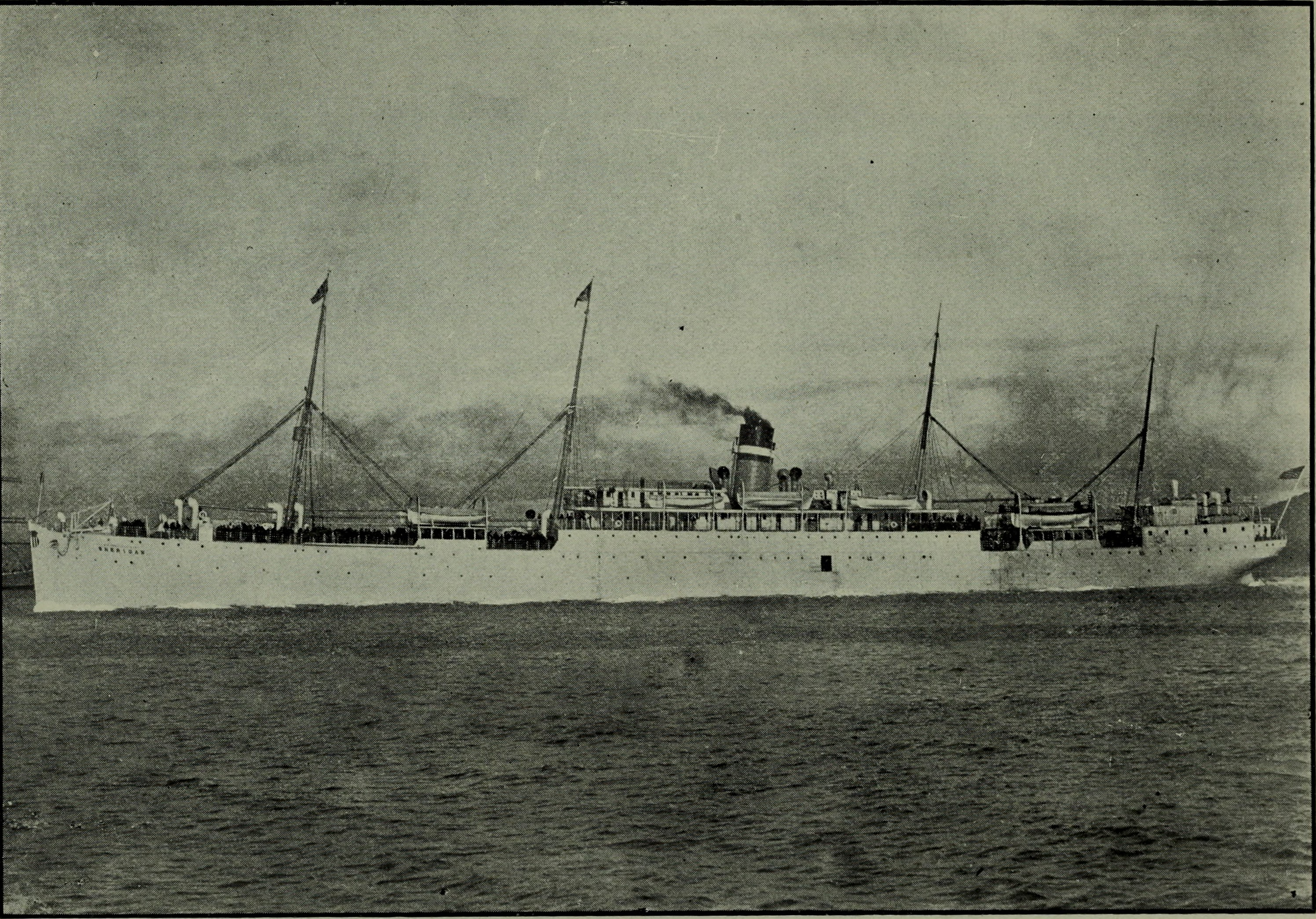
Sheridan in 1905

In April 1900, Sheridan was pulled out of service to undergo a substantial refit at the Fulton Iron Works in San Francisco. The electric light and refrigeration plants were rebuilt, decks were rebuilt and strengthened, staterooms were added for both passengers and ships' officers, the dining salon was extended, and numerous other improvements accomplished. The cost of this work was $339,169. Her first sailing after the overhaul left San Francisco on 17 November 1900 with roughly 400 personnel bound for Manila.

Sheridan began a regular shuttle service between San Francisco, Honolulu, Guam, and Manila. The Army Transport Service maintained a roughly monthly schedule of sailings from San Francisco using Sheridan, USAT Logan, USAT Sherman, and USAT Thomas. The ships carried supplies, cash, and fresh troops to the Philippines, and relieved, discharged, wounded, and dead troops back to the United States. Many officers brought their wives and children aboard as cabin passengers. In addition to Army personnel, the ship also routinely transported US Marines, and US Navy personnel.

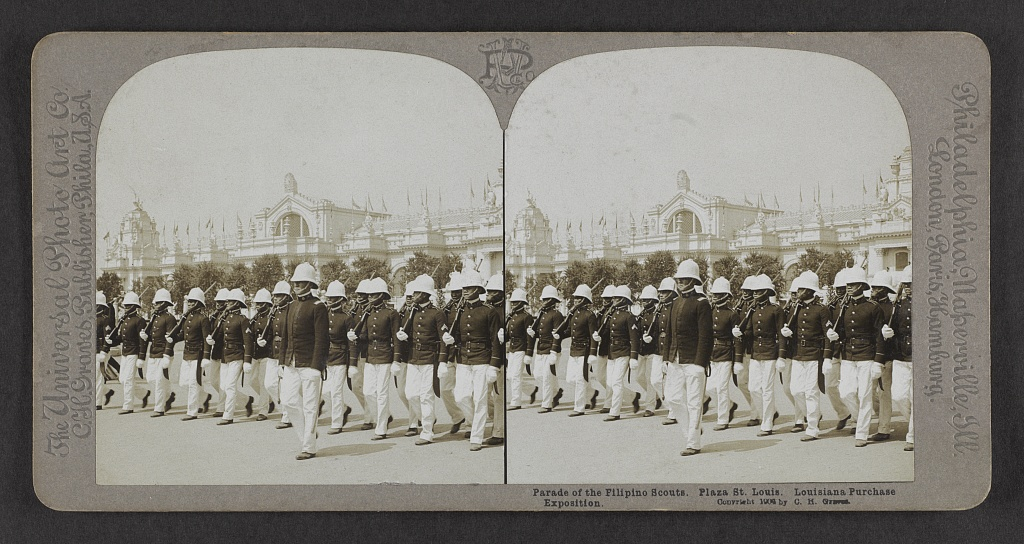
Sheridan carried Philippine Scouts across the Pacific to participate in the Louisiana Purchase Exposition

The first-class service offered to Sheridan's cabin passengers attracted many notables, including Governor-General of the Philippines Arthur MacArthur jr., Major General Adolphus W. Greely, commander of the Army Signal Corps, Major Generals John F. Weston, Arthur Murray, and Lloyd Wheaton, Brigadier Generals John C. Bates, Frederick D. Grant, and Frederick Funston, and Inspector General Peter D. Vroom. Another set of notable passengers were several hundred Philippine Scouts and Manila constabulary who participated in the Louisiana Purchase Exposition in 1904.

Sheridan continued her regular Pacific crossings until September 1905 when she went to the Union Iron Works in San Francisco for an overhaul. Her first sailing for Manila after the overhaul left San Francisco on 26 January 1906 with the 24th Infantry Regiment embarked.

==== Hawaii grounding ====
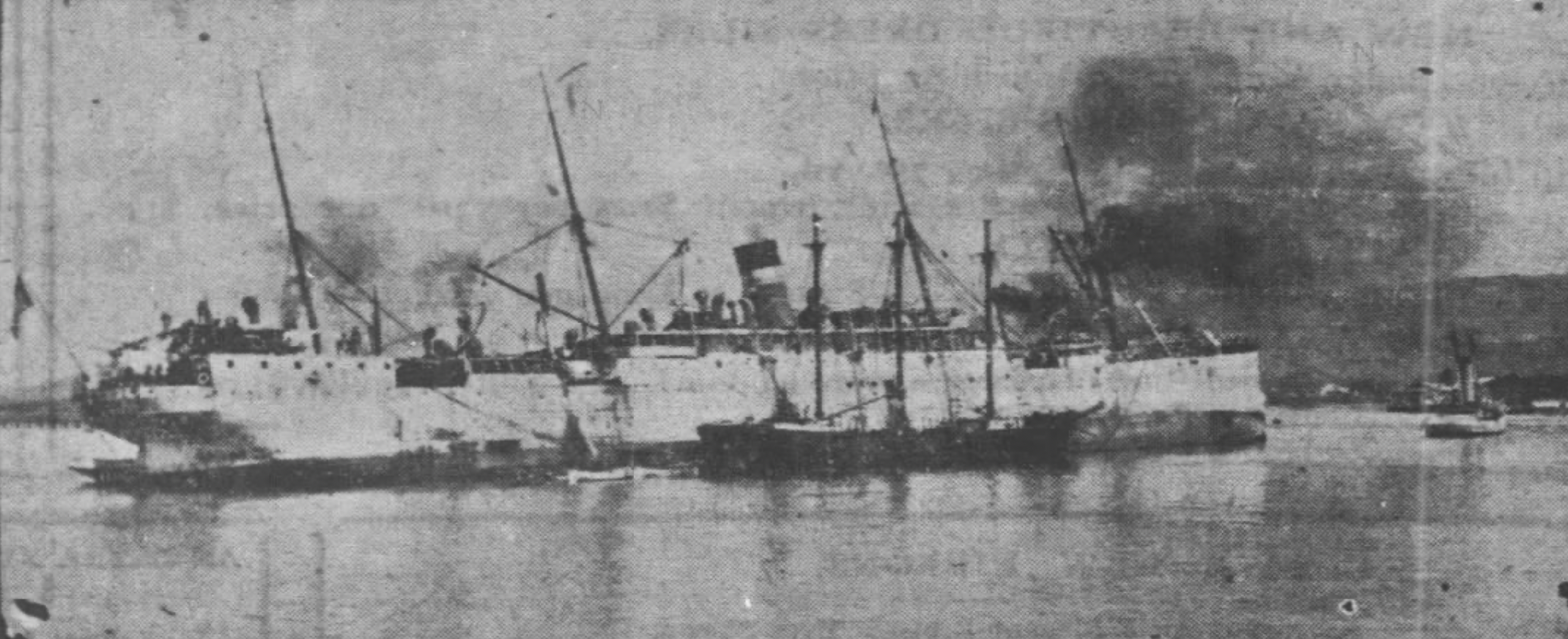
Sheridan being towed into Pearl Harbor after her 1906 grounding

Sheridan's routine trans-Pacific trip came to an abrupt end on 31 August 1906 when she was returning to Hawaii from Manila. The ship ran hard aground off Barber's Point, Oahu. Her passengers and cargo were taken ashore by smaller vessels, but she remained firmly on the rocks. After several days, flooding exceeded the ship's pumping capacity and her boiler fires were extinguished, leaving the ship without power. Sheridan was refloated on 1 October 1906 and taken under tow by USAT Buford. She began to take on more water, however, and was beached to prevent her sinking. Steam-engine-powered pumps were installed on Sheridan's deck, and with their aid the ship was pulled off the beach on 6 October. She was listing to port and there was concern that she might capsize. To improve her stability, she was lashed to a barge on her port side and the scow Melanchthon on her starboard side. She was taken under tow by USS Iroquois which finally brought her to a dock in Pearl Harbor.

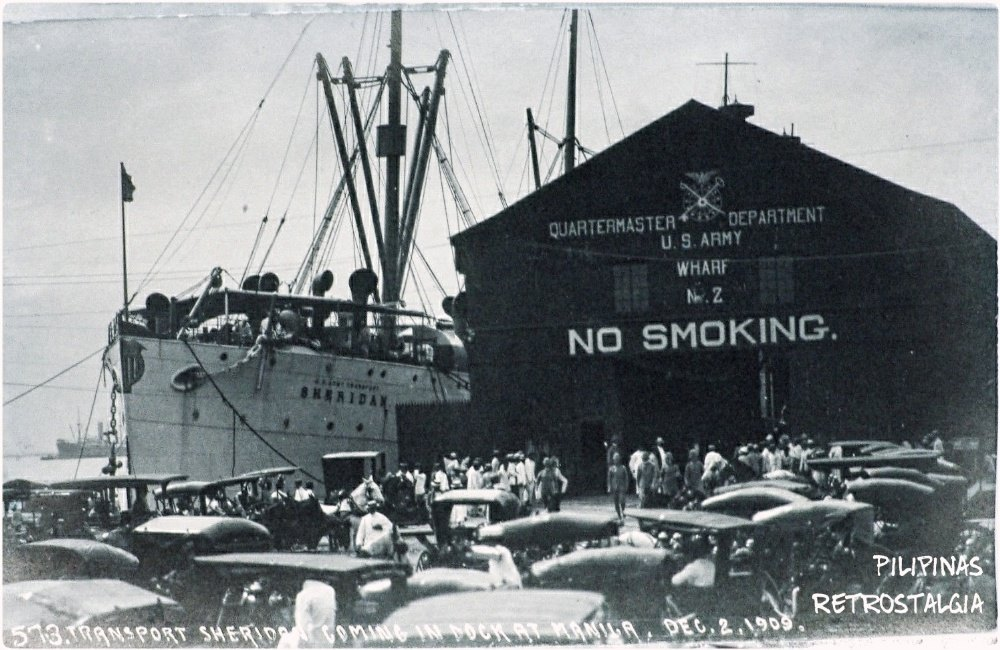
Sheridan at the Quartermaster's dock in Manila in 1909

Temporary repairs to Sheridan's hull were made in Hawaii. The Army tug Slocum and USAT Buford took her in tow on 9 November 1906, bound for San Francisco. The trio arrived there on 22 November 1906. The Army opened bids to repair the damage on 29 January 1907. Due to the size of the contract, competition was intense and controversial. Finally, the Mare Island Naval Shipyard was awarded a $400,000 contract on 23 April 1907. In addition to the repairs to hull plating and framing, work was done to modernize the ship, such as the installation of a new sick bay. This work included the installation of a 3 kilowatt radio transmitter. She is recorded to have the wireless call sign "ATS" in 1907, which was changed to "WXJ" by 1913. Sheridan finally left the shipyard, her repairs complete, on 18 April 1908. The ship resumed her place in the Army's trans-Pacific rotation, sailing for Manila on 5 May 1908.

==== Alaska Service ====
Sheridan had a break from her usual trans-Pacific sailings when she left San Francisco on 2 June 1912 with the 30th Infantry Regiment aboard. After a stop in Seattle, she sailed to Fort William H. Seward in Haines, Alaska. Men of the 30th relieved four companies of the 16th Infantry Regiment, who took their places on Sheridan. The ship next called at Fort Liscum, near the present site of Valdez, Alaska, where she relieved men of the 16th with companies G and H of the 30th. Her next port of call was to be Fort St Michael near the mouth of the Yukon River. She had to bypass it because the sea ice was too thick to reach the shore. In attempting to reach Nome, her northernmost destination, the ship was caught in sea ice for six days. She finally was able to anchor off Fort Davis on 28 June 1912, and did reach Fort St Michael on her southbound trip. She returned to San Francisco on 22 July 1912 with the 16th Infantry regiment aboard.

Upon returning from Alaska, Sheridan was in need of maintenance and sailed only once, and that just to Honolulu and back, until April 1914. She then resumed her regular shuttle service to Manila.

=== Allied Expeditionary Force Siberia (1918–1920) ===
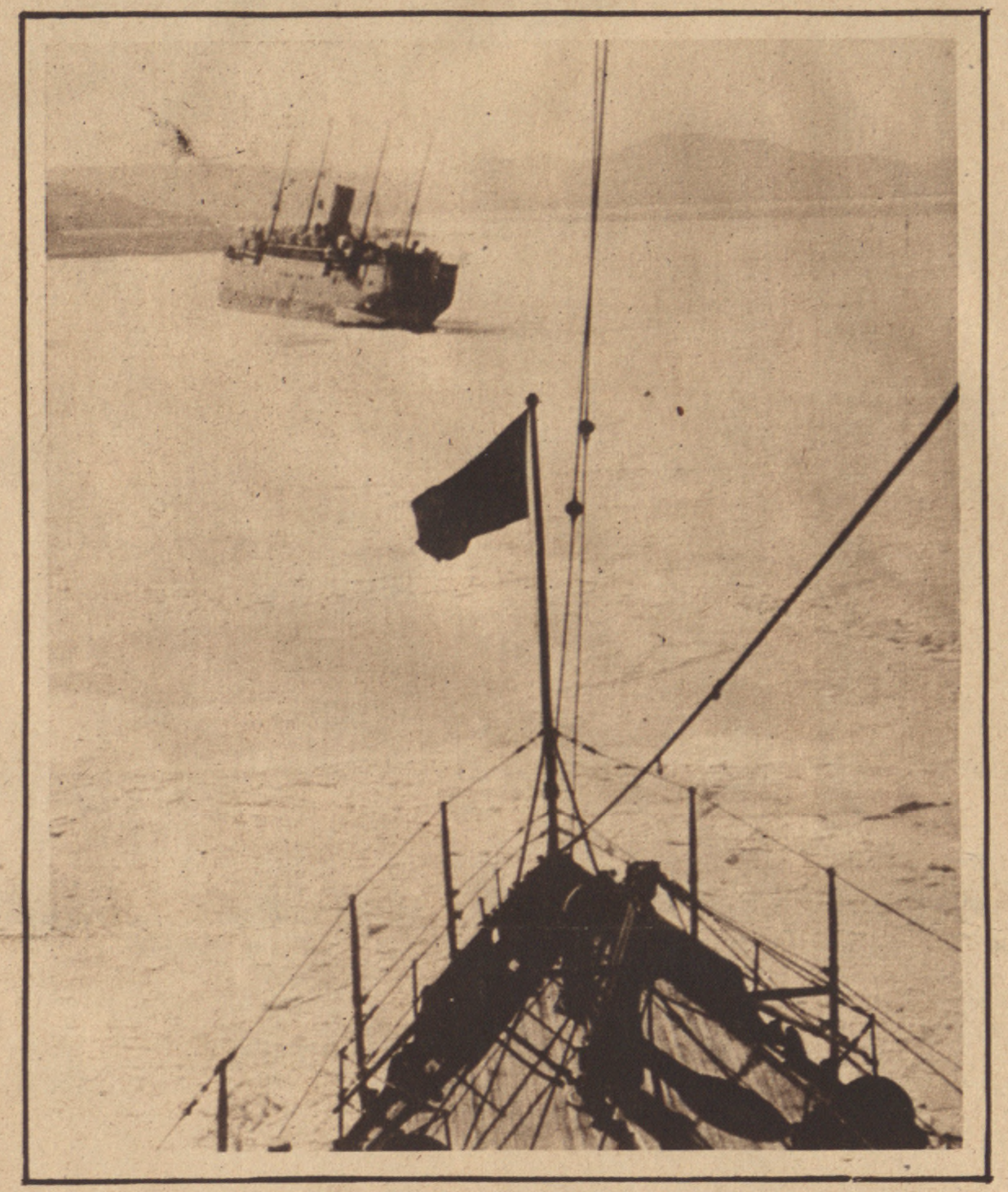
Sheridan in the ice-filled harbor at Vladivostok. She is listing due to shifting of her cargo. The photo was taken from the bow of USS Brooklyn.

The revolutionary Bolshevik government of Russia made a separate peace with the Central Powers in March 1918, ending Russian participation in World War I. Sheridan's first trip to Siberia evacuated Maria Bochkareva, who led a Russian military unit fighting the Bolsheviks, from Vladivostok on 18 April 1918.

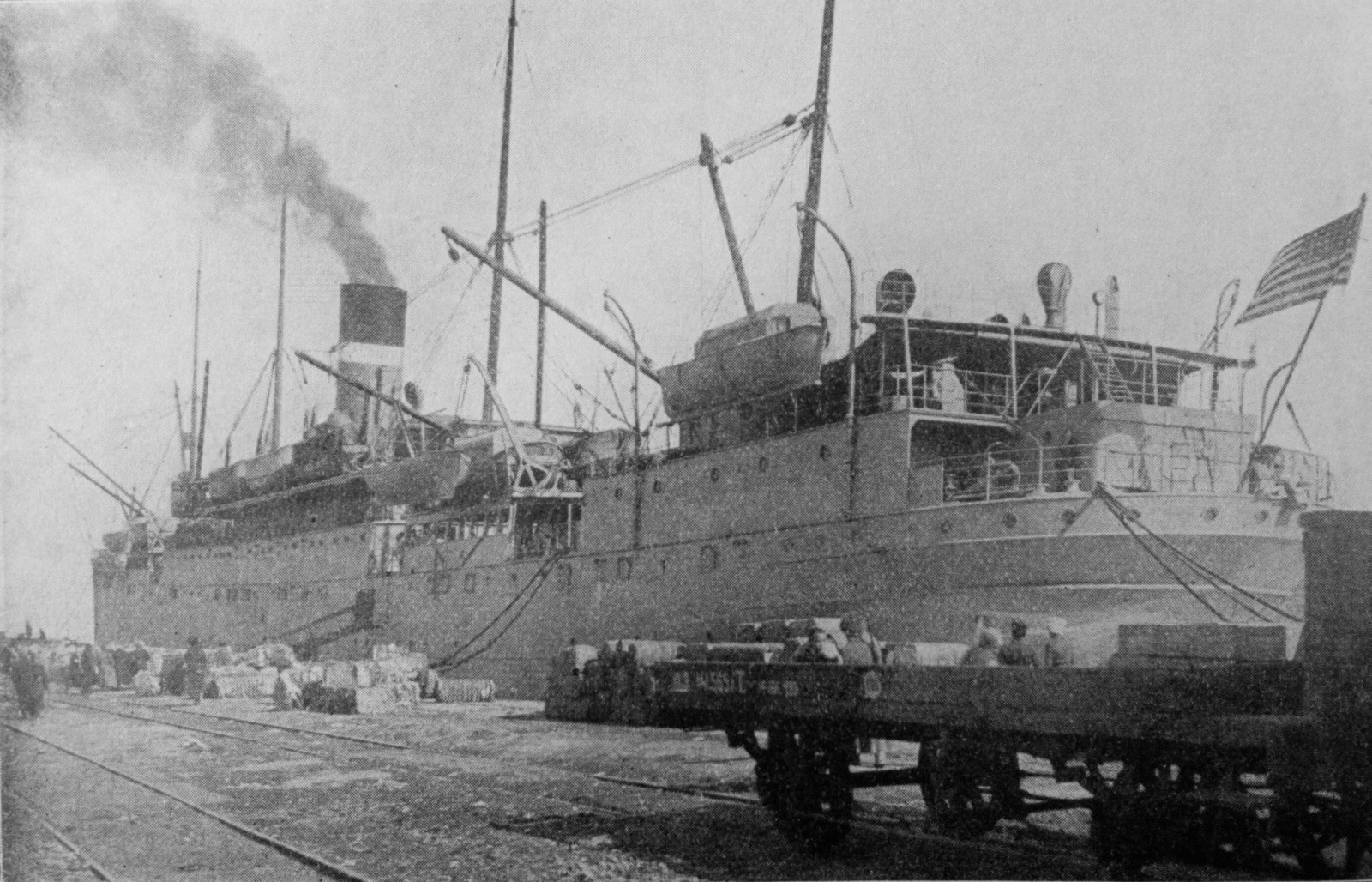
Sheridan in Vladivostok in 1920

In July 1918, President Wilson sent U.S. troops to Siberia as part of an Allied Expeditionary Force to safeguard American interests threatened by Russia's withdrawal from the war. Sheridan and sister-ship USAT Logan reached Vladivostok on 29 September 1918. They disembarked 3,682 troops, which brought the previously landed 27th and 31st Infantry Regiments to full strength. Sheridan also brought to Siberia 600 cases of Russian ruble notes printed by the American Bank Note Company at the request of provisional government. United States authorities refused to hand over the cash to local officials for fear of destabilizing the local economy. Sheridan carried the money back to Manila, leaving bad feelings amongst the Russians.

During 1919 Sheridan sailed a triangular route between San Francisco, Vladivostok, and Manila, with her usual intermediate stops in Hawaii, and Guam. While in 1918, the ship brought troops to Vladivostok, by late 1919 she was bringing them home. She arrived in San Francisco on 7 December 1919 with 1,700 men of the expeditionary force.

Sheridan's final trip for the Army was a round trip from San Francisco to Honolulu and back in March 1921.

== Obsolescence, sale, and scrapping ==
In December 1920, the War Department announced its intention to sell eight Army transports, including Sheridan and two of her sister ships purchased from the Atlantic Transport Line in 1898. Given the glut of more modern troopships built during World War I, it made little sense for the Army to maintain the thirty-year-old Sheridan. Bids on the ship were opened in October 1921 and found insufficient. On 21 December 1922, a second round of bidding for Sheridan brought two offers, $20,250, and $16,250. The ship was sold to the high bidder, the Union Construction Company of Oakland in January 1923. The company announced its intention to either resell the ship or scrap her. She was reported in the process of being scrapped in August 1923.
