= USAT Sherman =

U.S. Army troopship

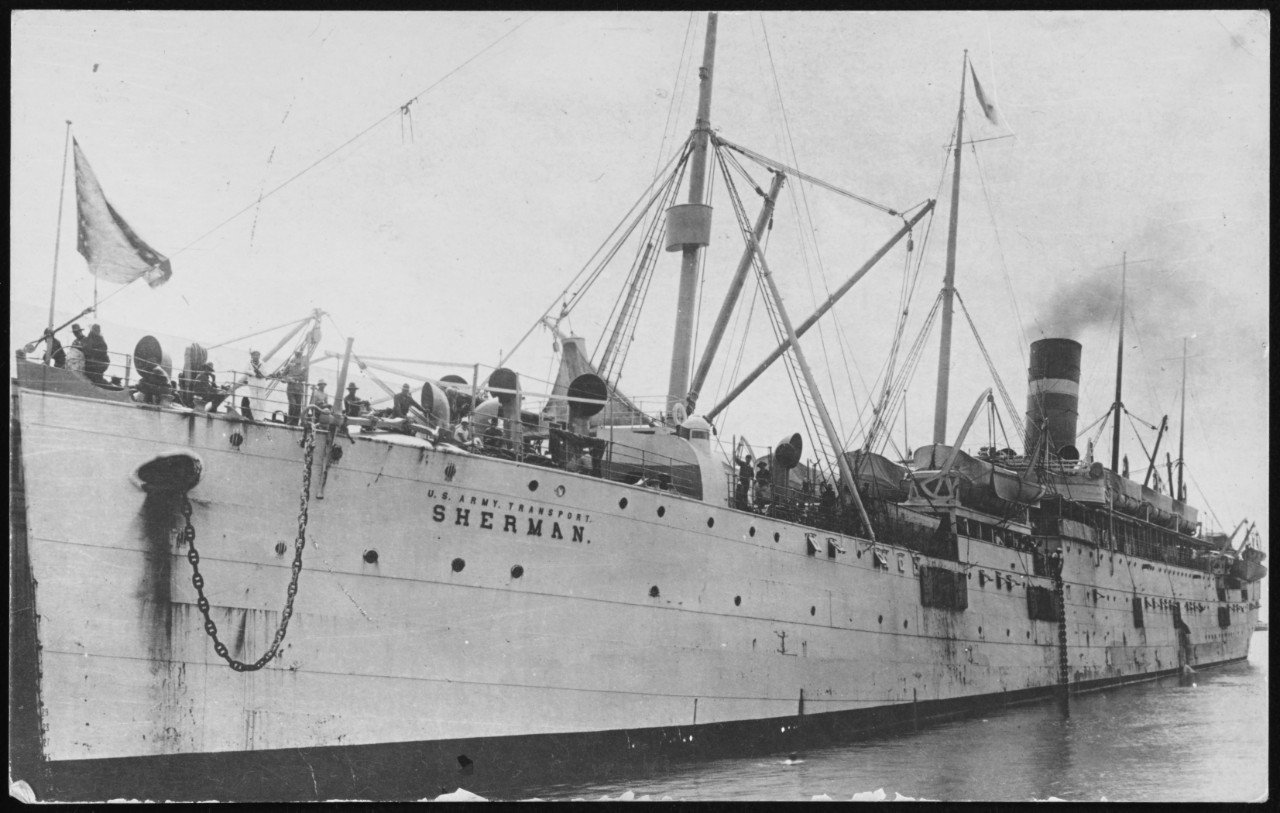
- USAT Sherman

History

United Kingdom
- Name: Mobile (1892-1898)
- Operator: Atlantic Transport Line
- Builder: Harland & Wolff, Belfast
- Launched: 17 November 1892
- Home port: London, England
- Identification: Official number 101966
- Fate: Sold for $660,000

United States
- Name: Mobile (1898-1899); Sherman (1899-1922)
- Operator: Army Transport Service
- Home port: San Francisco, California
- Identification: Radio call sign: ATR (1907); WXK (1913)
- Fate: Sold for $20,250

United States
- Name: Calawaii (1922-1933)
- Operator: Los Angeles Steamship Company
- Identification: Official number 222730; Radio Call Sign MDWL
- Fate: Sold and scrapped in 1933

General characteristics
- Tonnage: 5,283 Gross registered tons; 3,725 Net registered tons
- Displacement: 7,271 tons
- Length: 445.5 ft (135.8 m)
- Beam: 49 ft 3 in (15.01 m)
- Draft: 24 ft (7.3 m)
- Depth of hold: 30 ft (9.1 m)
- Decks: 5
- Installed power: 1,200 horsepower
- Propulsion: 2 x triple-expansion steam engines
- Speed: 13.5 knots

The steamship Mobile was steel-hulled freighter built for the Atlantic Transport Line in 1891. She carried live cattle and frozen beef from the United States to England until the advent of the Spanish-American War. In 1898 she was purchased by the United States Army for use as an ocean-going troopship. During the Spanish-American War she carried troops and supplies between the U.S. mainland, Cuba, and Puerto Rico.

After the war, she was renamed USAT Sherman and was fitted for service in the Pacific, supporting U.S. bases in Hawaii, Guam, and the Philippines. In addition to her regular supply missions, she transported American troops to several conflicts in the Pacific, including the Philippine Insurrection, Boxer Rebellion, the 1911 Revolution in China, and the Siberian Intervention of World War I. Her last sailing in government service was in June 1922.

The ship was sold to the Los Angeles Steamship Company which renamed her Calawaii. She ran freight and passengers between Los Angeles and Hawaii from 1923 to 1932. The ship was scrapped in Japan in 1933.

== Construction and characteristics ==
The Atlantic Transport Line commissioned four sisterships to be built by the Harland and Wolff Shipyard in Belfast, Northern Ireland. They were, in order of launch, Massachusetts, Manitoba, Mohawk, and Mobile.

Mobile's hull was built of steel plates. She was 445.5 feet (135.8 m) long, with a beam of 49.2 feet (15.0 m) and a depth of hold of 30 feet (9.1 m). Her gross register tonnage was 5,283, and her net register tonnage was 3,725. She displaced 7,271 tons.

She was driven by two manganese-bronze propellers. These were turned by two triple-expansion steam engines which were also built by Harland and Wolff. They had high, medium, and low-pressure cylinders with diameters of 22.5 inches, 36.5 inches, and 60 inches, respectively, with a stroke of 48 inches. Each of the engines was rated at 600 horsepower. Steam was provided by two coal-fired boilers. At full speed she would burn 60 tons of coal per day.

Mobile's cargo capacity was built primarily to support the shipment of American beef to England, both in the form of live cattle and refrigerated dressed beef. She was fitted out to transport 1,000 live cattle, and could carry 1,000 tons of fresh meat in her refrigerated holds. She was also fitted with a salon and first-class cabins for 60 passengers.

Mobile was launched from the Harland and Wolff shipyard on Queen's Island on 17 November 1892. She then had her engines and boilers installed. The ship was completed on 27 July 1893.

== Atlantic Transport Line Service (1892–1898) ==
While the Atlantic Transport Line was controlled by American shipping magnate Bernard N. Baker, its operations were run from Britain. Mobile's home port was London and she was registered as a British ship. During her six-year career with Atlantic Transport Line she was assigned to the New York to London route. Mobile completed her maiden voyage to New York on 6 August 1893.

Mobile regularly shipped cattle to Britain, as she was designed to do. Since facilities for transporting cattle also supported other livestock, Mobile occasionally shipped horses, and even deer across the Atlantic.

== US Army Service (1898–1922) ==
=== Spanish–American War service (1898–1899) ===
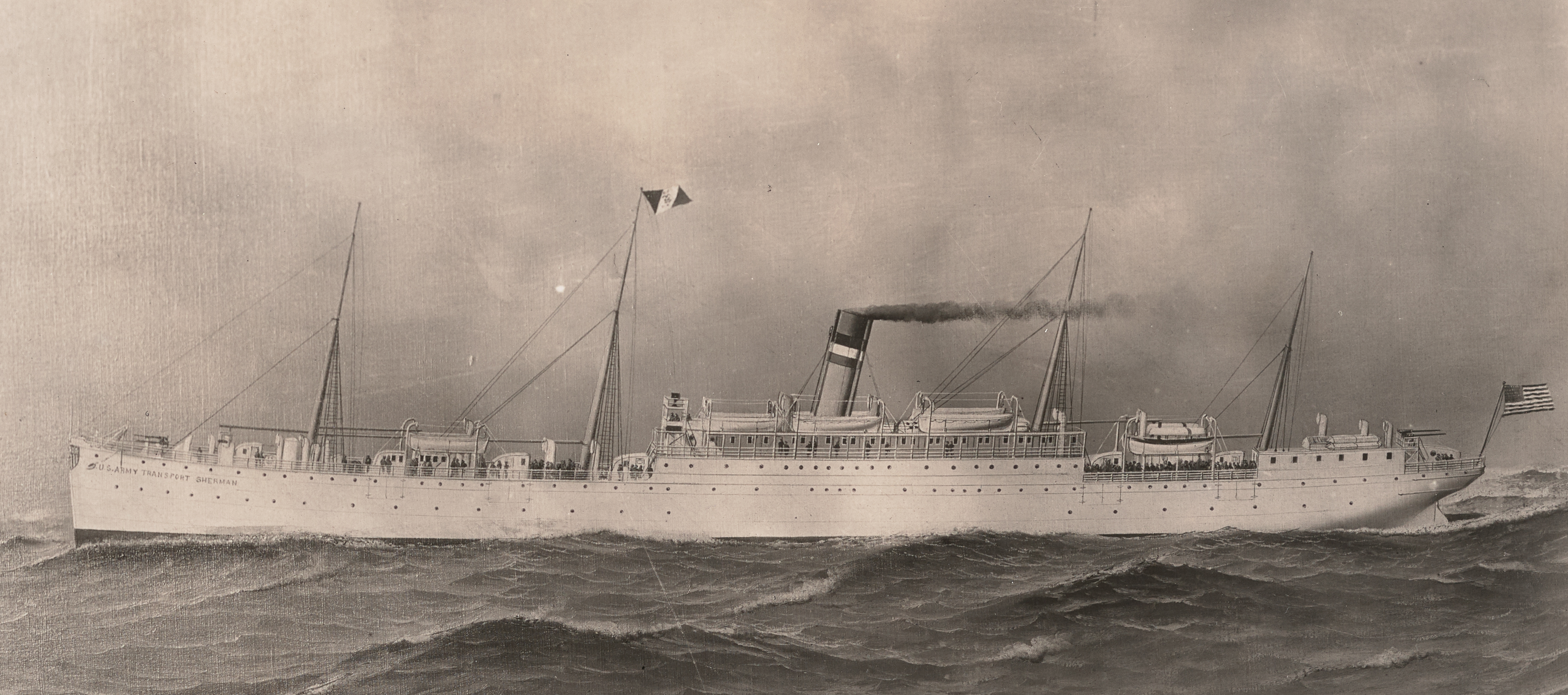
Sherman as she appeared in 1899

On 25 April 1898, Congress declared war on Spain, beginning the Spanish-American War. An immediate objective was to defeat Spain in the Caribbean, taking Cuba and Puerto Rico. At the time, the United States had few overseas possessions, and thus its military had limited ocean-capable sealift to support such an offensive. American political leaders preferred to acquire American ships to support the war effort, rather than enrich foreigners and rely on foreign crews. There were also legal constraints on using neutral-flagged vessels in American military operations. Through some quirks in the Congressional funding of the war, the US Navy was able to charter transport ships prior to the declaration of war and tied-up the best of the American merchant fleet for its use. When the Army was able to begin acquiring ships after the declaration of war, fewer domestic options remained. While the Atlantic Transport Line was British-flagged, it was American owned, making it a more attractive option.

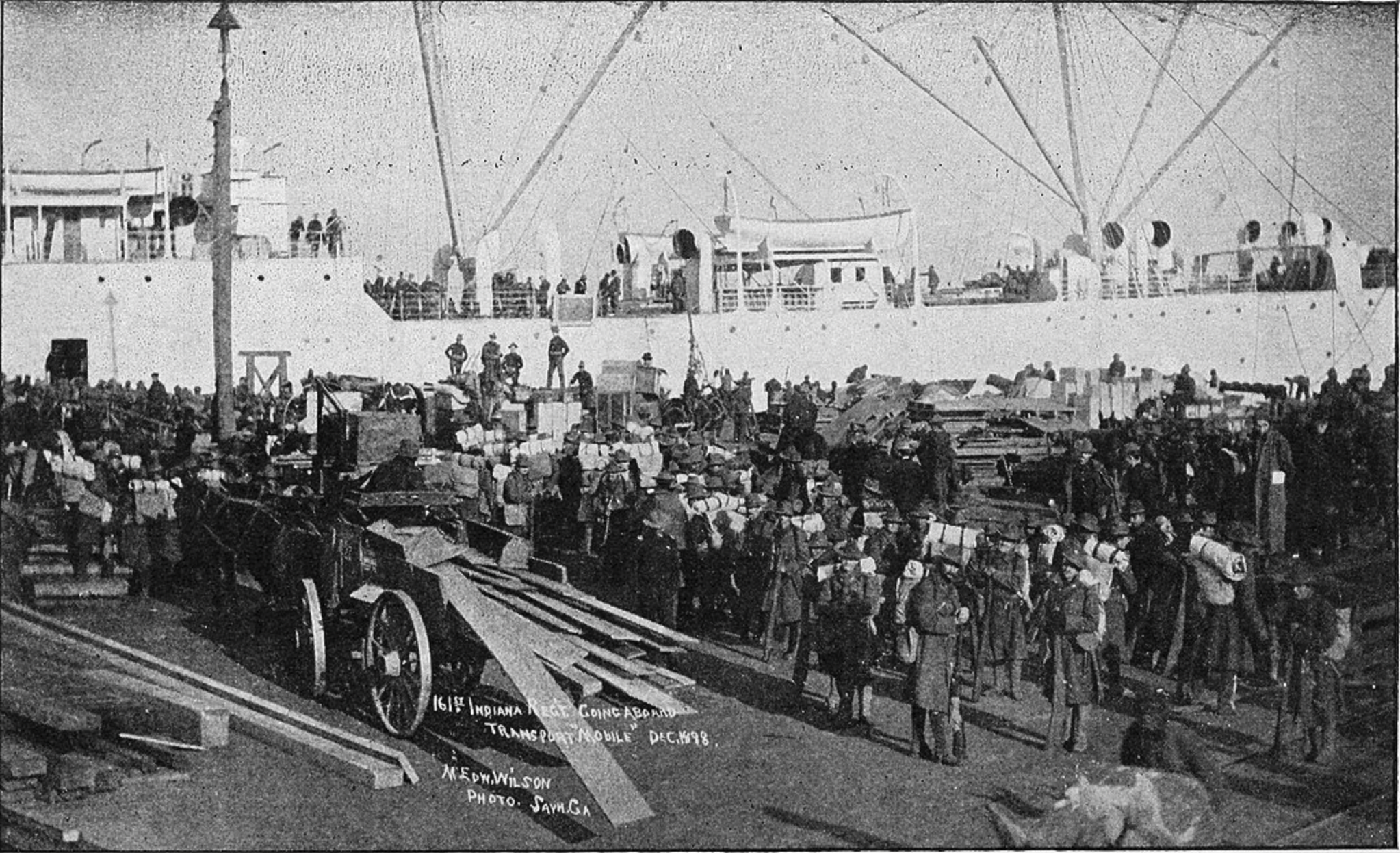
161st Indiana Infantry boarding Mobile in December 1898

Army Colonel Frank J. Hecker approached the Atlantic Transport Line to charter its fleet, and was refused. He then offered to buy the vessels he sought and a deal was struck, subject to the approval of the Secretary of War Russel Alger. In addition to Mobile, the Atlantic Transport Line sold Manitoba, Mohawk, Massachusetts, Michigan, Mississippi, and Minnewaska. These ships were placed under the Quartermaster's Department of the United States Army. The Army reckoned Mobile's capacity to be 80 officers, 1,000 men, and 1,000 horses. Mobile arrived in New York from London on her last trip for the Atlantic Transport Line on 5 July 1898. She was turned over to the Army as soon as she was unloaded. The purchase price of the ship was $660,000.

Mobile underwent little conversion for military use. She sailed from New York on 14 July 1898, just a week after her purchase, for Charleston, South Carolina, where she arrived on 18 July 1898. There she embarked troops for Puerto Rico, but by then the fighting was all but over. Hostilities ceased on 12 August 1898. Her return to the mainland after her first trip to the Caribbean was widely criticized in the press for significant overcrowding, spoiled food, and lack of care for the sick and wounded. Perhaps the bad press stung, for Mobile did not sail again until she was overhauled at the William Cramps and Sons shipyard in Philadelphia and personally inspected by Secretary of War Alger.

Even though the war was over, the Army faced substantial logistical challenges in the Caribbean. It had to garrison the new possessions, and return the men temporarily mobilized for the offensive. Mobile moved thousands of troops and animals to and from Cuba and Puerto Rico.

Mobile troop movements to and from the Caribbean
Departure	From	To	Arrival	Units embarked
20 July 1898	Charleston	Ponce		2 companies, 6th Illinois Volunteer Infantry Regiment 16th Pennsylvania Volunteer Infantry Regiment
13 August 1898	Santiago	Montauk, New York	18 August 1898	2nd Massachusetts Volunteer Infantry Regiment 8th Infantry Regiment 22nd Infantry Regiment
13 December 1898	Savannah	Havana	15 December 1898	161st Indiana Volunteer Infantry Regiment 3rd battalion, 2nd Illinois Volunteer Infantry Regiment 1 company, 4th Virginia Volunteer Infantry Regiment
25 December 1898	Savannah	Havana	28 December 1898	2 battalions, 1st Texas Volunteer Infantry Regiment 2nd Louisiana Volunteer Infantry Regiment
3 January 1899	Savannah	Havana	6 January 1899	4th Illinois Volunteer Infantry Regiment 9th Illinois Volunteer Infantry Regiment
7 January 1899	Havana	New York	11 January 1899	

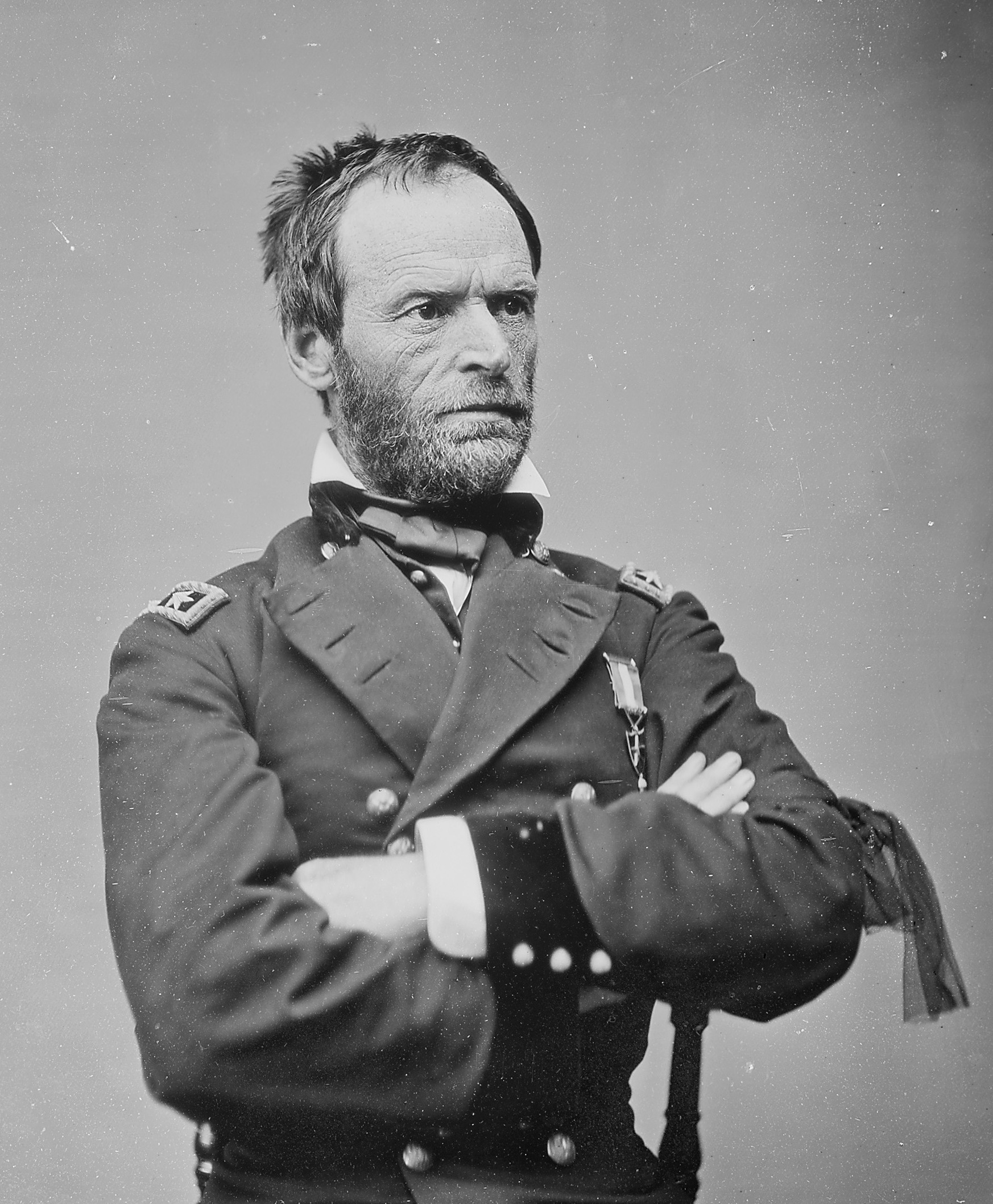
Sherman's namesake, General William Tecumseh Sherman

=== Preparation for Pacific service (1899) ===
Having taken Cuba, Puerto Rico, Guam, and the Philippines, the Army had a permanent need for transport to overseas bases. The annexation of Hawaii in 1898 also required new ocean transport. The Army Transport Service chose the best vessels acquired during the war to become a permanent sealift capability. Mobile and her three sister ships were retained for this purpose. To mark their transition to permanent military service, they were renamed in January 1899. Mobile became United States Army Transport Sherman, named for Civil War General William Tecumseh Sherman.

On 3 February 1899, Sherman sailed from New York, bound for Manila, via the Suez Canal. She had a full load of 34 officers and 1,702 men, including the 3rd Infantry Regiment and the 2nd battalion of the 17th Infantry Regiment. She stopped at Gibralter for coal on 15 February 1899. Sherman reached Port Said on 24 February 1899, Aden by 2 March, Singapore on 16 March, and finally arrived in Manila on 22 March 1899.

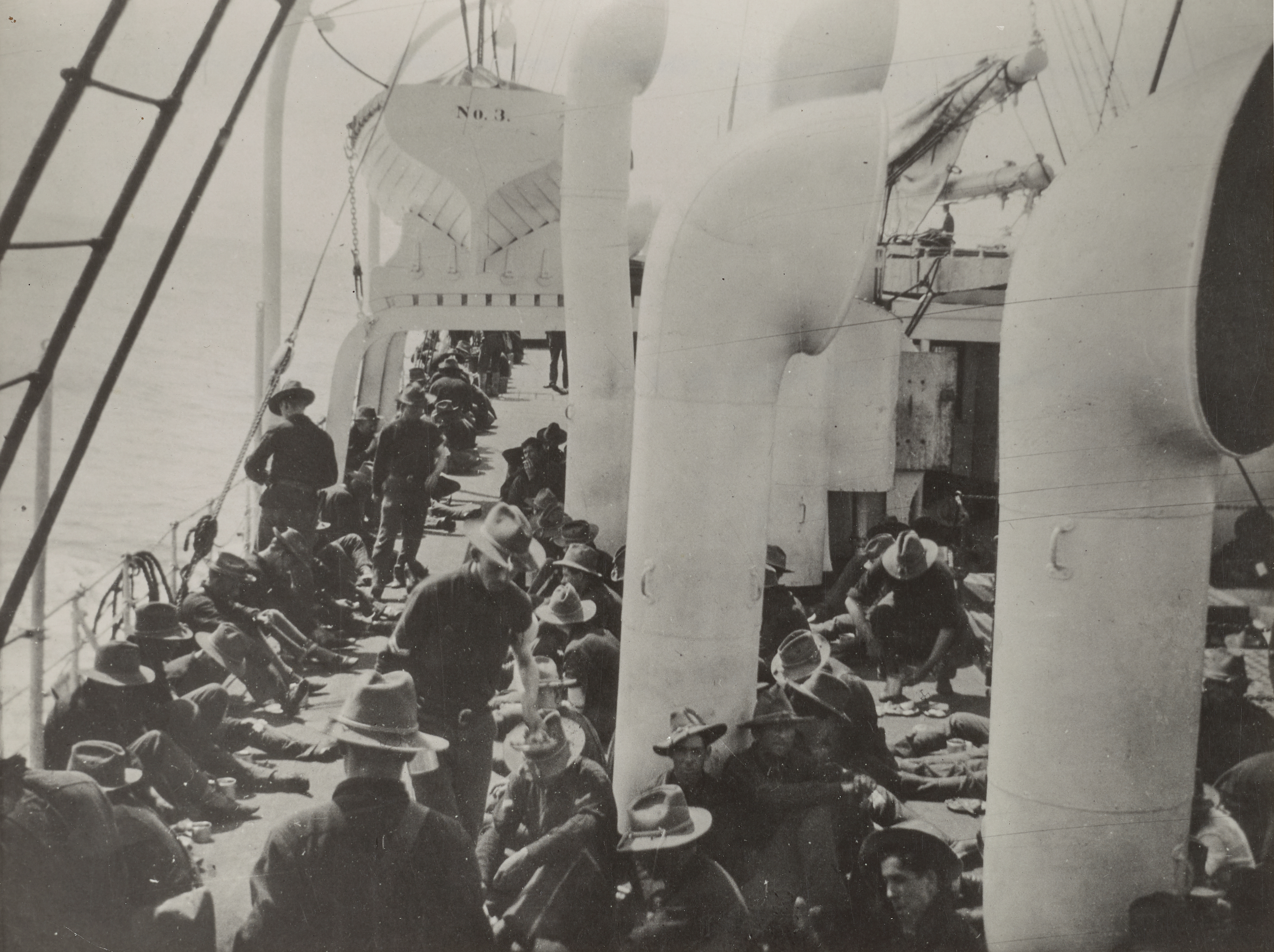
Mealtime for 30th Infantry troops aboard Sherman in 1899

After disembarking her troops and unloading her cargo in Manila, she sailed to San Francisco on 3 April 1899. Sherman carried about 100 wounded soldiers and Brigadier General Harrison Gray Otis, who had commanded a brigade of Army troops against the insurgent Philippine forces. She arrived at her new home port, via coaling stops at Nagasaki and Yokohama, on 29 April 1899.

As originally configured for her Pacific service, Sherman's capacity was 69 officers, 1,750 men, and 2,400 tons of cargo. After her shipyard modifications in 1901, her capacity was reckoned at 112 officers, 1,776 men, and 1,810 tons of cargo. Her authorized complement was 13 officers and 172 crew. As she sailed, her crew was typically between 175 and 200 officers and men. Just over 30 of the crew were waiters who were typically tipped by the first-class cabin passengers.

=== Philippine Insurrection and Boxer Rebellion (1899–1900) ===
There was an urgent need for troops and supplies in the Philippines to prosecute American aims in the Philippine-American War. Sherman sailed continuously during the critical portion of the conflict to deliver troops and supplies to Manila. Adding urgency to moving troops and supplies to Asia was the United States involvement in the Boxer Rebellion in China in 1900. Details of Sherman's trans-Pacific trips during this period are shown in the table below.

Sherman's trans-Pacific trips 1899-1900
Departure	From	To	Arrival	Units Embarked
23 May 1899	San Francisco	Manila	19 June 1899	6th Infantry Regiment
26 July 1899	Manila	San Francisco	24 August 1899	1st California Volunteer Infantry Regiment (48 officers, 950 men) 2 batteries, California Heavy Artillery (9 officers, 286 men) 275 discharged troops
23 September 1899	San Francisco	Manila	22 October 1899	30th Infantry Regiment 350 recruits for other regiments
4 November 1899	Manila	San Francisco	25 November 1899	194 discharged and sick troops
6 December 1899	San Francisco	Manila	2 January 1900	3rd Battalion, 49th Volunteer Infantry Regiment 160 recruits
	Manila	San Francisco	7 February 1900	86 sick troops
18 February 1900	San Francisco	Manila	14 March 1900	352 troops of various units
1 April 1900	Manila	San Francisco	26 April 1900	1 battalion, 14th Infantry Regiment
1 June 1900	San Francisco	Manila	28 June 1900	500 recruits
16 July 1900	Manila	San Francisco	6 August 1900	180 discharged and sick troops
21 August 1900	San Francisco	Manila		2nd Battalion, 22nd Infantry Regiment 1 battalion, 5th Infantry Regiment 1 battalion, 8th Infantry Regiment
23 September 1900	Manila	San Francisco	18 October 1900	51dead, 477 sick, 294 discharged troops 71 prisoners
1 November 1900	San Francisco	Manila	29 November 1900	292 officers and troops, 64 civilians 4,000 tons of supplies

=== Pacific service (1901–1918) ===
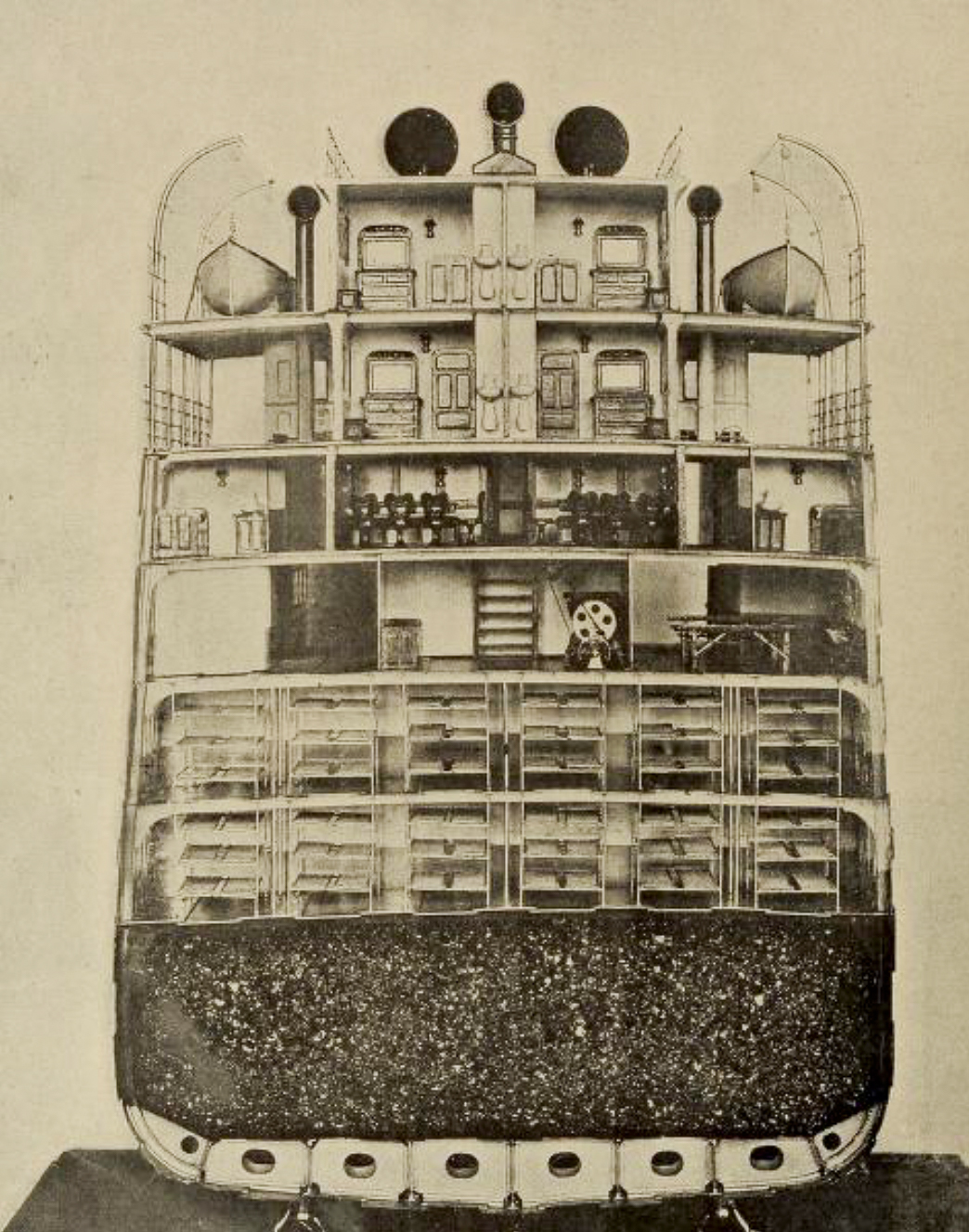
Cross-section model of Sherman. The lowest part of the ship is her coal bunkers. The two decks above have three-tiered cots for the troops. The top two decks have the first-class cabins.

On 7 January 1901 Sherman was taken out of commission for maintenance. An initial contract for $335,497.50 was signed with the Union Iron Works shipyard in San Francisco, and a $33,244 contract for additional work was added later. Work on the ship stopped when the machinists' union struck in May 1901. She languished in port, but when the strike was settled, her decks were rebuilt, the number of staterooms was increased, her medical facilities were improved, lavoratories expanded, and a new ice house was built . Her first sailing after the overhaul left from San Francisco in April 1902.

Sherman began a regular shuttle service between San Francisco, Honolulu, Guam, and Manila. The Army Transport Service maintained a roughly monthly schedule of sailings from San Francisco using Sherman, USAT Logan, USAT Sheridan, and USAT Thomas. The ships carried supplies, cash, mail, and fresh troops to the Philippines, and relieved, discharged, wounded, and dead troops back to the United States. During fiscal year 1903, for example, Sherman made three round trips through the Pacific. On her departures from San Francisco Sherman carried a total of 185 officers, 3,021 soldiers, and 244 civilians, many of them family members of the officers. On her return voyages she had aboard 182 officers, 3,093 soldiers, and 347 civilians. In addition to Army personnel, the ship also routinely transported U.S. Marines Corps, and U.S. Navy personnel.

The first-class service offered to Sherman's cabin passengers attracted a number of prominent passengers. These included U.S. Senators Samuel Piles, and John Shafroth, U.S. Representatives F. A. Britton, George Edmunds, and Clement Brumbaugh, Major Generals John Brooke, John Weston, Lloyd Wheaton, George Randall, Frederick Funston, and Thomas Barry, and Brigadier Generals John J. Pershing, William Carter, Charles Humphrey, John Wisser, Frederick Strong, and Henry Hodges.

In December 1902 Sherman struck a rock in San Bernardino Strait which punched a hole in her port bow below the waterline. The ship took on water but the pumps were able to keep up with the leaks. She went to Hong Kong for repairs before resuming her regular sailings.

In May 1906 Sherman sailed to Seattle to take on food and forage for the troops in the Philippines. She had on board 2,862 tons of oats, 547 tons of hay, and 315 tons of other commissary supplies on 7 May 1906 when a fire broke out on the dock to which she was moored. Sherman's rigging caught fire, but she had enough steam to power her fire pumps and to slowly back away from the dock. Quick repairs were made at the Puget Sound Naval Shipyard and Sherman sailed for Manila on 17 May, albeit without about 1,000 tons of cargo which were lost in the fire.

The ship was idled in September 1908 for lack of funds for necessary repairs. On 22 June 1909, just before the new Federal government fiscal year began, a contract was signed with Union Iron Works for $314,000 of repairs. She resumed her regular route through the Pacific, running from San Francisco to Honolulu, Guam, Manila, Nagasaki, and back again, on 5 April 1910, after more than a year out of commission.

In July 1911, Sherman took part in an experiment that was reported as the U.S. Army's first use of wireless telephony at sea. The radio aboard the ship received a voice transmission from San Francisco when she was roughly 600 miles from shore. Sherman had nothing but her standard wireless telegraphy equipment on board, so she repeated the voice message back in morse code to prove that she had received it.

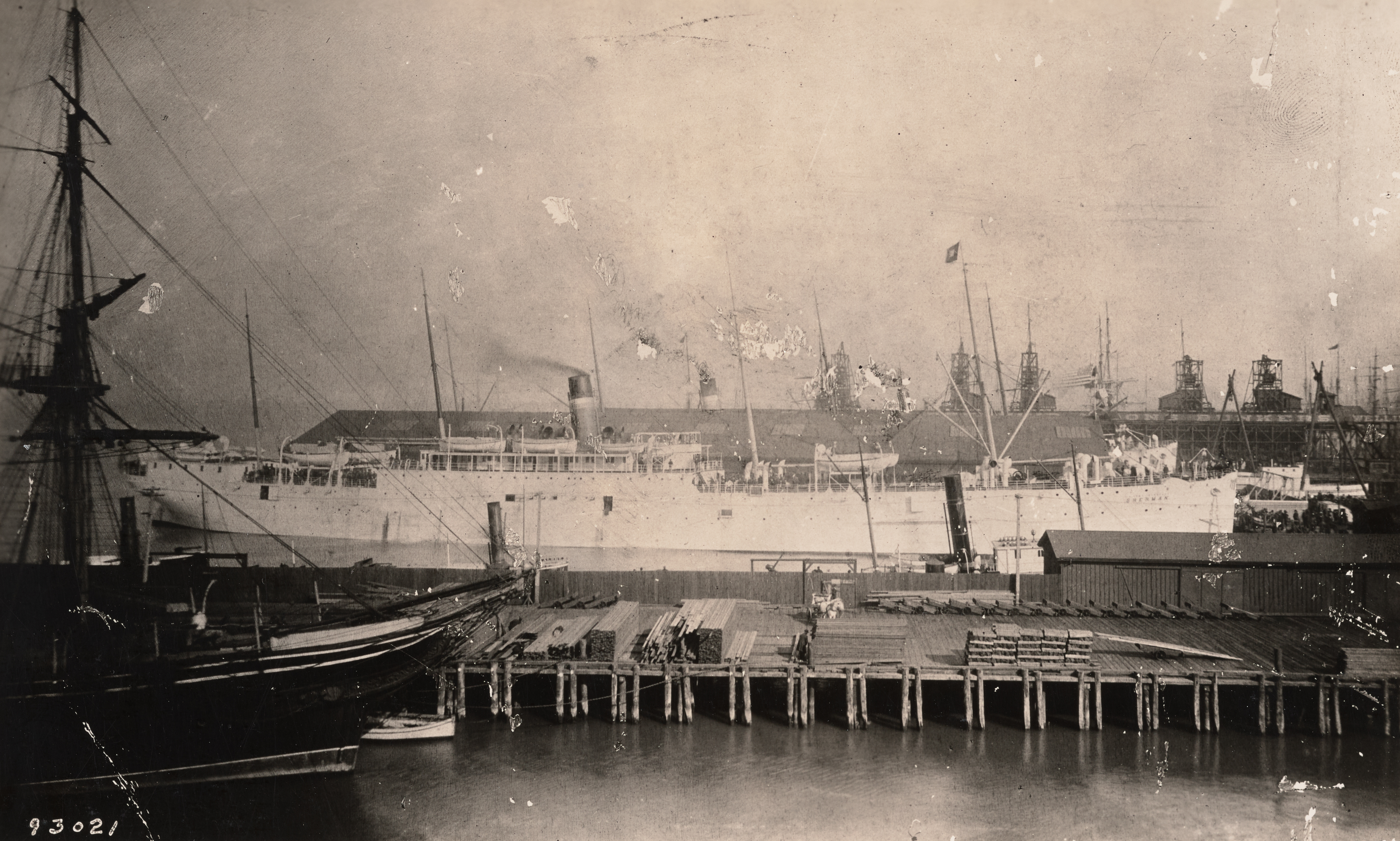
Sherman at the Army piers at Fort Mason in San Francisco

The Army Transport Service leased wharfage and warehouse space on the Folsom Street Pier in San Francisco and this is where Sherman most often moored when she was loading or unloading. In 1903, as the Army's commitments in the Pacific became clear, it decided to develop its own, larger facility at Fort Mason. Sherman was the first Army transport to dock at the new piers at Fort Mason when she arrived in San Francisco on 6 January 1912.

Sherman went out of commission for significant repairs in July 1914. She returned to her regular Pacific route in October 1914. In September 1918 the ship made a detour in her usual Pacific route by moving troops to and from Alaska. Sherman arrived at Fort Seward on 17 September 1918. She also stopped at Fort Liscum before returning to San Francisco.

=== Allied Expeditionary Force Siberia (1918–1920) ===
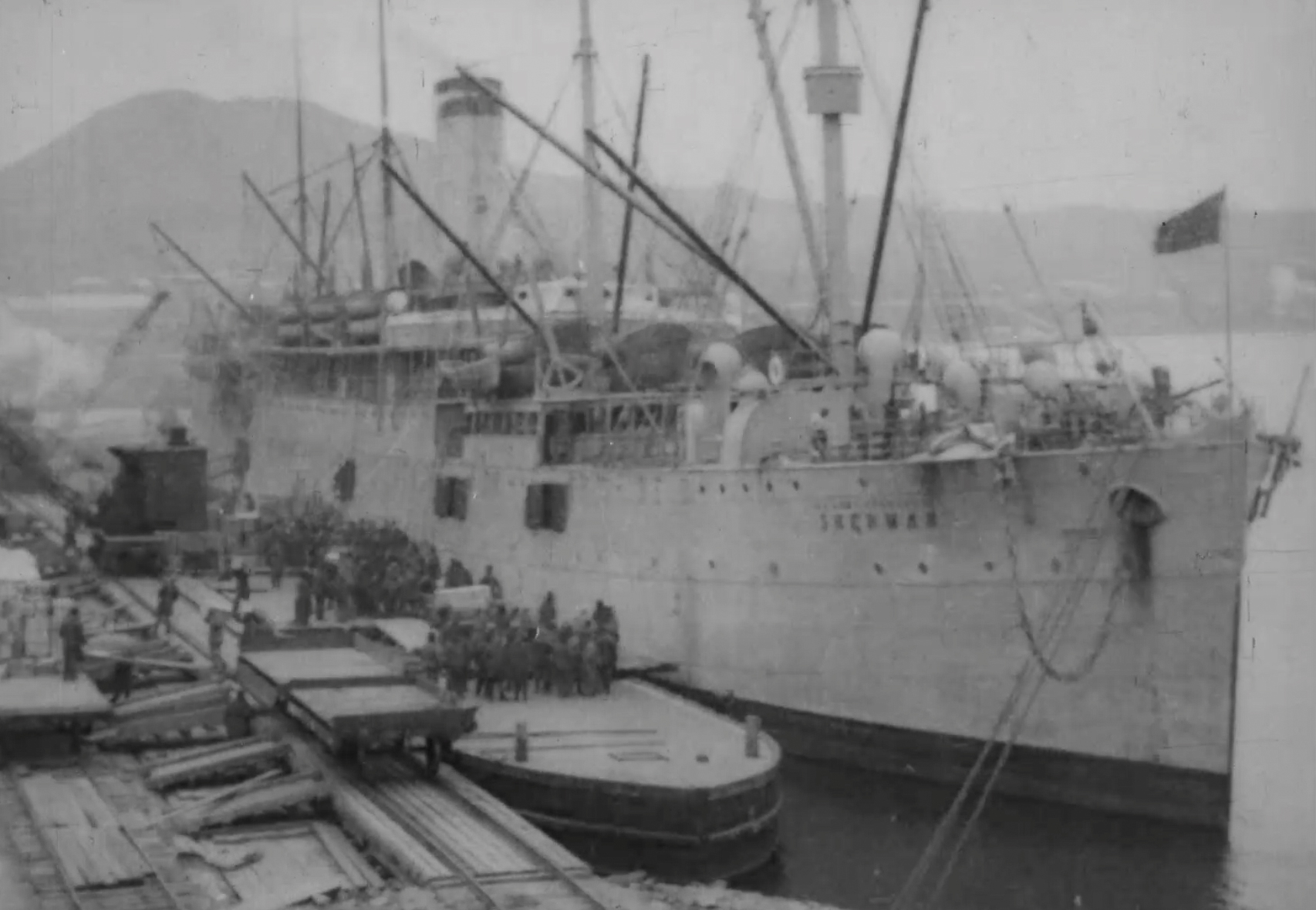
Sherman unloading at Vladivostok in November 1918

The revolutionary Bolshevik government of Russia made a separate peace with the Central Powers in March 1918, ending Russian participation in World War I. In July 1918, President Wilson agreed to send U.S. troops to Siberia as part of an Allied Expeditionary Force to safeguard American interests threatened by Russia's withdrawal from the war. Sherman embarked 45 officers and 1490 men, comprising most of the 31st Infantry Regiment, at Manila on 12 August 1918 and landed them in Vladivostok, Russia on 21 August.

During 1918 and 1919 Sherman sailed a triangular route between San Francisco, Vladivostok, and Manila, with her usual intermediate stops in Hawaii, and Guam. While in 1918, the ship brought troops to Vladivostok, by late 1919 she was bringing them home. Sherman sailed from Vladivostok for the last time on 24 June 1920 with 1,546 officers and men of the Czechoslovak Legion aboard. She arrived in Trieste, Italy, via the Suez Canal, on 7 July 1920 and disembarked the troops.

On her return trip from Europe, Sherman stopped at Brindisi, Gibraltar, and New York. The ship then made a single round trip to Antwerp, notable for carrying a part of the 1920 U.S. Olympic Team in both directions. On her return leg, Sherman repatriated the bodies of 763 American soldiers killed in Europe during World War I. From New York she passed through the Panama Canal and completed her round-the-world trip, arriving at San Francisco on 7 October 1920. After her circumnavigation she resumed her trans-Pacific shuttle service.

Sherman's final trip for the Army was a round trip to the Philippines. She arrived back at San Francisco on 6 June 1922.

== Los Angeles Steamship Company (1922–1933) ==
In December 1920, the War Department announced its intention to sell eight Army transports, including Sherman and two of her sister-ships purchased from the Atlantic Transport Line in 1898. Given the glut of more modern troopships built during World War I, it made little sense for the Army to maintain the thirty-year-old Sherman. Sealed bids for Sherman and several other transports were opened and accepted on 2 October 1922. Sherman was sold to the Los Angeles Steamship Company, which intended to sail her between Los Angeles and Honolulu. She replaced the company's City of Honolulu, which burned at sea.

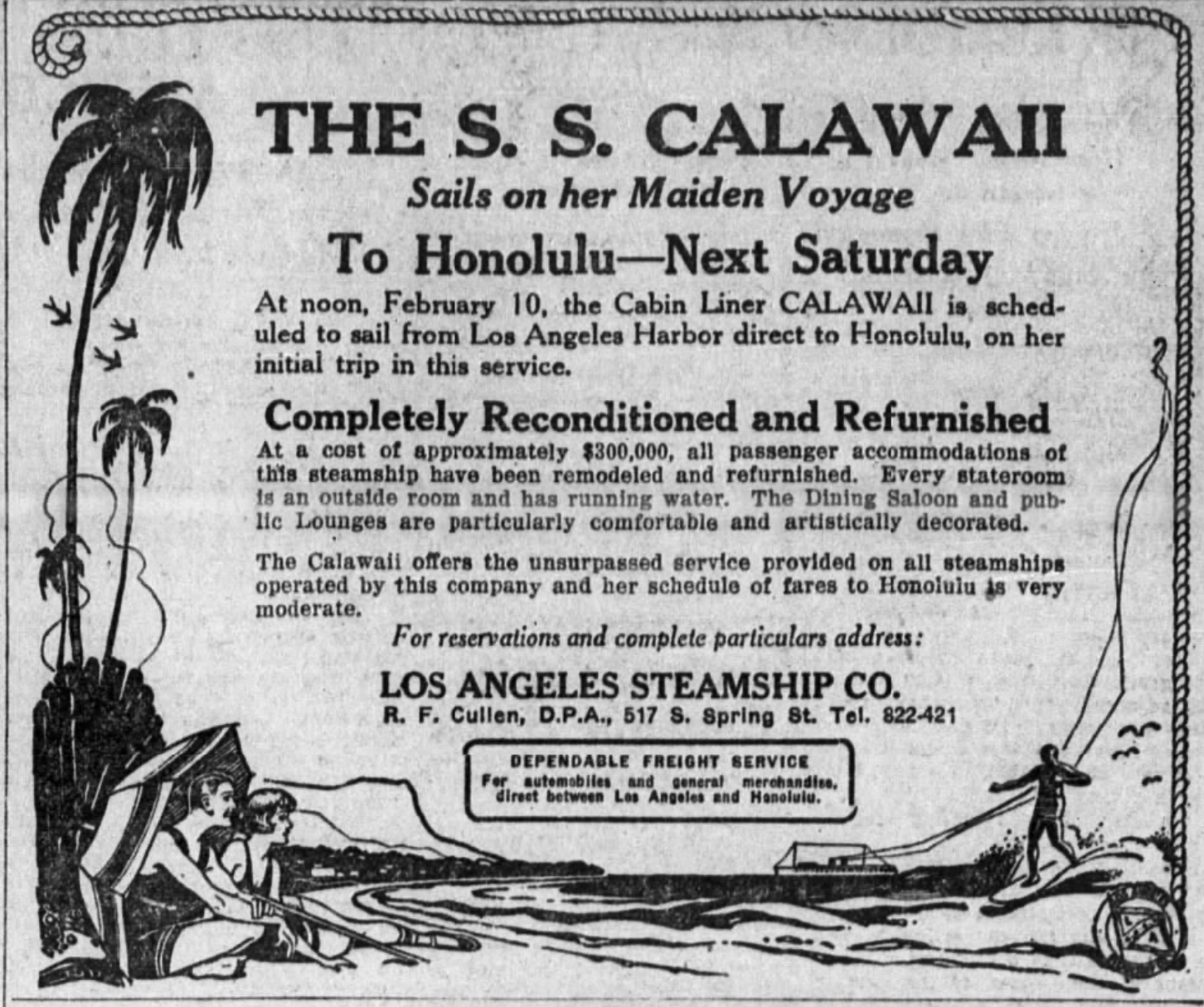
Ad for Calawaii's maiden voyage to Hawaii in 1923

The Los Angeles Steamship Company was reported to have spent $250,000 to $300,000 refitting the ship for her new service. The major work was done by the Los Angeles Shipbuilding and Drydock Company. Among the changes were to convert her boilers from burning coal to burning oil. Her name was changed to Calawaii, a contraction of California and Hawaii, the two endpoints of her route. The interiors of her staterooms and lounges were replaced as was her galley. New linens and china were procured.

Her top deck, the promenade deck, contained 23 staterooms, the doctor's office, music room, and smoking room. Her second deck contained 51 staterooms, the beauty salon, dining salon, and barber shop. Her third deck, the main deck, contained another first-class dining salon, and five 4-person third-class staterooms with an attached dining area. Her fourth deck contained another 14 staterooms and a lounge. She sailed with as many as 418 passengers. The passenger accommodations left plenty of room for freight, and Calawaii sailed with as much as 6,000 tons aboard. From Hawaii to the mainland, much of the freight was pineapples and bananas. From California to Hawaii freight ran the gamut from new cars for auto dealers, airplanes for the Navy, cement, asphalt, pipe, tile, grain, oranges, live quail, mail, and much more besides.

Calawaii's maiden voyage to Honolulu left Los Angeles on 10 February 1923. She averaged 13.8 knots en route. She returned to Los Angeles on 3 March 1923 with 125 passengers and a cargo of fresh and canned pineapples and bananas. The ship sailed one roundtrip per month, alternating with another company ship to provide sailings every two weeks in both directions. In 1926 the minimum one-way fare on Calawaii was $90.

In October 1929 the ship went into drydock to install new propellers which were intended to increase her speed. A new cafe on the promenade deck was added, and the smoking room was doubled in size at the same time.

In early 1932, some juggling of the company's transpacific schedule left Calawaii out of commission for four weeks. The location department of Warner Brothers took advantage of the gap in her sailings to charter the ship for six days of shooting for the movie One Way Passage, starring William Powell and Kay Francis.

The Los Angeles Steamship Company and Matson Navigation Company agreed to merge in October 1931. Both companies competed for passengers and freight between California and Hawaii, raising the possibility of cost cutting consolidation as the Great Depression deepened. In the immediate aftermath of the merger, Calawaii continued to sail for the Los Angeles Steamship Company, now a wholly owned subsidiary. In June 1932 Matson announced that two of the Los Angeles Steamship Company liners, including Calawaii, would be retired.

Calawaii was sold to Kishimoto Kisen Kaisha of Japan to be scrapped. She sailed from Los Angeles for the final time on 27 August 1933. She arrived in Osaka on 25 September 1933.
