= USED Chinook =

U.S. Army troopship and dredge

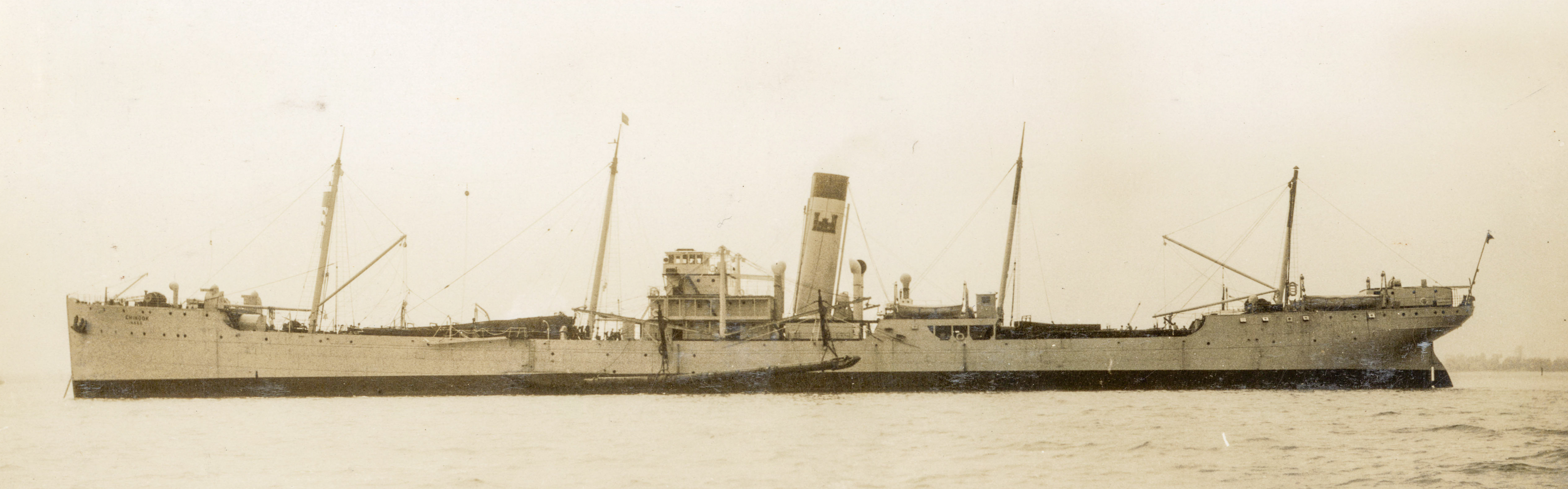
- USED Chinook in 1931

History

United Kingdom
- Name: Mohawk (1892–1898)
- Operator: Atlantic Transport Line
- Builder: Harland & Wolff, Belfast
- Launched: 25 February 1892
- Home port: London, England
- Identification: Official number 99066
- Fate: Sold for $660,000

United States
- Name: Mohawk (1898–1899); Grant (1899–1902)
- Operator: Army Transport Service
- Home port: San Francisco, California
- Fate: Transferred to Corps of Engineers

United States
- Name: Chinook (1903–1946)
- Operator: Army Corps of Engineers
- Identification: Call sign: WYBH
- Fate: Scrapped

General characteristics as built in 1892
- Tonnage: 5,658 GRT; 3,646 NRT
- Displacement: 7,519 tons
- Length: 445.5 ft (135.8 m)
- Beam: 49 ft 3 in (15.01 m)
- Draft: 24 ft (7.3 m)
- Depth of hold: 30 ft (9.1 m)
- Decks: 5
- Installed power: 1,200 hp (890 kW)
- Propulsion: 2 × triple-expansion steam engines
- Speed: 13.5 knots (25.0 km/h; 15.5 mph)

The steamship Mohawk was a steel-hulled freighter built for the Atlantic Transport Line in 1892. She carried live cattle and frozen beef from the United States to England until the advent of the Spanish–American War. In 1898, she was purchased by the United States Army for use as an ocean-going troopship. During the Spanish–American War, she carried troops and supplies between the U.S. mainland, Cuba, and Puerto Rico.

After the war, she was renamed USAT Grant and refit for service as a troopship in the Pacific. She carried troops and supplies to the Philippines and China to support the Army in the Philippine Insurrection and the Boxer Rebellion. Costly boiler repairs and the need to reduce the size of the Army Transport Service's Pacific fleet led to the ship's retirement as a troopship in 1902.

Grant was transferred to the United States Army Corps of Engineers and converted into a suction dredge in 1903. At that time she was the largest such dredge in the world and remained so until 1938. Grant was renamed USED Chinook. She was responsible for widening and deepening shipping channels on the Columbia, Delaware, and Mississippi rivers, Hampton Roads, Tampa Bay, New York Harbor, and other major ports and waterways. She was decommissioned in 1946 and subsequently scrapped.

== Construction and characteristics ==
The Atlantic Transport Line commissioned four sister ships to be built by the Harland & Wolff shipyard in Belfast, Ireland. They were, in order of launch, Massachusetts, Manitoba, Mohawk, and Mobile.

Mohawk's hull was built of steel plates. She was 445.5 feet (135.8 m) long, with a beam of 49.2 feet (15.0 m) and a depth of hold of 30 feet (9.1 m). Her gross register tonnage was 5,658, and her net register tonnage was 3,646.

She was driven by two propellers. These were turned by two triple-expansion steam engines which were also built by Harland & Wolff. They had high, medium, and low-pressure cylinders with diameters of 22.5 inches, 36.5 inches, and 60 inches, respectively, with a stroke of 48 inches. Each of the engines was rated at 600 horsepower (450 kW). Steam was provided by coal-fired boilers. At full speed, the ship would burn 60 tons of coal a day.

Mohawk's cargo capacity was built primarily to support the shipment of American beef to England, both in the form of live cattle and refrigerated dressed beef. She was fitted out to transport 1,000 live cattle, with a space of 8 feet (2.4 m) long by 2.5 feet (0.76 m) wide allocated to each animal. Her refrigerated holds could carry 1,000 tons of fresh meat. The ship also had accommodations for up to sixty cabin passengers.

Mohawk was launched from the Harland & Wolff shipyard on Queen's Island on 25 February 1892. Her engines and machinery were then installed and she was delivered to her new owners on 7 May 1892.

== Atlantic Transport Line (1892–1898) ==
While the Atlantic Transport Line was controlled by American shipping magnate Bernard N. Baker, its operations were run from Britain. Mohawk's home port was London and she was registered as a British ship. During her six-year career with Atlantic Transport Line, she was assigned to the New York to London route.

Mohawk proved exceptionally capable at moving cattle across the Atlantic. On her first crossing in 1892, she brought 489 cattle to England and only two died en route. Since horses could be shipped using the same facilities as cattle, Mohawk occasionally shipped them as well. In 1897, the hunter Long Shot was shipped to England as a gift to the Duchess of Marlborough from her mother. On the same trip, Mohawk carried 206 horses purchased for British cavalry use. Noted race horse enthusiast Pierre Lorillard shipped a dozen thoroughbreds to London on board. In 1892, Mohawk carried Buffalo Bill's Wild West Show from London back to America. Among the livestock that accompanied the show aboard were 18 buffalo, nine kicking broncos, and three of Cody's personal horses.

Mohawk was a speedy ship for her day. In August 1892, she reached New York From London in 9 days, 20 hours, the fastest passage to that time by a freighter. She beat the record of her sister ship, Manitoba.

Perhaps the most eventful day of Mohawk's career as a commercial vessel was 20 January 1897, when she saved the 17 surviving crew of the dismasted and sinking Norwegian bark Persia during a North Atlantic storm.

== Army Transport Service (1898–1902) ==
=== Spanish–American War (1898) ===
On 25 April 1898, Congress declared war on Spain, beginning the Spanish–American War. An immediate objective was to defeat Spain in the Caribbean, taking Cuba and Puerto Rico. At the time, the United States had few overseas possessions, and thus its military had limited ocean-capable sealift to support such an offensive. American political leaders preferred to acquire American ships to support the war effort, rather than enrich foreigners and rely on foreign crews. There were also legal constraints on using neutral-flagged vessels in American military operations. Through some quirks in the Congressional funding of the war, the United States Navy was able to charter transport ships prior to the declaration of war and tied-up the best of the American merchant fleet for its use. When the United States Army was able to begin acquiring ships after the declaration of war, fewer domestic options remained. While the Atlantic Transport Line was British-flagged, it was American owned, making it a more attractive option.

Army Colonel Frank J. Hecker approached the Atlantic Transport Line to charter its fleet, and was refused. He then offered to buy the vessels he sought and a deal was struck, subject to the approval of the Secretary of War Russell Alger. In addition to Mohawk, the Atlantic Transport Line sold Massachusetts, Manitoba, Mobile, Michigan, Mississippi, and Minnewaska. These ships were placed under the Quartermaster's Department of the United States Army. The Army reckoned Mohawk's capacity to be 80 officers, 1,000 men, and 1,000 horses. Mohawk was turned over to the Army in New York on 29 June 1898. The price of the ship was $660,000.

The Army immediately sent the ship into dry dock to have the marine growth scraped from her bottom. The British crew of 79 men refused to serve on a United States military ship. It was variously reported at the time that they were either replaced by Americans or agreed to serve with a 20 percent increase in their wages. However, she was crewed, the ship sailed from New York for Tampa on 5 July 1898, less than a week after the Army took possession. She carried approximately 600 mules, 200 horses, and 1,400 men from Tampa to Puerto Rico. By the time Mohawk reached the island on 2 August 1898, the fighting was all but over. Hostilities ceased on 12 August 1898.

Mohawk troop movements to and from the Caribbean
Departure	From	To	Arrival	Units embarked
24 July 1898	Tampa	Ponce	2 August 1898	ten companies 11th Infantry Regiment
18 August 1898	Santiago	Montauk, New York	24 August 1898	8th Ohio Volunteer Infantry Regiment

=== Pacific service (1898–1902) ===
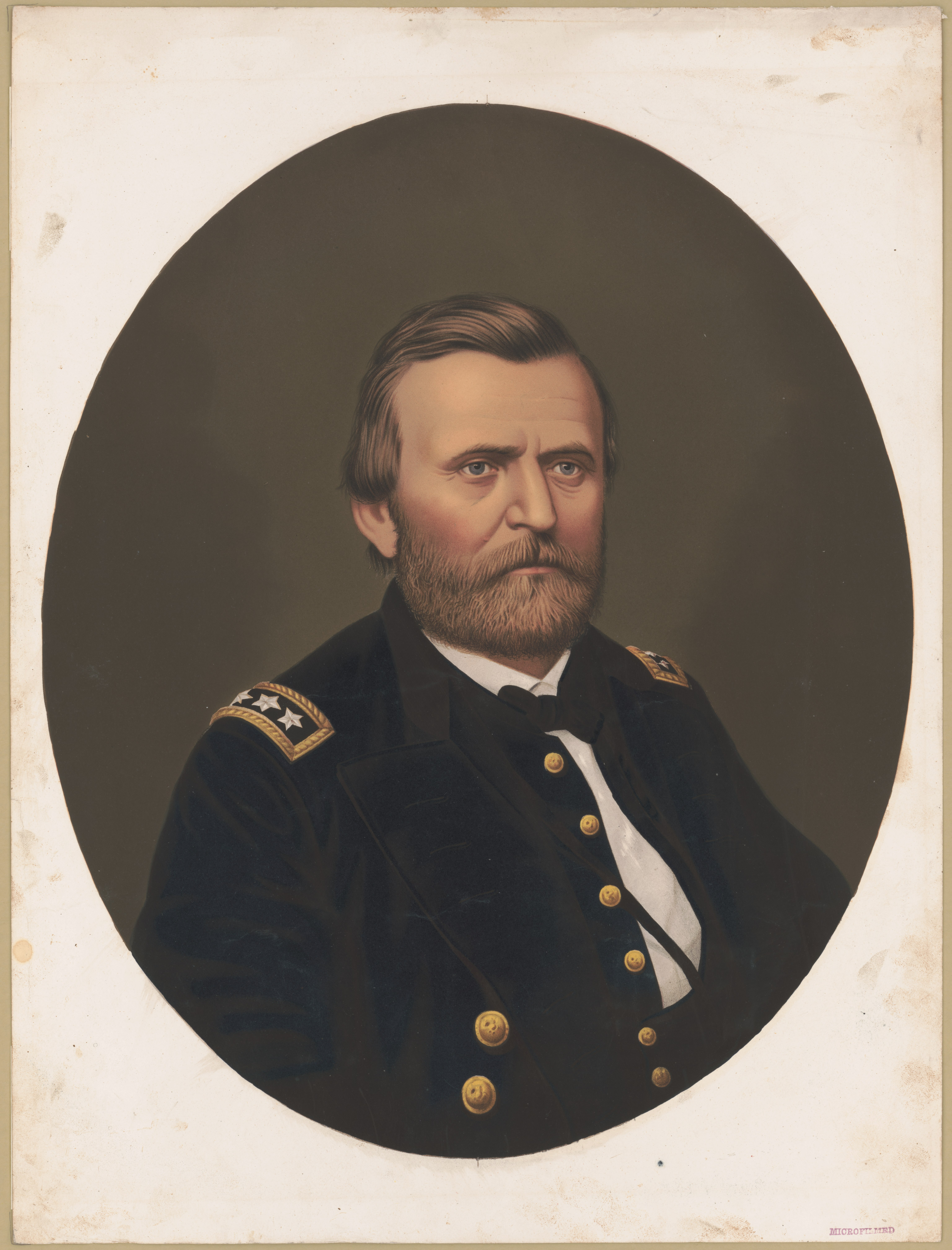
Ulysses S. Grant, Grant's namesake

Having taken Cuba, Puerto Rico, Guam, and the Philippines, the Army had a permanent need for transport to overseas bases. The annexation of Hawaii in 1898 also required new ocean transport. The Army Transport Service chose the best vessels acquired during the war to become a permanent sealift capability. Mohawk and her three sister ships were retained for this purpose. To mark their transition to permanent military service, they were renamed in January 1899 for prominent Civil War generals. Mohawk became United States Army Transport Grant, named for Ulysses S. Grant.

On 27 September 1898, the ship arrived at the Bath Iron Works in Bath, Maine for modifications to prepare her for transport service in the Pacific. The shipyard was the low bidder for the job at $82,800. During the work, the Army requested a number of extras which raised the ultimate cost to about $135,000. Among the projects accomplished at Bath were fitting two lower decks with three-tier pipe-berths which could accommodate 2,170 troops, and expanding the galley, messing, shower, toilet, ventilation, and other facilities to support the troops. Over 100 painters were employed to completely repaint the ship in lead white. A 50-bed hospital was installed. She sailed to New York, after her refit was complete, where she arrived on 4 January 1899.

Grant was assigned to deliver troops to the Philippines via the Suez Canal. In New York she embarked the 4th Infantry Regiment and one battalion of the 17th Infantry Regiment. Also aboard were Major General Henry Lawton and his staff. In total, there were 1,730 enlisted troops and about 150 officers and their families aboard. As Grant was the first major transport to leave New York for the Philippines, her departure was attended by a number of notable figures including Assistant Secretary of War Meiklejohn, Adjutant General Corbin, and Quartermaster General Ludington, U.S. Senators Proctor, Warren, and Mitchell, and seven U.S. Representatives, all members of the House Committee on Military Affairs.

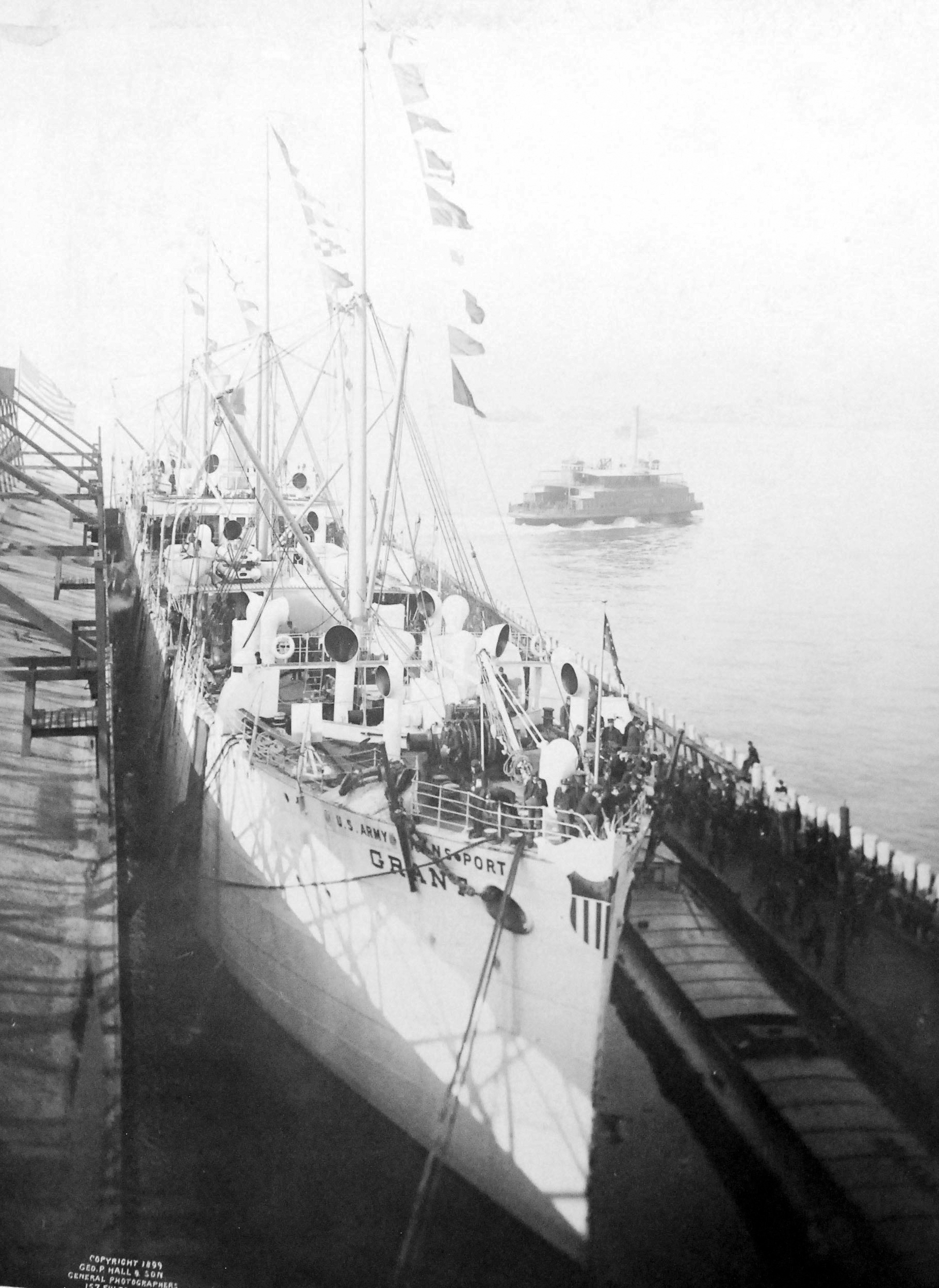
Grant in New York in January 1899 prior to sailing for the Philippines

As Grant backed out of her berth to begin her voyage on 17 January 1899, her starboard propeller fouled an old wire hawser. She was towed to her anchorage and divers were able to clear the old cable. On 18 January 1899, the ship sailed up the Hudson River to Grant's Tomb where a short ceremony was held to honor her namesake. The next day Grant sailed for Gibraltar, where she arrived on 1 February 1899. After taking on coal and water, Grant sailed on, arriving in Suez on 12 February 1899, Colombo on 26 February 1899, Singapore on 4 March 1899, and finally Manila on 10 March 1899.

Grant sailed from Manila on 25 March 1899 for San Francisco, via a coaling stop in Nagasaki. She had on board the bodies of a number of soldiers killed in the Philippines as well as sick and wounded. She arrived on 29 April 1899. As the Philippine Insurrection grew, so did the urgency to move more troops to the islands. Grant and other Army Transport Service ships began a shuttle from San Francisco to Manila. On most of her trips to Manila, Grant carried complete troop units, and a number of recruits and replacements for units already in the Philippines. On her return trips, she usually carried soldiers who were wounded, ill, or dead, prisoners, and those whose enlistment had expired. Depending on the size of her human cargo, she would also board supplies. On one trip, she carried almost 5,000 tons of supplies. The ship had a strong room and used it to carry cash to Manila to pay the Army's expenses. In October 1900, Grant sailed with $1.3 million aboard.

Among her cabin passengers were a number of notable figures. In July 1900, Grant sailed from San Francisco to Taku Bay, China with Major General Adna Chaffee, the commander of China Relief Expedition during the Boxer Rebellion. The civilian Governor of the Philippines, later U.S. President, William Howard Taft sailed home from Manila in December 1901 on Grant.

Grant full-unit troop movements in the Pacific
Departure	From	To	Arrival	Units Embarked
19 January 1899	New York	Manila	10 March 1899	4th Infantry Regiment 1 brigade, 17th Infantry Regiment
31 May 1899	San Francisco	Manila	27 June 1899	16th Infantry Regiment
31 July 1899	Manila	San Francisco	29 August 1899	Idaho Volunteer Infantry Regiment (481 men) North Dakota Volunteer Infantry Regiment (540 men) Wyoming Volunteer Infantry Regiment (274 men) Battery A, Wyoming Light Artillery (57 men)
25 September 1899	San Francisco	Manila	24 October 1899	26th Volunteer Infantry Regiment 250 recruits for other units
20 December 1899	San Francisco	Manila	25 January 1900	48th Volunteer Infantry Regiment
2 July 1900	San Francisco	Taku, China	29 July 1900	6th Cavalry Regiment 224 Marines
28 March 1901	Manila	San Francisco	19 April 1901	Company F, 26th Volunteer Infantry Regiment (79 men) 29th Volunteer Infantry Regiment (866 men) 32nd Volunteer Infantry Regiment (666 men)
1 June 1901	Manila	San Francisco	24 June 1901	48th Volunteer Infantry Regiment 49th Volunteer Infantry Regiment
25 August 1901	Manila	San Francisco	18 September 1901	Troop B, 4th Cavalry Regiment 12th Battery of Field Artillery 13th Battery of Field Artillery
15 November 1901	San Francisco	Manila	11 December 1901	28th Infantry Regiment (869 men)
26 March 1902	Manila	San Francisco	27 April 1902	12th Infantry Regiment

Grant received periodic safety inspections of her boilers throughout her service with the Army Transport Service. She failed her inspection in March 1902 and her next trip to Manila was cancelled. In May 1902, Grant's crew was discharged as it became clear that significant repairs could not be avoided. The low bid on the repair work was $358,000. The need for these costly repairs arose at the same time the Army was reducing its Pacific transport fleet as fighting in the Philippines and China decreased. The Army decided to retire Grant rather than pay for repairs, and offered the ship for sale in a sealed bid process. When the bids were opened in July 1902, the high bid for the ship was $51,000. The Army did not accept this bid.

In September 1902, Secretary of War Elihu Root announced that Grant would be transferred to the U.S. Navy. While the Army Transport Service was struggling with the cost of its Pacific fleet, the Army Corps of Engineers was struggling to dredge the mouth of the Columbia River. There was substantial Congressional support for deepening the Columbia, with $500,000 appropriated in 1902 and $1,000,000 in 1903. The Engineers developed a plan to convert Grant into a dredge to assist the project. They argued that a conversion would be much cheaper than building a new ship, and that the waters at the mouth of the Columbia were so rough that only a large ship like Grant could do the work. The Navy was convinced to relinquish its claim, and Grant was transferred to the Army Corps of Engineers in October 1902.

== Army Corps of Engineers (1903–1946) ==
Plans to convert Grant into a dredge were completed in November 1902. After a lengthy and contested bidding process, the contract for the conversion work was awarded to the Mare Island Naval Shipyard in February 1903. The work was completed in October 1903. The cost of the conversion was about $270,000. She was given a new name, United States Engineers Department Chinook. She was the largest dredge of her type in the world when completed, and remained so until 1938, when she was supplanted by USED Goethals.

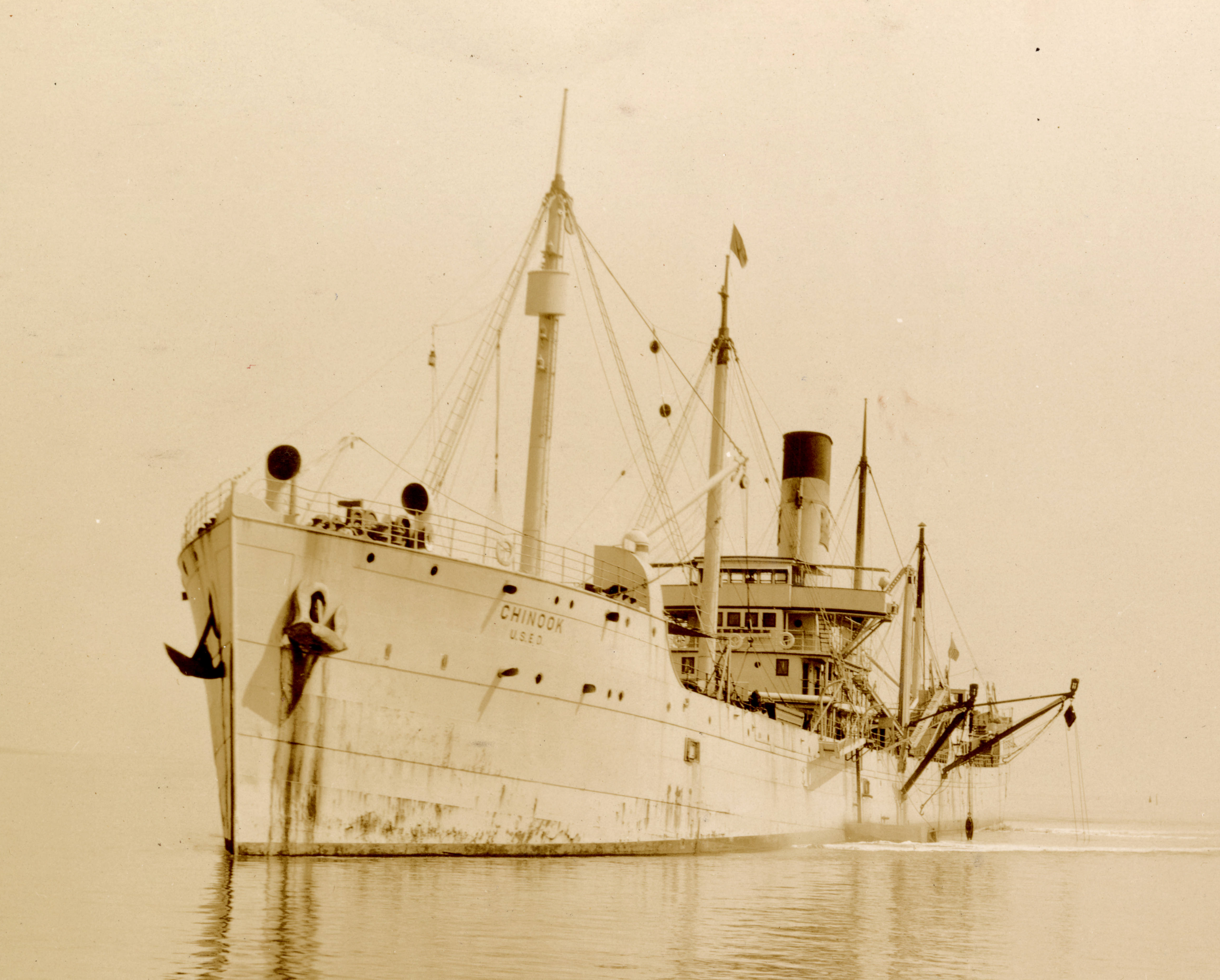
Chinook dredging the James River, Virginia in 1931

Chinook was a hopper dredge, or suction dredge. Much of her internal volume were two 40 feet (12 m)-deep hoppers, bins that could hold 4,050 cubic yards (3,100 m^{3}) of sand. Underneath the hoppers were 16 gates that could be opened to discharge the sand. On each side of the ship was a drag arm, a steel pipe, that could be lowered to the bottom. The pipe was 20 inches (0.51 m) in diameter. At the end of each drag arm was a drag shoe which was covered by a grate to keep large items from being sucked up the drag arm.

When Chinook was dredging, her drag arms were lowered to the bottom. Powerful pumps sucked sand and gravel up through the drag arms and dumped it into the hoppers. In 1903, the ship was fitted with two 20-inch (510 mm) centrifugal pumps that were capable of pumping 2,500 cubic yards (1,900 m^{3}) of sand per hour. Each pump was powered by its own triple-expansion steam engine with high, medium, and low-pressure cylinders of 13, 20, and 31 1/2 inches and a stroke of 20 inches. When the hoppers were full, Chinook would raise her drag arms, sail to a designated dumping ground, open the gates in the bottom of the hoppers, and let gravity discharge the dredging spoil into the water.

Chinook reached Astoria, Oregon, at the mouth of the Columbia, on 3 November 1903. She was not ready to begin operations, but completed some short test and training dredges with her new crew. Among the things that the testing revealed was that her boiler problems had not been fixed. Chinook went to the shipyard in Portland where 14 patches on the boilers were repaired in April 1904.

In May and June 1904, Chinook was finally able to begin dredging the Columbia Bar. In that two month period, she dredged for 40 days, and removed 141,476 cubic yards (108,166 m^{3}) of sand and gravel from the river at a cost of $0.143 per yard. In fiscal year 1905, Chinook removed an additional 245,220 cubic yards (187,480 m^{3}). Dredging was discontinued in April 1905 and the ship was laid up. Once again, the problem was that her boilers were unsafe and there was no money to fix them.

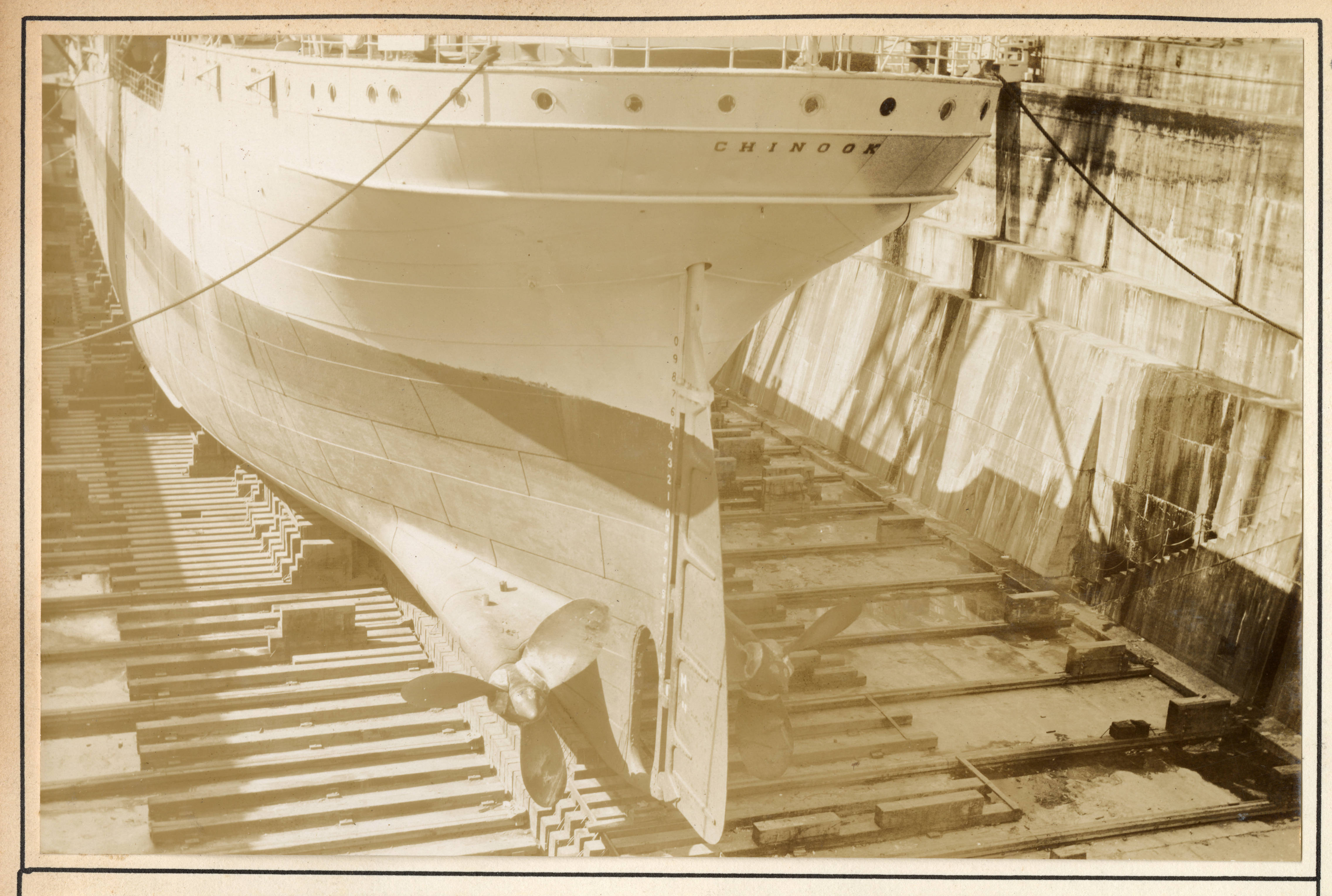
Chinook in drydock in 1932

The ship was idle for four years. Finally, plans were made to replace her four boilers and convert them from coal to oil-burning. During the same shipyard visit, tons of steel in her unneeded passenger cabins and superstructure were to be removed so as to give her a smaller draft, allowing her to work in shallower water. Bids for the work were opened on 22 December 1909 and the work completed on 25 August 1910. The cost of this refit was $137,075. Her new displacement was reported as 7,400 tons. Another shipyard visit in 1914 added two 30-inch (760 mm) centrifugal pumps connected to drag arms 30 inches in diameter. These changes significantly improved dredging performance. By the end of the 1915 dredging season, Chinook was able to dredge 10,000 cubic yards (7,600 m^{3}) in an eight-hour shift. She had two full crews aboard to extend her working days when the weather and seas allowed.

The Columbia Bar was too rough for dredging in the stormy winter months, so Chinook dredged from May to October. She was idle or undergoing maintenance the rest of the year. When conditions were calm, she would work productive 16-hour days. For example, on 13 May 1916 she removed 16,280 cubic yards (12,450 m^{3}) of sand weighing approximately 32,000 tons from the shipping channel. In June 1918, Chinook set a ship record, removing 370,000 cubic yards (280,000 m^{3}). As a result of her work, other dredges, and the construction of jetties at the river mouth, in 1918, the shipping channel at the Columbia Bar was 40 feet (12 m) deep and 1,000 feet (0.30 km) wide. This met the Congressional mandate for the river and Chinook was reassigned. She left Astoria on 22 January 1919.

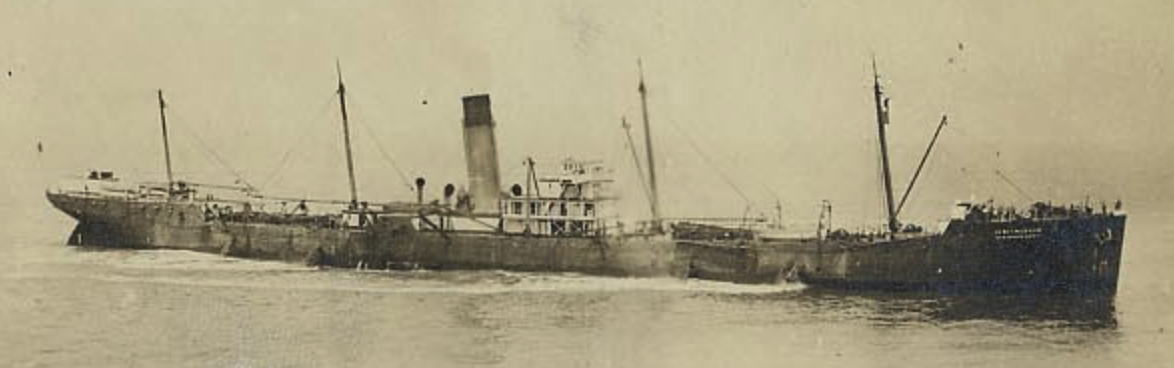
Chinook photographed at Charleston, South Carolina in 1919

Chinook arrived in Charleston, South Carolina, via the Panama Canal, on 27 February 1919. She participated in a project to deepen the channel into the harbor. She was then transferred to Hampton Roads, Virginia to dredge the Thimble Shoal channel. She worked on this project intermittently from August 1919 to October 1925 during which time she removed 9,569,968 cubic yards (7,316,766 m^{3}) of material. The ship spent much of the remainder of her career assigned to the Portsmouth, Virginia District of the Corps of Engineers and returned to the same channels and rivers multiple times to maintain water depth in the face of constant silting.

Chinook completed a variety of short-term assignments around in the country. At the end of 1920, Chinook was ordered to work in Galveston, Texas. In 1931, she spent a month dredging the channel to Philadelphia. In 1932, and 1933 she was dispatched to New Orleans. Chinook dredged the Egmont Key channel in Florida at various times from 1934 to 1936 In 1936 and 1937, she completed a dredging project in New York Harbor before returning to work in Tampa Bay in 1938. Later that year, she spent 30 days deepening Winyah Bay, South Carolina.

In 1925, Newport News Shipbuilding replaced her four boilers with six new ones, and overhauled a number of other systems for $98,500. In 1926, her 20-inch drag arms were removed.

== Obsolescence, sale, and scrapping ==
Chinook was idled in July 1946 and decommissioned in October 1946. She was replaced at Norfolk by USED Comber. Chinook was sold for scrap to the Doane Salvage Company of Bordentown, New Jersey in 1946. The original ship's bell, forged for Mohawk, and which sailed on Grant and Chinook, is held by the US Army Corps of Engineers.
