= 4th Kentucky Cavalry Regiment =

- Active: December 24, 1861 – August 21, 1865
- Country: United States
- Allegiance: Union
- Branch: Cavalry
- Engagements: Kentucky Campaign; Tullahoma Campaign; Battle of Chickamauga; Atlanta campaign Battle of Ladiga

The 4th Kentucky Cavalry Regiment was a cavalry regiment that served in the Union Army during the American Civil War.

== Service ==
The 4th Kentucky Cavalry Regiment was organized at the state fairgrounds in Louisville, Kentucky, on December 24, 1861, and mustered in for a three-year enlistment at Bardstown, Kentucky, on January 6, 1862. It was mustered in under the command of Colonel Jesse Bayles.

The regiment was with the unattached cavalry, Army of the Ohio, to September 1862. 1st Brigade, Cavalry Division, Army of the Ohio, to October 1862. District of Louisville, Kentucky, Department of the Ohio, to November 1862. District of Western Kentucky, Department of the Ohio, to January 1863. 1st Brigade, 1st Cavalry Division, Army of the Cumberland, to July 1863. 3rd Brigade, 1st Division, Cavalry Corps, Army of the Cumberland, to November 1864. 3rd Brigade, 1st Division, Cavalry Corps, Military Division Mississippi, to January 1865. 2nd Brigade, 1st Division, Cavalry Corps, Military Division Mississippi, to August 1865.

The 4th Kentucky Cavalry mustered out of service at Macon, Georgia, on August 21, 1865.

== Detailed service ==
Moved to Bardstown, Kentucky, January 6, 1862, and duty there until March. Moved from Bardstown to Nashville, Tennessee, March 26, 1862, then to Wartrace, Tennessee, April 8, and duty in that vicinity until July. Action at Lebanon May 5. Readyville June 7. Rankin's Ferry near Jasper June 18. Shell Mountain June 21. Battle Creek June 21 and July 5. Murfreesboro July 13 (4 companies). Moved to Tullahoma July 13, and duty there until August. Sparta August 4 (detachment). Raid on Louisville & Nashville Railroad August 19–21 (detachment). March to Louisville, Kentucky, in pursuit of Bragg August 22-September 26. Pursuit of Bragg into Kentucky October 1–22. Near Perryville October 6–7. Near Mountain Gap October 14 and 16. Duty on southern border of Kentucky until February 1863. Ordered to Nashville, Tennessee, February 9, then to Murfreesboro and Franklin, Tenn. Expedition to Spring Hill March 4–5. Franklin March 4. Thompson's Station, Spring Hill, March 5. Expedition from Franklin to Columbia March 8–12. Thompson's Station March 9. Rutherford Creek March 10–11. Spring Hill March 19. Near Thompson's Station March 23. Little Harpeth March 25. Near Franklin March 31. Thompson's Station May 2. Franklin June 4. Triune June 9. Tullahoma Campaign June 23-July 7. Uniontown and Rover June 23. Middleton June 24. Fosterville, Guy's Gap and Shelbyville June 27. Expedition to Huntsville July 13–22. Passage of Cumberland Mountains and Tennessee River and Chickamauga Campaign August 16-September 22. Maysville, Alabama, August 21 and 28. Reconnaissance from Alpine, Georgia, toward Summerville September 10. Skirmishes at Summerville September 10 and 15. Battle of Chickamauga September 19–21. Moved to Bellefonte, Alabama, September 25–30. Operations against Wheeler and Roddy September 30-October 2. Moved to Caperton's Ferry October 2, and duty there until December 2. Moved to Rossville, Georgia, December 2–5, and duty there until January 6, 1864. Scout toward Dalton December 12, 1863. Skirmish at Lafayette December 12. Scout to Lafayette December 21–23. Veterans on furlough January to March 1864. Near Chattanooga until May. Atlanta campaign May to September. Duty in rear of army covering and protecting railroad at Wauhatchie, Lafayette, Calhoun, Dalton, and Resaca. At Wauhatchie May 5 to June 18. (A detachment at Lexington, Kentucky, June 10, 1864.) At Lafayette until August 4. Actions at Lafayette June 24 and 30. At Calhoun August 4 to October 12. Pine Log Creek and near Fairmount August 14. Resaca October 12–13. Near Summerville October 18. Little River, Alabama, October 20. Leesburg October 21. Ladiga, Terrapin Creek, October 28. Moved to Louisville, Kentucky, November 3–9. Operations against Lyon in Kentucky December 6–28. Hopkinsville, Kentucky, December 16. At Nashville, Tennessee, until January 9, 1865. Moved to Gravelly Springs, Alabama, and duty there until March. Wilson's Raid from Chickasaw, Alabama, to Macon, Georgia, March 22-May 1. Six-Mile Creek March 31. Selma April 2. Montgomery April 12. Wetumpka April 13. Fort Tyler, West Point, April 16. Capture of Macon April 20. Duty at Macon and in the Department of Georgia until August.

== Casualties ==
The regiment lost a total of 180 men during service; 1 officer and 30 enlisted men killed or mortally wounded, 1 officer and 148 enlisted men died of disease.

== Commanders ==
- Colonel Jesse Bayles
- Colonel Wickliffe Cooper
- Colonel V. Clay Smith

== Notable members ==
- Major John F. Weston - Medal of Honor recipient for action near Wetumpka, Alabama, April 13, 1865

== See also ==
- List of Kentucky Civil War Units
- Kentucky in the Civil War
