= John F. Weston =

American Union Army officer (1845–1917)

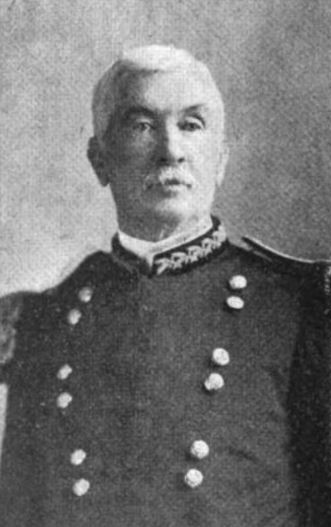
- Born: November 13, 1845; Louisville, Kentucky, US
- Died: August 3, 1917 (aged 71); Briarcliff Manor, New York, US
- Burial place: Arlington National Cemetery
- Military career
- Allegiance: United States of America; Union
- Branch: United States Army
- Service years: 1861–1865, 1867–1909
- Rank: Major General
- Unit: 4th Regiment Kentucky Volunteer Cavalry
- Conflicts: American Civil War; Spanish–American War
- Awards: Medal of Honor

John Francis Weston (November 13, 1845 – August 3, 1917) was a Union Army officer in the American Civil War and a recipient of the United States military's highest decoration, the Medal of Honor, for his actions during a raid on Confederate shipping. He was a brigadier general of United States Volunteers in the Spanish–American War. Weston retired from the U.S. regular army in 1909 as a major general. Having been assistant commissary general of subsistence and commissary general of subsistence from 1897 to 1905, including commissary general for the American forces in Cuba during the Spanish–American War, Weston finished his career as the highest ranking U.S. Army officer in the Philippines and, in the last year of his service, as commander of the Department of California.

== Biography ==
John Francis Weston was born in Louisville, Kentucky on November 13, 1845. He joined the Union Army's 4th Regiment Kentucky Volunteer Cavalry on November 26, 1861, having just turned age 16. Weston's father sympathized with the Confederacy and Weston's uncle and brother joined the Confederate States Army. Weston was promoted to captain on January 9, 1863, and to major on November 1, 1864.

On April 13, 1865, Weston participated in a raid to destroy Confederate supply boats near Wetumpka, Alabama. Through an audacious ruse, Weston and 5 men managed to capture the boats. For these actions, he was awarded the Medal of Honor several decades later, on April 9, 1898. Weston was mustered out of the Union Army volunteer service on August 21, 1865.

After the war, Weston started the study of law but gave it up in favor of rejoining the army. On August 9, 1867, Weston was commissioned as a second lieutenant in the 7th U.S. Cavalry Regiment of the regular U.S. Army. He was promoted to first lieutenant on November 27, 1868. He was promoted to captain and commissary of subsistence on November 24, 1875. On August 1, 1892, Weston was promoted to major and commissary of subsistence. On November 17, 1897, Weston was promoted to lieutenant colonel and assistant commissary general. On April 30, 1898, he was promoted to colonel and assistant commissary general.

With the outbreak of the Spanish–American War, John F. Weston was commissioned brigadier general in the United States Volunteers on September 21, 1898. His service as commissary general for Major General William Rufus Shafter, commander of the U.S. Army forces fighting the Spanish in Cuba, at Santiago, Cuba received favorable notice. On March 24, 1899, he was honorably discharged from the volunteers and returned to his regular army duties.

On December 6, 1900, Weston was promoted to brigadier general and appointed commissary general in the regular U.S. Army, which he accepted on December 13, 1900. Weston was promoted to major general, USA, on October 8, 1905, and accepted the promotion on the same date. He was sent to command the Northwest Division in St. Louis, Missouri but a month later he was sent to the Philippines and became the highest ranking U.S. Army officer there. Although the Manila Times said on March 13, 1908, that Weston expected to remain in the Philippines for the remainder of his army career, the U.S. Secretary of War's report to Congress for the year showed that from January 13, 1909, to June 30, 1909, Major General Weston commanded the Department of California. John F. Weston retired from the U.S. Army on November 13, 1909.

General Weston was a companion of the District of Columbia Commandery of the Military Order of the Loyal Legion of the United States.

Weston died in Briarcliff Manor, New York on August 3, 1917, at age 71, and was buried at Arlington National Cemetery in Virginia.

== Medal of Honor citation ==
Weston's official Medal of Honor citation reads:

This officer, with a small detachment, while en route to destroy steamboats loaded with supplies for the enemy, was stopped by an unfordable river, but with 5 of his men swam the river, captured 2 leaky canoes, and ferried his men across. He then encountered and defeated the enemy, and on reaching Wetumpka found the steamers anchored in midstream. By a ruse obtained possession of a boat, with which he reached the steamers and demanded and received their surrender.

== See also ==
- List of Medal of Honor recipients
