= Naomi Flores =

Filipino resistance member and spy

- Born: 1921; Baguio, Philippine Islands
- Died: 2013 (aged 91–92); United States
- Other name: Looter
- Occupation: Hairdresser
- Known for: Undercover work to assist Allied prisoners of war in the Philippines during World War II
- Awards: U.S. Medal of Freedom

Naomi Flores (1921–2013) (code name Looter) was active in the Philippine resistance to the Japanese occupation of the Philippines in World War II. Flores was a member of the "Miss U Spy Ring." Working clandestinely and at great risk to herself, she delivered life-saving supplies and messages to American and Filipino prisoners of war in prison camps. She later married an American and moved to the United States. She was honored by the United States with a Medal of Freedom in 1948.

== Early life ==
According to her daughter, Flores was born in Baguio, Philippines. She was an orphan and was raised in the household of a retired American Army officer, William E. Dosser. She was an Igorot, the Indigenous peoples in the mountains of Luzon Island. When Japan invaded the Philippines in December 1941, Flores was a 20-year old hairdresser in a beauty salon in Manila.

== Camp O'Donnell ==
In May 1942, Flores met Margaret "Peggy" Utinsky at the beauty salon. Utinsky was an American citizen who had avoided detention by the Japanese occupiers by claiming to be Lithuanian. Utinsky and Flores had a common interest in gathering supplies to help American and Filipino POWs imprisoned in Camp O'Donnell, located about 110 km (68 miles) north of Manila. Flores moved into Utinsky's apartment and became, in Utinsky's words, her "right-hand man." In June, Utinsky and Flores journeyed together to Capas, the nearest town to the POW camp and delivered clothing, medicine, and money to the Red Cross for the POWs. Flores ability to get donations and collect supplies earned her the code name of "Looter." With a half-American, half-Filipina woman named Evangeline Neibert ("Sassy Susie"), Flores returned to O'Donnell several times. In addition to supplies, the two women smuggled medicine, messages, and money into the camp and received messages from the POWS inside. However, O'Donnell was soon closed and the POWs were moved to Cabanatuan camp.

== Arrested by the Japanese ==
A friend asked Flores to hide two American soldiers who had not been captured by the Japanese. Utinsky and Flores hid them at the beauty parlor where Flores had previously worked. An informant told the Japanese about the soldiers and they raided the beauty parlor, captured the two soldiers, and let it be known that they were searching for Flores. Utinsky persuaded Flores to surrender to the Japanese and claim that she did not know the two men were Americans but had only hired them to guard the beauty parlor. During a day-long interrogation, Flores was slapped around, but released. She realized, however, that she was under suspicion and got permission from the Filipino authorities to move out of Manila to Cabanatuan on the pretext that she was needed to take care of a sick aunt, "Mrs. Bell." The city of Cabanatuan was near the POW camp. Neibert took charge of moving goods from Manila to Cabanatuan. Flores was not sorry to leave the apartment she shared with Utinsky. Utinsky had become increasingly irascible and leadership of Miss U shifted toward a Spaniard named Ramon Amusategui and his Filipina wife, Lorenza.

Flores rarely visited Manila after her first arrest, but, on a visit in August 1943, she was arrested again by the Japanese and questioned for three hours. Her forged identification documents were accepted as genuine; the Japanese apparently thought they had detained the wrong woman and released her, but security was tightening and her work was becoming more dangerous. Among others of the Miss U ring, Utinsky was arrested in September 1943, badly beaten, and released in November. In December Ramon Amusategui ordered deliveries of survival packages of food and money to the Cabanatuan POWs to be halted temporarily because of the Japanese crackdown. Amusategui and his wife, Lorenza, were later arrested by the Japanese. Ramon Amusategui died or was executed while imprisoned.

== Cabanatuan ==
At its peak, Cabanatuan camp held 8,000 American soldiers, making it the largest POW camp in the Philippines. This number dropped significantly as nearly one-third died from the hardships of the camp and as soldiers were shipped to other areas to work in slave labor camps. The Japanese captors provided inadequate food and medical care to the POWs.

In 1943 and 1944, now living in Cabanatuan, Flores dressed as a peasant woman and set up a fruit and vegetable stand near where American POWs worked daily in the rice paddies. The POWs on occasion were allowed to buy bananas and peanuts in the market (POWs were paid a small wage for their labor by the Japanese) and Flores found intermediaries among the POWs to deliver messages to the American camp doctor, Colonel James W. Duckworth, the chaplain, Captain Frank L. Tiffany, and Colonel Edward Mack. She set up a supply line with POWs smuggling food, medicine, clothing, and money into the camp and messages out of the camp to Flores. Other women in the market joined her in the smuggling operation. They hid things in the oxcarts that carried sacks of rice into the camp every day. Flores also persuaded the rice merchants doing business with the Japanese and the POWs to help her. With contributions of money from Filipinos in Manila, Flores subsidized the merchants so that they could sell items to POWs at cheaper prices and in greater quantity. She cashed personal checks for POWs and arranged loans with a promise that they would pay back the loans at the end of the war. Her efforts, and those of many other Filipinos, to get additional food and other supplies into the camp made a life or death difference for POWs. Filipinos also sent many gifts to POWs.

Flores lived in "Mrs. Bell's" house in sight of the rice fields where POWs worked every day. On 3 May 1944, in a prearranged signal, Flores ran a hand through her hair to tell a POW contact, a cart driver named Fred Threatt, that she had a package for him. The signal told him that she had buried something in a place known to both of them beneath a tree. Threatt was caught by the Japanese as he uncovered a buried package of medicine. The arrest of Threatt and other cart drivers shut down the smuggling operation. Flores knew that she was in immediate danger of arrest and fled, taking refuge in a friend's house in the city. She stayed hidden for a month and then made her way into the mountains where she joined Lt. Colonel Bernard Anderson's guerillas for the rest of the war.

== Legacy ==
A.V.H. Hartendorp in his 2-volume history, The Japanese Occupation of the Philippines, credits Naomi Flores with being the catalyst for the Miss U Spy Ring. Two Americans with whom she worked, Peggy Utinsky and Claire Phillips, returned to the United States and achieved fame from books they wrote and movies about their experiences as heroes of the Filipino resistance. Flores was given a job by the Red Cross in Manila. She married an American, John J. Jackson, and moved to San Francisco with him. The couple had four children. In 1948, she was awarded the Medal of Freedom. Her daughter said that she died in 2013. A documentary titled "Looter" was made in 2019 about Flores' exploits during World War II.
