= Philinda Rand =

American teacher

- Born: c. 1876; Somerville, Massachusetts, U.S.
- Died: 1972 (aged 95–96); Washington, D.C., U.S.
- Education: Radcliffe College
- Occupation: Thomasite
- Spouse: Thaddeus Delos Anglemyer
- Children: Katharine and Mary
- Parent(s): John B. and Victoria Cheek Rand

Philinda Parsons Rand Anglemyer (1876–1972) was an American English-language teacher in the Philippines. She was among the pioneering five hundred Thomasites who landed on the shores of the Philippines in August 1901 on board the United States Army Transport Thomas.

== Biography ==
Rand is a native of Somerville, Massachusetts. She was born to John B. and Victoria Cheek Rand. She graduated magna cum laude from Radcliffe College (class of 1899), with a degree in zoology. The tall and slender Rand was only twenty-three when she went to the Philippines, right after graduating from Radcliffe College. Her trip to the Philippines was under a program instituted by William Howard Taft, then governor of the Philippine Islands. She wrote journals and letters to her relatives in the U.S. while in the Philippines, mostly to an aunt and a cousin named Katie. During her tenure as an English teacher in the Philippines, she also took pictures that show many aspects of the life in the Philippines at the start of the twentieth century. Most of these photographs were taken mostly in Silay and Lingayen where she resided. Her pictures include people, students, missionaries, buildings, animals, and sceneries from 1901 to 1907. Her journals, letters and photographs are now deposited at the Schlesinger Library on the History of Women in America at Radcliffe College. Her diaries also described her travels to China and Japan.

While in the Philippines, Philinda Rand married a fellow American and another Thomasite, Thaddeus Delos Anglemyer. Her first daughter, Katharine, was born in the Philippines. Rand stayed in the Philippines for seven years.

In 1908, Rand and her family returned to the United States, where her second daughter, Mary, was born. She lived in Washington, Indiana, New York, and New Jersey before finally settling in Washington, D.C. in 1954. She served on local welfare and education committees, worked as a substitute teacher in public schools, and was active in youth and environmental conservation organizations. Rand also had a sister, Marguerite Rand.

== Quotations ==
"We are note merely teachers. We are social assets and emissaries of good will." - an excerpt from one of Philinda Rand's letters

== See also ==
- History of the Philippines
- Philippine English
