= Margaret Utinsky =

American humanitarian (1900–1970)

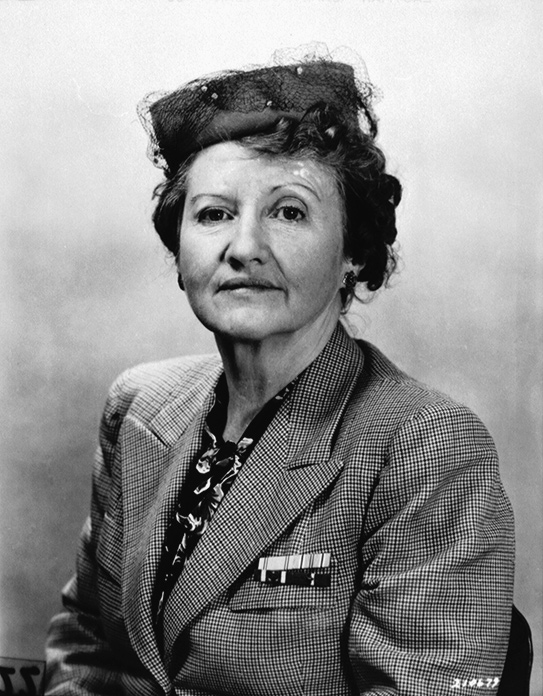
- Margaret Utinsky ("Miss U") in 1945
- Born: Margaret Elizabeth Doolin; August 26, 1900; St. Louis, Missouri, US
- Died: August 30, 1970 (aged 70); Lakewood, California, US
- Other name: Miss U
- Occupation: Nurse
- Known for: Undercover work to assist Allied prisoners of war in the Philippines during World War II

Margaret Elizabeth Doolin "Peggy" Utinsky (August 26, 1900 – August 30, 1970) was an American nurse who worked with the Filipino resistance movement to provide medicine, food, and other items to aid Allied prisoners of war in the Philippines during World War II. She was recognized in 1946 with the Medal of Freedom for her actions.

Most information about her World War II activities comes from her autobiography, Miss U.

== Early life ==
Utinsky was born in St. Louis, Missouri and grew up on a wheat farm in Canada. In 1919, she married John Rowley. He died the following year, leaving her with an infant son, Charles.

On a sojourn to the Philippines in the late 1920s, she met and fell in love with John "Jack" Utinsky, a former Army captain who worked as a civil engineer for the U.S. government. They married in 1934. Margaret and Jack settled into life in Manila.

== World War II ==
As the likelihood of a Japanese attack grew in the Far East, the U.S. military ordered all American wives back to the United States. Unwilling to part from her husband, Utinsky refused to obey the order and took an apartment in Manila while Jack went to work in Bataan. In December 1941, the Japanese invaded the Philippines. When Japanese troops occupied Manila on January 2, 1942, she was forced aboard the Washington, the last ship leaving with Americans, she snuck off the ship at the last moment and returned to hide in her apartment rather than go into internment. She wrote in her book, "To go into an internment camp seemed like the sensible thing to do, but for the life of me I could not see what use I would be to myself or to anyone else cooped up there. ... For from the moment the inconceivable thing happened and the Japanese arrived, there was just one thought in my mind—to find Jack."

Aided by the Army and Navy commissaries and by a Chinese man called Lee, Utinsky hid in an apartment for ten weeks. Upon hearing the news of the fall of Corregidor, she ventured out to search for her husband directly, seeking help from the priests of Malate Convent. Through various contacts, she obtained false papers, creating the identity of Rena Utinsky, a Lithuanian nurse—as Lithuania was a nonbelligerent country under armed occupation by Nazi Germany. She secured a position with the Philippine Red Cross as a nurse, and went to Bataan to search for her husband.

Miss U, detailing Utinsky's work to assist POWs during World War II

She was shocked by the state of the survivors of the Bataan Death March. She resolved to do all she could to help the POWs that survived. Beginning with small actions, she soon became part of a clandestine resistance network that provided food, money, and medicine such as quinine to the thousands of POWs at Camp O'Donnell, and later at the Cabanatuan prison camp. After she learned that her husband had died in the prison camp, she redoubled her efforts to save as many men as possible. Her code name was "Miss U," which also became the title of her 1948 book about her World War II exploits. More often, however, she was called "the old lady" or "auntie," as she was much older than most of her associates.

Suspected of helping prisoners, the Japanese arrested her, held her at Fort Santiago, and tortured her for 32 days. When confronted with passenger log of the Washington listing her name, she insisted she had lied so she could work as a nurse. She was beaten daily, hung with her arms tied behind her back, and sexually assaulted. During one night, five Filipinos were beheaded in front of her cell. On another night, an American soldier was tied to her cell gate and beaten to death. His flesh lodged in her hair. She was then confined to a dungeon for four days without food or water. She never revealed her true identity and was released after signing a statement attesting to her good treatment.

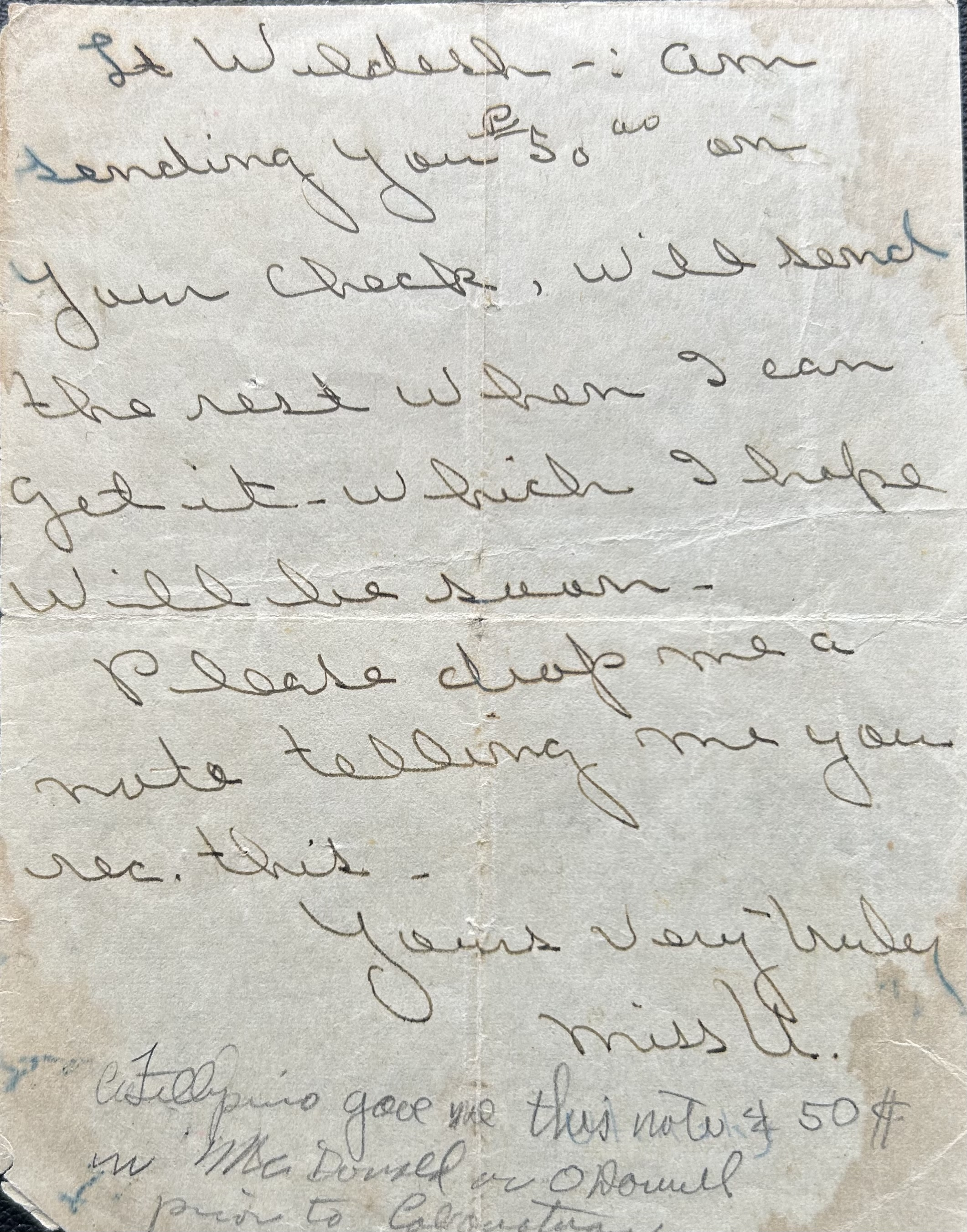
Note from Margaret Utinsky to POW Lt. Myron Wildish at Camp O'Donnell, sent with cash

She spent six weeks recovering from injuries at a Manila hospital. The doctors wanted to amputate her gangrenous leg, but she refused. The hospital was full of Japanese spies, and she was afraid she would reveal secrets while under anesthesia. She directed the surgeons to remove the gangrenous flesh without anesthesia. She left the hospital before fully recovered and escaped to Bataan, where she served as a nurse with the Philippine Commonwealth troops and the Recognized Guerrilla forces, moving from camp to camp in the mountains until liberation in February 1945.

When the combined American and Philippine Commonwealth troops re-entered the Philippines, Utinsky was taken through the Japanese lines by the local people to the American lines. She had lost 45 pounds, 35 percent of her pre-war weight, and an inch in height. Her auburn hair had turned white and she looked like she had aged 25 years. Yet, within a few days, she wrote from memory a 30-page report listing the names of soldiers she knew had been tortured, the names of their torturers, and the names of collaborators and spies. She was attached to the U.S. Army Counter Intelligence Corps, and later was flown to meet the 511 POWs who were rescued from the Cabanatuan POW camp. Most of the original 9,000 American POWs in the Philippines had died or been transported to work camps in Japan or China.

== Miss U Spy Ring ==
A.V.H. Hartendorp, in his two-volume history The Japanese Occupation of the Philippines, tells a different story than Utinsky. He credits a 22-year-old Filipina hairdresser, Naomi Flores (code name "Looter") with being the impetus for the so-called "Miss U Spy Ring," which was an effort to help American Prisoners of War (POWs) survive the difficult conditions in the Japanese POW camp of Cabanatuan.

In August 1942, Flores and Utinsky visited Dr. R. Y. Atienza of the Philippine Red Cross near Cabanatuan and he agreed to assist by smuggling food and medicine into the camp. The two women gathered donations and Flores visited Cabanuatan weekly with money and supplies, even sneaking into the POW camp itself. A number of other people assisted Flores and Utinsky, including Catholic priests, Filipinos, an American, Claire Phillips, and a Spaniard who became the leader of the group, Ramon Amusategui. Flores was arrested several times by the Japanese but released, and continued her work until May 1944 when the operations of the Miss U group were uncovered by the Japanese. Amusategui was executed in October 1944, but Flores escaped, taking refuge with the Hukbalahap guerrillas in the mountains for the remainder of the war. After the war, Flores was given a position with the Red Cross.

The activities of the Miss U Spy Ring may have also led to the execution in December 1944 of four American civilians resident in the Santo Tomas Internment Camp in Manila. Prominent internee leaders A. F. Duggleby and Carroll Cawkins Grinnell and two apparently innocent men were executed in December 1944 for suspicion of aiding the POWs and anti-Japanese guerrillas. According to one account, Catholic priests Lalor and Patrick Kelly, also helpful to Flores and Utinsky, were killed by the Japanese during the Battle of Manila in February 1945. Another account about the Columban priests at the Malate Church, which had been operating as a hospital, was that while some of them were indeed killed by the Japanese, others, including Father Lalor, were killed when the church / hospital was bombed during the Battle of Manila. It is not known whether the church was targeted or collateral damage. The graves of the Columban Fathers are located in a wall of the church, where a plaque commemorates their heroism. Several of them, including Father Lalor, were also posthumously awarded the Medal of Freedom.

== Post-War ==
After visiting Lee once more, Utinsky returned to the United States. She was awarded the Medal of Freedom in 1946. Her autobiography, Miss U: Angel of the Underground, was published in 1948.

She died in Lakewood, California, at Pioneer Sanitarium on August 30, 1970. She is buried at Roosevelt Memorial Park in Gardena, California.

== Legacy ==
Actress Connie Nielsen portrayed an idealized version of Utinsky in the 2005 film The Great Raid, which is based on the 1945 raid to free POWs at Cabanatuan prison camp.
