= Onofre Corpuz =

Filipino academic, economist, historian, and government official (1926–2013)

National Scientist Onofre Corpuz
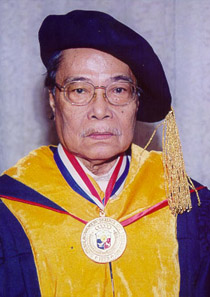
- Official portrait, National Academy of Science and Technology

37th Minister of Education, Culture & Sports
- In office July 1979 – January 1984
- President: Ferdinand Marcos
- Preceded by: Juan Manuel
- Succeeded by: Jaime Laya

Secretary of Education
- In office December 16, 1967 – April 20, 1971
- President: Ferdinand Marcos
- Preceded by: Carlos P. Romulo
- Succeeded by: Juan Manuel

13th President of the University of the Philippines
- In office 1975–1979
- President: Ferdinand Marcos
- Preceded by: Salvador P. Lopez
- Succeeded by: Emanuel V. Soriano

1st Chairperson of the Career Executive Service Board
- In office 1973–1978
- President: Ferdinand Marcos
- Preceded by: None
- Succeeded by: Jacobo C. Clave

Personal details
- Born: Onofre Dizon Corpuz; December 1, 1926 Camiling, Tarlac, Insular Government of the Philippine Islands
- Died: March 23, 2013 (aged 86) Quezon City, Philippines
- Spouse: Dr. Aurora Corpuz
- Education: University of the Philippines Diliman (B.A., 1950); University of Illinois at Urbana–Champaign (M.A., 1953); Harvard University (M.P.A, 1955; Ph.D., 1956)
- Occupation: Professor, Public servant
- Profession: Economic historian, Political scientist
- Awards: Order of National Scientists of the Philippines (2004)

Onofre Dizon Corpuz ONS (December 1, 1926 – March 23, 2013) was a Filipino academic, economist, and historian. He served as the Secretary of Education of the Philippines from 1968 to 1971 and was the 13th president of the University of the Philippines System from 1975 to 1979. Dr. Corpuz was later named Minister of Education under the parliamentary system wherein he was also member of the now defunct Batasang Pambansa (National Assembly) from 1979 to 1983.

Being the first one to come up with the idea of establishing the Career Executive Service (CES) in the Philippines based on existent bureaucratic structures in other countries, Corpuz served as the first chairman of the Career Executive Service Board (CESB) from 1973 to 1978.

In 2004, he was named National Scientist of the Philippines for his contributions to Filipino scholarship particularly in areas of economics, history, political science, and public administration. At the time of his death, he was a Professor Emeritus at the School of Economics of the University of the Philippines Diliman.

== Early life and education ==
Dr. Onofre Dizon Corpuz was born on December 1, 1926, at Taft Street, Poblacion, Camiling, Tarlac to Remigio Corpuz, a school teacher and Isabel Dizon.

He finished his primary and secondary education in his hometown province of Tarlac, Philippines. He was salutatorian of Camiling Elementary School in 1938 and of Tarlac High School in 1944 before he took up his BA degree at the University of the Philippines at Diliman from 1946 to 1950 wherein he graduated magna cum laude. He joined the Upsilon Sigma Phi fraternity in 1947. It was also here that he joined and later served as the resident Governor of the Pan Xenia fraternity.

Corpuz obtained his master's degree at the University of Illinois at Urbana–Champaign in the United States in 1953. He later finished a Master of Public Administration (MPA) degree in 1955 and a PhD in Political Economy and Government in 1956 from Harvard University.

In 1976, the Royal Chulalongkorn University in Thailand awarded him a PhD, honoris causa in 1976.

== Career ==
=== During the Marcos administration ===
Dr. Corpuz was appointed Undersecretary of the Department of Education by former President then dictator Ferdinand Marcos Sr. in 1966 and was promoted to Secretary in 1968. As head of the country's education department, he joined the Southeast Asia Ministers of Education Council. He was also concurrently chairperson of the Population Commission.

In 1972, he became the Founding President of the government-owned Development Academy of the Philippines. Corpuz later ran for a position and won in the Batasang Pambansa, the legislative body of the parliamentary Philippines during the Marcos Sr. dictatorship. As a member of the legislature, he served as Minister of Education. He took a break from government service in 1983.

=== During the Aquino administration ===
The economist reentered government as member of the board of the National Historical Institute in 1987 during the time of former President Corazon C. Aquino.

=== Later career ===
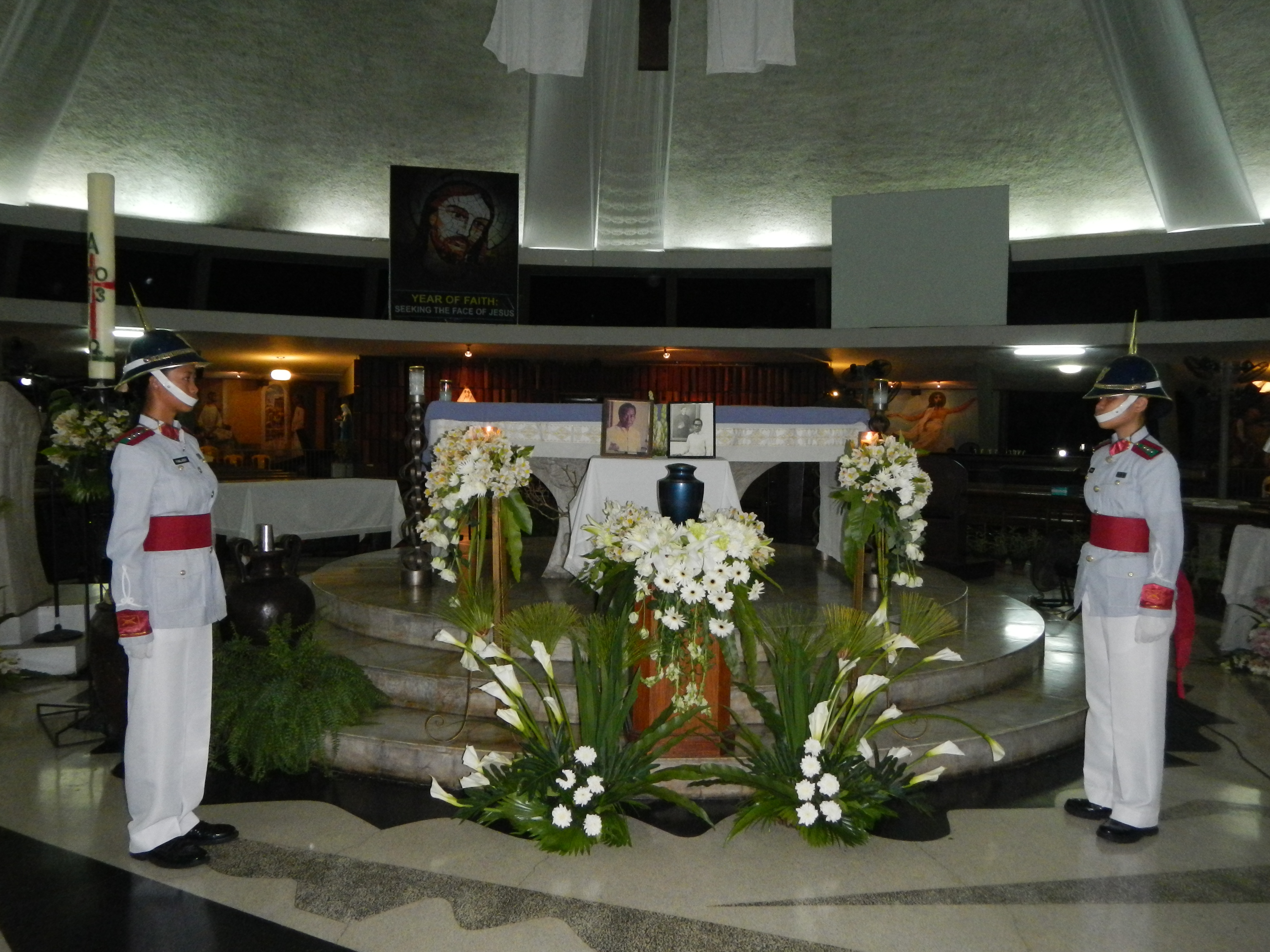
Necrological service of Dr. Onofre Corpuz at Parish of the Holy Sacrifice.

Professor Corpuz served as president of the now defunct The Manila Chronicle from 1994 to 1996. Earlier, he was part of the Board of Governors of the East-West Center in Honolulu, Hawaii from 1974 to 1976. East-West Center is closely linked to several academic institutions in Hawaii, particularly the University of Hawaii.

== Research ==
Dr. Corpuz conducted research at the United States Library of Congress, the Widener and Houghton Libraries at Harvard University, the New York Public Library, the British Museum Library, and the General Archive of the Indies in Sevilla, Spain. He was also a visiting research associate at the School of Oriental and African Studies, University of London.

His specializations included economic history, public administration and policy. His previous research formed the basis for his best-known published works, which include: The Philippines (1965; Prentice-Hall); Roots of the Filipino Nation 2 vols. (1989; Aklahi Foundation); An economic history of the Philippines (1997; University of the Philippines Press); and Saga and triumph: the Philippine revolution against Spain (2002; University of the Philippines Press).

== Personal life ==
Professor Corpuz was married to retired professor and former dean of the College of Home Economics (CHE) of University of the Philippines Dr. Aurora G. Corpuz.

Academic offices
Preceded by Salvador P. Lopez	President of the University of the Philippines; 1975–1979	Succeeded by Emanuel V. Soriano
