= I Was an American Spy =

1951 film by Lesley Selander

I Was An American Spy
- Directed by: Lesley Selander
- Screenplay by: Sam Roeca
- Based on: Manila Espionage by Claire Phillips and Myron B. Goldsmith "I Was an American Spy" by Claire Phillips and Myron B. Goldsmith
- Produced by: David Diamond, Ben Schwalb
- Starring: Ann Dvorak; Douglas Kennedy
- Cinematography: Harry Neumann
- Edited by: Philip Cahn
- Music by: Edward J. Kay
- Production company: David Diamond Productions
- Distributed by: Allied Artists Pictures
- Release date: April 14, 1951
- Running time: 85 minutes
- Country: United States
- Language: English

I Was an American Spy is a 1951 American war drama film based the true story of Claire Phillips as told in her 1947 book Manila Espionage and a subsequent article in Reader's Digest. Phillips was an American expatriate who conducted espionage in Japan during World War II and was captured, tortured and sentenced to death before her rescue. The film, produced by Allied Artists and directed by Lesley Selander, stars Ann Dvorak in the title role.

== Plot ==
Claire Phillips, an American-born Filipina living in Manila, is working as a cafe entertainer on the eve of the attack on Pearl Harbor. She marries American soldier John Phillips and witnesses the Japanese invasion of the Philippines during the Battle of Bataan. Her husband is captured, and she watches as he is killed by machine-gun fire during the Bataan Death March after he defies the order of a cruel Japanese soldier not to drink from typhoid-contaminated water. In retaliation, Phillips shoots and kills a Japanese soldier. She then joins the Filipino resistance, and in order to obtain intelligence to send to the United States, she opens a nightclub catering to Japanese officers. Phillips is code-named "High Pockets" for her habit of stashing items in her brassiere. She successfully passes useful intelligence to the American forces and the Filipino underground, but she is discovered, imprisoned and water-tortured by the Japanese. Sentenced to death, she is rescued in the nick of time by American soldiers who storm New Bilibid Prison, killing the Japanese guards.

== Cast ==
- Ann Dvorak as Claire "High Pockets" Phillips
- Gene Evans as Cpl. John Boone
- Douglas Kennedy as Sgt. John Phillips
- Richard Loo as Col. Masanoto
- Leon Lontok as Pacio
- Chabing (Elizabeth Cooper) as Lolita
- Philip Ahn as Capt. Arito
- Lisa Ferraday as Dorothy Fuentes
- Riley Hill as Thompson

== Production ==
The film is based on the true story of Claire Phillips as told in her 1947 book Manila Espionage and in an article in Reader's Digest titled "I Was an American Spy". Phillips served as a technical adviser during production and assisted in the promotion of the film, She became a close friend of star Ann Dvorak and admired Dvorak's dedication in playing the difficult role.

== Reception ==
In a contemporary review for The New York Times, critic Howard Thompson wrote: "Unfortunately, this little drama, while occasionally tense, isn't especially stimulating, either as a narrative or as a tribute to personal courage. Not that all the ingredients for a rousing blend weren't on hand. ... [T]he film unreels like the pat, familiar Mata Hari type story it was not. The adaptation by Sam Roeca is on an academic level. Lesley Selander's direction is plain sluggish. And David Diamond's inexpensive production, no crime in itself, doesn't enhance either. It is sad though to see a gallant lady on display in such a threadbare little showcase."
