= Salvador P. Lopez =

Filipino politician and academic administrator

10th Secretary of Foreign Affairs
- In office July 1963 – May 9, 1964
- President: Diosdado Macapagal
- Preceded by: Emmanuel Pelaez
- Succeeded by: Mauro Mendez

12th President of the University of the Philippines
- In office 1969–1975
- Preceded by: Carlos P. Romulo
- Succeeded by: Onofre Corpuz

Chairman of the United Nations Commission on Human Rights
- In office 1966–1966

Personal details
- Born: Salvador Ponce Lopez; May 27, 1911 Currimao, Ilocos Norte, Philippine Islands
- Died: October 18, 1993 (aged 82) Manila, Philippines
- Education: University of the Philippines Manila (BA, MA)

Salvador Ponce Lopez (May 27, 1911 – October 18, 1993) was a Filipino writer, journalist, educator, diplomat and statesman.

He studied at the University of the Philippines (UP) and obtained a Bachelor of Arts degree in English in 1931 and a Master of Arts degree in Philosophy in 1933. At UP, he was drama critic for the Philippine Collegian and member of the Upsilon Sigma Phi fraternity. From 1933 to 1936, Lopez taught literature and journalism at the University of Manila. He also became a daily columnist and magazine editor of the Philippine Herald until World War II.

In 1940, Lopez's essay "Literature and Society" won the Commonwealth Literary Awards. His essay posited that art must have substance and that poet José García Villa's adherence to "art for art's sake" is decadent. The essay provoked debates, the discussion centering on proletarian literature, i.e., engaged or committed literature versus the orientation of literature as an art for the sake of art itself. In 1953, Lopez authored an important report on Freedom of Information for the United Nations.

He was appointed by President Diosdado Macapagal as Secretary of Foreign Affairs and then became ambassador to the United Nations for six years before being reassigned to France for seven years. He would also serve as Chairperson of the United Nations Commission on Human Rights.

Lopez was the president of the University of the Philippines from 1969 to 1975. He established a system of democratic consultation wherein decisions such as promotions and appointments were made through greater participation by faculty and administrative personnel; he also reorganized UP into the UP System.

It was during Lopez's presidency that UP students were politically radicalized, primarily towards Kabataang Makabayan and Samahan ng Demokratikong Kabataan, launching mass protests against the Marcos administration right from the so-called "First Quarter Storm" in 1970 to the Diliman uprising and the subsequent commune in 1971.

== Role in the Diliman Commune ==
During the opening days of the uprising on February 1, Lopez initially deployed security members to respond on reports of blockades but were eventually routed due to student resistance. As the security members retreated, Inocente Campos took the opportunity on the security gap to drive towards UP students and, when his car was capsized by pillbox explosives and molotovs, shot them, fatally wounding Sonny Mesina. The latter was subsequently hailed a martyr during the days of the commune and later. He was then confronted by student council leader Ericson Baculinao for allowing the shooting to happen. In the following days, Lopez called on all UP students, faculty, and employees to defend the university and its autonomy from Marcos's militarization, as the military sought to occupy the campus in search of alleged leftists, activists, and other opponents of the Marcos administration. As the military withdrew on the 4th, however, he called for the dismantlement of the barricades, of which such offers were refused, and the Diliman Commune was founded the same day. The barricades eventually went down voluntarily by the 9th.

Academic offices
Preceded by Carlos P. Romulo	President of the University of the Philippines; 1969–1975	Succeeded by Onofre D. Corpuz
