= Claire Phillips =

American spy, entertainer, club owner and writer

- World War II spy "High Pockets"
- Born: Claire Maybelle Snyder; December 2, 1907; Michigan, U.S.
- Died: May 22, 1960 (aged 52); Portland, Oregon, U.S.
- Other names: Clara Fuentes; Dorothy Clara Fuentes "High Pockets"
- Occupations: Entertainer and club owner
- Known for: World War II spy
- Notable work: Manila Espionage
- Spouse(s): (1) Manuel Fuentes (2) John V. Phillips (3) Robert R. Clavier
- Children: Dian (Diane) Claire Fuentes
- Awards: Medal of Freedom

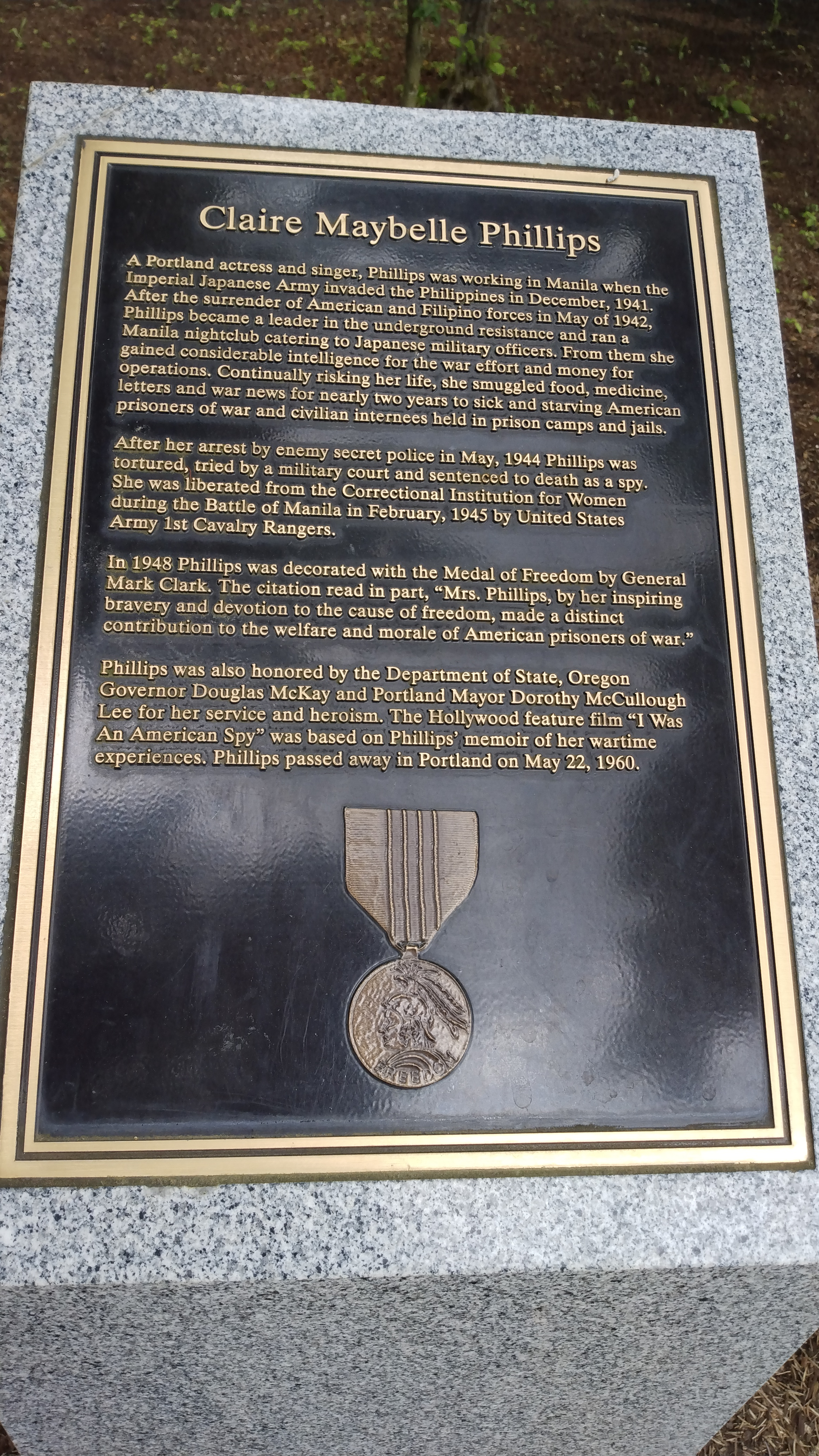

Claire Maybelle Snyder (December 2, 1907 – May 22, 1960), also known as Clara Fuentes, Clara Phillips, Dorothy Fuentes as well as High Pockets, was an American spy, entertainer, club owner, and writer most noted for her exploits in the Japanese-occupied Philippines. She was portrayed by Ann Dvorak in the 1951 movie I Was an American Spy. She was also the author of Manila Espionage, a book about her wartime experiences. In 1951, she was awarded the Medal of Freedom.

Many of Phillips' statements and claims about spying were later determined to be "without foundation," although in 1957 she was awarded $1,349.21 by the United States Court of Claims in compensation for assistance she had provided to American prisoners of war and Filipino resistance movements.

== Early years ==
Claire Maybelle Snyder was born on December 2, 1907, in Michigan to Jesse Edgar Snyder, a marine engineer, and his wife Mable. Claire's family moved to Portland, Oregon, when she was a young child. She attended Franklin High School in Portland before running away to join a traveling circus. Some accounts give her birth name as Mabel Clara Dela Taste.

== Pre-war ==
In the 1930s, she worked in night clubs in the northwest U.S. and later joined a musical stock company that toured east Asia including Hong Kong and Manila. While on tour in the Philippines, she met Filipino sailor Manuel Fuentes at a night club where she was performing. They married and had a daughter, Dian (later Americanized to Diane) Claire. The marriage did not last long and soon the couple divorced. She briefly returned to Portland.

Before the beginning of the war, Claire, now Claire Fuentes, returned to the Philippines and was singing in a night club in Manila where she met her future second husband, Sgt. John V. Phillips of the 31st Infantry Regiment. After the bombing of Pearl Harbor, the couple retreated with the army away from Manila. On December 24, 1941, they were married in the jungle.

== War years ==
During the invasion of the Philippines by Japanese forces in 1941 and early 1942, her husband was captured. He later died in a prison camp, though she did not learn this until later. After the surrender of the American forces in the Philippines on April 9, 1942, she was persuaded by an American soldier turned insurgent named Cpl. John Boone (also from the 31st Infantry) to help the resistance.

Working with a young Filipino dancer named Fely Corcuera, Phillips arranged forged papers and created a new identity for herself as a Philippine-born Italian dancer named Dorothy Clara Fuentes. Together the two women established a cabaret titled "Club Tsubaki", a gentleman's club that would quickly become popular with Japanese officers in Manila. Using the cabaret as a cover, Phillips was a member of the so-called "Miss U spy ring" that obtained information from the Japanese officers who patronized the club. The spy ring was intended to support the Philippine resistance. Some of the information she collected was transmitted to American forces in the Pacific and used to predict and counter Japanese military activities.

In addition to espionage, she worked extensively with Naomi Flores, Margaret Utinsky and anti-Japanese guerrilla movements to smuggle desperately needed food, medicines, supplies and information to the prisoners of the Cabanatuan prisoner of war camp. To the prisoners of the camp, she became known as "High Pockets". The name was said to be a description of her method of smuggling messages by hiding them in her brassiere.

On May 23, 1944, Phillips was apprehended by the Kempeitai (the Japanese military police) after one of the messengers she used to contact the POWs at Cabanatuan was captured, interrogated and killed. She was taken to Bilibid Prison, the infamous Japanese prison in Manila (two miles from the American prison camp), where she was tortured for information. She was held in solitary confinement for six months and was to be executed for espionage. This sentence was commuted to twelve years' confinement at hard labor. In January 1945, when she was liberated from the prison by American forces, she was near death from starvation.

== Veracity and compensation ==
After World War II, Phillips filed a claim with the United States Court of Claims for $146,850 in return for her wartime services. The Court turned down her claim and determined that she was "guilty of false testimony and fraud." A subsequent 1957 court ruling found that "many" of her "statements and claims were later found to be without foundation", but nevertheless awarded her $1,349.21 for the assistance she furnished to American prisoners of war and Filipino guerrillas.

== Post-war life and literary career ==
After the war, Phillips returned with her daughter, Diane, to the United States, where she wrote Manila Espionage, a book about her experiences. Her story was made into the Hollywood movie I Was an American Spy (1951), starring Ann Dvorak as Phillips. Phillips was a guest on an episode of the television series This Is Your Life that aired March 15, 1950.

Upon the recommendation of General Douglas MacArthur, she received the Medal of Freedom in 1951. She is honored at the Oregon World War II Memorial with a memorial plaque.

Claire Phillips died of meningitis in 1960 at the age of 52.

== Bibliography ==
- Article in "Vet News" Oregon Veterans News Winter 2015 (Oregon Department of Veterans Affairs) page 9 "Oregon's Female Spy:Singer Smuggler, POW, 'Gallant Woman'" (free subscription signup required)
- Groom, Winston. 2005. 1942: The Year That Tried Men's Souls. Atlantic Monthly Press, New York. ISBN 0-87113-889-1
- Phillips, Claire, and Myron B. Goldsmith. 1947. Manila Espionage. Binfolds & Mort, Portland, OR. ASIN B0007EQFT4
- Sides, Hampton. 2001. Ghost Soldiers: The Forgotten Epic Story of World War II's Most Dramatic Mission. Doubleday, New York. ISBN 0-385-49564-1
