= Thomasites =

American teachers in the Philippines

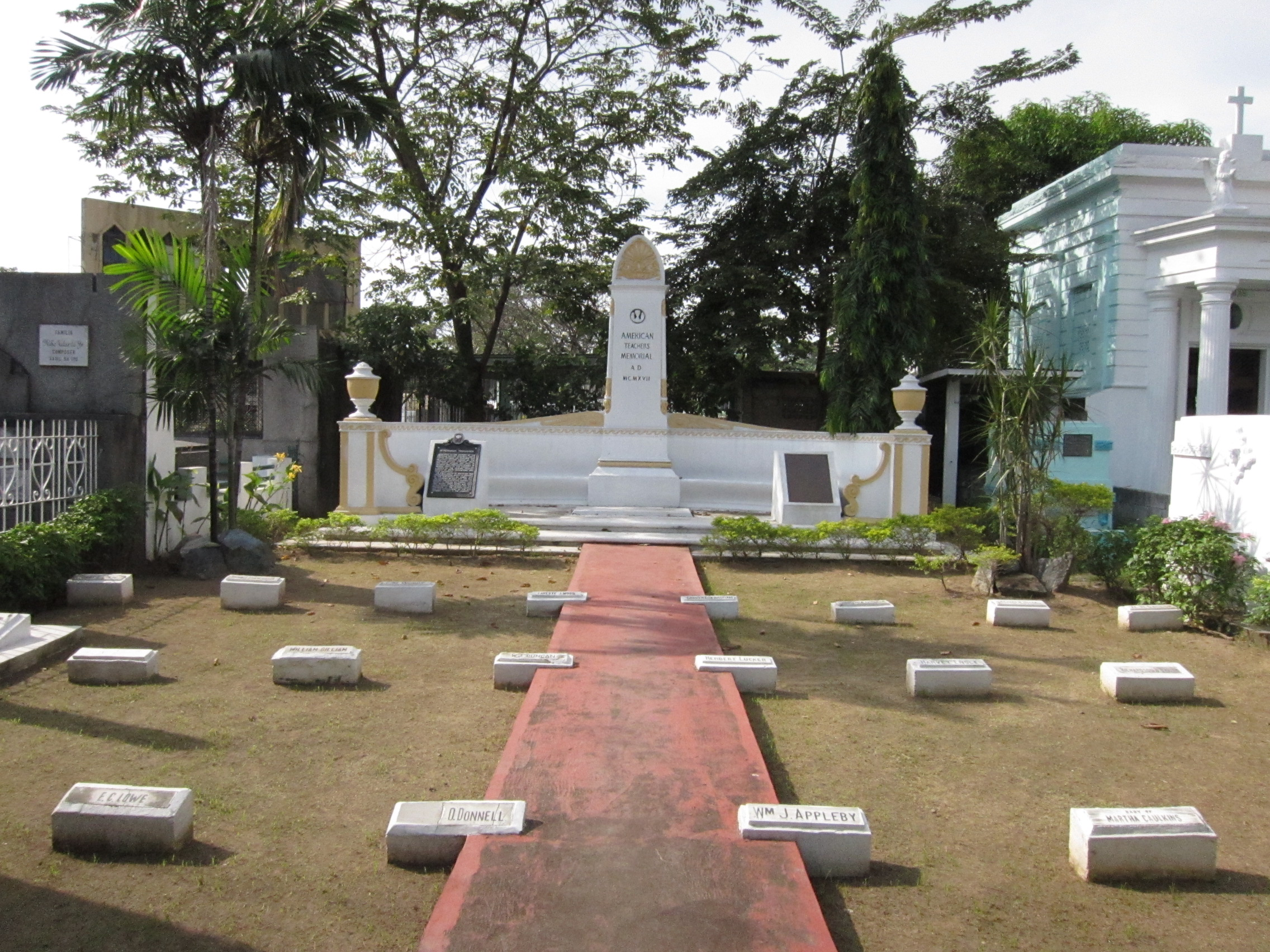
Several Thomasites are interred at the American Teachers Memorial, a special plot inside the Manila North Cemetery. The current memorial was erected in 1917.

The Thomasites were a group of 600 American teachers who traveled from the United States to the newly occupied territory of the Philippines on the US Army Transport Thomas. The group included 346 men and 180 women, hailing from 43 different states and 193 colleges, universities, and normal schools. The term 'Thomasites' (Spanish: Tomasitos) has since expanded to include any teacher who arrived in the first few years of the American colonial period of the Philippines.

Thomas carried nearly 500 Thomasites, who arrived in Manila in August 1901. They represented 192 institutions, including Harvard (19), Yale (15), Cornell (13), University of Chicago (8), University of Michigan (24), University of California (25), Albion College (1), Alma College (2), Kalamazoo College (1), the Michigan State Normal School at Ypsilanti (now Eastern Michigan University) (6), and Olivet College (3).

== Foundation, purpose, and etymology ==
The Thomasites arrived in the Philippines on August 21, 1901, to establish a new public school system, to teach basic education, and to train Filipino teachers, with English as the medium of instruction. Adeline Knapp, Thomasite and author of The Story of the Philippines, said:

Our nation has found herself confronted by a great problem dealing with a people who neither know nor understand the underlying principles of our civilization, yet who, for our mutual happiness and liberty, must be brought into accord with us ... the American genius, reasoning from its own experience in the past, seeks a solution of the problem, a bridging of the chasm, through the common schools.

The Philippines had a public school system since Queen Isabella II issued the Educational Decree of 1863 introducing wider public elementary education even to the tertiary level, and compulsory Spanish-language instruction. The Thomasites expanded and improved this public school system, substituting English as the medium of instruction.

The name Thomasite was derived from the United States Army Transport Thomas, which brought the educators to the Port of Manila. Although two groups of new American graduates had already arrived in the Philippines beforehand, the name Thomasite became the blanket term for all pioneer American teachers simply because Thomas had the largest contingent. Later batches of American teachers were also dubbed "Thomasites."

The Thomasites—365 males and 165 females—left Pier 12 of San Francisco on July 23, 1901, to sail via the Pacific Ocean to Southeast Asia. The U.S. government spent about $105,000 for the expedition (equivalent to $4,063,500 in 2025). More American teachers followed the Thomasites in 1902, making a total of about 1,074 stationed in the Philippines. On January 20, 1901, Act No. 74 formalized the creation of the Department of Public Instruction.

At the time, the Thomasites were offered $125 a month (equivalent to $4,838 in 2025), but once in the Philippines, salaries were often delayed and were usually paid in devalued Mexican pesos.

Although the Thomasites were the largest group of pioneers with the purpose of educating the Filipinos, they were not the first to be deployed by Washington, D.C. A few weeks before the arrival of Thomas, U.S. Army soldiers had already begun teaching Filipinos the English language, in effect laying the foundation of the modern Philippine public school system. The U.S. Army opened the Philippines' first public school in Corregidor Island, after Admiral George Dewey defeated the Spanish Pacific Squadron in the Battle of Manila Bay on May 1, 1898. A few weeks before the arrival of Thomas, another group composed of 48 American teachers also arrived in the Philippines, aboard the USAT Sheridan.

After President William McKinley's appointment of William Howard Taft as the head of a commission that would be responsible for continuing the educational work started by the U.S. Army, the Taft Commission passed Education Act No. 74 on January 21, 1901, which established the Department of Public Instruction (the Department of Education since 2001). The latter was then given the task of establishing a public school system throughout the Philippines. The Taft Commission also authorized the further deployment of 1,000 more educators from the United States to the Philippines.

== Assignments ==
After being quarantined for two days after their arrival on August 21, 1901, the Thomasites were finally able to disembark from the Thomas. They traveled from the customs house near Anda Circle then stayed at the walled city of Intramuros, Manila before being given initial provincial assignments which included Albay, Catanduanes, Camarines Norte, Camarines Sur, Sorsogon, Masbate, Samar, Zambales, Aparri, Jolo, Negros, Cebu, Dumaguete, Bulacan, Bataan, Batangas, Pangasinan, and Tarlac.

== Curriculum 1902–1935 ==
The Thomasites taught the following subjects: English, agriculture, reading, grammar, geography, mathematics, general courses, trade courses, housekeeping and household arts (sewing, crocheting, and cooking), manual trading, mechanical drawing, freehand drawing, and athletics (baseball, track and field, tennis, indoor baseball, and basketball).

== Legacy ==
The Thomasites built upon the Spanish school system created in 1863 and the earlier efforts of the U.S. Army. They built elementary schools and learning institutions such as the Philippine Normal School (formerly the Escuela Normal de Maestros in the Spanish period, now Philippine Normal University), the Philippine School of Arts and Trades (formerly the Escuela Central de Artes y Oficios de Manila, now Technological University of the Philippines) in 1901, Tarlac High School on September 21, 1902, and Tayabas High School (now Quezon National High School) on October 2, 1902.

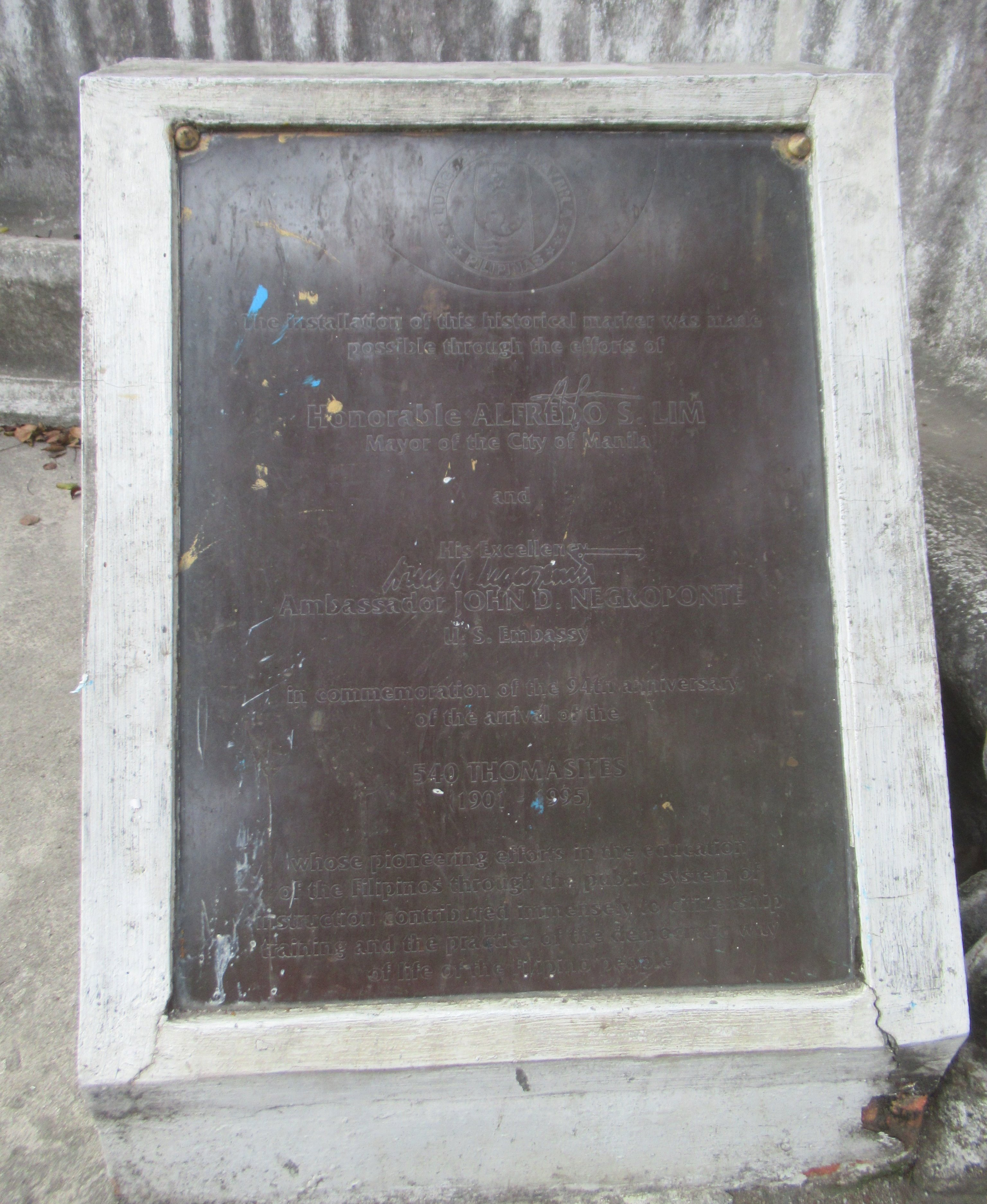
Thomasites memorial marker erected in 1995 at the Manila North Cemetery.

The Thomasites also reopened the Philippine Nautical School, which was originally established by the Board of Commerce of Manila in 1839 under Spain. About a hundred of the Thomasites permanently settled in the Philippines after finishing their teaching assignments, their descendants including educators and artists such as filmmaker Behn Cervantes. They transformed the Philippines into the third largest English-speaking nation in the world and became the precursors of the US Peace Corps Volunteers.

For their contributions to Philippine education, the Thomasites Centennial Project was established in cooperation with American Studies associations in the Philippines, the Philippine-American Educational Foundation, the United States Embassy in Manila, and other leading cultural and educational institutions in the Philippines.

The municipality of New Washington, Aklan was named after United States President George Washington, as a tribute to the Thomasites.

== List of some Thomasite teachers ==
- Harry Borgstadt, Division Superintendent, Occidental Negros, in Philippines for 14 years, eventually became an auditor for the US government in Washington D.C.
- Edwin Copeland, first dean of UP College of Agriculture and founder of the University of the Philippines at Los Baños.
- Austin Craig, an American expert on José Rizal
- A. V. H. Hartendorp, the founder and publisher of the Philippine Magazine
- Adeline Knapp
- Henry Nash, former member of Theodore Roosevelt's Rough Riders
- Philinda Rand
- Horace Brinsmade Silliman, founder of Silliman University
- Frank Russell White, founder of Tarlac Provincial High School (now Tarlac National High School), the oldest public high school in the Philippines
- Carter G. Woodson, African American historian
- Marius John, author of the "Philippine Saga" (1940) who was stationed at Baao, Camarines Sur in 1902
- Prescott F. Jernegan, Instructor in Philippine History and Government and author of A Short History of the Philippines: For Use in Philippine Schools (1905, revised 1914).

== See also ==
- History of the Philippines
- Americans in the Philippines
- Philippine English
- John Stuart Thomson
