= Tarlac National High School =

Public high school in Tarlac, Philippines

Location
- Main: San Roque, Tarlac City; Annex: San Miguel, Tarlac City; Philippines
- Coordinates: 15°28′55″N 120°35′21″E

Information
- Type: Public school
- Established: September 2, 1902
- Principal: Dr. Yolanda Gonzales (2022)
- Faculty: Around 300
- Grades: 7 to 12
- Enrollment: 7,268 (2014)
- Campus type: Urban
- Colors: Maroon and Yellow
- Newspaper: The Melting Pot; Ang Supling

Tarlac National High School (TNHS; Filipino: Pambansang Mataas na Paaralan ng Tarlac), formerly Tarlac High School (Filipino: Mataas na Paaralan ng Tarlac), is a public high school in Tarlac City, Philippines. Established on September 2, 1902, by American Thomasites, it is one of the oldest public high school system in the country. It is one of the largest secondary schools in the region with over 7,000 student population.

The current head of the school is Dr. Yolanda Gonzales. TNHS has two campuses within Tarlac City—the main campus, located along Macabulos Drive, San Roque, and the annex campus, located along MacArthur Highway in San Miguel.

The annex campus has been officially known as Jose V. Yap National High School since October 5, 2021 but locals still regard it as TNHS annex due to the fact that it has been an annex of TNHS for a long period of time.

== History ==
Tarlac National High School was founded on September 2, 1902, by the American Thomasites during the early years of the American period in the Philippines, becoming one of the oldest public high school in the country. Tarlac deputy division superintendent Frank Russell White served as its first principal.

The school celebrated its 110th anniversary with an alumni homecoming, as well as the construction of the Alumni Building, which will house the memorabilia from the school's history and alumni.

On October 28, 2015, a fire razed the original main building as well as the social hall of the school, prompting the creation of a resolution that sought the school to be recognized as a national historical site by the National Historical Commission in 2017.

The school celebrated its 120th anniversary in 2022. The school had a Mass as well as a video presentation shown to its students regarding the school's history.

== Notable alumni ==
- Carlos P. Romulo, Philippine representative to the United Nations, resident commissioner during the Commonwealth era. Served as the foreign affairs secretary on three separate occasions (1950–51, 1963–64, 1968–84), as well as education secretary in two separate occasions (1944–45, 1965–1967).
- Jose Roy Moncada, first senator from Tarlac. A town in the province was named after him.
- Onofre Corpuz, served as Education secretary (1965–68), and president of the University of the Philippines.
- Jorge Bocobo, lawyer and journalist who was the principal author of the Civil Code of the Philippines.
