= USAT Thomas =

Transport ship in service of the U.S. Army from 1898 to 1927

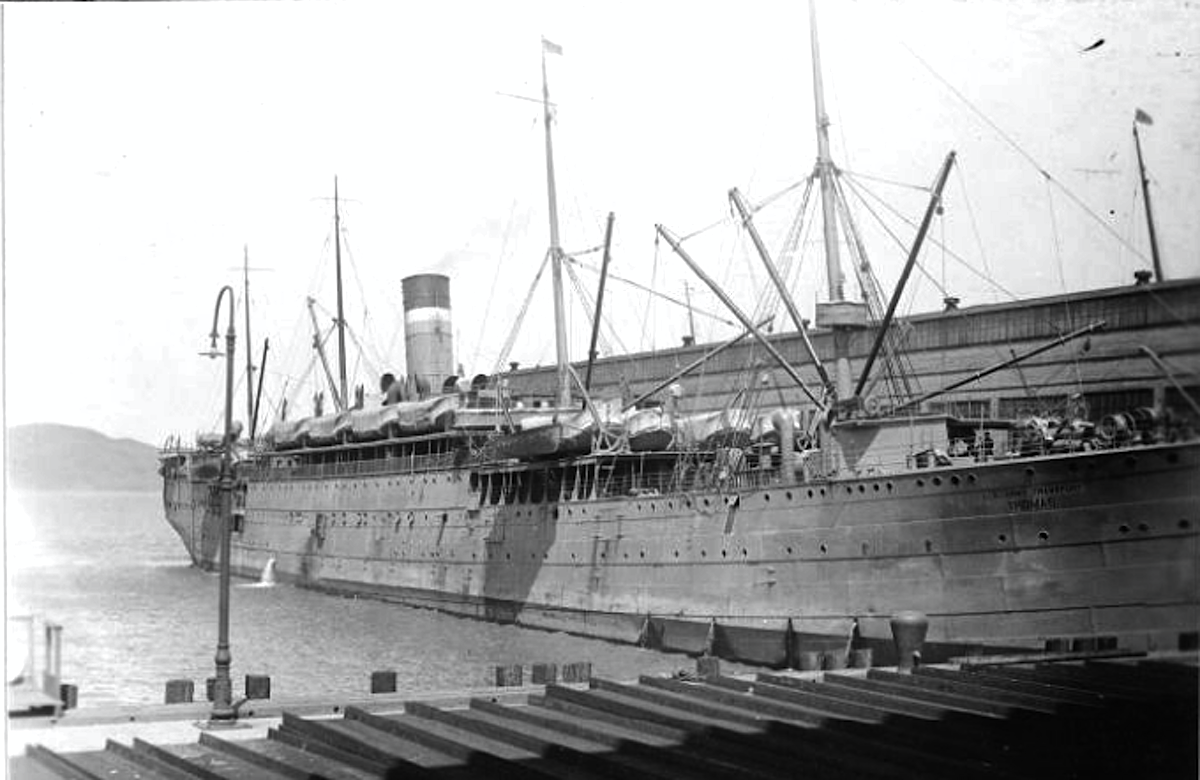
- U.S.A.T Thomas in dock at Fort Mason, California April 1920.

History
- Name: Persia (1894–97); Minnewaska (1897–1898); Thomas (1898–1929)
- Port of registry: Hamburg, Germany (Persia); London, U.K. (Minnewaska); United States (Army's Pacific service based in San Francisco)
- Builder: Harland & Wolff, Belfast
- Launched: 8 May 1894
- Completed: Delivered: 15 July 1894
- In service: May 1894
- Out of service: May 1929
- Identification: Persia: Code letters RKBG; Minnewaska: British Official Number 108287, code letters PWMV; Thomas: Signal (1928) GWBM (Note: U.S. Government vessels were not assigned official numbers.)
- Fate: Sold for scrap 14 May 1929

General characteristics
- Type: Passenger/cargo
- Tonnage: 1897: 5,796 GRT, 3,687 NRT (Persia); 1899: 5,713 GRT, 3,653 NRT (Minnewaska); 1902: 5,713 GRT, 3,653 NRT; 1928: 7,685 GRT, 5,644 NRT
- Displacement: 7,685 tons
- Length: 445.5 ft (135.8 m) (registry)
- Beam: 50 ft 2 in (15.29 m)
- Depth: 29.8 ft (9.1 m)
- Decks: 3
- Propulsion: Triple expansion engine, 499 nhp, twin screws
- Speed: 14 knots (26 km/h; 16 mph)

USAT Thomas was a United States Army transport ship purchased on 26 July 1898 for Spanish–American War service. Thomas served with the Army Transport Service (ATS) until retired in 1929.

The ship was built by Harland & Wolff, Belfast and launched as Persia in May 1894 for the Hamburg-American Packet Company (Hamburg-Amerikanische Packetfarhrt Aktien-Gesellschaft (HAPAG)) with service to New York. She was bought by the Atlantic Transport Line in 1897 because she was "practically a sister" to other Massachusetts class of ships already in service there. She was renamed Minnewaska by her new owners.

The United States Army Transport Thomas served in the Atlantic until fitted for Pacific service during 1899. At first the ship transported troops from New York to the Philippines via the Suez Canal with the first trip in November 1899 with 1,490 passengers. In 1900 the ship's capacity was officially given as 95 officers and 1,654 men. By 1901 Thomas was operating out of the ATS home port in San Francisco making routine trips to the Philippines.

In July 1901 the ship made the popular press and history outside its military support duties when it departed San Francisco with about 557 teachers sent by the Philippine Commission to establish an education system in the Philippines. Thomas transported the largest group of teachers with all, regardless of ship, subsequently being given the name Thomasites for the ship.

From 1919 until 1928 the ship was based in San Francisco making routine trips to the Philippines on a regular route normally involving stops in Honolulu, Guam, Nagasaki, Japan and after World War I briefly serving Vladivostok as a result of the Allied intervention in Siberia. In association with that service the ship was one of ten Army transports involved in evacuation of the Czechoslovak Legion from Vladivostok to Trieste, Italy.

The ship's last voyage for the service was in March 1928 after which Thomas was turned over to the United States Shipping Board for disposal and sold to the American Iron and Metal Company 14 May 1929 for scrapping at Oakland, California.

== Construction and characteristics ==
Persia was launched on 8 May 1894 as the second of two steamers, the first being Prussia launched 10 April 1894, built by Harland & Wolff for the Hamburg-American Packet Company at its Queens Island yard. The ships were steel, twin screw steamers intended for the North Atlantic service. About fifty cabin class passengers could be accommodated in steam heated, electric lit cabins and public rooms on the bridge deck. Emigrants in steerage were housed in twelve person rooms on three decks. The ship's cargo capacity included refrigerated space for carriage of fresh meat from the United States to Europe. Additionally the ship had the capability of transporting up to 380 head of live cattle. The ships were powered by two sets of triple expansion steam engines. The design was for a ship of 5,857 GRT. Under lists of refrigeration equipped ships in Lloyd's Register of 1897 the ship is rated with 30,342 cu ft (859.2 m^{3}) refrigerated cargo capacity in two compartments.

The 1902 U.S. register lists the ship as being 5,713 GRT, 3,653 NRT, 445.5 ft (135.8 m) registry length, 50.2 ft (15.3 m) beam and depth of 29.8 ft (9.1 m). (Note: Clay (p. 2183), gives draft as 29.8 feet, identical to the registry depth. Registers use depth of hold, a measurement different from "draft" which varies by load and location of measure. The two measurements are not equivalent. Clay may have mistaken registry "depth" for "draft" in his figures.) In the 1928 register, under Quartermaster Corps, United States Army, Thomas is listed as 7,685 GRT, 5,644 NRT assigned signal GWBM with a complement of 13 officers and 172 men and home station of San Francisco.

== Commercial service ==
Persia, a Hamburg-American Packet Company ship, code letters RKBG, 5,796 GRT, 3,687 NRT, with three decks was registered in Hamburg, Germany. The ship was sold in 1897 to the British Atlantic Transport Company, LTD.

Minnewaska, code letters PWMV, British Official Number 108287, was registered at 5,713 GRT, 3,653 NRT with port of registry London and owner as Atlantic Transport Company, LTD. (Note: Lloyd's Register dated 1899 shows the sale of the ship to the United States Government. The ship was so briefly with the company and under British registry that data is incomplete for Minnewaska as it is overprint of Persia in the 1898 register.) The ship was in service on the line's London—New York service making three round trips between March and May 1898 before sale.

== U.S.A.T. Thomas ==
The Quartermaster Corps had chartered a large number of vessels during the Spanish-American War but released them as soon as possible after the war. By 30 June 1899 none remained in the Atlantic fleet. A number, including suitable troop transports, were purchased. Minnewaska was one of six Atlantic Transport Line ships obtained for service as transports during the war and was assigned to Army Transport Service's Atlantic fleet. The ship was purchased on 26 July 1898 for $660,000, renamed Thomas after General George Henry Thomas, a hero of the American Civil War battle of Chickamauga. The ship was engaged in transport between New York, Cuba and Puerto Rico until 12 July 1899.

During 1899 Thomas was fitted for Pacific service. The refitting was done by William Cramp & Sons Ship & Engine Company of Philadelphia under a contract for $239,500. The ship arrived in New York from Cramp and Sons 20 October 1899 and was placed in dry dock for hull painting in final preparation to transport troops to the Philippines transiting the Suez Canal. On 4 November 1899 Thomas sailed from New York bound for Manila via the Suez Canal with 1,490 passengers.

While preparing for that voyage the ship was described while in dry dock. Troops were quartered in spaces with steel pipe berths in frames of three berths. Spaces forward on the lower deck had 786 berths and the 'tween deck had an additional 807 berths. Officers quarters were on the promenade deck which also had a smoking room and lounge. Quarters for ship's officers were above on the bridge deck. There was a hospital with special ventilation for contagious diseases also located on the bridge deck. Soldiers had access to a writing room. Located on the main deck were an ice plant with two tons a day capacity, a condenser with 10,000 US gallons (38,000 L) per day capacity, a carbonating machine for soda water, bakery, steam laundry and cold storage for meat. Thomas could accommodate 100 officers, 1,200 men and 1,000 horses, and also had refrigerated capacity for shipping 1,000 pounds (450 kg) of meat. (Note: These numbers appear to be rounded as the official capacities given in the Quartermaster Corps, U.S. Army 1900 report differ and are more specific. These numbers match those in other popular press reports on the ship.)

In Fiscal Year 1900 (31 July 1899—30 June 1900) the ship was among the nineteen large transports of the U.S. Army Quartermaster's Department and listed as one of four of those transports refitting for the Service's Pacific fleet. Thomas is shown in the list of thirteen Atlantic fleet ships as having the largest troop transport capacity with 95 officers and 1,654 men. Before June 30, 1900, transports Thomas, Meade and Logan had been transferred bringing the Pacific fleet's total large transports to eight, generally with as much troop transport capacity or larger than that of Thomas.

In 1901 the Army Transport Service was engaged in troop movements to China in response to the Boxer Rebellion. The first troops were sent from the Philippines with later contingents from San Francisco. Thomas was involved in transport from San Francisco with parts of the 5th and 8th Infantry Regiments. Expiration of service on 30 June 1901 for the volunteer army in the Philippines required their transport to the United States without seriously interrupting the transports regular schedule by adding sailings to the schedule. Replacements were delayed so the transport of the volunteers was not begun until December 1900. On 16 March 1901 Thomas sailed with 1,918 troops of the 28th and 35th Infantry Regiments returning them to the United States the middle of April. A second such voyage departing the Philippines 27 May returned 1,661 troops of the 47th, 49th and 38th Infantry Regiments on 26 June 1901. (Note: Note the regiments mentioned are Philippine volunteers serving in the Philippine–American War. Those regiments may or may not be directly related to the regular army regiments of later wars.)

On 23 July 1901 Thomas departed San Francisco with 357 male teachers, about 200 female teachers, a few wives and about 30 children sent by the Philippine Commission to establish an education system extending beyond the existing Spanish system. (Note: An earlier, similar project, had been implemented in Cuba and Puerto Rico.) The group, the largest contingent of teachers for the Philippines, were termed "Thomasites" taking the name of the ship. The group was recruited by David Barrows, director of the colonial education system, and included a mix from well known professors at high-ranking universities to applicants seeking employment in teaching. With a stop in Honolulu the ship reached Manila on 21 August 1901. After being vaccinated aboard ship the group landed and took positions throughout the islands.

The ship's routine ATS Pacific fleet service between San Francisco and Manila is reflected in figures for the fiscal year 1905. The fleet's San Francisco departures for Manila via Honolulu and Guam changed during the fiscal year from the last day of each month to the fifth day of each month, except when the fifth falls on Sunday when sailing is on the sixth, to enable mustering a payment of troops before sailings. Sailings from Manila to San Francisco via Nagasaki, Japan, and Honolulu were on the fifteenth, except when the date fell on Sunday so that sailing was on the sixteenth. Thomas, despite being withdrawn during the year for repairs, is shown as making three outward bound, San Francisco to Manila, trips during the fiscal year. Departure on 1 September 1904 was with 23 officers, 330 enlisted, 127 civilians for a total of 480 passengers. The ship departed Manila for San Francisco 15 October 1904 with 38 officers, 378 enlisted, 205 civilians for a total of 621 passengers. On 31 December 1904 the ship departed for Manila with 22 officers, 905 enlisted, 96 civilians for a total of 1,023 passengers. Return, departing 15 February 1905, was with 17 officers, 606 enlisted, 263 civilians for a total of 886 passengers. The ship's third and last voyage of the fiscal year departed San Francisco on 31 March 1905 with 46 officers, 754 enlisted, 87 civilians for a total of 887 passengers. On 20 May 1905 Thomas departed Manila with 81 officers, 1,064 enlisted, 284 civilians for a total of 1,429 passengers.

Thomas completed a general overhaul and returned to service on 6 November 1911. Potential emergency use for transporting an expeditionary force to China interrupted the regular schedule for Thomas and Sherman with both seeing a month delay in schedule for December 1911 and January 1912. Sheridan was activated to fill a gap in January sailings to Manila and held about a month in the Philippines before returning to San Francisco with the 14th Cavalry. Logan transported the expeditionary force of 544 from Manila to Chinwangtao, China departing Manila 12 January 1912.

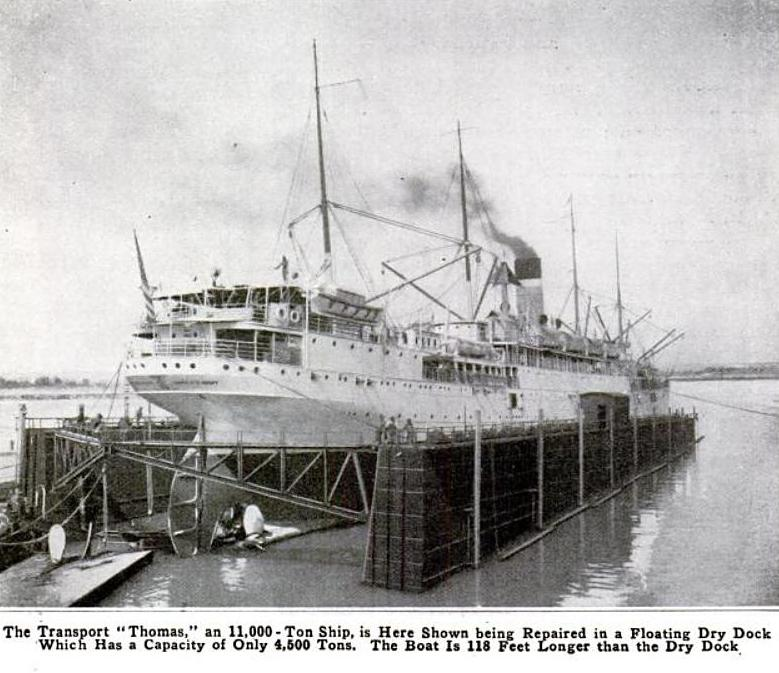
Thomas in drydock to repair a broken propeller.

In early 1916, the Thomas broke its propeller on a voyage from San Francisco to Manila and put into Honolulu for repairs. The floating dry dock that was available had a capacity of only 4,500 tons, while the Thomas was an 11,000-ton vessel, and 118 feet longer than the dry dock. Engineers allowed the bow to extend beyond the front of the dry dock granting them access to stern which was lifted out of the water, allowing them to replace the damaged propeller.

From 1919 until 1928 Thomas was based at the Army Transport Service Pacific terminal and home port at Fort Mason, California. Though in Pacific service with large troop capacity the ship did not see service in the war zone during World War I due to slow speed and lack of bunker capacity. Transports in the Atlantic were required to make a round trip without bunkering in Europe where coal was critically short. The ship's Pacific routes had intermediate coaling stations available. The ATS Pacific transports in 1919 were engaged in monthly sailings to Honolulu, Vladivostok, Nagasaki, Manila, Guam and return via Honolulu.

The ship did see service after the war in events related to the war. The Allied intervention in Siberia was the cause of the ATS ships, including Thomas, to begin voyages to Vladivostok in support of the American Expeditionary Force, Siberia. Thomas was active in withdrawal of troops from Siberia. For example, the 27th Infantry Regiment departed Vladivostok 10 March 1920 aboard Thomas arriving at Manila on 17 March 1920. Between 10 June and 22 September 1920 Thomas was one of ten Army transports evacuating members of the Czechoslovak Legion from Vladivostok and transporting them to Trieste, Italy.

In October 1922 the Thomas took aboard passengers and crew of the Los Angeles Steamship Company liner SS City of Honolulu, which had caught fire about 670 miles northeast of the Hawaiian Islands, and landed them at San Pedro, California. From 5 to 30 September 1923 Thomas was one of three Army transports involved in earthquake relief operations, Yokohama, Japan.

== Retirement ==
In March 1928 Thomas made her final voyage for the Army Transport Service and was turned over to the United States Shipping Board for disposal and sold to the American Iron and Metal Company 14 May 1929 for scrapping at Oakland, California. She was the last of the more than 50 transports acquired by the U.S. Government in 1898 to remain in service. Passengers during the ship's Army service were roughly estimated to be 40,000 officers, 200,000 men and civilians including prominent military and government officials of which none were lost to accident.
