= A. V. H. Hartendorp =

American writer

Abraham Van Heyningen Hartendorp (1893–1975), commonly known as A.V.H. Hartendorp or A.V. Hartendorp, was an American writer, editor, Thomasite, and Filipinologist. He was the founder and publisher of the Philippine Magazine, a magazine formerly known as Philippine Education Magazine when it was still a publication intended for public school teachers in 1904. When Hantendorp bought the magazine in 1924, he officially changed its name into Philippine Magazine and became the "most prestigious outlet" for aspiring writers in the Philippines. In 1930, Hartendorp dedicated the magazine to "full recording of all phases of the present cultural development of the Philippines" up to "the Philippine Renaissance." Hartendorp catered the Philippine Magazine to an "urban-based audience of educated elites", particularly "schoolteachers, employees of the government, professionals, and university intellectuals". Hartendorp was also a former editor of The Manila Times newspaper.

Hartendorp was interned by the Japanese at Santo Tomas Internment Camp for 37 months during World War II. His book, The Japanese Occupation of the Philippines, published in 1967 is probably the most lengthy and thorough description of the experiences of American civilian prisoners of Japan in the Philippines.
