= SS Kroonland =

American steamship (1902–1927)

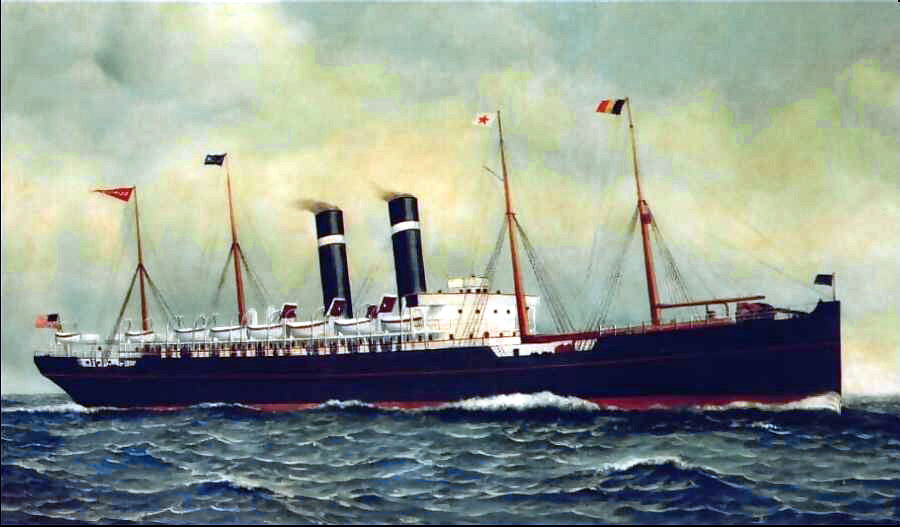
- SS Kroonland, painted in 1903 by Antonio Jacobsen (1850–1921)

History

United States
- Name: SS Kroonland
- Owner: International Mercantile Marine
- Operator: 1902–1914: Red Star Line; 1914–1915: American Line; 1915: Panama Pacific Line; 1915–1917: American Line
- Port of registry: 1902–1908: New York; 1908–1911: Antwerp; 1911–1918: New York
- Route: 1902–1914: New York – Antwerp; 1914–1915: New York – Liverpool; 1915: New York – Panama – San Francisco; 1915–1917: New York – Liverpool
- Builder: William Cramp & Sons; Philadelphia
- Yard number: 311
- Launched: 20 February 1902
- Sponsored by: Mrs. Rodman Griscom
- Fate: Chartered to USA

United States
- Name: USS Kroonland (ID-1541)
- Acquired: 22 April 1918
- Commissioned: 22 April 1918
- Decommissioned: 1 October 1919
- Stricken: 1 October 1919
- Fate: Returned to International Mercantile Marine

United States
- Name: SS Kroonland
- Acquired: Returned by USSB, 1 October 1919
- Owner: International Mercantile Marine
- Operator: 1920–1923: Red Star Line; 1923: American Line; 1923–1925: Panama Pacific Line; 1925–1926: American Line
- Port of registry: New York
- Route: 1920–1923: New York – Antwerp; 1923: New York – Hamburg; 1923–1925: New York – Panama – San Francisco; 1925–1926: New York – Miami
- Fate: Scrapped, 1927

General characteristics (as built)
- Tonnage: 12,760 GRT
- Length: 560 ft (170.7 m) pp; 580 ft (176.8 m) oa
- Beam: 60 ft (18.3 m)
- Depth: 42 ft (12.8 m) molded depth
- Propulsion: 2 × triple-expansion steam engines 10,200 hp (7,600 kW); twin screw propellers
- Speed: 17 knots (31 km/h; 20 mph)
- Capacity: Passengers: 342 first-class; 194 second-class; 626 third-class; Cargo:11,000 long tons (11,000 t)
- Crew: 257
- Notes: Sister ship of Finland; Near sister ship of Vaderland, Zeeland

General characteristics (as USS Kroonland)
- Displacement: 22,000 long tons (22,000 t)
- Draft: 31 ft 1 in (9.47 m)
- Speed: 16 knots (30 km/h; 18 mph)
- Troops: 3,300; 3,800 after Armistice
- Complement: 414
- Armament: 4 × 4-inch (100 mm) guns; 2 × 1-pounder gun; 2 × Lewis machine guns

General characteristics (postwar civilian service)
- Tonnage: 12,241 GRT
- Capacity: Passengers, 1919: 242 first-class; 310 second-class; 876 third-class; Passengers, 1925: 500 first-class

SS Kroonland was an ocean liner for International Mercantile Marine (IMM) from her launch in 1902 until she was scrapped in 1927. Kroonland was the sister ship of Finland and a near sister ship of Vaderland and Zeeland of the same company. Kroonland sailed for IMM's Red Star Line for 15 years, and also sailed for IMM's American Line and Panama Pacific Line. During World War I, the ship served as United States Army transport USAT Kroonland through April 1918, and as the Navy auxiliary USS Kroonland (ID-1541) from April 1918 to October 1919.

Announced by the Red Star Line in 1899, Kroonland was completed in 1902 by William Cramp & Sons of Philadelphia. When launched, she was the largest steamship ever built in the United States. Kroonland sailed from New York City to Antwerp on her maiden voyage in June 1902, beginning service on the route she would sail for the next twelve years. According to The New York Times, Kroonland became the first ship to issue a wireless distress call at sea when she radioed for help during a storm in 1903. In another radio first, Kroonland heard the "first real broadcast of history" in December 1906. Kroonland was one of ten ships that came to the aid of the burning liner Volturno in the mid-Atlantic in October 1913. Despite stormy seas, Kroonland was able to take aboard 89 survivors, for which captain and crew received accolades that included U.S. Congressional Gold Medals.

When the outbreak of World War I in August 1914 disrupted service to Belgium, Kroonland shifted to alternate routes. On a trip to the Mediterranean in October 1914, Kroonland was detained by British authorities at Gibraltar, and part of her cargo was confiscated amidst diplomatic wrangling between the then-neutral United States and the United Kingdom. During a chartered circumnavigation of South America in February 1915, Kroonland became the largest passenger ship to have transited the Panama Canal during that time. Kroonland was placed in New York – Panama Canal – San Francisco service until a landslide temporarily closed the canal to navigation. Returned to transatlantic service, Kroonland was one of the first U.S. ships armed by the Navy for defense against German submarine attacks. In May 1917 Kroonland was struck by a torpedo, which failed to detonate and only slightly damaged the ship.

After the United States entered World War I, Kroonland served as a troopship for the U.S. Army and Navy. She made six trips carrying troops to France before the Armistice and eight voyages after, transporting nearly 38,000 troops in total. Returned to IMM in late 1919, Kroonland was scorched in a shipyard fire in January 1920 while she was being refitted for passenger service. The liner resumed North Atlantic service in April, remaining there until returning to New York – San Francisco service in 1923. Kroonland inaugurated IMM's winter New York – Miami service from December 1925 to March 1926, but was laid up in Hoboken, New Jersey, when IMM did not resume the Miami service the following year. The ship was sold and scrapped at Genoa in 1927.

== Design and construction ==
In July 1899, the Red Star Line announced plans for the construction of four large ocean liners. Two ships, Kroonland and Finland, were to be built at William Cramp & Sons in Philadelphia, and the others, Vaderland and Zeeland, at John Brown & Company of Clydebank in Scotland. By April 1901, the two Scottish-built ships were completed and in service for Red Star, with the construction of the American pair well underway.

Kroonland and the virtually identical Finland, at 12,760 gross register tons (GRT) each, were slightly larger than Vaderland and Zeeland. The American pair were the largest steamships built in the United States at the time of their launch, and were the highest tonnage civilian ships ever built by William Cramp. Kroonland was 560 feet (170.7 m) long (pp) and 60-foot (18.3 m) abeam, with a molded depth of 42 feet (12.8 m). Her hull was steel and nearly all the rivets were set with pneumatic rivet guns.

Kroonland was propelled at up to 17 knots (31 km/h) by twin triple-expansion steam engines. The engines were each rated at 5,100 indicated horsepower (3,800 kW) and had cylinders of 32.5 inches (83 cm), 54 inches (140 cm), and 89.5 inches (227 cm) with a 42-inch (110 cm) stroke. There were nine single-ended coal-fired Scotch boilers with a heating area of 22,400 square feet (2,080 m^{2}), a grate area of 643 square feet (59.7 m^{2}), and an operating pressure of 170 pounds per square inch (1,200 kPa). Kroonland had eleven watertight compartments with reinforced bulkheads, and was designed to remain afloat with up to two compartments flooded. Kroonland's coal bunkers surrounded the boilers, to offer limited protection in case the ship was used in wartime.

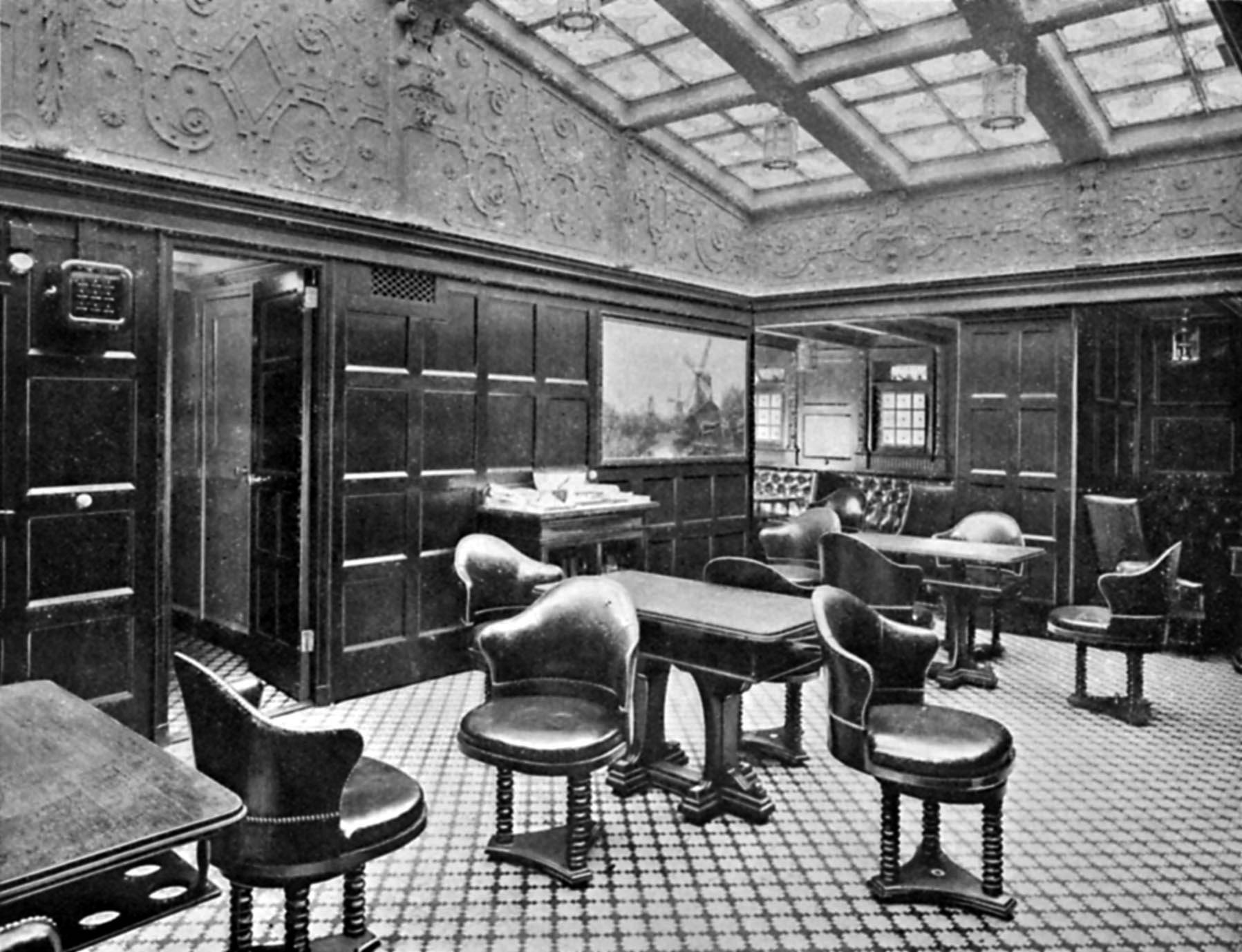
The first-class passengers smoking room on SS Kroonland, c. 1909

The area below the main deck could carry up to 11,000 long tons (11,000 t) of freight and stores. Kroonland's water tanks could carry 200 long tons (200 t) of fresh water. Refrigerated storage was provided for meats and other perishables.

Third-class passenger accommodations were located on the main deck: three compartments for men located forward, and a single compartment for families at the rear. The family compartment had state rooms containing either two, four, or six bunks. All compartments had well-lighted dining areas and wide hallways that led to lavatories and sanitary facilities on the upper deck.

The upper deck housed facilities for officers and first- and second-class passengers. A long forecastle contained the accommodations for the crew and petty officers, as well as a hospital and the third-class lavatories. First-class staterooms for 106 passengers were located close to the middle of the ship. To their rear, between the funnels, was the first-class passenger dining room, spanning the width of the ship. With seating for 208, it featured mahogany furniture and satinwood paneling with inlays, and a glass skylight ceiling that extended up through two decks. Beyond this area were the galleys, sculleries, and pantries that served all passenger classes. Moving further aft, the second-class passenger dining room, which could accommodate 120 diners, was next. It, too, spanned the width of the ship and featured mahogany furniture, but was paneled with tapestry upon a cream-colored ground. Beyond the dining area were cabins for 76 second-class passengers.

A 220-foot-long (67 m) bridge deck amidships contained state rooms for another 204 first-class and 120 second-class passengers. In the rear was a deck house that contained a social room for third-class passengers. A promenade deck was located above and was permanently enclosed by a boat deck, where Kroonland's 20 steel lifeboats were stowed. The promenade deck housed the library and smoking room for first-class passengers.

Kroonland was launched on the afternoon of 20 February 1902 in a small, informal ceremony. Mrs. Rodman Griscom christened the ship, but Kroonland did not budge on the launching way; cold weather had frozen the tallow used to grease the timbers. Hydraulic jacks eventually freed the ship for her plunge into the Delaware River.

== Red Star Line service, 1902–1914 ==
Kroonland sailed on her maiden voyage from New York to Antwerp on 28 June 1902. Kroonland remained on New York – Antwerp service for the next twelve years. In these early years of service, she was involved in two radio firsts. After the steering gear failed 130 nautical miles (240 km) west of Fastnet Rock during a moderate gale in early December 1903, the ship's crew was able to communicate their predicament via the Marconi wireless system, becoming, according to one contemporary news account, the first ship in distress ever to use wireless. Kroonland put in at Queenstown, Ireland, for repairs, and transferred her passengers and freight to ships of the White Star Line, another IMM subsidiary. (Note: Kroonland's first- and second-class passengers were transferred to RMS Teutonic and third-class passengers were transferred to another, unreported steamer. See: "Get money at sea". Chicago Daily Tribune. 10 December 1903. p. 1. Cargo was transferred onto Bovic. Freight customers ended up paying twice for the shipments because Red Star and White Star, even though both subsidiaries of International Mercantile Marine, were separate companies. See: "Made consignees pay twice for freight" (PDF). The New York Times. 26 January 1904. p. 16. Archived (PDF) from the original on 5 May 2024.) The other radio first came on 24 December 1906, when the ship's wireless operator heard—rather than the expected dots and dashes of morse code—the voice of a woman singing. The singing was followed by a recording of Handel's "Largo", a poetry reading, and more music played from phonographs. The steamer was on the receiving end of what journalist and author Robert St. John called the "first real broadcast of history", originated by early radio pioneer Reginald Fessenden from Brant Rock in Massachusetts.

During her time on the New York – Antwerp route, Kroonland was frequently battered by the storms that were typical in the North Atlantic. In November 1904, a Brussels news agency reported a rumor that the ship had foundered in a mid-ocean storm. The report—proved false when Kroonland safely docked in New York—received wide coverage in the American press. While in a heavy December gale, the ship was struck by what contemporary news accounts referred to as a "tidal wave" as high as the tops of her funnels. The wave crashed over the deck, and brought the ship to a standstill. A Belgian passenger's leg was broken when he was thrown into a wall, and a crewman on watch in the crow's nest was sent tumbling to the deck 40 feet (12 m) below with only minor injuries.

In another December gale in 1907, one of the two propeller shafts on Kroonland broke while the liner was off the Isles of Scilly. Using the lone remaining propeller, the liner was able to make her way back to Southampton, where two tugs brought her into port. Passengers were transferred to Majestic to continue their transit to New York, while Kroonland entered drydock at Southampton. Fitted with a new shaft, she sailed—without passengers and cargo—for New York, where she arrived on 2 January 1908. In February 1910, severe winter storms on the North Atlantic extended one of Kroonland's westbound trips, delaying her arrival in New York by three days. In May, Kroonland broke another propeller shaft, and again headed to Southampton for repairs.

Not all of the ship's mishaps were storm-related. In late April 1911, Kroonland hit the breakwater in Dover Harbour, disabling the steering gear and delaying the ship by a day. On 8 January 1913, Kroonland ran aground in Ambrose Channel during a heavy fog while outbound from New York. It took more than six hours for tugs to free the liner from the soft mud.

The Red Star Line changed Kroonland from American to Belgian registry on 6 November 1908 in Antwerp. One reason given for the change was to allow Red Star to hire non-American crews at lower cost. She made her maiden voyage under the Belgian flag the next day. In May 1911, Kroonland's crew, acting on rumors of an impending British mariner's strike, refused to sign on for the ship's next voyage, forcing Red Star to hire a replacement crew. (Note: Typically, crew members had no contracts and had to "sign on" after each voyage. See: Coons and Varias, p. 125.)

International Mercantile Marine submitted a bid for a ten-year contract for Kroonland and Finland to carry U.S. mail between New York and San Francisco after the opening of the Panama Canal. By law, only U.S.-flagged ships could carry U.S. mail under contract. It was also anticipated that U.S.-flagged vessels would receive preferential treatment for canal tolls. In a short ceremony aboard the liner in New York Harbor on 27 December 1911, the Belgian flag was lowered and the American flag was raised to the playing of "The Star-Spangled Banner" by the steamer's band, shortly before she sailed for Antwerp.

=== Volturno rescue ===
At about 06:00 on 9 October 1913, Volturno, a Royal Line ship under charter to the Uranium Line, caught fire in a gale on the North Atlantic. The crew fought the fire for about two hours, but, realizing the severity of the fire and the limited options for dousing it in the high seas, Captain Francis Inch of Volturno had his wireless operator send out SOS signals. The westbound Kroonland, already beyond Volturno's location, turned east to aid the burning liner. In the meantime, several of Volturno's lifeboats with women and children aboard were launched with tragic results: all those aboard the lifeboats were killed as the boats capsized or were smashed by the hull of the heaving ship.

In all, ten ships heeded the distress calls, arriving throughout the day and into the next. Kroonland arrived at about 17:00, and by 20:00 had launched a lifeboat with a volunteer crew. The boat was unable to get close to the burning liner. Kroonland's lifeboat returned at 22:30 with an exhausted crew and the one person who had dared to brave the jump into the stormy water. Captain J. C. Barr of Carmania, the first ship to arrive, took command of the rescue effort. Barr had the vessels form a "battle line" of sorts and slowly circle the burning ship, while his ship kept a searchlight on Volturno and another sweeping the ring of rescue ships to help them avoid collisions. Despite Carmania's efforts, Kroonland and the French Line steamer La Touraine almost collided, coming—according to one passenger—within 15 feet (4.6 m) of impact.

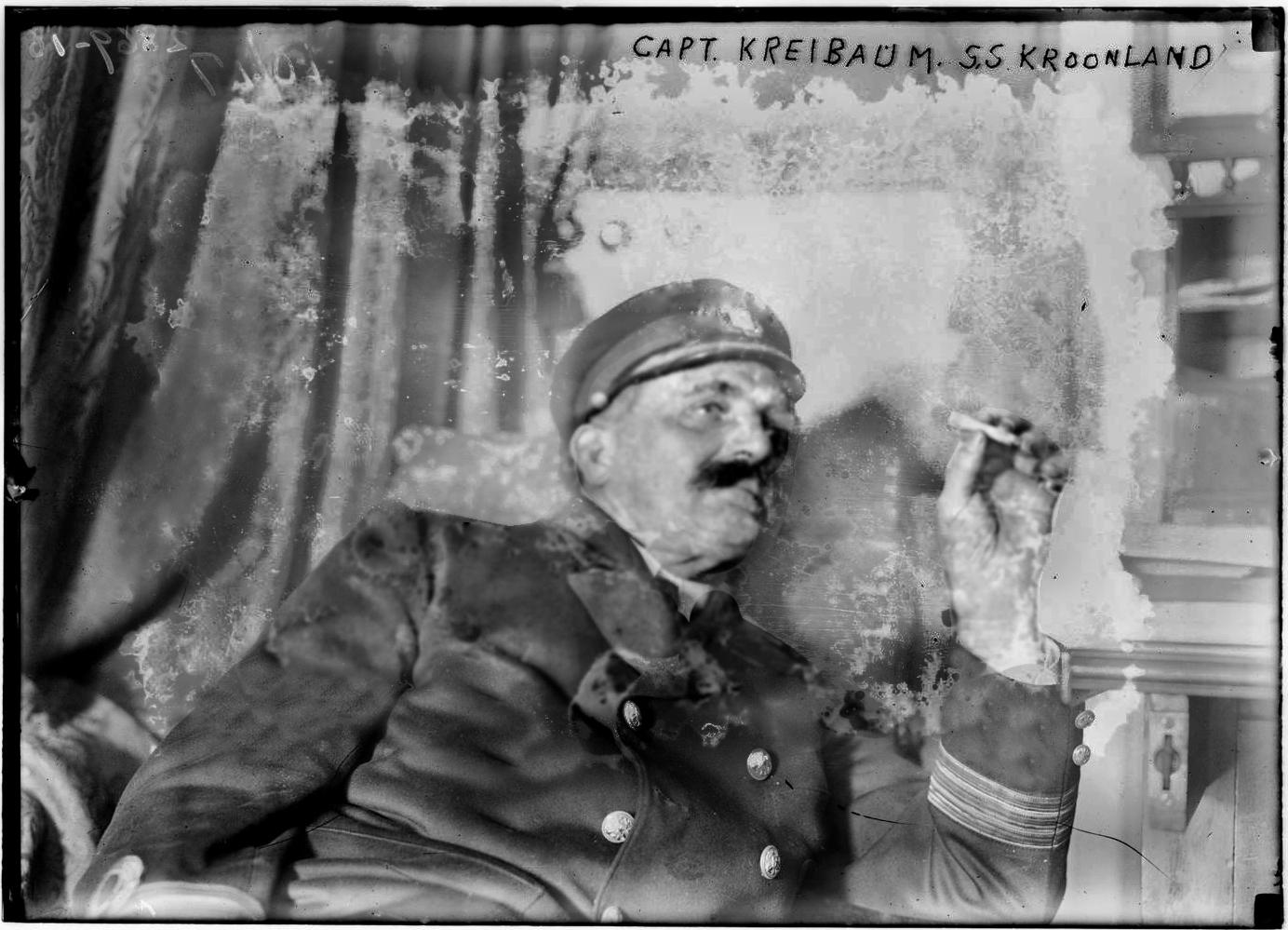
For his part in helping to rescue victims of the Volturno fire, Kroonland's captain, Paul H. Kreibohm, was made a Chevalier of the Order of the Crown, and received a gold watch, a Congressional Gold Medal, and a Silver Sea Gallantry Medal.

Kroonland's lifeboat, manned by a fresh crew, headed back out and returned with 13 steerage passengers. On board Volturno, the crew and some of the male passengers, unable to extinguish the fire, were at least able to keep it from spreading to the aft cargo holds, over which the others on board were gathered. Shortly before dawn, a large explosion—probably of her boilers—rocked Volturno, and the rescuers felt that the ship, which had not been in imminent danger of sinking up to this point, might founder at any time. The tanker Narragansett turned on her pumps and sprayed lubricating oil on the sea to help calm the surface. The combined effect of the oil and the lessening of the storm allowed many more lifeboats to be sent to Volturno's aid. Kroonland launched two more boats herself and saved 75 more, including Captain Inch, the last person to leave the stricken ship. In all, some 520 passengers and crew were rescued by the ten ships—89 on Kroonland alone. The loss of life was limited to around 130, mostly women and children from the early lifeboat launchings.

With all boats recovered by 09:00, the liners resumed their original courses. Kroonland turned west and continued on to the United States, hampered by a cracked crankshaft that slowed her to 12 knots (22 km/h). During her slow passage to New York, Kroonland's cabin passengers drafted a resolution honoring Captain Kreibohm and the crew for their actions during the rescue, and raised $700 for the benefit of the Volturno survivors. Kroonland finally docked in New York on 16 October.

The crew, like those of the other nine ships involved, received many accolades for its rescue efforts. After sending the ship a congratulatory telegram at the time of the rescue, King Albert of Belgium made Capt. Kreibohm a Chevalier (Knight) of the Order of the Crown in January 1914. At the same time, the Belgian government awarded its Third Class Civic Cross to Kroonland's third officer, and First Class Civic Medals to six crewmen and a steward. In March, King George V of the United Kingdom, on recommendation of the Board of Trade, awarded 39 of the ship's crew the Silver Sea Gallantry Medal, along with a £3 award. Crewmen from all ten ships received Sea Gallantry Medals, but no other ship had more medals awarded than Kroonland. Later in March, the United States Congress honored Kreibohm with a gold watch, Kroonland's officers—including Kreibohm—with Congressional Gold Medals, (Note: It is not entirely clear from contemporary sources whether Kreibohm actually received both a watch and a gold medal. Stathis (p. 17) indicates Kreibohm did, in fact, receive a gold medal.) and other crewmen with five silver and 25 bronze medals. In April, the Life Saving Benevolent Association of New York awarded its Life Saving Medal to Kreibohm, four officers, and 35 crewmen. In June 1916, Kreibohm was presented with the American Cross of Honor by Congressman Henry Bruckner.

Kroonland resumed her normal New York – Antwerp service until 11 August 1914, when she arrived at New York with passengers that had narrowly escaped the hostilities beginning to engulf the European continent.

=== Notable passengers ===
During her pre-war New York – Antwerp sailings, Kroonland carried some notable and interesting passengers. On 1 August 1904, one of the ship's passengers arrived in New York as somewhat of a mystery woman. She recounted that she had gone out for dinner in Antwerp and awakened to find herself at sea with only the white silk evening gown she was wearing. Having no money or luggage, she was barred from entering the United States and was compelled to remain on board the ship. After her predicament was reported in The New York Times, she received letters and telegrams that included marriage proposals. Her background story and a letter of credit eventually verified her identity, but she was deported after a New York doctor pronounced her insane. Later the same month The New York Times reported on first-class passengers' complaints over privileges for their dogs and the conditions in the kennel aboard the liner. One passenger was determined to have her dog in her state room, and after others joined her in removing canine companions from the kennel, Kroonland's crew took all the dogs back to the kennel. Many of the dog owners refused to speak to the others involved for the duration of the voyage.

On 27 May 1905, American author Molly Elliot Seawell sailed for Europe on Kroonland on a day when six liners, with over 1,500 passengers, departed New York. In October, Helen Taft returned from Europe on Kroonland and was met by her husband, Secretary of War William Howard Taft. The next August, Henry Yates Satterlee, the first Episcopal Bishop of Washington, returned on Kroonland from a six-week tour of cathedrals of Europe, during which he noted both good and bad design elements of cathedrals in preparation for the building of the Washington National Cathedral. Also returning on the same voyage were Admiral Charles Sperry and Lieutenant Daniel W. Wurtsbaugh of the U.S. Navy, and Brigadier General Robert O'Reilly, the Surgeon General of the U.S. Army; all were American delegates to the Second Geneva Convention. It was not the first trip on Kroonland for either Satterlee and O'Reilly. Satterlee had traveled on the liner the previous May to visit the spa town of Bad Nauheim in Hesse; O'Reilly had been on the November 1904 trip in which Kroonland had been reported as sunk.

Kroonland was the scene of an attempted murder-suicide in October 1908. Two acquaintances in steerage had an argument over a young female second-class passenger that both men knew. One man threw a knife at the other—only slightly wounding him—and then fled and jumped over the railing into the English Channel near Dover. U.S. Senator Benjamin Tillman and his wife were aboard the liner at the time and saw the young man jump overboard. Although the ship lowered a boat to look for him, no trace of him was found, and he was presumed drowned.

American actresses Kitty Cheatham and Isabel Irving—each married to a different man named "W. H. Thompson"—traveled on Kroonland in May 1910. Alerted to each other's presence when mail addressed to "Mrs. W. H. Thompson" was confused, the actresses—old friends, having both worked in the theatre company of Augustin Daly—shared a state room for the voyage. Later that month, the ship was the official "World Missionary Conference Steamship" for delegates and representatives on their way to the World Missionary Conference in Edinburgh, Scotland. Honda Yoitsu, said to be the only Japanese Methodist Episcopal bishop, was among those on the liner when she sailed on 31 May. News accounts reported on some of the unusual activities aboard Kroonland during this trip. Among them were morning devotional services held daily in the ship's dining room, and the spontaneous singing of hymns on deck every evening.

Kroonland was tangentially involved in a more sinister affair in July 1910. American physician Hawley Crippen and his lover, Ethel La Neve, had fled England after the circumstances around his wife's death were questioned. After a body was found in the basement of Crippen's North London residence, Scotland Yard Chief Inspector Walter Dew sought the couple for murder charges. One theory had the couple sailing from Dover on Kroonland, but when inspected in New York on arrival, Crippen and Le Neve were not to be found. The fleeing couple had instead sailed from Antwerp on the Canadian Pacific liner Montrose. Crippen, identified during Montrose's crossing, was arrested, convicted of his wife's murder, and hanged; La Neve was acquitted.

The American novelist Theodore Dreiser, returning from an extended European tour in April 1912, briefly considered returning on RMS Titanic, but instead sailed two days later on the American-flagged—and less expensive—Kroonland. Dreiser recounted the gloomy mood of Kroonland's passengers after hearing the news of Titanic's sinking, observing that the "terror of the sea had come swiftly and directly home to all". On Kroonland's next return trip to New York, Horst von der Goltz, a self-described German secret agent, eluded German authorities by working as a steward in steerage aboard the liner.

== American Line service, 1914–1915 ==
With the German invasion of Belgium in early August 1914, Kroonland was switched to New York – Liverpool service. After two circuits on that route, IMM announced that the ship would be moved to service in the Mediterranean to attract business to offset that lost because of the war. Sailing from New York on 15 October for Gibraltar, Naples, and Piraeus, Kroonland became what IMM called the first large, American-flagged steamer "to engage in trade with the far corners of the Mediterranean". Along with passengers, the ship carried a cargo of rubber and 1,500 long tons (1,520 t) of copper destined for Italy.

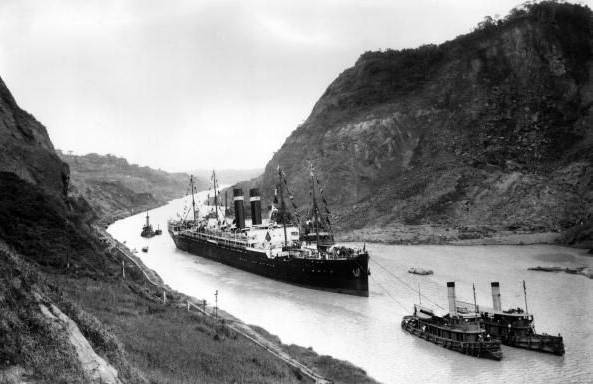
SS Kroonland sails in the Culebra Cut of the Panama Canal on 2 February 1915. Kroonland was the largest passenger ship to transit the canal to that date.

On 28 October, British authorities detained the ship at Gibraltar. Because neutral Italy did not restrict the shipment of copper (which could be used in war munitions) to Germany or Austria-Hungary, the British claimed the right to detain the ship—a claim disputed by the U.S. State Department. Kroonland was allowed to resume her journey on 8 November after the copper and rubber were unloaded and taken to a prize court. The ship arrived at Naples on 11 November, then completed the rest of her Mediterranean trek. Returning to New York, she carried the new minister from Bulgaria to the United States, arriving on 4 December. IMM had advertised that Kroonland would sail the Mediterranean route again in December, but the liner was removed from the route.

In late January 1915, Kroonland departed on a business tour of South America under charter to the American Trade Tour Company. The tour was designed as a showcase for American companies hoping to expand into South America, and Kroonland circumnavigated that continent, traveling over 15,000 nautical miles (28,000 km) in 82 days. During the voyage, the liner docked at various ports where businessmen or trade representatives, like the Babson Statistical Organization, made sales pitches and showed films of factories to potential customers aboard Kroonland. During this South American foray, the ship sailed westbound through the Panama Canal on 2 February, becoming the largest passenger ship to transit the canal to that date. (Note: The smaller Great Northern of the Northern Pacific Line transited the canal on the same date.) Also on the trip, while transiting the Straits of Magellan in late February, Kroonland passed British cruiser Bristol refueling from a collier, and, on 26 February, when entering the harbor of Punta Arenas, Chile, passed the departing HMS Glasgow, on the hunt for the German cruiser Dresden. Kroonland returned to New York on 14 April.

== Panama Pacific Line service, 1915 ==
In May 1915, Kroonland and sister ship Finland were chartered to the Panama Pacific Line for the long-planned service between New York and San Francisco via the Panama Canal. Kroonland departed from New York for California on 22 May and counted 50 honeymooning couples and a large cargo of flour from St. Paul, Minnesota, among her payload. The intercoastal trip took about 17 days each way and the ships called at either Los Angeles or San Diego on eastbound and westbound trips. With two ships on the route, one ship departed from either New York or San Francisco about every three weeks. The service was marketed as the ideal manner to visit the Panama–California Exposition in San Diego and the Panama–Pacific International Exposition in San Francisco. At the San Francisco exhibition, a detailed model of Kroonland was one of ten that comprised a part of IMM's 6,500-square-foot (600 m^{2}) exhibit in the Palace of Transportation.

Frequent and progressively worse landslides in the canal disrupted Kroonland's and Finland's service. In August 1915, Kroonland's arrival in New York was delayed a day by a Gaillard Cut slide. In early September, both ships were delayed ten days while waiting for the canal to be dredged after another slide. In early October, another landslide in the Gaillard Cut—this one in excess of 1,000,000 cubic yards (760,000 m^{3}) of mud and dirt—closed the canal, and it was expected that it might remain closed for as long as ten months. Kroonland was en route to the canal from San Francisco, while Finland was at the canal's eastern terminus, Colón. After Kroonland arrived at the canal's western end at Balboa, the two liners exchanged passengers—including former First Lady Helen Taft (Note: Helen Herron Taft had sailed on Kroonland ten years before, in October 1905) and her daughter, Helen—by rail across the isthmus.

== American Line service, 1915–1917 ==
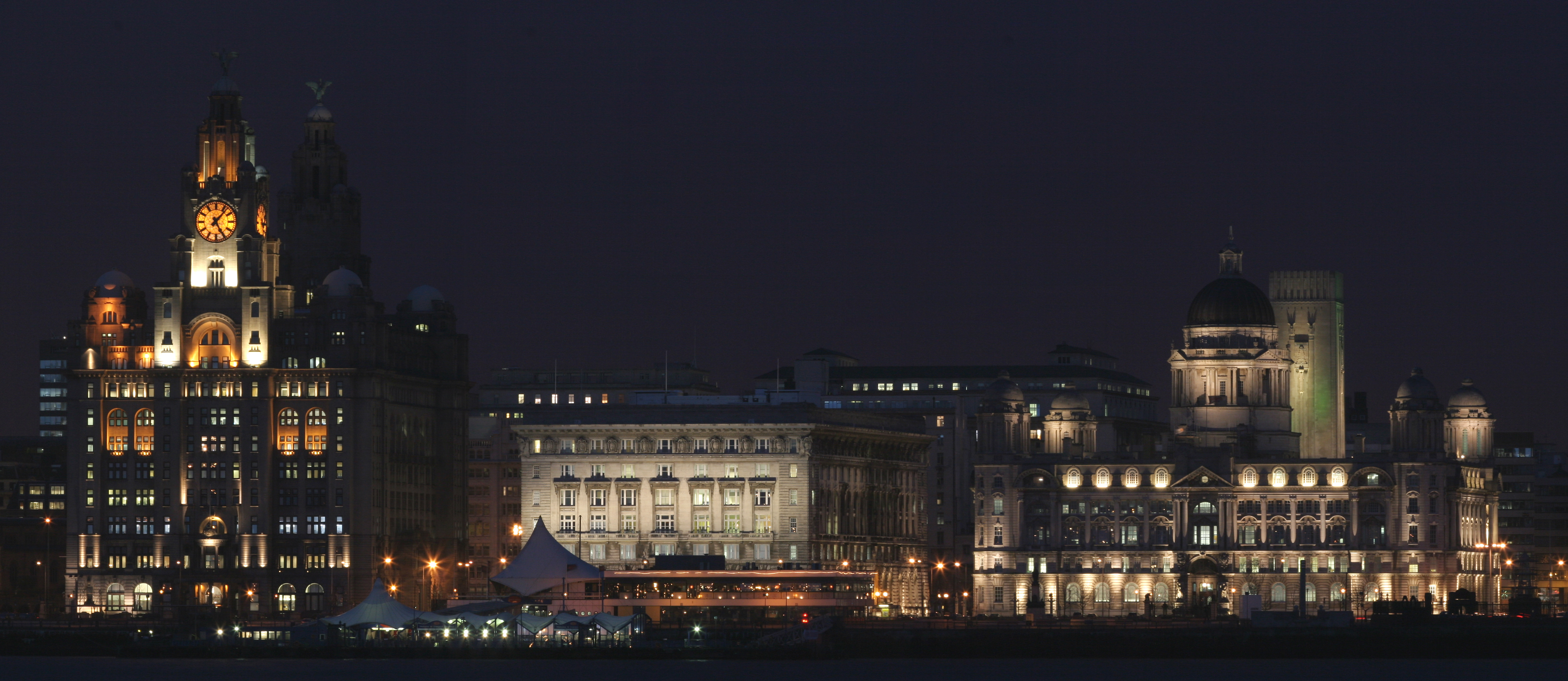
During Kroonland's time on New York – Liverpool service, she would have been greeted by The Three Graces of Liverpool's Pier Head.

The delay caused by the October slide in the Panama Canal created uncertainty for the immediate future of Kroonland. Her sister ship Finland was transferred to a New York – London route almost immediately after the canal's closure, but Kroonland was "trapped" on the west side of the continent. By early November, Kroonland—loaded with cargo destined for the United Kingdom, and sailing under the banner of the American Line—departed San Francisco for London, via the Straits of Magellan. On 21 December, the liner arrived at Rio de Janeiro after having run aground, but was found to be undamaged. Continuing on to London, Kroonland departed for New York on 30 January 1916. Although plans were announced in mid 1916 for the two sister ships to return to the Panama Pacific Line, and to add the Hawaiian port of Honolulu to the canal route, both ships remained in North Atlantic service.

On 20 February, Kroonland, continuing to sail for the American Line, returned to New York – Liverpool service after an absence of 18 months. As a ship of the still-neutral United States sailing in a war zone, Kroonland had her name painted in large letters on each side of her hull. The name was flanked on either side by large American flags and kept illuminated at night. In June, she carried US$1,500,000 of Argentine gold from London for deposit with the Guaranty Trust Company of New York. On late 1916, a cook aboard Kroonland was arrested for smuggling feathers, wings, and heads of birds of paradise and crowned pigeons. The man, who was paid $300 for each load of feathers, smuggled in at least three loads of the avian contraband before his arrest. In January 1917, a jumble sale held in the saloon on Kroonland raised £73 15s 11d for The Times Fund, for the benefit of the British Red Cross and the Order of St. John.

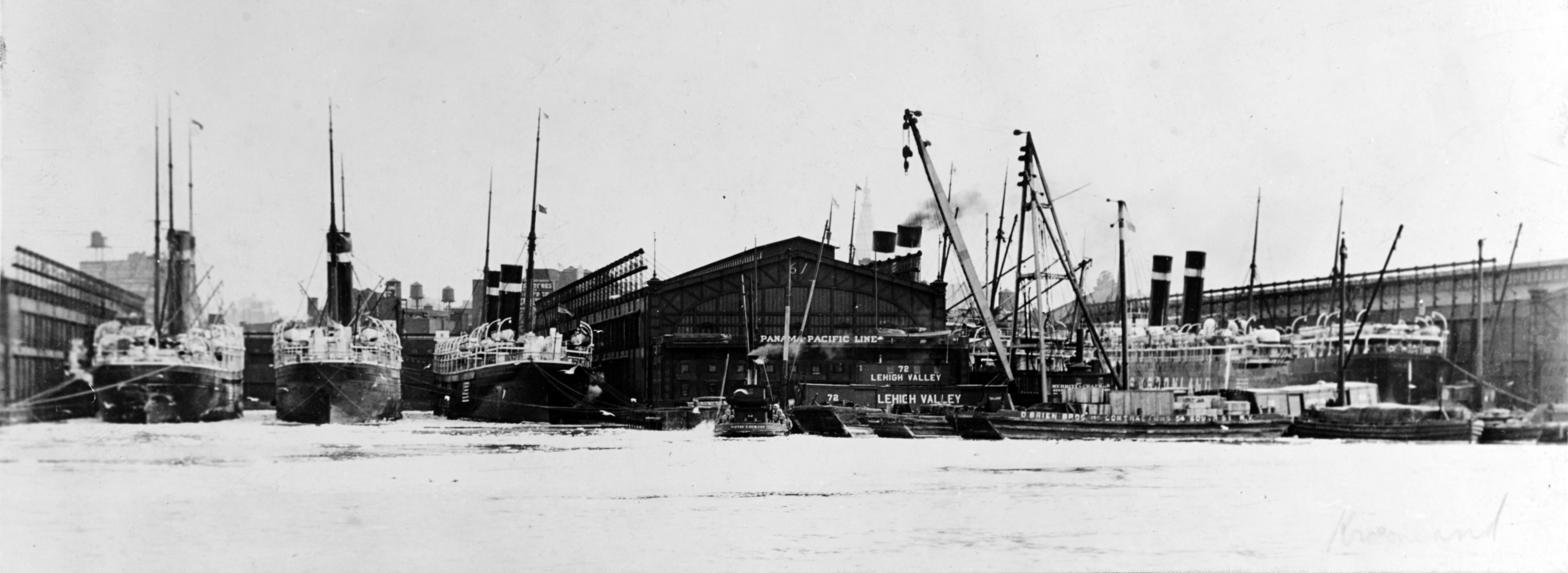
Five American Line steamers are seen laid up in New York in February 1917 after Germany resumed unrestricted submarine warfare.

While returning from Liverpool in early February 1917, passengers and crew on Kroonland witnessed the German U-boat UC-46 sink the Dutch ship Gamma off the Irish coast. On 1 February 1917, at around 15:30, passengers and crew saw the German submarine overtake and stop the Dutch freighter. At about 16:15, the U-boat, by then on the far side of the Dutch ship and out of view from Kroonland, fired three shots from her deck gun. Gamma immediately began listing to port and sank within five minutes. Kroonland was less than 5 nautical miles (9.3 km) away, and was prepared to rescue the crew of the sunken ship, but stopped when the German submarine took Gamma's lifeboat in tow. Four days later, a suspected submarine was seen 5 nautical miles (9.3 km) off Kroonland's port side, and there were other reports of a ship that passengers took to be a German commerce raider or submarine tender.

Because Germany had resumed unrestricted submarine warfare again on 1 February, Kroonland was laid up for almost two months at the American Line piers in New York, along with sister ship Finland and three other vessels. During this forced downtime, Kroonland was converted from coal burning to oil burning, a long-awaited modification that had been announced in October 1915. The conversion reduced the number of stokers needed from 75 to 12, lowering Kroonland's payroll. Because fuel oil was stored inside the double bottom of her hull, her cargo capacity was increased through the elimination of her coal bunkers. The labor savings and the additional freight revenues from the increased cargo space resulted in a net gain of $25,000 income per trip.

== Troopship duties ==
Kroonland served as a troopship for about the next year. (Note: Sources are unclear under what purview Kroonland sailed. Bonsor (p. 856) simply lists "1917 US troopship". Kroonland is recorded as being a United States Army transport ship from mid-February 1918 by the Dictionary of American Naval Fighting Ships (See entry here).) In early March, U.S. Navy ordnance officers inspected Kroonland and took measurements in preparation to arm her for defense against submarine attacks. On 13 March, she was assigned guns by the Navy, becoming one of the first seven ships to be armed. With her arming complete, and carrying an armed naval guard to man the guns, Kroonland sailed for Liverpool on 25 March 1917. Twelve days later, the United States formally declared war on Germany.

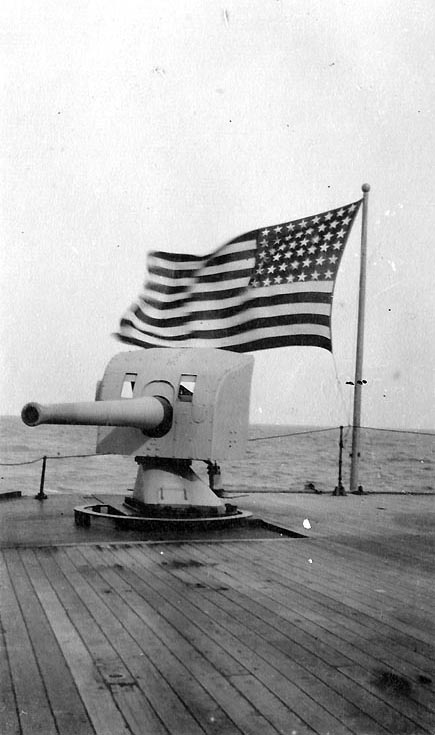
A 4-inch (102 mm) gun on Kroonland, one of the first seven defensively armed American merchant ships

On the morning of 20 May, while the liner steamed toward Liverpool through a heavy fog, a torpedo struck her without exploding. Two minutes later her lookouts spotted a submarine bearing down on Kroonland so close alongside the liner that her guns could not be depressed enough to open fire on the raider. Although the U-boat, apparently also taken by surprise, reversed her screws and tried to turn to avoid a collision, she lightly struck the liner's hull and scraped along her side before diving out of sight. Meanwhile, two more torpedoes came within some 20 feet (6 m) of hitting Kroonland's stern. That afternoon the liner sighted another submarine, surfaced some 1,000 yards (910 m) off her port quarter. Kroonland immediately began shelling the U-boat, forcing the submarine to dive for safety. In early June, this failed torpedo attack on the ship made front-page news in American newspapers.

In September, elements of the U.S. 42nd Infantry Division sailed from New York to Halifax on Kroonland. The ship sailed from Halifax on 30 September in an Allied convoy with the American ship Mongolia and Commonwealth ships Carmania (which had led the Volturno rescue in 1913), Anchises, Canada, Grampian, Ionican, (Note: This may actually be Ionian, a steamer with the Allan Line that was engaged in troop transport around this time. See Bonsor, vol. 1, p. 322.) Themistocles, Victoria, Carpathia, Medic, Miltiades, Mokoia, and Ruahine. (Note: Several of these ships were carrying Australian and New Zealand troops, and had been the first transports loaded with troops to use the Panama Canal. See "AWM Collection Record: PR91/118". Australian War Memorial. 29 May 2008. Archived from the original on 9 February 2012.) Two days out from Halifax, the last five ships split off from the convoy and headed to Scotland; Kroonland's group sailed to Liverpool.

On 15 October 1917, the United States Shipping Board (USSB) requisitioned all American passenger ships over 2,500 GT for use by the government in the war effort. Though it is not clear what immediate impact this had on Kroonland, it is known that the liner was operating as a U.S. Army transport (under the name USAT Kroonland) by February 1918, when she was loaded with materiel and departed New York for Saint-Nazaire, France.

In February 1918, the USSB assigned Kroonland to the transport fleet as a U.S. Army Chartered Transport (USACT), and after her return from France on 9 April, she was converted to a troop transport in New York by the William J. Kennedy Company. A typical conversion from passenger liner to troop transport involved having all of the second- and third-class accommodations ripped out and replaced with berths for troops. Cooking and toilet facilities also had to be greatly expanded to handle the large numbers of men aboard.

== U.S. Navy transport duties ==
After problems with crew discipline aboard Army transports Antilles and Finland when they were torpedoed, the U.S. Navy, led by the recommendations of Rear Admiral Albert Gleaves, insisted that all troop transports be manned entirely by Navy personnel. This was accomplished soon after, to avoid the need for what Gleaves called "ignorant and unreliable men" who were "the sweepings of the docks". Accordingly, Kroonland was handed over to the Navy on 22 April and commissioned the same day.

=== Transporting troops to France ===
USS Kroonland was assigned to the Cruiser and Transport Force after being commissioned. The ship departed New York on 30 April with the transports Matsonia, Manchuria, and Finland. Martha Washington and Powhatan—two transports that sailed from Newport News, Virginia—rendezvoused with Kroonland's group. South Dakota provided the convoy with protection until its arrival in France on 12 May. Kroonland returned to New York on 1 June.

Kroonland next left New York on 15 June with Finland, DeKalb, George Washington, Covington, Rijndam, the Italian steamer Dante Alighieri, and the British steamer Vauban and met up with the Newport News portion of the convoy—consisting of Lenape, Wilhelmina, Princess Matoika, Pastores, and the British troopship Czar (another fellow Volturno rescuer)—the next morning and set out for France. The convoy was escorted by the cruisers North Carolina and Frederick, and the destroyers Stevens and Fairfax; the battleship Texas and several other destroyers joined in escort duties for the group for a time. The convoy had a false alarm when a floating barrel was mistaken for submarine, but the otherwise uneventful trip concluded at Brest on the afternoon of 27 June.

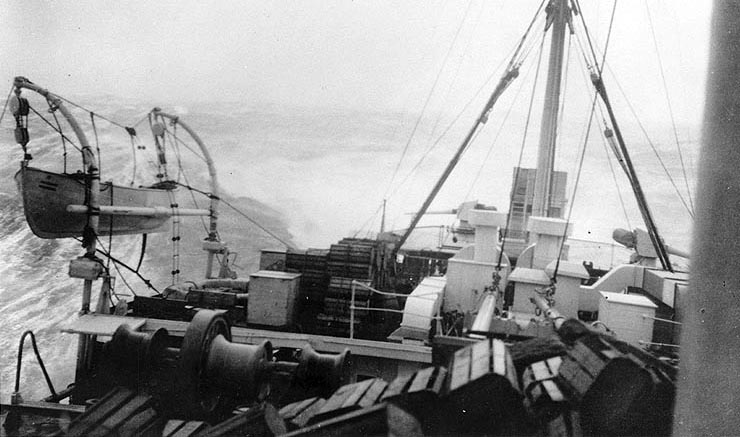
Kroonland pitches in heavy seas during a transatlantic crossing while in Navy service.

On 10 July, as Kroonland steamed homeward from France, a lookout spotted a periscope rising from the water about 200 yards (180 m) away. Kroonland opened fire and the fourth shot from her No. 4 gun "burst with a tremendous cloud of dirty blue smoke" exactly on the periscope. The submarine zig-zagged "erratically back and forth until she was directly in the disturbed water" of Kroonland's wake. The transport continued firing until the submarine disappeared, leaving an oil slick which could be seen for at least 15 minutes. (Note: On her return journey, Covington's encounter with a submarine had a decidedly different outcome. She was torpedoed by U-86 on 1 July and sank the next afternoon. See: "Covington". DANFS.) Kroonland arrived safely in New York on 13 July.

On 26 July, Kroonland, loaded with 3,248 officers and men, departed on her next trip to France. In the company of Finland and the Italian steamer Taormina, she met up with Pocahontas, Susquehanna, and the Italian steamers Duca d'Aosta and Caserta from Newport News. The cruisers Pueblo, Huntington, and destroyers Rathburne and Colhoun escorted the transports. Gordon Van Kleeck, a private in Company F of the U.S. 51st Pioneer Infantry, one of the units aboard Kroonland on this trip, recorded his day-to-day activities in a journal. He stated that the soldiers wore overalls rather than uniforms, and were required to wear life jackets at all times. During the early mornings, the most dangerous time for submarines according to Van Kleeck, the soldiers had to stand by their life rafts until the sun was completely up. Bathing facilities were too small, so several times during the trip the soldiers gathered on deck for salt water baths, which consisted of a hose turned on them by the ship's crew. On 2 August, Finland developed engine trouble and fell back from the convoy, but by the next day, she and a destroyer that stayed with her had rejoined the convoy. The convoy arrived in Brest on 7 August, and Kroonland arrived back in the United States on 19 August.

After embarking 3,334 soldiers, Kroonland began her next crossing on 30 August when she sailed from New York with Susquehanna, Harrisburg and Plattsburg to join the Newport News contingent of Duca d'Aosta, Caserta, and America. Kroonland's convoy was escorted by Frederick and Colhoun. As with other Navy ships throughout 1918, Kroonland was not immune to the worldwide Spanish flu pandemic. On this particular crossing, two of her crewmen were felled by the disease as her convoy reached France on 12 September. Kroonland returned to New York on 27 September.

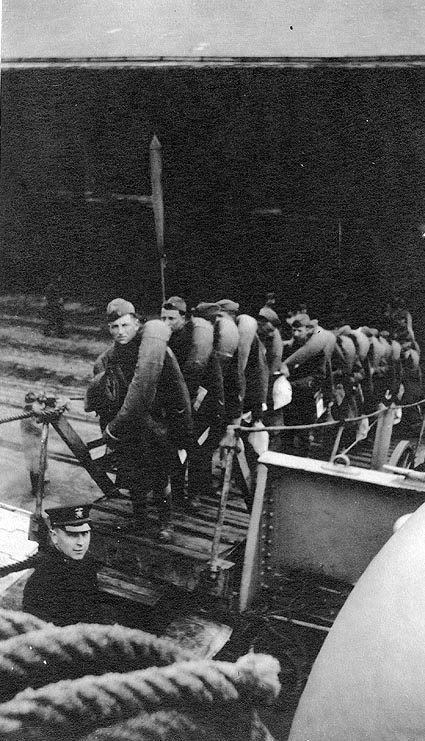
Troops board Kroonland at Saint-Nazaire, France, on 11 March 1919 to return to the United States.

At 20:00 on 7 October, Kroonland departed New York on her fifth Navy voyage with 2,567 men. She joined Caserta and the British steamer Euripides in rendezvousing with Tenadores, Susquehanna, America, and Czar from Newport News. The cruisers Seattle and Rochester and the destroyers Murray and Fairfax served as convoy escorts for the group, which arrived in France on 20 October. Kroonland arrived in New York on 3 November, and was in port when the Armistice was signed on 11 November. In total, Kroonland carried 14,125 troops to France during the five trips of her Navy career.

=== Returning troops home ===
At war's end, the task of bringing home American soldiers began almost immediately. Kroonland did her part by carrying home 26,152 passengers in eight trips. The ship departed from Brest in late November with her first load of nearly 2,000 wounded and convalescing soldiers, many of whom were from the U.S. 76th Infantry Division. The former liner arrived at the Quarantine Station on 10 December 1918, and docked in New York the next day. One of the men aboard was Captain Walter Camp who had been wounded and gassed in the Meuse-Argonne Offensive; Camp was the son of the Yale University football coach of the same name. Another passenger on board was Sarah Wilmer, an American YWCA front-line worker who had become lost in the Argonne forest and gassed when a German shell exploded nearby. Before departing on her next voyage, Kroonland hosted a party for 150 newsboys from New Jersey at her Hoboken, New Jersey, pier on Christmas Day. With a Christmas tree in the troops' mess, the newsboys were treated to a dinner and entertainment by the ship's band, and all received presents.

Kroonland arrived at Newport News on 18 February with 2,805 passengers, including units from the U.S. 36th Infantry Division, after a rough trip from Saint-Nazaire. On her next voyage, she carried another 2,943 officers and men from Saint-Nazaire to Newport News, arriving there on 24 March. The 132nd Regiment of the 61st Field Artillery Brigade returned on the ship, and brigade historian Rex F. Harlow called Kroonland "probably the best vessel on which any units of the brigade returned to America".

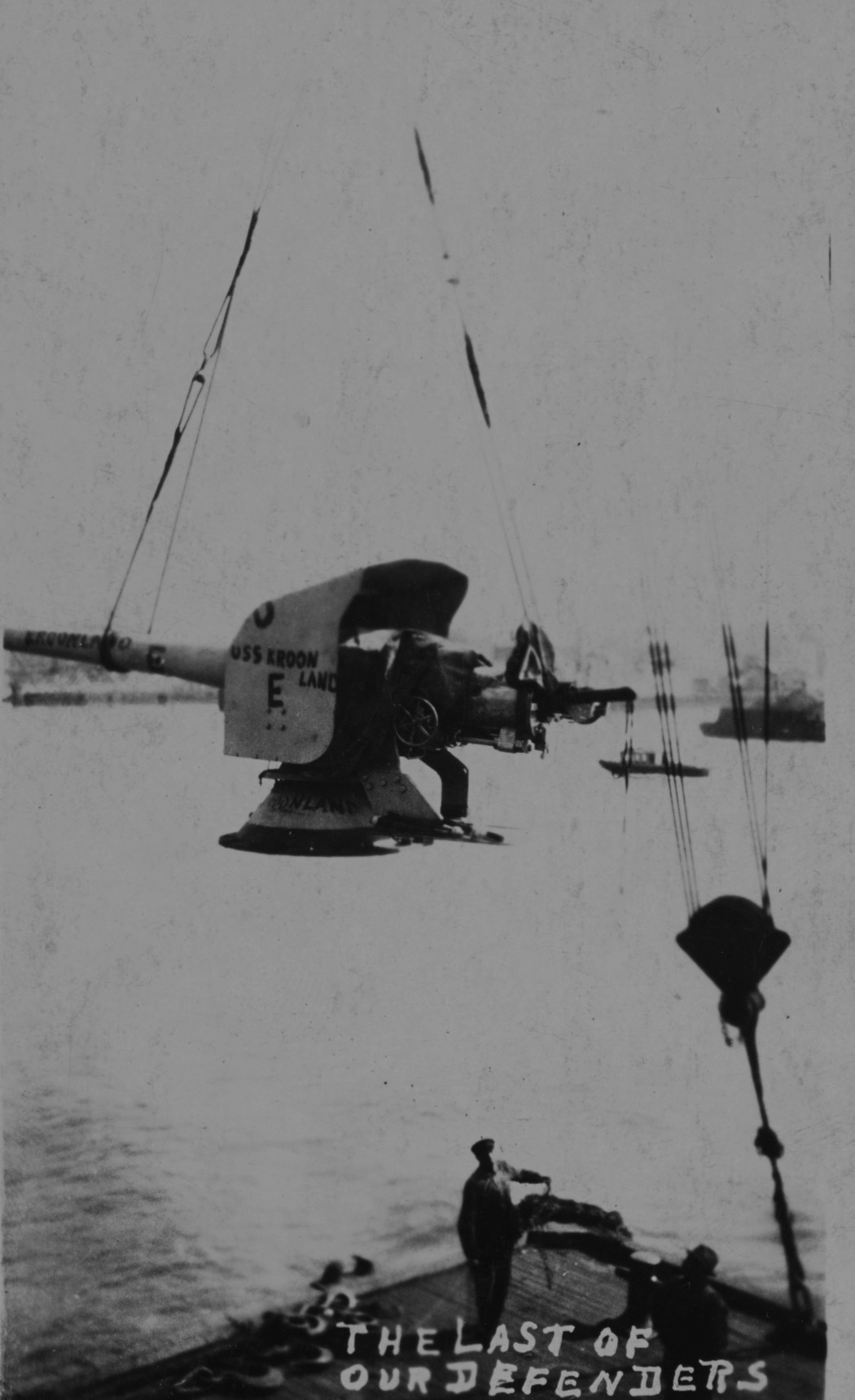
After her Navy service ended, Kroonland's 4-inch (100 mm) guns were removed before she was returned to her owners, International Mercantile Marine.

On 18 April, Kroonland began her next homeward journey, embarking several companies of the 111th Infantry Regiment of the U.S. 28th Infantry Division among the 3,100 troops carried. Though the fighting was over, the men still wore life jackets for the first three days at sea amidst fears of striking floating mines. George W. Cooper, historian of the 2nd Battalion of the 111th Infantry, reported that some of the men had to serve as stokers during the trip because of a "shortage of help". In the middle of the crossing, the ship "sprung a leak" and took on 10 feet (3.0 m) of water; she had a list for a day or so, until repairs were made. The troops later disembarked at New York on 29 April.

Kroonland returned to Saint-Nazaire in May and loaded Major General Joseph E. Kuhn and some 3,000 men of his U.S. 79th Infantry Division, which included the 304th Engineer Regiment, and departed France on 18 May. The band of the 304th Engineers gave concerts on deck every evening on the voyage home to entertain the men. Though initially bound for Newport News, Kroonland's crew received orders in mid ocean to head instead to New York, where they arrived on 29 May. After completing another passage to Newport News in late June, Kroonland sailed on 19 July with 3,642 passengers—including officers, men, thirteen war brides, and one war baby—from Saint-Nazaire, in the final transport departure from that port before it was closed as a port of embarkation by U.S. military authorities. Among the passengers was Brigadier General Samuel D. Rockenbach, the founder of the Tank Corps.

On 21 August, the USSB announced that Kroonland would be released from government service after surveys for repairs had been completed. After leaving New York on 10 August, the ship was in the middle of what would be her final trip returning soldiers. After arriving at Brest, 1,532 officers and men boarded Kroonland for New York, where the transport arrived on 10 September. Also on board was Michael Gilhooley, a 15-year-old stowaway making his fourth unsuccessful attempt to sneak into the United States aboard a Navy transport.

The ship was decommissioned and returned to the USSB on 13 September, and returned to International Mercantile Marine shortly thereafter. In her eight trips returning troops, Kroonland—affectionately called the "Empress of the Seas" by her crew—averaged just under 39 days per turnaround, beating the overall average of all ships by almost a full day, and edging out sister ship Finland by less than that.

== Red Star Line service, 1920–1923 ==
After her return to International Mercantile Marine (IMM), the ship underwent a refit at the W. & A. Fletcher Marine Works yard in Hoboken that outfitted her for 242 first-, 310 second-, and 876 third-class passengers. On 8 January 1920, while Kroonland was still under repair, the American Line ship St. Louis, berthed next to her at the Fletcher yard, caught fire. In the multi-alarm fire, firefighters believed that St. Louis was a lost cause, and so focused their efforts on saving Kroonland. At one point, St. Louis heeled over and leaned on Kroonland but the only resulting damages were scorch marks on her side. (Note: St. Louis was never rebuilt and her hull was scrapped in Italy in 1925. (See "St. Louis". DANFS.))

Kroonland resumed her civilian career in April 1920, sailing once again for the Red Star Line on the New York – Antwerp route. She sailed from Pier 61 on the North River opposite sister ships Finland and Zeeland and the newer Lapland until early 1923. (Note: The fourth sister ship, Vaderland, had been sunk by U-70 off the Irish coast on 4 June 1917 (See Bonsor, vol. 2, p. 855).) Rough weather on the North Atlantic took its toll on Kroonland while sailing this route. A storm off Sable Island in December 1920 was so intense that the liner was only able to travel 126 nautical miles (233 km) during one 24-hour stretch and nearly exhausted her fuel supply. When the liner arrived in New York, tugs were required to tow her from the quarantine station to the pier. Heavy seas in another storm in October 1921 broke Kroonland's port propeller shaft 350 nautical miles (650 km) past Sandy Hook. She returned to New York at 8 knots (15 km/h) and transferred most of the passengers to Lapland. Another eastbound crossing four months later was marked by almost continuous gales with winds up to 90 miles per hour (140 km/h); the liner arrived at Plymouth covered in ice and snow.

Kroonland was also involved in several non-weather-related events. On 12 November 1920, after departing Antwerp for New York, she collided with a Dutch tug in the Scheldt, killing two of the tug's crew. In March 1921, a Czechoslovak woman gave birth to fraternal twins on board the liner shortly after she and her husband sailed from Antwerp. Because the twins were born on a U.S.-flagged vessel, they were automatically American citizens. On 10 June 1922, The New York Times reported that Charles Simmons, Kroonland's Chief Steward, was found dead in his bunk. Crewmen aboard the ship, which had been docked in New York since 4 June, said Simmons had been seen on deck in apparently good health the day before. The medical examiner nevertheless asked police to investigate, because it appeared to him that Simmons had been dead for three to four days. (Note: There were no further reports on the death or investigation in the newspaper.) During an August eastbound crossing, Kroonland stood by for two hours after receiving a report of an explosion and fire on RMS Adriatic, some 70 nautical miles (130 km) behind. The gas explosion in one of Adriatic's forward cargo holds killed five crewmen and seriously wounded three others. It also spawned a fire that was quickly extinguished and left little damage. Offers of help from ten liners (including Kroonland) were politely declined and Adriatic arrived in New York three days later. In October, U.S. Federal judge Learned Hand issued a restraining order preventing the Prohibition-related seizure of alcohol aboard Kroonland, Finland, and St. Paul. IMM had sought the order to enable her to continue to carry Italian third-class passengers; Italian law required a minimum number of a ship's crew to be Italian, with Italian wine of at least 12% alcohol provided for them.

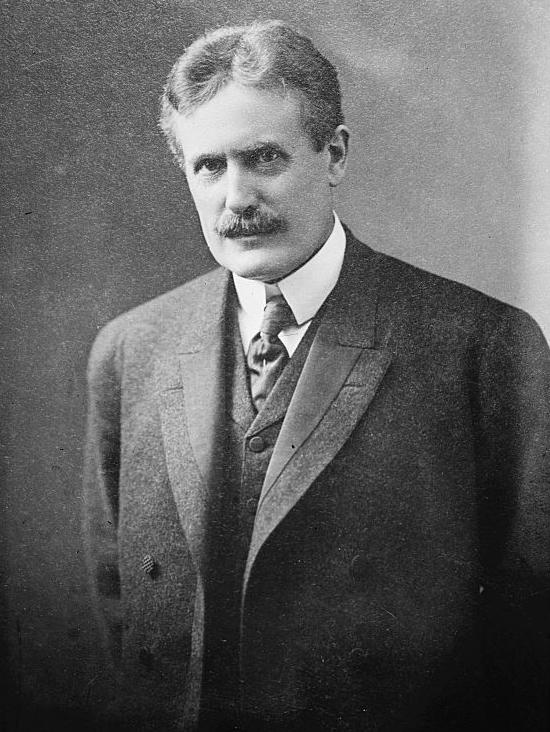
Ambassador Myron T. Herrick was part of the U.S. delegation to the International Chamber of Commerce which sailed on Kroonland in 1920.

Kroonland also carried some notable passengers during her time on this route including a majority of the U.S. delegates to the International Chamber of Commerce for its meeting in Paris in June 1920. Among those on board were Myron T. Herrick, former U.S. Ambassador to France; Paul M. Warburg, former member of the Federal Reserve Board; and 14 current and former directors of the United States Chamber of Commerce. Dr. Samuel Eyde, the newly appointed Norwegian Minister to the United States, sailed for his diplomatic post in December on Kroonland. On the same trip, Max Goldberg, a 14-year-old flower delivery boy, returned from an accidental roundtrip, begun in New York when the gangway was raised and the ship departed while he was making a last-minute delivery. Four of the United States' seven delegates to the 19th Inter-Parliamentary Union Convention in Stockholm—Congressmen Alben W. Barkley and Edwin B. Brooks, and Senators Thomas J. Walsh and William B. McKinley—returned on Kroonland in September 1921.

Passengers were not the ship's only cargo during this time. The New York press reported on gold deposits carried to the United States on the liner several times on the Antwerp route. In a storm-tossed December 1920 voyage, for example, she carried $1,650,000 in gold, and the following June she carried £100,000 gold to the Equitable Trust Company in New York. Another notable cargo arrived in New York in November 1922, when Kroonland brought 840,000 pounds (380,000 kg) of cheese from Switzerland. The shipment was said to be the first big shipment from that country since before World War I. A more unwelcome cargo was carried in March 1921, when a Hungarian immigrant in steerage was found to have typhoid fever. Discovery of the disease necessitated that all 731 steerage passengers be quarantined indefinitely.

Kroonland began her last voyage on the Antwerp route in January 1923, after which she underwent a refit during the first half of 1923. The ship was converted to cabin- and third-class passengers only, and was painted white. In preparation for her announced return to the Panama Pacific Line in October 1923, more refrigeration and cool air space were added for transporting Southern California agricultural products.

After this refit, the ship was briefly assigned to the American Line for three roundtrips on a New York to Hamburg route, with intermediate stops at Plymouth and Cherbourg. On her first Hamburg trip, she carried American comedic actress Florence Shirley and her husband, headed for a European vacation. Cecil Arden, a mezzo-soprano with the Metropolitan Opera, and botanist Otto Warburg sailed on the same trip.

== Panama Pacific Line service, 1923–1925 ==
In April 1923, IMM announced that Kroonland and sister ship Finland would be returned to the Panama Pacific Line beginning in late September, sailing from New York to San Francisco via Havana, the Panama Canal, and Los Angeles, with Los Angeles being the west coast hub of operations. On 18 October, Kroonland departed on her first voyage on the route since 1915. Kroonland arrived in Los Angeles Harbor on 3 November amidst fanfare, becoming the largest liner to date to enter that harbor. (Note: On Kroonland's previous visits, she had to anchor offshore and use lighters to transfer passengers and cargo. See: "Notables welcome Kroonland". Los Angeles Times. 4 November 1923. p. I-3.)

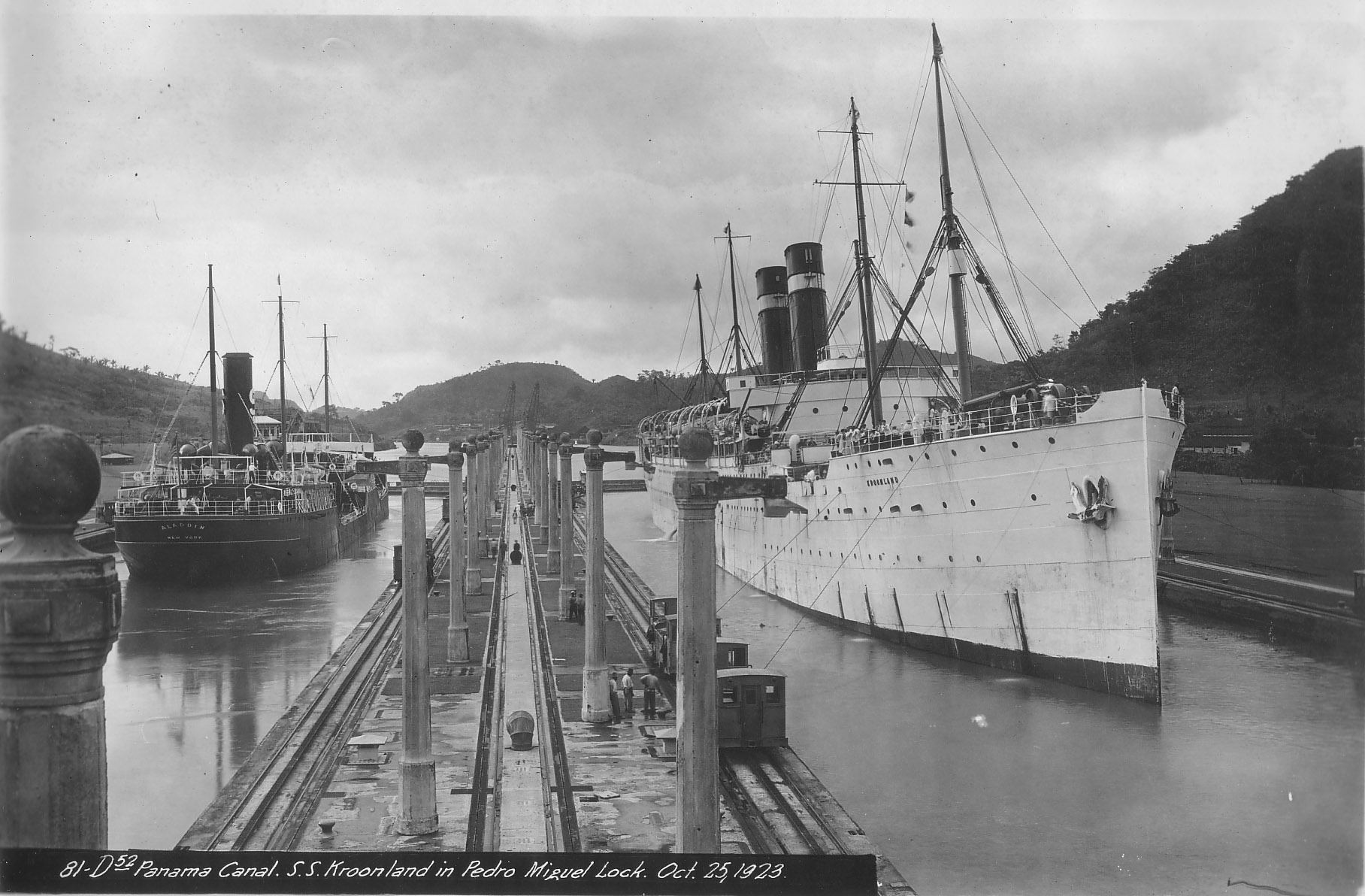
Kroonland passes through the Pedro Miguel Locks of the Panama Canal on 23 October 1923. It was the liner's first voyage on the New York – San Francisco route after an absence of eight years.

In contrast to her time on the North Atlantic, Kroonland encountered few weather or mechanical delays on the coast-to-coast route. In December 1923, however, the ship was delayed one day by unusually heavy seas and gales off Baja California. Another delay in October 1924 proved to be fatal, according to the ship's physician. An arrival two days late, caused by adverse currents north of Panama, cost a female passenger her life. Had the ship not been delayed, the physician believed, prompt hospital care could have saved her. On this same trip, Kroonland passed through a "hurricane zone" but was not adversely affected by the storm. (Note: In all probability the "hurricane zone" referred to the Cuba hurricane (12–23 October) of the 1924 season that formed in the Caribbean Sea off the Yucatan Peninsula and moved across Cuba, Florida, and into the Atlantic.)

In December 1924, the Panama Pacific Line announced that it would add Mongolia to the New York – California route in February to replace Kroonland. Even though press accounts reported as late as March 1925 that Kroonland had sailed her last on the route, she continued carrying passengers and cargo through at least June 1925 because of booming business. Although plans had been announced to convert Kroonland and Finland to freighters upon the delivery of two new ships ordered for the route in late 1924, there is no evidence that this was ever carried out.

=== Notable passengers ===
Kroonland carried her share of notable passengers during her second stint for the Panama Pacific Line. On her first voyage, passengers included American modernist poet Wallace Stevens and his wife, Elsie. After transiting the Panama Canal, the liner headed north along the western coast of Mexico. The ship passed the Gulf and Isthmus of Tehuantepec in early November, inspiring Stevens to later pen the poem "Sea Surface Full Of Clouds". First published in the July 1924 issue of literary magazine The Dial, it was later included in the 1931 edition of Stevens' Harmonium. Each of the five stanzas begins with the line "In that November off Tehuantepec" and is a different portrayal of the surface of the sea. The poem has been called one of Stevens' "most persuasive statements of the imagination's powers", and considered "the most perfect example of a 'pure poem'".

Other notable passengers included professional baseball player Ray E. French, who sailed with his wife to their home in California on the same voyage as Stevens. California artist William Barr, American author Frederick O'Brien, and actress Mary Carr all sailed on Kroonland in December 1923. In February 1924, Daniel Willard, president of the Baltimore and Ohio Railroad, sailed from New York to Los Angeles. Acknowledging that the Panama Canal had "detract[ed] volumes of freight" from railroads, Willard said that there was no cause for alarm because the railroad business was booming. In January 1925, Gene Byrnes, creator of the comic strip Reg'lar Fellers, sailed from New York to Los Angeles with his wife. On the same voyage, University of Southern California president Rufus B. von KleinSmid boarded Kroonland at Panama after attending the Pan-American Scientific Congress in Lima. In mid-June the same year, short story author and screenwriter H. C. Witwer and his family returned to New York aboard the ship.

== American Line service, 1925–1926 ==
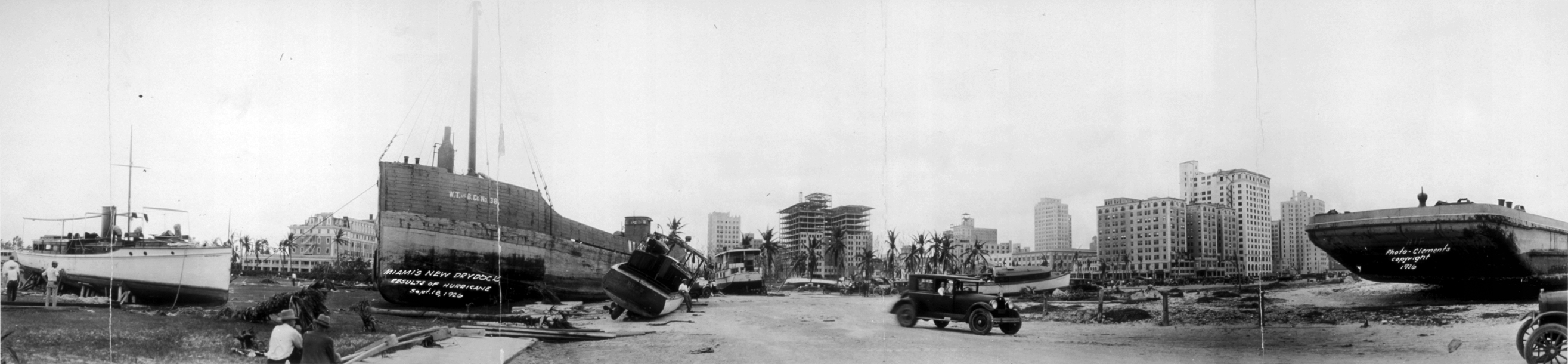
Kroonland's New York – Miami service was not renewed following the 1926 Miami Hurricane which struck the city in September, causing widespread damage.

In October 1925, the American Line announced plans for the liner to sail on a weekly New York – Miami route. Kroonland, supplanted H. F. Alexander (Note: H. F. Alexander was a later name for Great Northern, the ship that transited the Panama Canal the same day as Kroonland back in February 1915.) of the Admiral Line as the largest ship in Miami service, and sailed from Pier 62 in New York on Thursdays, arrived and departed Miami on Sundays, and returned to New York on Wednesdays. Though Kroonland's passenger capacity was potentially much larger, she was outfitted for 500 passengers in first class only. She sailed on her first voyage with 400 passengers, including American professional golfer Gene Sarazen, on 10 December.

By the time the seasonal service to Miami ended in late March 1926, Kroonland had carried 11,000 passengers on the route. Though plans were announced for the liner to resume the route the following winter, this did not happen. IMM offered no reasons, but conditions in Miami at the end of 1926 were very different from the previous year. The wild South Florida real estate boom had collapsed in mid 1926, and the Great Miami Hurricane struck on 18 September, killing more than 325 and leaving as many as 50,000 residents homeless, while causing some $100 million damage (equivalent to $1,819 million in 2025). With no place to put the aging ship, IMM laid up Kroonland in Hoboken.

The ship was later sold to shipbreakers in Italy and departed the United States for the last time on 29 January 1927. After delivering a cargo of grain to her old homeport of Antwerp, she was taken to Genoa and scrapped. According to an Associated Press report, Kroonland had completed 234 voyages totaling 1,635,468 nautical miles (3,028,887 km) during the course of her career without serious accident. (Note: The Associated Press article did not state whether the career totals included wartime service.)

== Bibliography ==
- Bliss, Edward (1991). Now The News: The Story of Broadcast Journalism. New York: Columbia University Press. ISBN 978-0-231-04402-8. OCLC 22731482.
- Bonsor, N. R. P. (1978) [1955]. North Atlantic Seaway, Volume 2 (Enlarged and completely revised ed.). Saint Brélade, Jersey: Brookside Publications. ISBN 0-905824-01-6. OCLC 29930159.
- Brent, Charles Henry (2015) [1916]. A Master Builder, Being the Life and Letters of Henry Yates Satterlee, First Bishop of Washington. New York: Longmans, Green. ISBN 9781331088448. OCLC 3150392.
- Brooklyn Daily Eagle (January 1921). "Steamship and Steamboat Lines, Principal Offices and Sailings". Brooklyn Daily Eagle Almanac. XXXVI. Brooklyn. OCLC 1586159.
- Bureau of Ordnance (1920). Navy Ordnance Activities: World War, 1917–1918. Washington, D.C.: United States Government Printing Office. OCLC 686627.
- Burling, Lancaster D. (May 1917). "Education, efficiency and economy, with special reference to mining". The Scientific Monthly. 4 (5). New York: The Science Press: 438. Bibcode:1917SciMo...4..438B. ISSN 0096-3771. OCLC 7473786.
- Cook, Eleanor (2007). A Reader's Guide to Wallace Stevens. Princeton, New Jersey: Princeton University Press. ISBN 978-0-691-04983-0. OCLC 69013774.
- Coons, Lorraine; Alexander Varias (July 2003). Tourist Third Cabin: Steamship Travel in the Interwar Years (1st ed.). New York: Palgrave Macmillan. ISBN 978-0-312-21429-6. OCLC 51861968.
- Cooper, George W. (1920). Our Second Battalion: The Accurate and Authentic History of the Second Battalion 111th Infantry. Pittsburgh: Second Battalion Book Co. OCLC 4139237.
- Crowell, Benedict; Wilson, Robert Forrest (1921). The Road to France: The Transportation of Troops and Military Supplies, 1917–1918. How America Went to War: An Account From Official Sources of the Nation's War Activities, 1917–1920. Vol. 2. New Haven: Yale University Press. LCCN 2006940346. OCLC 18696066.
- Cutchins, John A.; George Scott Stewart Jr. (1921). History of the Twenty-ninth division, "Blue and gray," 1917–1919. Philadelphia: Press of MacCalla & Co. OCLC 3260003.
- Fess, Simeon D. (1917). The Problems of Neutrality When the World Is at War: A History of Our Relations with Germany and Great Britain as Detailed in the Documents That Passed Between the United States and the Two Great Belligerent Powers. Washington, D.C.: United States Government Printing Office. OCLC 2570847.
- Gleaves, Albert (1921). A History of the Transport Service: Adventures and Experiences of United States Transports and Cruisers in the World War. New York: George H. Doran Company. OCLC 976757.
- Grant, W. Henry (24 March 1910). "World Missionary Conference". Herald of Gospel Liberty. 102 (12). Portsmouth, New Hampshire: Elias Smith. OCLC 9860911.
- Harlow, Rex F. (1919). Trail of the 61st: A History of the 61st Field Artillery Brigade During the World War, 1917–1919. Oklahoma City: Harlow Pub. Co. OCLC 4227658.
- Immigration Information Bureau (1979) [1931]. Morton Allan Directory of European Passenger Steamship Arrivals for the Years 1890 to 1930 at the Port of New York and for the years 1904 to 1926 at the ports of New York, Philadelphia, Boston, and Baltimore. Baltimore: Genealogical Pub. Co. OCLC 4705572.
- Jones, John Price; Paul Merrick Hollister (1918). The German Secret Service in America, 1914–1918. Boston: Small, Maynard & Company. OCLC 63576168.
- Litz, A. Walton (1972). Introspective Voyager: The Poetic Development of Wallace Stevens. New York: Oxford University Press. ISBN 978-0-19-501518-8. OCLC 281929.
- Loving, Jerome (2005). The Last Titan: A Life of Theodore Dreiser. Berkeley: University of California Press. ISBN 978-0-520-23481-9. OCLC 55947924.
- McMaster, John Bach (2017) [1918]. The United States in the World War. New York: D. Appelton and Co. ISBN 978-1025217246. OCLC 14915893.
- Naval Historical Center. "Covington". Dictionary of American Naval Fighting Ships. Navy Department, Naval History and Heritage Command.
- Naval Historical Center. "Kroonland". Dictionary of American Naval Fighting Ships. Navy Department, Naval History & Heritage Command.
- Naval Historical Center (9 November 2005). "Personal account by Rear Admiral William B. Caperton of the 1918 Influenza on Armored Cruiser No. 4, USS Pittsburgh, at Rio de Janeiro, Brazil". Navy Department, Naval Historical Center. Archived from the original on 28 February 2008.
- Naval Historical Center. "St. Louis". Dictionary of American Naval Fighting Ships. Navy Department, Naval History & Heritage Command.
- Nixon, Fred W. (n.d.). War book of the U.S.S. Kroonland: "Empress of the Seas", 1918–1919. Chicago: Rogers & Co. OCLC 8980829.
- Pollock, David H. (1905). The Shipbuilding Industry: Its History, Practice, Science and Finance. London: Methuen Publishing. OCLC 1157996.
- Richardson, Joan (1988). Wallace Stevens: The Later Years, 1923–1955. New York: William Morrow. OCLC 185839952.
- Stevens, Wallace (1997). Kermode, Frank; Richardson, Joan (eds.). Wallace Stevens: Collected Poetry and Prose. New York: Library of America. ISBN 978-1-883011-45-1. OCLC 36343461.
- Stathis, Stephen W. (2003). Congressional Gold Medals, 1776–2002. Hauppauge, New York: Novinka Books. ISBN 978-1-59033-514-7. OCLC 50622185.
- Thompson, Hugh S. (2004). Ferrell, Robert H. (ed.). Trench Knives and Mustard Gas: With the 42nd Rainbow Division in France (1st ed.). College Station: Texas A&M University Press. ISBN 978-1-58544-290-4. OCLC 53020338.
- Todd, Frank Morton (1921). The Story of the Exposition: Being the Official History of the International Celebration Held at San Francisco in 1915 to Commemorate the Discovery of the Pacific Ocean and the Construction of the Panama Canal, Volume 4. New York: Panama–Pacific International Exposition Co. OCLC 307967.
- United States Army Corps of Engineers, 304th Regiment (1920). The Official History of the Three Hundred and Fourth Engineer Regiment, Seventy-Ninth Division, U.S.A., During the World War. The Regiment. OCLC 123230628.
- United States Department of State (1922). "Bulgaria". Papers Relating to the Foreign Relations of the United States. Washington, D.C.: United States Government Printing Office. ISSN 1048-6445. OCLC 6699241.
- von der Goltz, Horst (2010) [1917]. My Adventures as a German Secret Agent. New York: R.M. McBride & Co. ISBN 1-152-67492-7. OCLC 405220.
- Vose, Edward Neville (August 1912). "How Panama will alter trade". The World's Work. XXIV (4). New York: Doubleday, Page & Company. OCLC 1770207.
- White, Lonnie J. (1984). "The Homecoming". Panthers to Arrowheads: The 36th (Texas-Oklahoma) Division in World War I. Austin, Texas: Presidial Press. ISBN 978-0-935978-03-2. OCLC 12771711. Archived from the original on 9 May 2008.
- William Cramp & Sons Ship & Engine Building Company (1902). Cramp's shipyard founded by William Cramp, 1830. Philadelphia: William Cramp & Sons Ship & Engine Building Company. OCLC 3118924.
- Williams, Archibald (1908). The Romance of Modern Exploration: With Descriptions of Curious Customs, Thrilling Adventures and Interesting Discoveries of Explorers in All Parts of the World. London: Seeley. OCLC 25878689.
