= SS Volturno =

SS Volturno may refer to:

- SS Volturno (1906), a British ocean liner that caught fire and sank in October 1913
- SS Volturno (1916), an Italian bulk carrier sunk in World War I by German submarine SM UB-50 in March 1918
