= Vaderland =

Vaderland may refer to

== Publications ==
- Het Vaderland

== Ships ==
- SS Vaderland (1873)
- SS Vaderland (1900)

== Other ==
- "Homeland" in the Dutch language
