= James Clayton Barr =

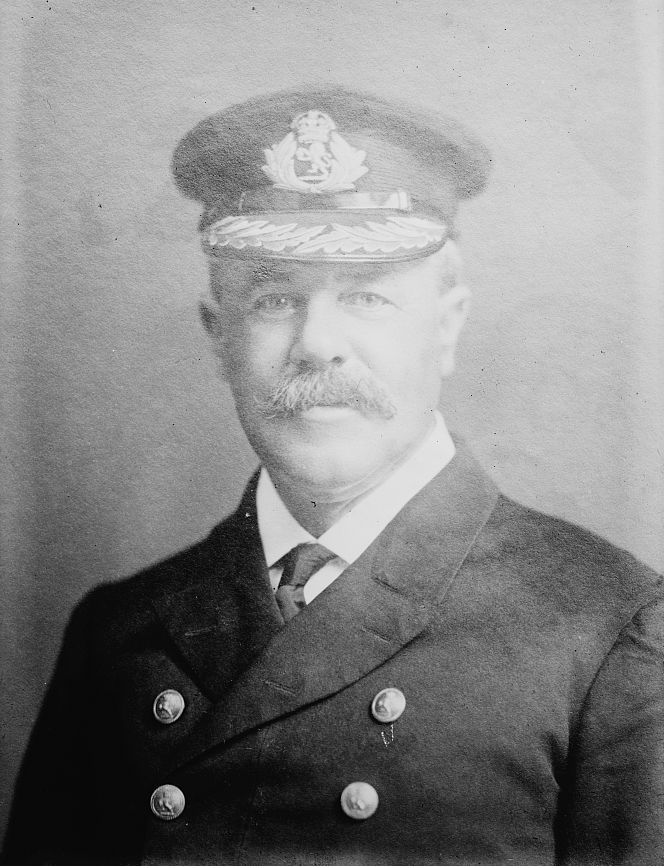
J. C. Barr in 1913

James Clayton Barr CB (1855 – 29 March 1937) was a Senior Commodore of the Cunard line.

== Biography ==
Born in Burnley, Barr first went to sea in 1877 and served mainly in the South American trade. In the Second Boer War he commanded Catalonia, requisitioned by the Admiralty and used as a prison ship for captured Boers. He was Master of RMS Carmania from 1905 to 1914.

In October 1913, while eastbound, Barr responded to a wireless distress signal from the Volturno. Carmania was larger and less manoeuvreable than the other ships that arrived, so she stood off, deployed her searchlight, and directed rescue operations. 521 survivors were rescued.

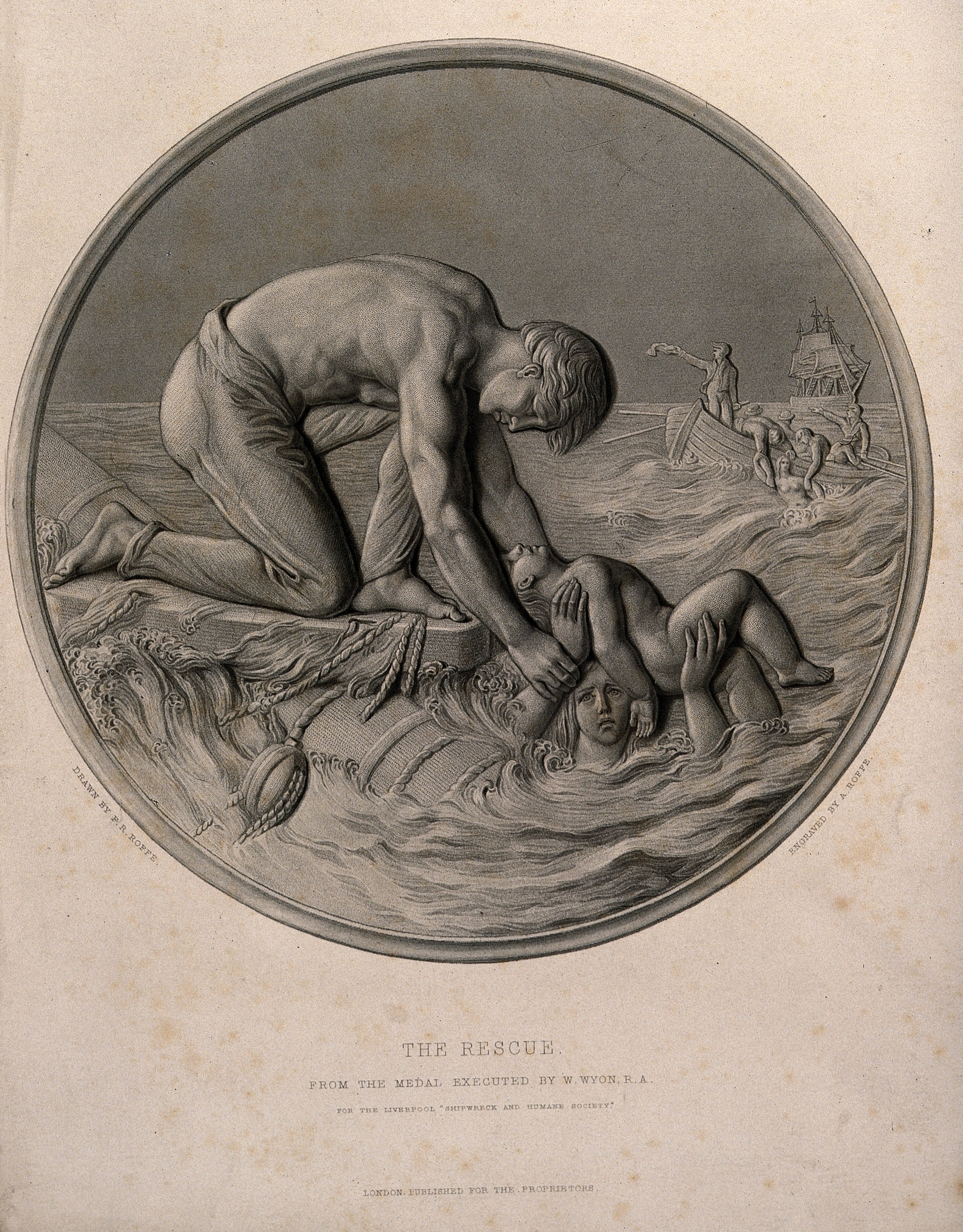
"The Rescue": the design for the obverse of the Liverpool Shipwreck and Humane Society's marine medals

A few weeks later the Liverpool Shipwreck and Humane Society awarded Barr its Gold Marine Medal for his part in the Volturno rescue. The Society awarded its Silver Marine Medal to Carmania's officers, and its Bronze Marine Medal and a sum of money to her boat crews.

On 7 August 1914 Carmania was commissioned into the Royal Navy as an armed merchant cruiser under the command of Captain Noel Grant, RN. Captain Barr was retained as navigator and advisor, with the acting rank of Commander, Royal Naval Reserve.

On 14 September 1914, while at sea in the South Atlantic, Carmania encountered and sank the German auxiliary cruiser SMS Cap Trafalgar, an Imperial German Navy auxiliary cruiser commanded by Korvettenkapitän Julius Wirth. For his part in that successful action, Barr was made a Commander of the Order of the Bath and was Mentioned in Despatches.

Released from the Navy on health grounds, he rejoined Cunard as a relief captain, and in 1915 and 1916 was master of the troopships RMS Mauretania and RMS Saxonia. By June 1916 he was master of RMS Carpathia. He retired from Cunard later that year, and died on 29 March 1937, at the age of 82.
