= SS Zeeland =

British and Belgian ocean liner

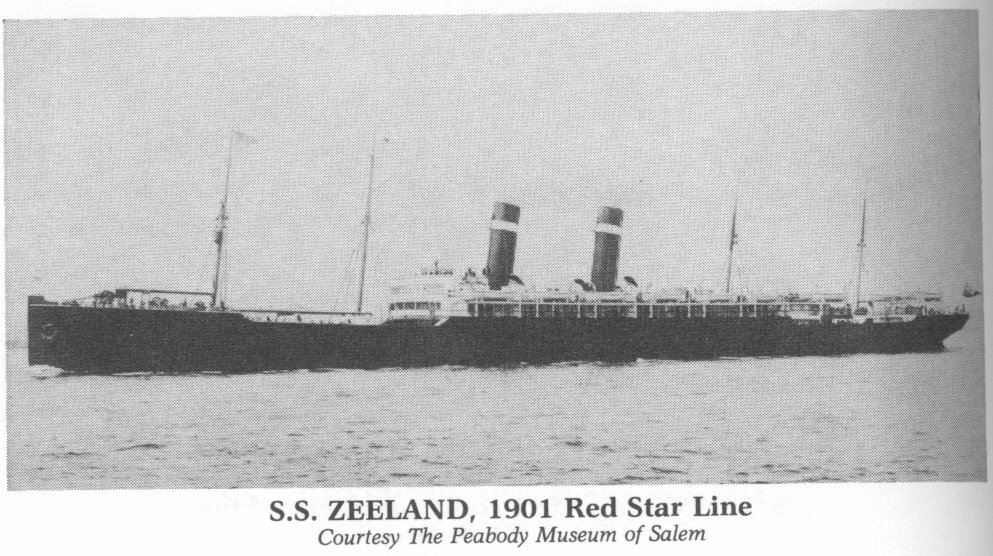
- SS Zeeland

History
- Name: 1901: SS Zeeland; 1915: SS Northland; 1920: SS Zeeland; 1927: SS Minnesota
- Owner: International Mercantile Marine Co.
- Operator: 1901: Red Star Line; 1910: White Star Line; 1911: Red Star Line; 1914: White Star Line-Dominion; 1915: International Navigation Co.; 1916: White Star Line-Dominion; 1919: American Line; 1920: Atlantic Transport Line
- Port of registry: 1901: United Kingdom; 1912: Belgium; 1914: United Kingdom
- Route: 1901: Antwerp–Dover–New York; 1910: Liverpool–Boston; 1911: Antwerp–Dover–New York; 1914: Liverpool–Quebec–Montreal; 1915: Liverpool–Halifax–Portland; 1917: Liverpool–Halifax; 1919: Liverpool–Philadelphia; 1920: Antwerp–Southampton–New York rerouted to Boston and passengers bused to New York, after quarantine due to outbreak on ship.; 1927: London–New York
- Builder: John Brown & Company Clydebank
- Yard number: 342
- Launched: 24 November 1900
- Maiden voyage: Antwerp–New York, 13 April 1901
- Fate: Scrapped at Thos. W. Ward Inverkeithing, 1930

General characteristics H.M.T. Southland
- Type: Passenger Cargo Vessel
- Tonnage: 11,905 GRT
- Length: 561.6 ft (171.2 m)
- Beam: 60.2 ft (18.3 m)
- Propulsion: two quadruple-expansion steam engines; twin screw propellers
- Speed: 15 knots (28 km/h)
- Capacity: Passengers (as built): 342 first class; 194 second class; 626 third class
- Crew: 121
- Notes: two funnels, four masts

SS Zeeland was a British and Belgian ocean liner of the International Mercantile Marine Co. (IMM). She was a sister ship to Vaderland and a near sister ship to Kroonland and Finland of the same company. Although her name was Dutch, it was changed during World War I to the less German-sounding SS Northland. She served for a time as a British troop ship under the name HMT Northland. Reverting to Zeeland after the war, the ship was renamed SS Minnesota late in her career. Zeeland sailed primarily for IMM's Red Star Line for most of her early career, but also sailed under charter for the White Star Line (later White Star-Dominion), the International Navigation Company, the American Line, and the Atlantic Transport Line, all IMM subsidiary lines. The pursers safe survived the scrapyard at Inverkeithing and after residing in a wardrobe for 80 years is currently on display in a local private home.

== Early career ==
In July 1899, the Red Star Line announced plans for the construction of four large steamers. Two ships, Vaderland and Zeeland at John Brown & Company of Clydebank in Scotland, and two others, Kroonland and Finland, were to be built at William Cramp & Sons in Philadelphia. After being launched on 24 November 1900, Zeeland made her maiden voyage from Antwerp to New York on 13 April 1901, sailing under the British flag.

Zeeland began regular service on the Antwerp–New York route sailing opposite of Vaderland, and when they were completed in 1902, Kroonland and Finland. In April 1910, Zeeland was chartered to the White Star Line for service between Liverpool and Boston, where she remained until September 1911. The following month, Zeeland was returned to the Antwerp–New York service for Red Star. In July 1912 the liner was reflagged as a Belgian ship; she remained on the same route, and continued sailing for the Red Star Line.

== World War I ==
After the August 1914 outbreak of World War I, Zeeland was reflagged as a British ship, and sailed from Liverpool to New York in September. Shifting to the White Star-Dominion Line, Zeeland first sailed from Liverpool to Quebec and Montreal in November, and from Liverpool to Halifax and Portland in December and January 1915. In early 1915, Zeeland, though her name was Dutch, was renamed to the less German-sounding SS Northland. Sailing for the International Navigation Company, the liner continued on the Liverpool–Halifax–Portland service through June before returning to the Liverpool–Quebec–Montreal route.

After a period when she was taken up as a British troop ship, under the name HMT Northland, the liner returned for service under the White Star-Dominion Line in August 1916. In April 1917, Northland began Liverpool–Halifax service, eventually making seven roundtrips on that route.

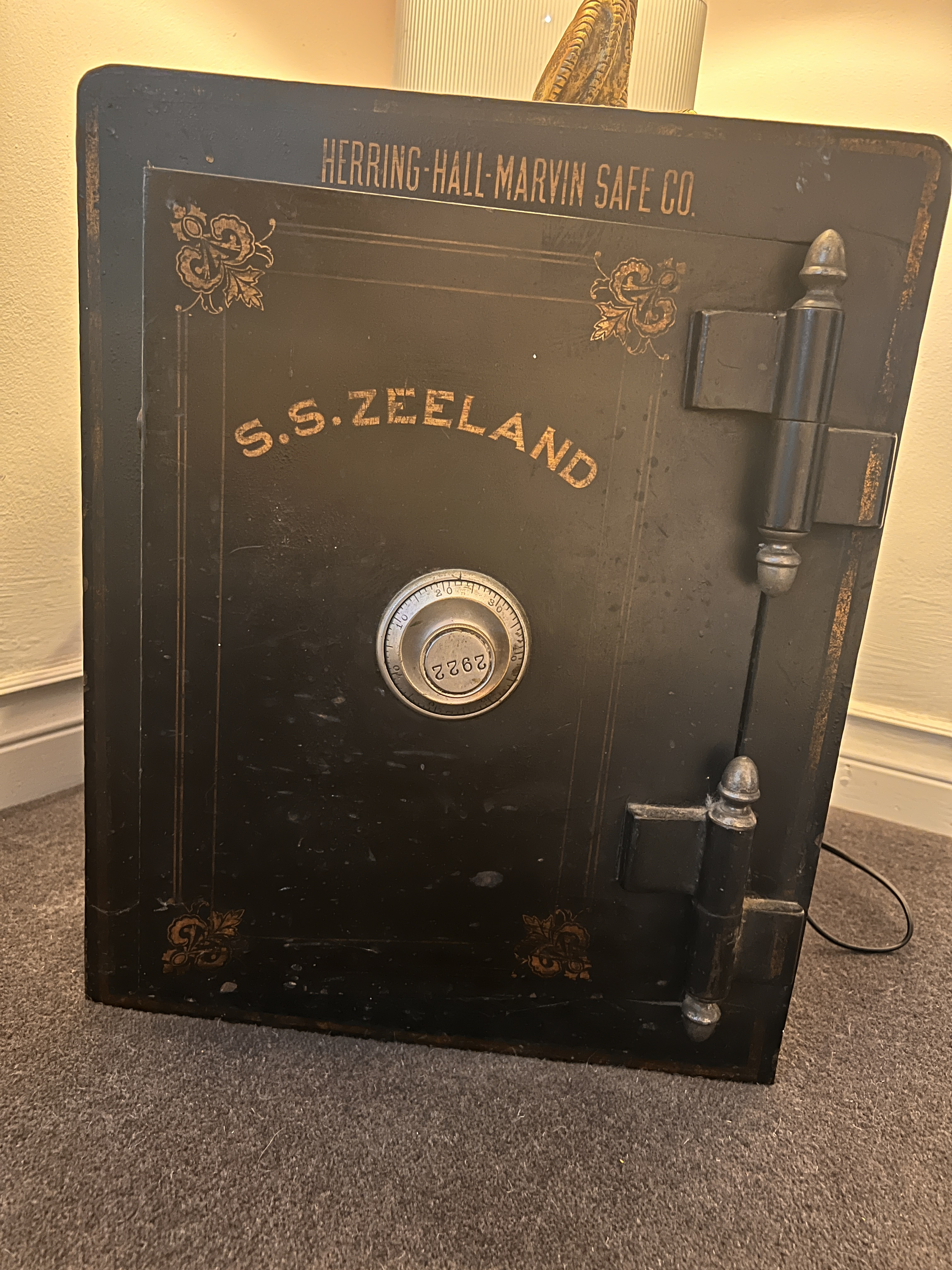
The Ships safe still survives today

== Late career ==
Northland began sailing from Liverpool to Philadelphia for the American Line through June 1919. After a refurbishment, the liner was returned to her former name, Zeeland; to the Red Star Line; and to Antwerp–New York service (with intermediate stops in Southampton) in August 1920. Transferred to the Atlantic Transport Line in 1927, the liner was renamed SS Minnesota and began tourist service between London and New York in April. After making her last voyage in September 1929, Minnesota was sold and scrapped at Thos. W. Ward Inverkeithing in 1930.
