= Panama Pacific Line =

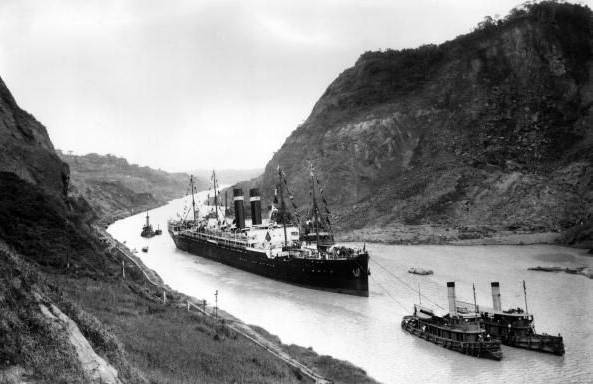
SS Kroonland transits the Panama Canal in 1915.

Panama Pacific Line was a subsidiary of International Mercantile Marine (IMM) established to carry passengers and freight between the US East and West Coasts via the Panama Canal.

== History ==
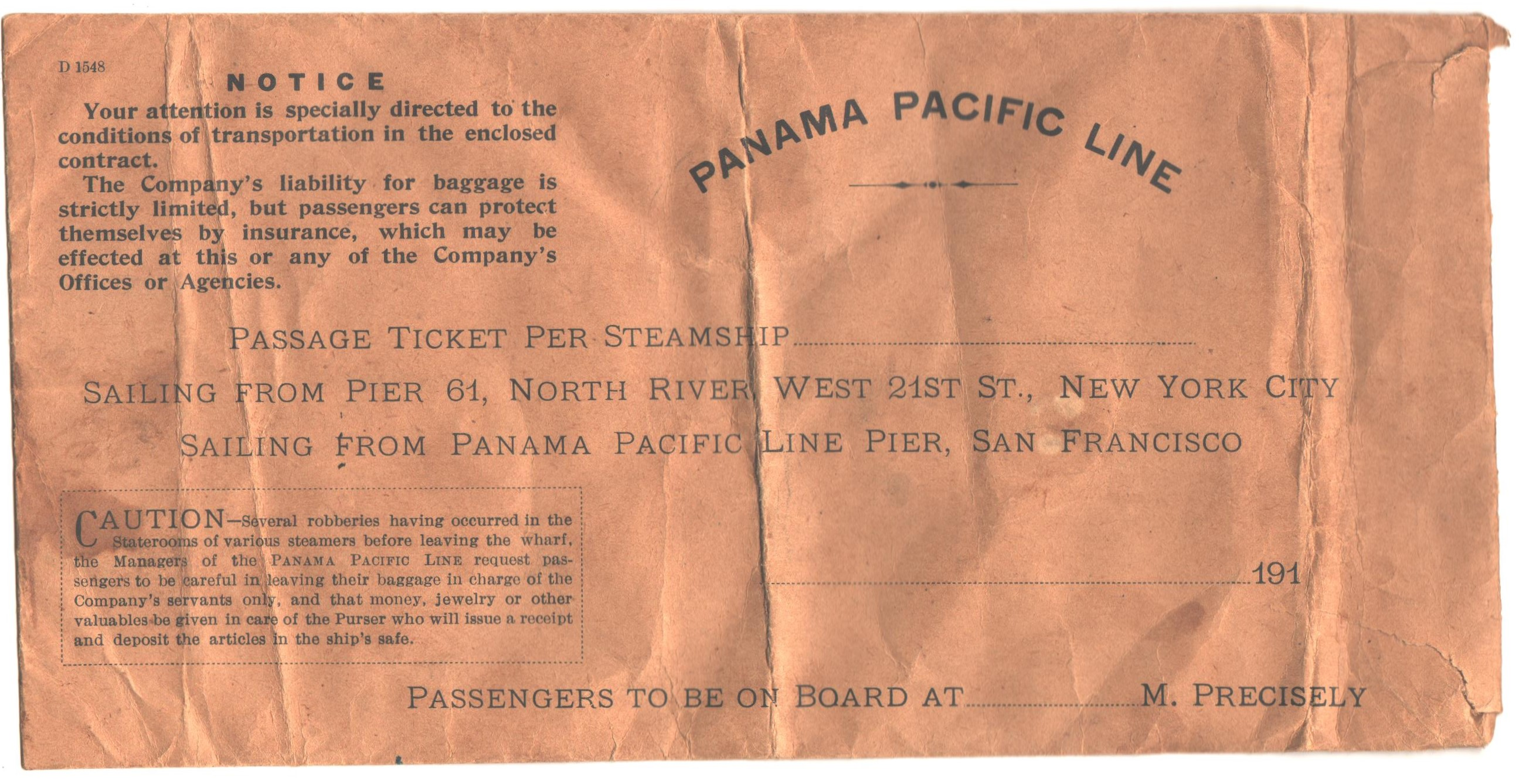
A Panama Pacific Line contract envelope, 1915

Although IMM had begun preparations for the intercoastal service as far back as 1911, service began in May 1915 with the former Red Star Line (another IMM subsidiary line) ships Kroonland and Finland. When landslides in September 1915 closed the canal for an extended time, Kroonland and Finland were reassigned to the IMM's American Line. The outbreak of World War I and its strain on international shipping caused the intercoastal service to be suspended.

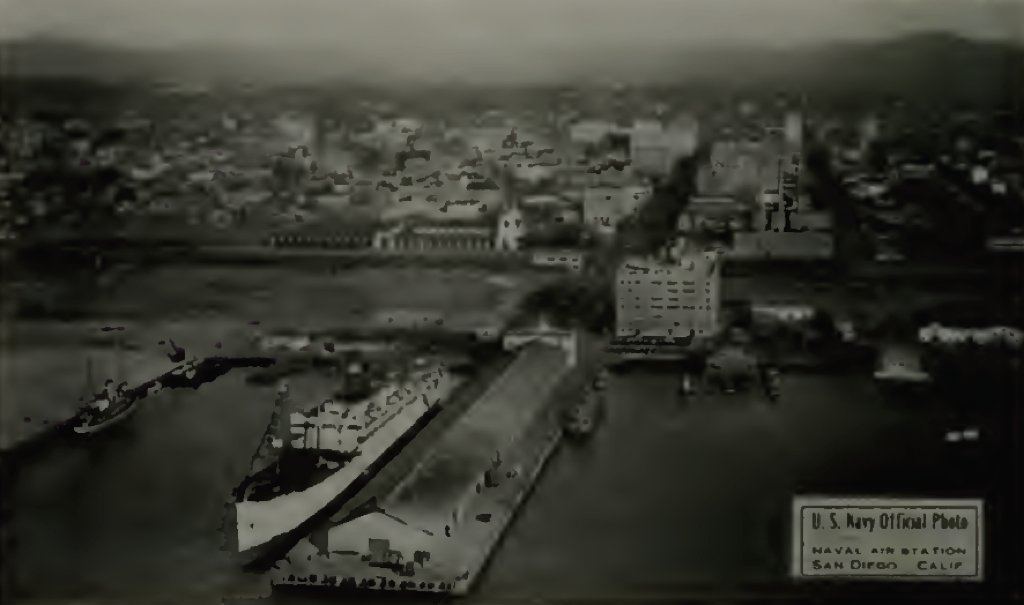
Manchuria at New municipal pier, San Diego, California 1925 where increased demand made San Diego a Panama Pacific port of call.

In 1923 Kroonland and Finland were returned to the reinstated intercoastal route along with the American Line passenger steamer Manchuria. Manchuria's sister ship Mongolia supplanted Kroonland on the route in 1925.

Three ships with steam turbo generators and turbo-electric transmission — California, Virginia and Pennsylvania — came into service in 1928–29, replacing all the other ships on the intercoastal service. These three newest ships included a drive-on service for passengers' automobiles, which allowed passengers to disembark with their cars at ports of call, such as Havana, a stop added in the early 1930s.

In 1936 California, docked at San Pedro, California, was the setting for the SS California strike, which contributed to the demise of the International Seamen's Union and the creation of the National Maritime Union.

In June 1937 the United States Congress withdrew all maritime mail subsidies, which by then included a total of $450,000 per year to Panama Pacific for its three liners. At the beginning of March 1938 the Panama Canal tolls were revised, increasing Panama Pacific's costs by $37,000 per year. As a result of these cost increases and continuing labor difficulties, Panama Pacific ended its New York – California service and took all three liners out of service. California was the last to leave service, joining Pennsylvania and Virginia in New York at the beginning of May 1938. The United States Maritime Commission took over the three liners and transferred them to Moore-McCormack Lines to start a New York — River Plate service under Franklin D. Roosevelt's Good Neighbor policy.

== Ships of the Panama Pacific Line ==
- SS California
- SS Finland
- SS Kroonland
- SS Manchuria
- SS Mongolia
- SS Pennsylvania
- SS Virginia

== Bibliography ==
- Bonsor, N.R.P. (1978) [1955]. North Atlantic Seaway. Vol. 2 (Enlarged and completely revised ed.). Saint Brélade, Jersey: Brookside Publications. ISBN 0-905824-01-6. OCLC 29930159.
- de la Pedraja Tomán, René (1994). A Historical Dictionary of the U.S. Merchant Marine and Shipping Industry: Since the Introduction of Steam. Westport, Connecticut: Greenwood Press. ISBN 978-0-313-27225-7. OCLC 29311518.
