= SS Volturno (1906) =

Canadian ocean liner; caught fire and scuttled in North Atlantic (1913)

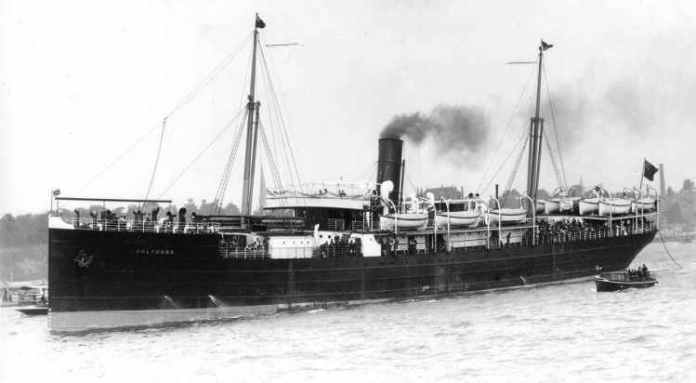

History
- Owner: Volturno Steamship Company (1906–09); Canadian Northern Steamships Ltd (Royal Line) (1909–13)
- Operator: D. G. Pinkney & Co (1906–10); H. W. Harding (1910–13)
- Port of registry: (United Kingdom of Great Britain and Ireland) London, United Kingdom (1910–09); Toronto, Canada (1910–13)
- Builder: Fairfield Shipbuilding and Engineering Company, Govan
- Yard number: 448
- Launched: 5 September 1906
- Completed: 1906
- Fate: Burned 9 October 1913; Scuttled 18 October 1913

General characteristics
- Type: Ocean liner
- Tonnage: 3586 gross register tons
- Length: 340 ft 0 in (103.63 m)
- Beam: 43 ft 0 in (13.11 m)
- Depth: 31 feet 3 inches (9.53 m)
- Propulsion: Steam triple expansion engines; two propellers
- Speed: 14 knots (26 km/h)
- Capacity: Passengers: 24 first class; 1,000 third class
- Crew: 93

SS Volturno was an ocean liner that caught fire and was eventually scuttled in the North Atlantic in October 1913. She was a Royal Line ship under charter to the Uranium Line at the time of the fire. After the ship issued SOS signals, eleven ships came to her aid and, in heavy seas and gale winds, rescued 521 passengers and crewmen. In total 135 people died in the incident, most of them women and children in lifeboats launched unsuccessfully prior to the arrival of the rescue ships.

== Description ==
Volturno was 340 feet 0 inches (103.63 m) long, with a beam of 43 feet 0 inches (13.11 m) and a depth of 31 feet 3 inches (9.53 m). She was powered by two triple expansion steam engines rated at a total of 450 nhp, 2,750 ihp. The engines drove twin screw propellers giving her a speed of 14 knots (26 km/h). They were built by Fairfield Shipbuilding and Engineering Company, Govan, Renfrewshire.

== History ==
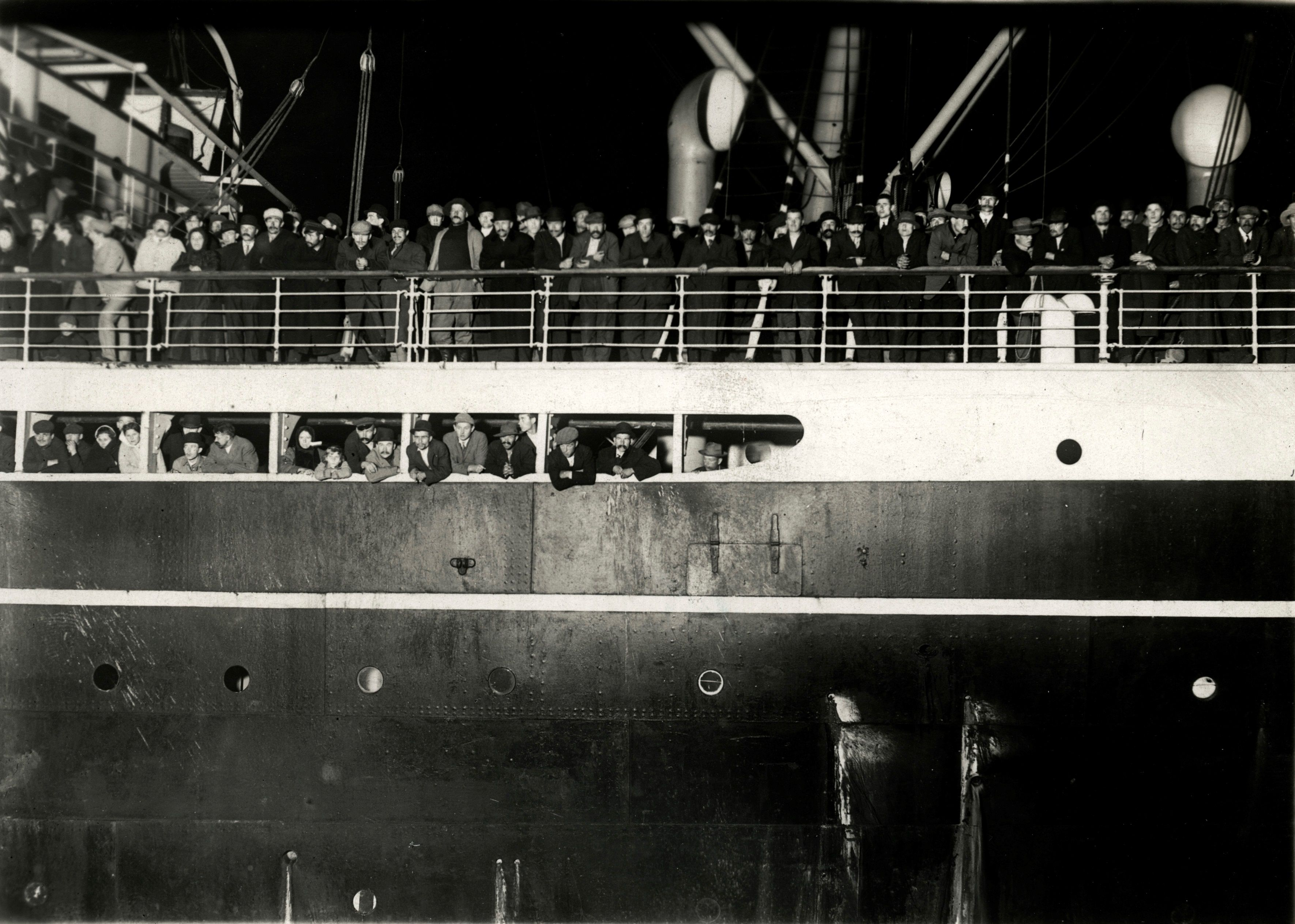
SS Volturno departing from Rotterdam (1913)

Volturno was built as yard number 448 by Fairfield Shipbuilding and Engineering Company. Ordered by Navigazione Italo-American, Naples, Italy, she was launched on 5 September 1906 and completed on 6 November. Her first owner was the Volturno Steamship Company, London and she was operated under the management of D. G. Pinkney & Co. Ltd., London. In 1910, she was sold to Canadian Royal Steamships Ltd., which traded as the Royal Line. She was placed under the management of H. W. Harding, London.

== Fire and sinking ==
Volturno, on a voyage from Rotterdam to New York City, was carrying a mixed load of passengers, mostly immigrants, and cargo that included highly flammable chemicals. At about 06:00 on 9 October 1913, it caught fire during a gale in the North Atlantic at 49°12′N 34°51′W. The cargo hold in the front of the ship was engulfed in flames. Shortly afterwards, some of the cargo exploded.

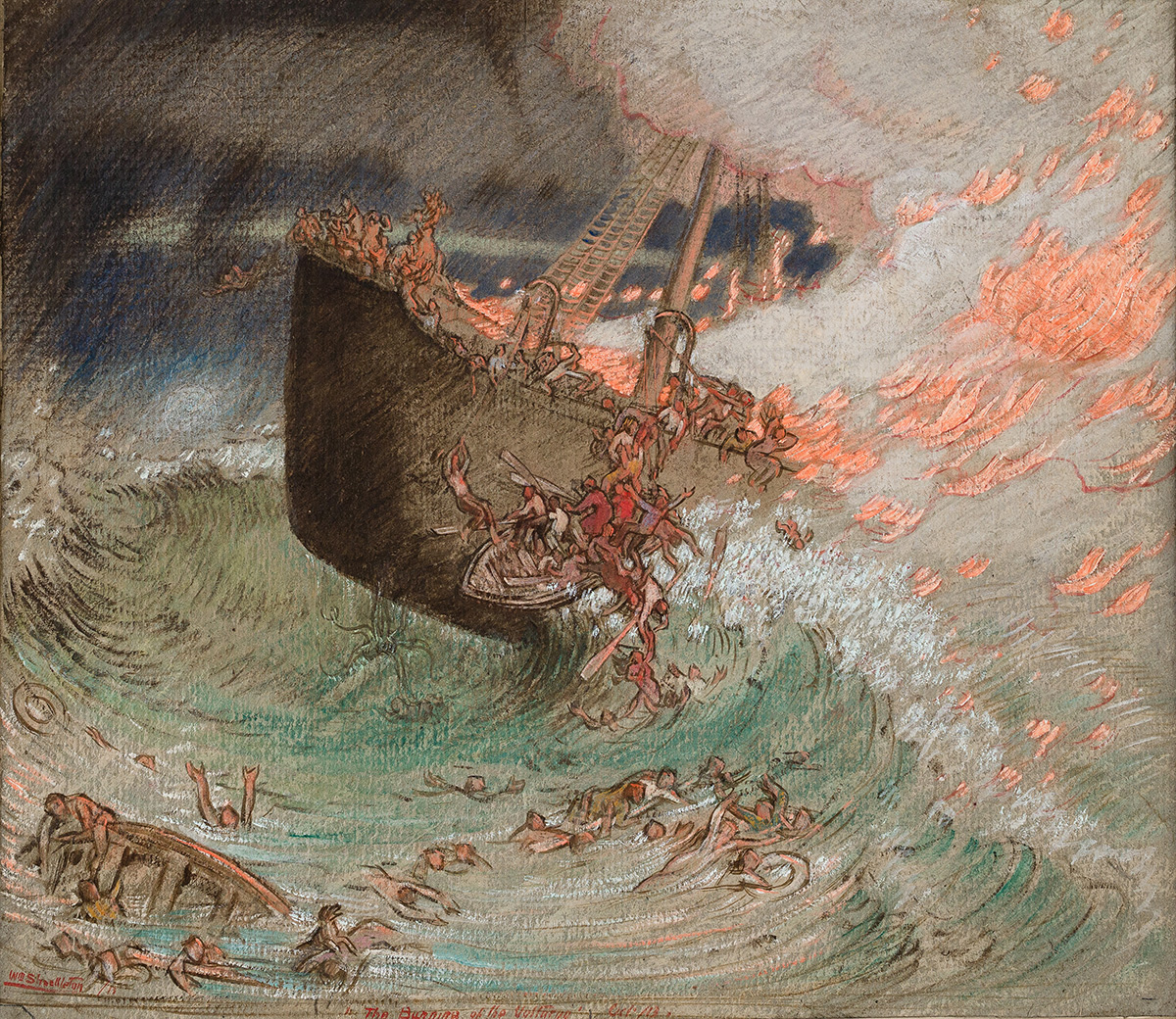
'The Burning of the S.S. Volturno'; undated painting by William Shackleton

The fire spread to the ship's coal bunkers, cutting power to the fire pumps. The crew fought the fire for about two hours but, realising the severity of the fire and the limited options for dousing it, Captain Francis Inch radioed an SOS. Eleven ships responded to the ship's reported position, arriving throughout the day and into the next. Meanwhile, several lifeboats with women and children aboard were launched; all either capsized or were smashed by the ship's hull, leaving no one alive from the first boats.

Captain James Clayton Barr of RMS Carmania, the first ship to arrive, at around noon, took command of the rescue effort. Barr had the other nine vessels form a "line of battle" and slowly circle the burning ship. Throughout the night of 11 October, Carmania kept one of her searchlights on Volturno, with another sweeping the ring of rescue ships to help them avoid collisions. According to one passenger, despite Carmania's efforts, two of the ships, the Red Star liner Kroonland and the French Line steamer La Touraine almost collided, coming within 15 to 20 feet (5 to 6 m). This was disputed by an officer on the Kroonland.

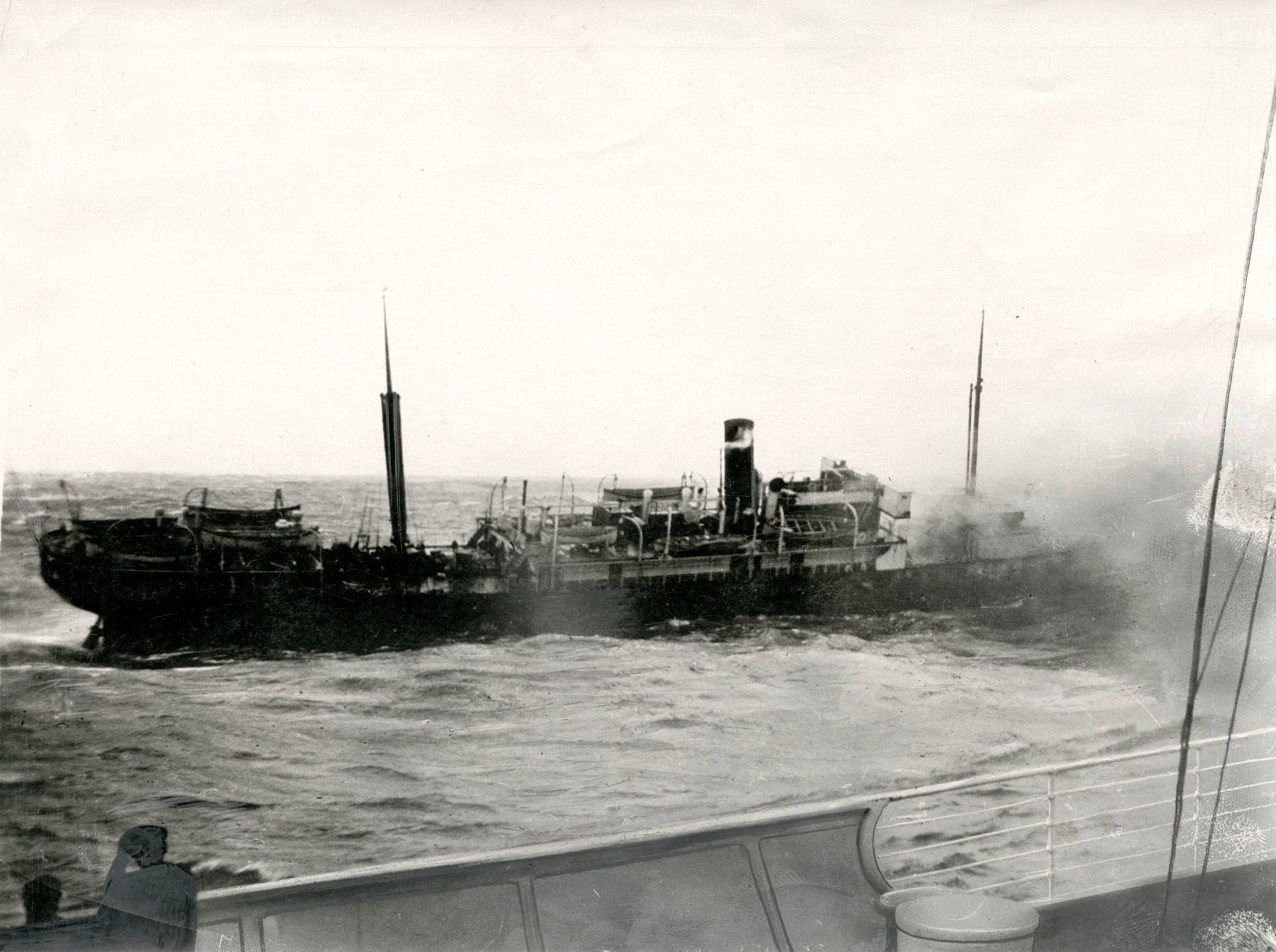
The burning SS Volturno during rescue operation

The rescue ships launched lifeboats of their own, but rough seas and the reluctance of Volturno's passengers to jump into the frigid water hampered rescue efforts. On board Volturno, the crew and some male passengers, unable to extinguish the fire, were at least able to keep it from spreading to the aft cargo holds over which the others on board were gathered. However, shortly before dawn, there was a large explosion, probably of the boilers. The rescuers felt that the ship, which had not been in imminent danger of sinking, would founder at any time.

In the early morning of 11 October, the tanker Narragansett, one of the eleven rescue vessels, turned on her pumps and sprayed oil on the sea to help calm the surface. The combination of the oil and the lessening of the storm allowed many more lifeboats to be launched.

With all lifeboats recovered by 09:00, the rescue ships resumed their original courses. In all, 521 passengers and crew members were rescued by ten of the eleven ships. The death toll was 135, mostly women and children from the early lifeboat launchings.

On the night of 17 October, the Dutch tanker Charlois, unaware of the events of the week before, came upon the still-smoldering hulk of Volturno. Charlois lowered a boat that stood by, attempting to hail any possible survivors on board. When day broke on 18 October, Captain Schmidt saw the full extent of the damage. Seeing that Volturno was a hazard to passing ships, he ordered Volturno's seacocks opened, scuttling the ship.

== Rescue ships ==
The following ships participated in the Volturno rescue:

- RMS Carmania, lead ship of rescue, rescued one man
- SS Czar, rescued 102
- SS Devonian, rescued 59
- SS Grosser Kurfürst, rescued 105
- SS Kroonland, rescued 90
- SS La Touraine, rescued 40
- SS Minneapolis, rescued 30
- SS Narragansett, rescued 29
- SS Rappahannock, rescued 19
- SS Seydlitz, rescued 46
- SS Asian, responded to the distress calls but did not participate in the rescue
- SS New York, was reported on the scene on 10 October but did not participate in the rescue

== Bibliography ==
- Spurgeon, Arthur (1913). The burning of the "Volturno". London: Cassell and Company. OCLC 8318646.
