= SS Vaderland (1900) =

Ocean liner

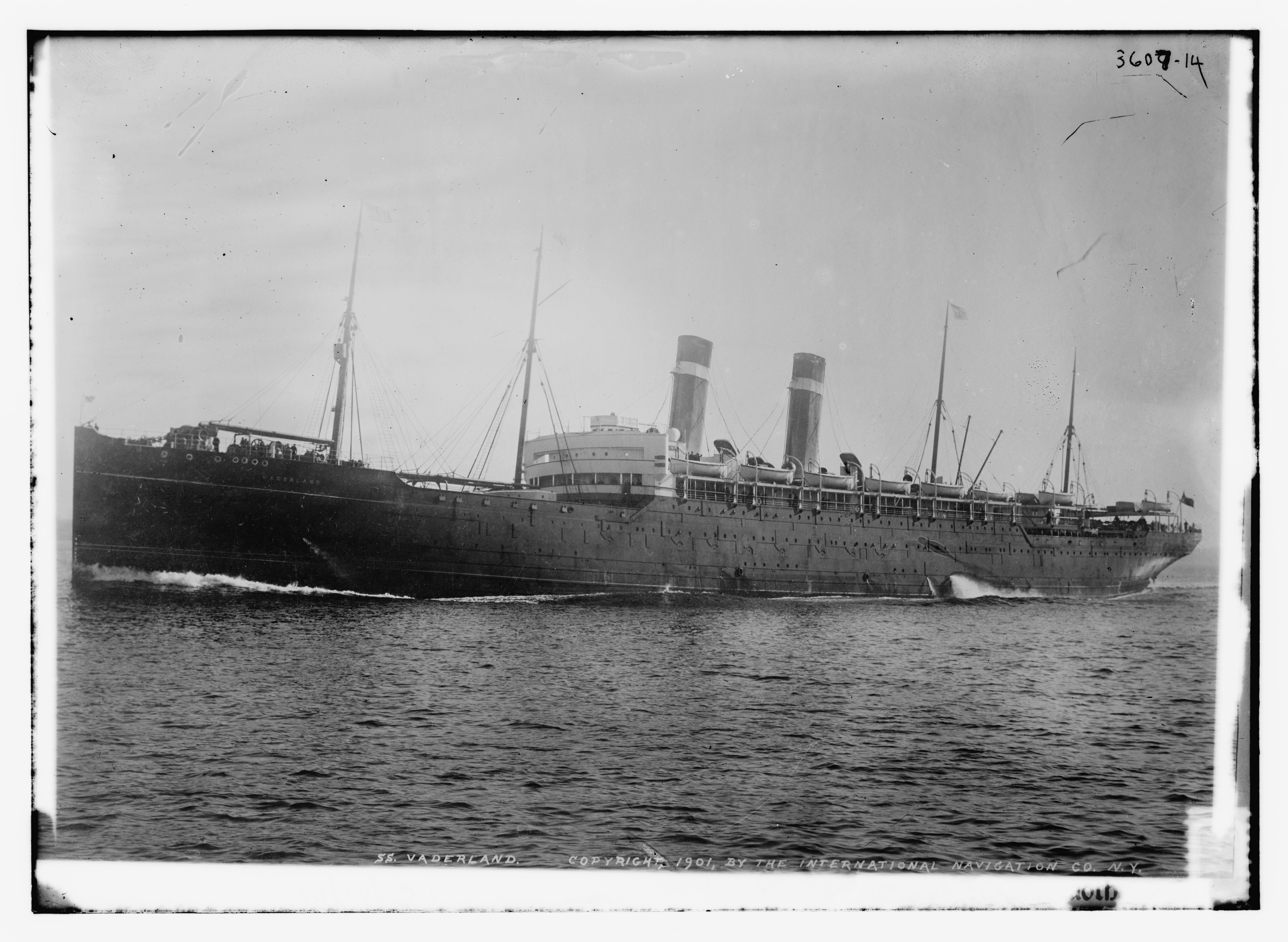
- Vaderland, seen in 1910

History
- Name: 1900: Vaderland; 1915: Southland
- Owner: International Navigation Company
- Operator: 1901: American Line (charter); 1903–1914: Red Star Line; 1914–1917: White Star–Dominion
- Port of registry: 1900: (United Kingdom) Liverpool; 1903: (Belgium) Antwerp; 1914: (United Kingdom) Liverpool
- Route: 1900: Antwerp – Southampton – New York; 1901: Southampton – Cherbourg – New York; 1903: Antwerp – New York; 1914: Liverpool – New York; 1914: Liverpool – Halifax – Portland, Maine; 1915: (troopship); 1916: Liverpool – Quebec – Montreal
- Ordered: July 1899
- Builder: John Brown & Company; Clydebank, Glasgow
- Yard number: 341
- Launched: 12 July 1900
- Maiden voyage: Antwerp – Southampton – New York, 8 December 1900
- Fate: Sunk on 4 June 1917
- Notes: Sister ship of Zeeland; near sister to Kroonland, Finland

General characteristics
- Type: Ocean liner
- Tonnage: 11,899 GRT
- Length: 560 ft 10 in (170.94 m)
- Beam: 60 ft 2 in (18.34 m)
- Propulsion: 2 × propeller shafts; 2 × quadruple-expansion steam engines
- Speed: 15 knots (28 km/h)
- Capacity: Passengers: 342 first class; 194 second class; 626 third class
- Crew: 121
- Notes: two funnels, four masts

SS Vaderland was an ocean liner launched in July 1900 for the Red Star Line service between Antwerp and New York. During her passenger career, the ship initially sailed under British registry, but was re-registered in Antwerp in 1903. Vaderland was a sister ship to Zeeland and a near sister ship to Kroonland and Finland.

After the beginning of the First World War, Vaderland was re-registered in Liverpool and converted to a troopship, ferrying troops of the Canadian Expeditionary Force from Halifax to Liverpool. While under the operation of White Star–Dominion in 1915, she was renamed Southland to avoid the German-sounding Vaterland.

In September 1915, Southland was torpedoed in the Aegean Sea by German submarine UB-14 with the loss of 40 men. The ship was beached, repaired, and returned to service in August 1916. While in service between the United Kingdom and Canada on 4 June 1917, Southland was torpedoed a second time, this time by U-70; she was sunk off the coast of Ireland with the loss of four lives.

== Early career ==
In July 1899, the Red Star Line announced plans for the construction of four large steamers. Two ships, Vaderland and Zeeland at John Brown & Company of Clydebank in Scotland, and two others, Kroonland and Finland, were to be built at William Cramp & Sons in Philadelphia. Owned by American Line and managed by International Navigation Co. Ltd. London, she was 11,899 gross register tons, and after modification provided accommodation for 342 first-class, 194 second-class, and 626 third-class passengers.

Launched on 12 July 1900, Vaderland began her maiden voyage on 8 December 1900 when she left Antwerp for Southampton and New York City. She was chartered to the American Line and made three -Southampton – Cherbourg – New York round-trip voyages between 11 December 1901 and 8 April 1902. On 16 May 1903 she commenced Antwerp – New York service under the Belgian flag, starting her last on 25 December 1914. During this service, she collided with the 43-gross register tonnage American schooner John A. Allen off Georges Bank between the North Atlantic Ocean and the Gulf of Maine on 22 July 1906; John A. Allen was lost, but all seven people aboard her survived. On 19 January 1907 she collided with the British steamer Naworth Castle in the English Channel off the Goodwin Sands; Naworth Castle sank. Forty-two members of the 1912 United States Olympic Team returned from Stockholm, Sweden, to New York City aboard Vaderland on 31 July 1912.

On 22 September 1914 Vaderland commenced Liverpool – New York sailings under the British flag and in December 1914 was chartered to White Star–Dominion for three Liverpool - Halifax - Portland sailings. In 1915 she was requisitioned as a troopship. In 1915 she was renamed Southland as the Dutch word vaderland was considered too similar to the German Vaterland.

== Mediterranean and first torpedo attack ==
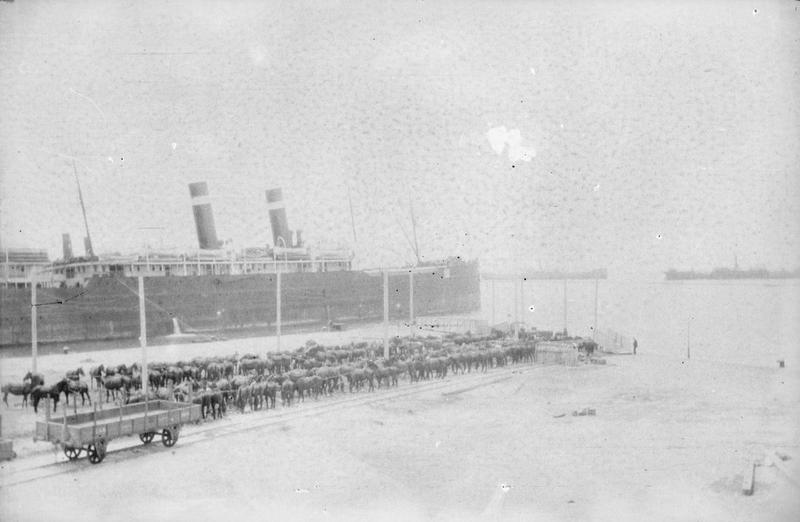
Southland at Alexandria, April 1915 embarking troops for Gallipoli

Southland was later used in the Mediterranean to carry troops of the 6th Essex regiment and two companies of l/7th Essex, transported from Devonport to Gallipoli from 4 July 1915 to 11 August 1915, and later from Alexandria, the Australian 21st Battalion with some troops from the Australian 23rd Battalion, General Legge and staff and 2nd Division Signals Company. During its sail from Egypt to Gallipoli on the 2 September 1915 at 9:45am it was torpedoed at right forward by the German submarine UB-14 30 nautical miles (56 km) from Lemnos in the Aegean Sea. The ship did not sink immediately, and was eventually beached on Lemnos, and all but 40 of 1,400 men were able to leave in lifeboats and were picked up by other transports and HT Neuralia, although mostly by HMS Ben-my-Chree by about midday though some troops spent up to 4 hours in the water. During the subsequent rescue operations Ben-my-Chree took on board 649 troops and 121 crew from 21 boats and rafts and provided medical attention as required until all were transferred to the troopship SS Transylvania in Mudros harbour. Southland eventually limped back to Mudros assisted by HMS Racoon and was repaired.

The sinking was reported as

A Splendid story is told of the sinking of the transport Southland in the Mediterranean Sea. When the torpedo struck the vessel reeled and the order was given to abandon the ship. There was never a cry or sign of fear. The Australian soldiers merely came briskly on deck singing 'Australia Will Be There.'

The troops all went to their stations and lowered the boats in an orderly manner. The subalterns searched the interior of the ship for wounded and finally came on deck to find only the general staff on board. They helped to lower the last boats and got into a half swamped one themselves. Fourteen persons were killed by the explosion and twenty two were drowned including Brigadier General Linton.

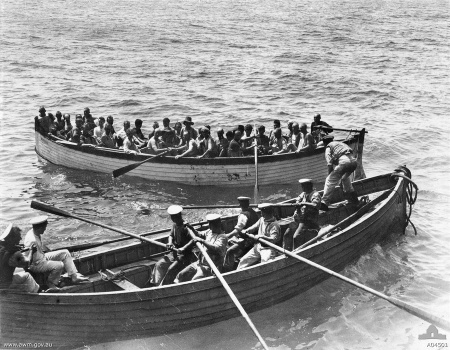
Survivors of HMT Southland after torpedo hit September 1915

A record of this event is recorded in the war diary of Captain Herbert Franklin Curnow:

Thursday 2 September

Up 6am. Drew 120 rounds of ammunition and iron and landing rations. Pulled into Lemnos and dropped anchor about 10am. The Military Landing Officer came on board, got my disembarkation return and meantime informed us that the Southland having on board 2 Aus Div H.Q 6th Inf Bge HQ., 21 Bt 1 Coy 23rd Btn. some A.S.C. A.M.C. & Signalling details had been torpedoed behind us. Later ascertained about 25 lives lost including Col Linton, Brigadier. Turned in soon after dinner.

However, a member of Australian unit reported one crew shot for behaving improperly. The remaining men and ship's crew were able to get to the Allied vessels later the same day. HMT Southland carried James Martin whose experiences, and those of his friend Cecil Hogan, were described in a book by Anthony Hill.

The sinking was depicted in the painting Sinking of the Southland by Fred Leist, who was appointed an official war artist in September 1917, and attached to the 5th Division AIF. Colonel Linton is buried in East Murdos Military Cemetery on the Greek island of Lemnos.

== North Atlantic and second torpedo attack ==
Southland was repaired and returned to White Star–Dominion for Liverpool–Quebec–Montreal service in August 1916, but on 4 June 1917 was torpedoed and sunk by the German submarine U-70 while 140 nautical miles (260 km) northwest of Tory Island off the Irish coast at position (56°10′N 12°14′W) with the loss of 4 lives.
