= SS Mongolia (1903) =

US-Passenger liner

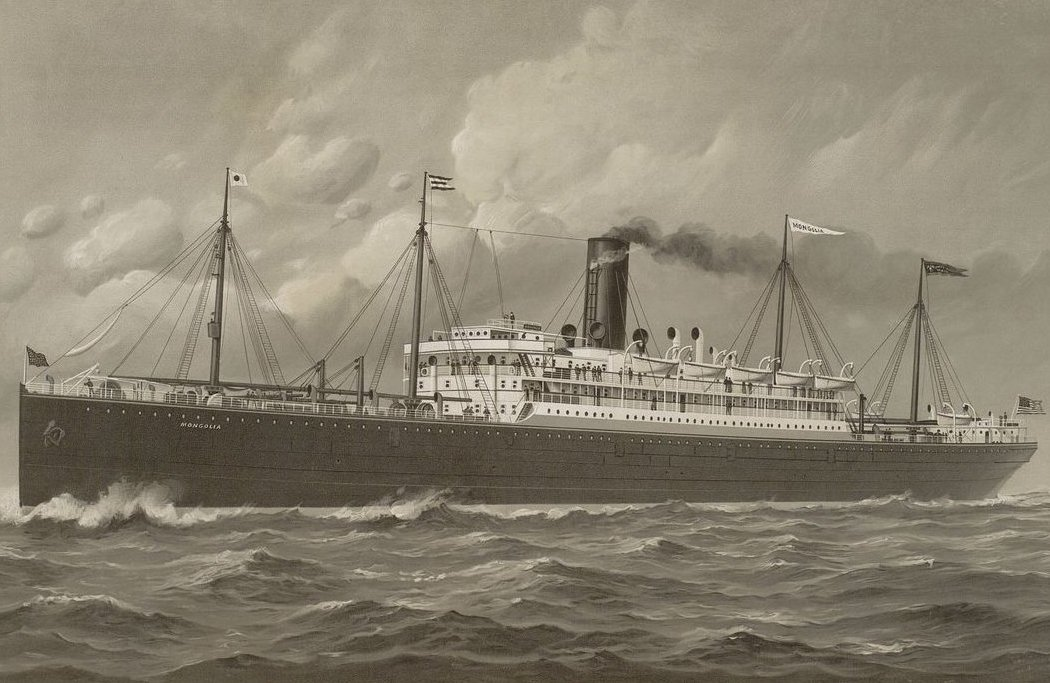
- SS Mongolia by Fred Pansing

History

United States
- Ordered: 18 December 1900
- Builder: New York Shipbuilding Corp., Camden
- Yard number: 5
- Laid down: 7 June 1902
- Launched: 25 July 1903
- Completed: January 1904
- Commissioned: May 1918
- Decommissioned: September 1919
- Maiden voyage: 7 May 1904
- In service: 1903–1946
- Renamed: President Fillmore (1929), Panamanian (1940)
- Fate: Scrapped 1946 (Shanghai, China)

General characteristics
- Type: Ocean liner
- Tonnage: 13,369 gross register tons
- Displacement: 26,500 tons
- Length: 615 ft 8 in (187.66 m)
- Beam: 65 ft 0 in (19.81 m)
- Draft: 33 ft 6 in (10.21 m)
- Propulsion: Scotch boilers, steam quadruple expansion engines (10,000 shaft HP at 80 RPM); twin screws
- Speed: 16 knots
- Capacity: 1,712 passengers (as SS Mongolia); 4,800 troops (as USS Mongolia)
- Crew: 130
- Armament: (March 1917 - September 1919) 3 × 6"/40 caliber guns with Navy gun crews

SS Mongolia was a 13,369-ton passenger-and-cargo liner originally built for Pacific Mail Steamship Company in 1904. She later sailed as USS Mongolia (ID-1615) for the U.S. Navy, as SS President Fillmore for the Dollar Line and as SS Panamanian for Cia Transatlantica Centroamericano.

== History ==
Originally laid down as Minnelora on 7 June 1902 in Shipway J at New York Shipbuilding in Camden, New Jersey for the Atlantic Transport Line, she was purchased by E. H. Harriman's Pacific Mail Steamship Co. for its San Francisco-Far East service, and renamed Mongolia. The 616-foot vessel was contract #5 for the young company, and the first passenger-cargo liner built by the firm. She was launched on 25 July 1903 and christened by Miss Lucy Bell Kennedy of Pittsburgh, Pennsylvania. A sister ship, Manchuria, was ordered at the same time and delivered three months after Mongolia. Both ships were used on the trans-Pacific service (Hong Kong, Hawaii, San Francisco) from 1904 to 1915. The accommodations of both ships reflected the importance of Chinese emigration to shipping lines of that era: 350 first-class, 68 second-class, and 1,300 steerage.

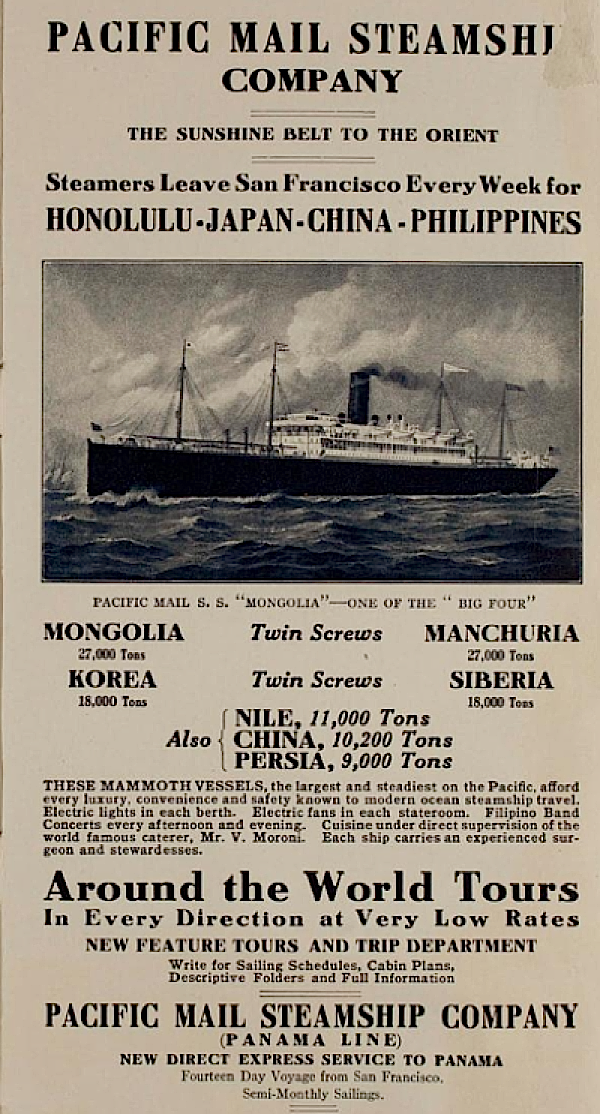
Pacific Mail Steamship Company advertisement in California Expositions brochure, 1915

In early August 1915, Pacific Mail announced it could not affordably meet the language clause of the Seamen's Act in the Far East and intended to cease commercial shipping operations there. Later that month, the company sold five of its liners, including Mongolia, to Atlantic Transport Line, for whom she plied the New York-London route.

In March 1917, following the German declaration of a submarine blockade around Britain, Mongolia was chartered as an Army transport and received a self-defense armament of three 6-inch (150 mm) deck guns manned by U.S. Navy gun crews. Mongolia became the first American vessel to test the blockade, using those guns to drive off (and possibly sink) a U-boat seven miles southeast of Beachy Head, in the English Channel. On April 17, 1917, Mongolia was attacked by a U-boat. The U.S. sailors on the Mongolia responded by firing back at the U-boat using the three deck guns. The U-boat's periscope and conning tower were damaged which forced the submarine to submerge. That was the first armed encounter for an American vessel after the US's entry to World War I. For the next year, Mongolia ferried American troops and supplies to Europe. Two American nurses, Clara Ayres and Helen Burnett Wood, were accidentally killed during one of these crossings, and another was wounded. During the afternoon of 20 May 1917, the nurses were on the deck of the Mongolia, observing the firing of the aft 6-inch gun, when they were struck by fragments of the shell's brass casing.

On 27 April 1918, the US Navy requisitioned the vessel, reconfigured her for greater troop capacity, and commissioned her on 8 May as USS Mongolia (ID-1615). In all, she completed twelve turnarounds at an average duration of 34 days and transporting over 33,000 passengers, before being decommissioned on 11 September 1919.

Returned to civilian service, Mongolia sailed the New York-Hamburg route under charter to the American Line. She was purchased in 1923 by the Panama Pacific Line and placed into service on its New York-San Francisco route (via the Panama Canal). In 1929, Dollar Steamship Lines acquired Mongolia and her sister ship Manchuria for its east-to-west round-the-world service, renaming them President Fillmore and President Johnson, respectively.

The former Mongolia sailed for only two years with the Dollar Line. With the onset of the Great Depression, she was laid up in New York, and when the Dollar Line collapsed in 1938 ownership passed to the newly created American President Lines. She never sailed under the APL pennant, however, and was sold in 1940 to Cia Transatlantica Centroamericana of Panama, which renamed her Panamanian. She was scrapped in Shanghai, China, 20 May 1946.

One of the deck guns from the Mongolia's World War I service, the Mark 4 6 inch, 40 Caliber Gun No. 155, is preserved in Gosport Park outside the Norfolk Naval Shipyard in Portsmouth, Virginia.
