= USS Salamonie =

Oiler of the United States Navy

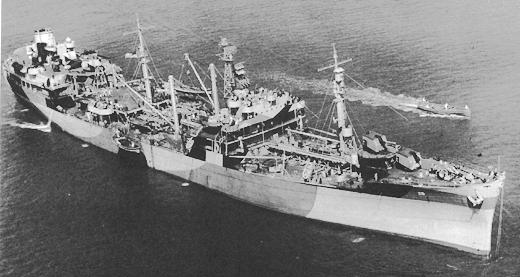
- USS Salamonie (AO-26)

History

United States
- Name: Esso Columbia; USS Salamonie
- Namesake: Salamonie River in Indiana
- Builder: Newport News Shipbuilding and Drydock Company, Newport News, VA
- Laid down: 5 February 1940
- Launched: 18 September 1940
- Sponsored by: Mrs. Eugene Holman
- Commissioned: 28 April 1941
- Stricken: 2 September 1969
- Fate: Sold for scrapping, 24 September 1970

General characteristics
- Class & type: Cimarron-class oiler
- Displacement: 7,470 long tons (7,590 t) light; 24,830 long tons (25,228 t) full load
- Length: 553 ft (169 m)
- Beam: 75 ft (23 m)
- Draft: 32 ft 4 in (9.86 m)
- Installed power: 30,400 shp (22,669 kW)
- Propulsion: twin screws, steam (450 lb_{f}/in^{2}), NSFO
- Speed: 18 knots (21 mph; 33 km/h)
- Complement: 304
- Armament: 4 × 5 in (130 mm)/38 cal. guns (4×1); 4 × 40 mm AA guns; 4 × 20 mm AA guns

Service record
- Operations: World War II

USS Salamonie (AO-26) was a Cimarron-class fleet replenishment oiler, named for the Salamonie River in Indiana.

== Construction and commissioning ==
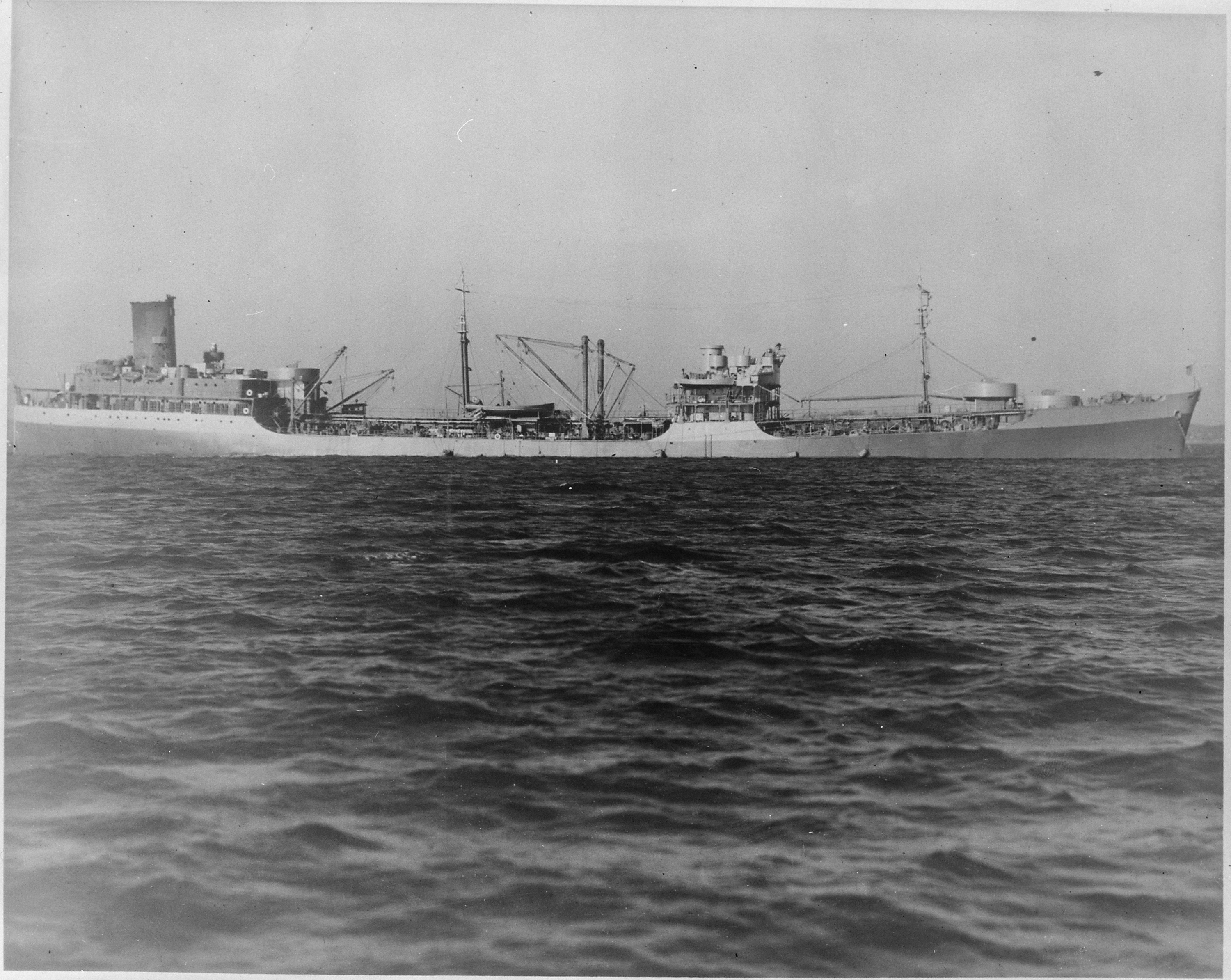
USS Salamonie in 1941.

Salamonie was laid down on 5 February 1940 under a United States Maritime Commission contract (MC hull 13) as Esso Columbia by the Newport News Shipbuilding and Drydock Company at Newport News, Virginia. She was launched on 18 September 1940, sponsored by Mrs. Eugene Holman. The ship was designated for United States Navy use on 20 November 1940 and commissioned into U.S. Navy service on 28 April 1941.

== Service history ==
=== World War II ===
After runs to various Atlantic Ocean ports in North America, Salamonie got underway for her first overseas voyage on 13 November 1942 in a large convoy headed for Casablanca in French Morocco in North Africa. Then, after making voyages in several convoys to the United Kingdom, she was overhauled in Norfolk, Virginia, and fitted with radar.

On 12 February 1943 Salamonie suffered a steering fault in the North Atlantic and accidentally rammed the troopship USAT Uruguay amidships. The tanker's bow made a 70-foot (21 m) hole in Uruguay's hull and penetrated her hospital, killing 13 soldiers and injuring 50. One soldier landed on the tanker's deck, where he was not discovered until Salamonie had changed course to Bermuda for repairs.

Salamonie departed for the Pacific Ocean via the Panama Canal on 8 July 1944 and reported for duty with Commander, Service Force, United States Seventh Fleet, at Milne Bay, New Guinea, on 23 August 1944. Salamonie joined the Leyte invasion force in Hollandia, New Guinea, on 8 October 1944 and later supported both the Morotai and Mindoro strike forces. She spent the final months of the war supporting Allied operations in the Philippines. A single Japanese plane made a strafing run on Salamonie on 5 January 1945, inflicting the sole war casualty aboard Salamonie during World War II.

Following the formal Japanese surrender on 2 September 1945, Salamonie provided logistic services to the Shanghai occupation forces along the Huangpu River in China.

=== Post-World War II ===
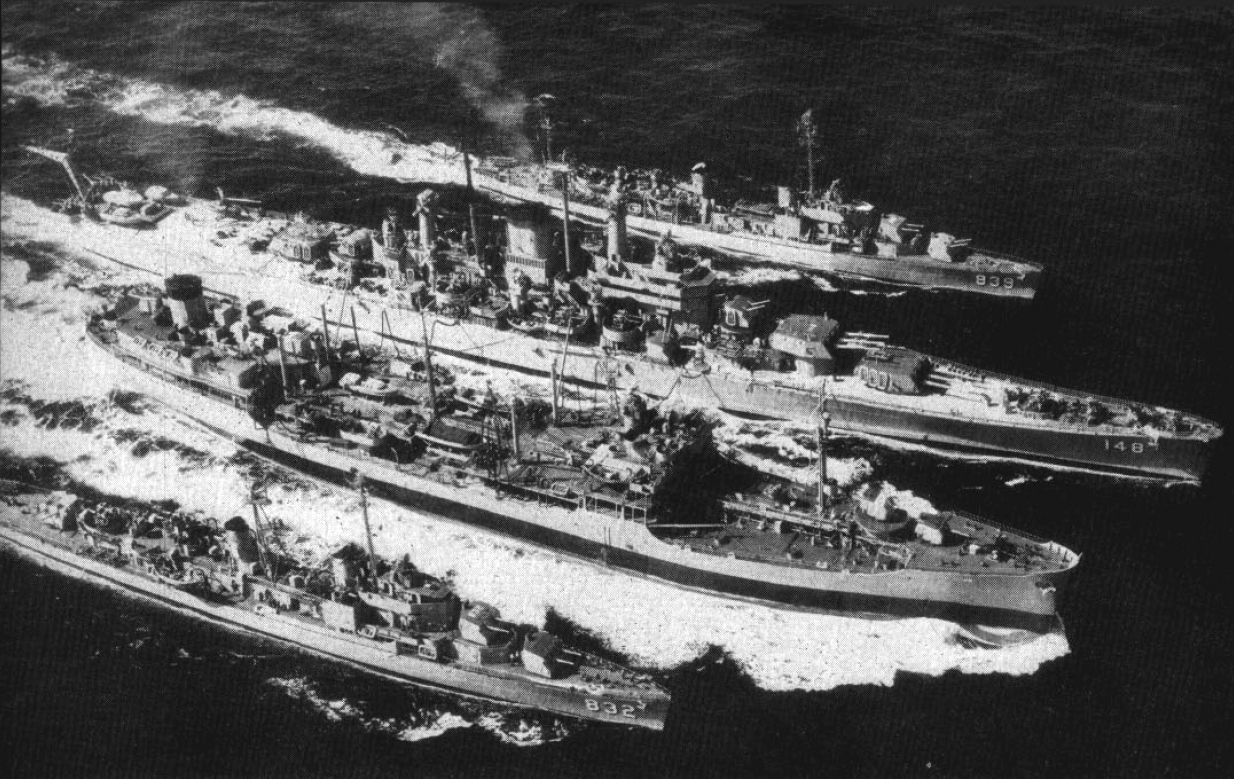
Salamonie refueling the heavy cruiser Newport News and destroyers Hanson and Power in 1953.

Early in 1946 Salamonie arrived in California for an overhaul at Long Beach Naval Shipyard, then steamed back across the Pacific. She spent the next two-and-a-half years shuttling petroleum products between Bahrain in the Persian Gulf and U.S. Navy bases in the Far East.

After returning to Long Beach, California, in December 1948, Salamonie was assigned to the United States Atlantic Fleet and arrived at Norfolk in May 1949. Western Atlantic and Caribbean operations with the United States Second Fleet and deployments with the United States Sixth Fleet in the Mediterranean Sea took the oiler through the 1950s and well into the 1960s.

In August and September 1958 Salamonie was part of U.S. Navy Task Force 88 during Operation Argus, which involved nuclear tests in the upper atmosphere.

Toward the end of the 1960s Salamonie was designated for inactivation. Placed in reserve on 23 August 1968 and decommissioned on 20 December 1968, Salamonie' was struck from the Navy List on 2 September 1969. She was transferred permanently to the Maritime Administration and laid up in the James River, where she remained until 24 September 1970, when her hulk was sold to N. U. Intershitra of Rotterdam, the Netherlands, for scrapping.

== Awards ==
- Combat Action Ribbon
- China Service Medal
- American Defense Service Medal with "A" device
- American Campaign Medal
- European–African–Middle Eastern Campaign Medal
- Asiatic-Pacific Campaign Medal with two battle stars
- World War II Victory Medal
- Navy Occupation Service Medal (with "ASIA" and "EUROPE" clasps)
- National Defense Service Medal (two awards)
- Armed Forces Expeditionary Medal (two awards)
- Philippine Republic Presidential Unit Citation (Philippines)
- Philippine Liberation Medal (Philippines) (two awards)
