= Newport News Shipbuilding =

American shipyard

Coordinates: 36.99208°N 76.44507°W

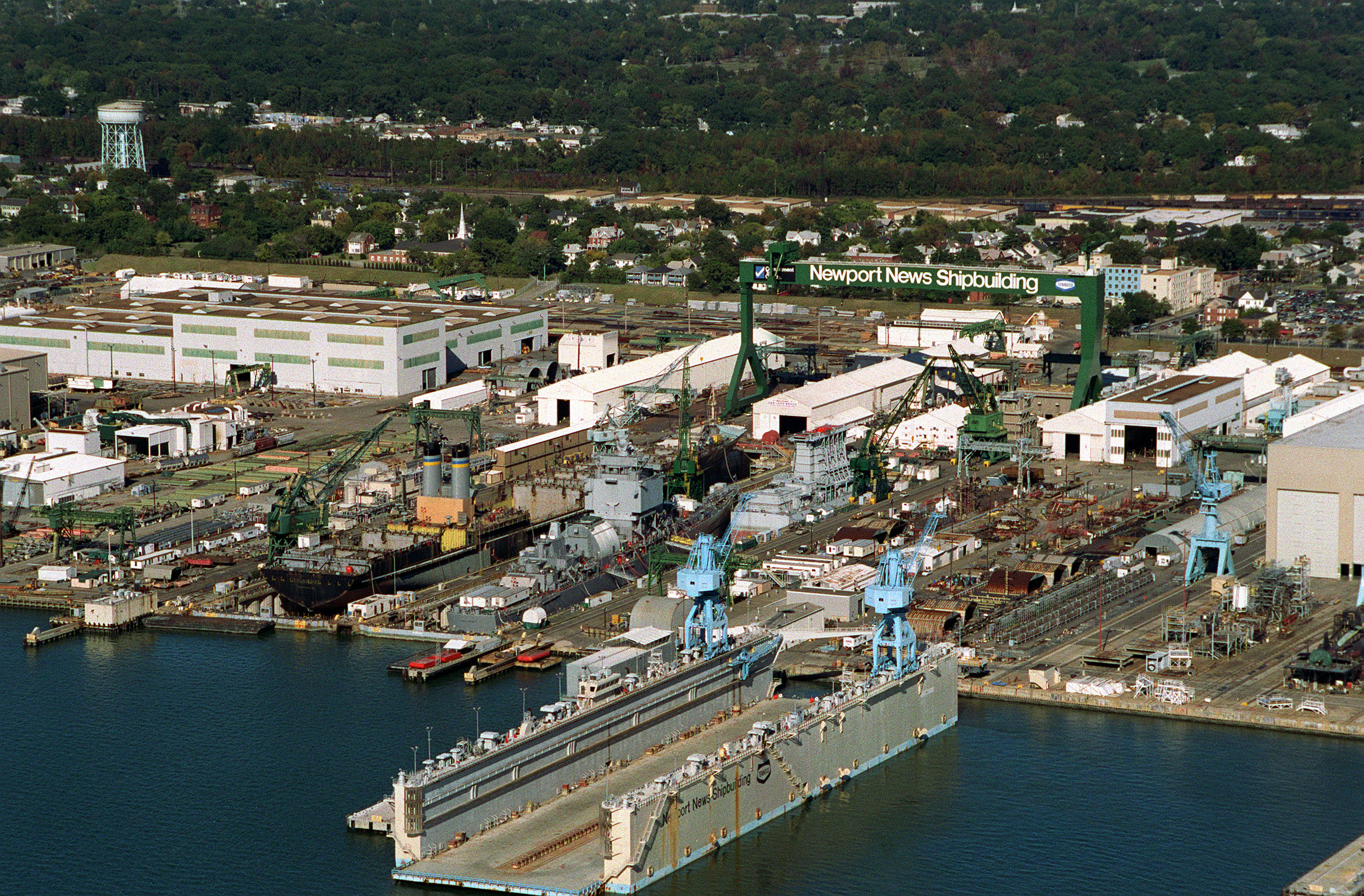
Aerial view of the Newport News shipyard in 1994. Visible in the drydocks are USS Long Beach and USNS Gilliland

Newport News Shipbuilding (NNS), a division of Huntington Ingalls Industries, is the sole designer, builder, and refueler of aircraft carriers and one of two providers of submarines for the United States Navy, founded as the Chesapeake Dry Dock and Construction Co. in 1886 and located in the city of Newport News, Virginia. Newport News Shipbuilding has built more than 800 ships, including both naval and commercial ships. Its facilities span more than 550 acres (2.2 km^{2}).

The shipyard is a major employer for the lower Virginia Peninsula, portions of Hampton Roads south of the James River and the harbor, portions of the Middle Peninsula region, and even some northeastern counties of North Carolina.

The shipyard is building one Gerald R. Ford-class aircraft carrier: USS Enterprise (CVN-80).

In 2013, Newport News Shipbuilding began the deactivation of the nuclear-powered aircraft carrier USS Enterprise (CVN-65), which it also built.

Newport News Shipbuilding also performs refueling and complex overhaul (RCOH) work on Nimitz-class aircraft carriers. This is a four-year vessel renewal program that involves refueling the vessel's nuclear reactors and performing modernization work. The yard has completed RCOH for six Nimitz-class carriers (USS Nimitz, USS|Dwight D. Eisenhower, USS Carl Vinson, USS Theodore Roosevelt, USS Abraham Lincoln and USS George Washington). As of September 2026, this work was underway for the Nimitz-class vessel USS John C Stennis.

On September 30, 2026 the USS Harry S. Truman entered dry dock to begin its RCOH period. The estimated cost is $5.1 billion dollars.

== History ==
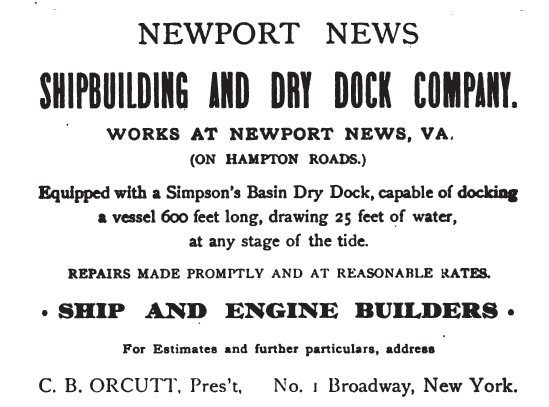
An 1899 advertisement for the Newport News Shipbuilding and Dry Dock Company

Industrialist Collis P. Huntington (1821–1900) provided crucial funding to complete the Chesapeake and Ohio Railroad (C&O) from Richmond, Virginia, to the Ohio River in the early 1870s. Although originally built for general commerce, this C&O rail link to the Midwest was soon also being used to transport bituminous coal from the previously isolated coalfields, adjacent to the New River and the Kanawha River in West Virginia. In 1881, the Peninsula Extension of the C&O was built from Richmond down the Virginia Peninsula to reach a new coal pier on Hampton Roads in Warwick County near the small unincorporated community of Newport News Point. However, building the railroad and coal pier was only the first part of Huntington's dreams for Newport News.

=== The shipyard's early years ===
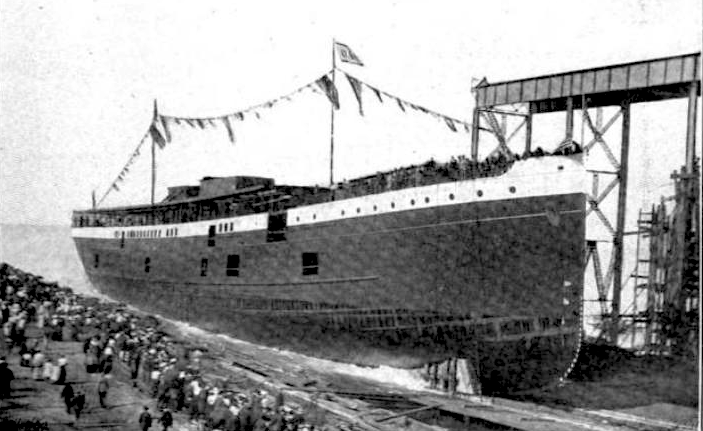
Old Dominion Line steamship Monroe launch 1902

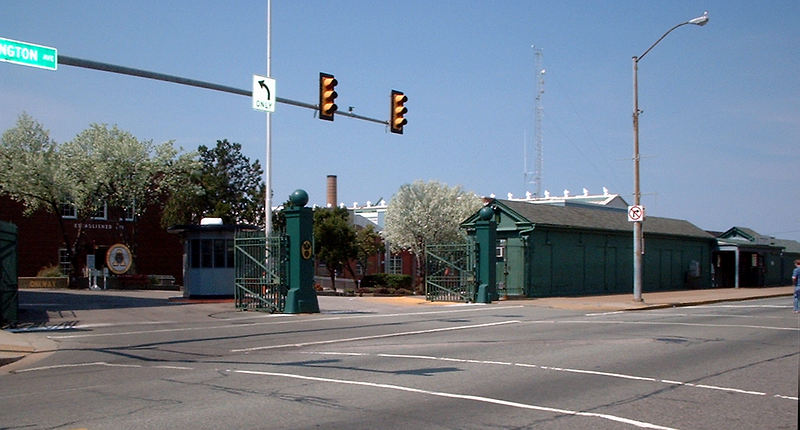
Main Gate, 37th St. and Washington Ave.

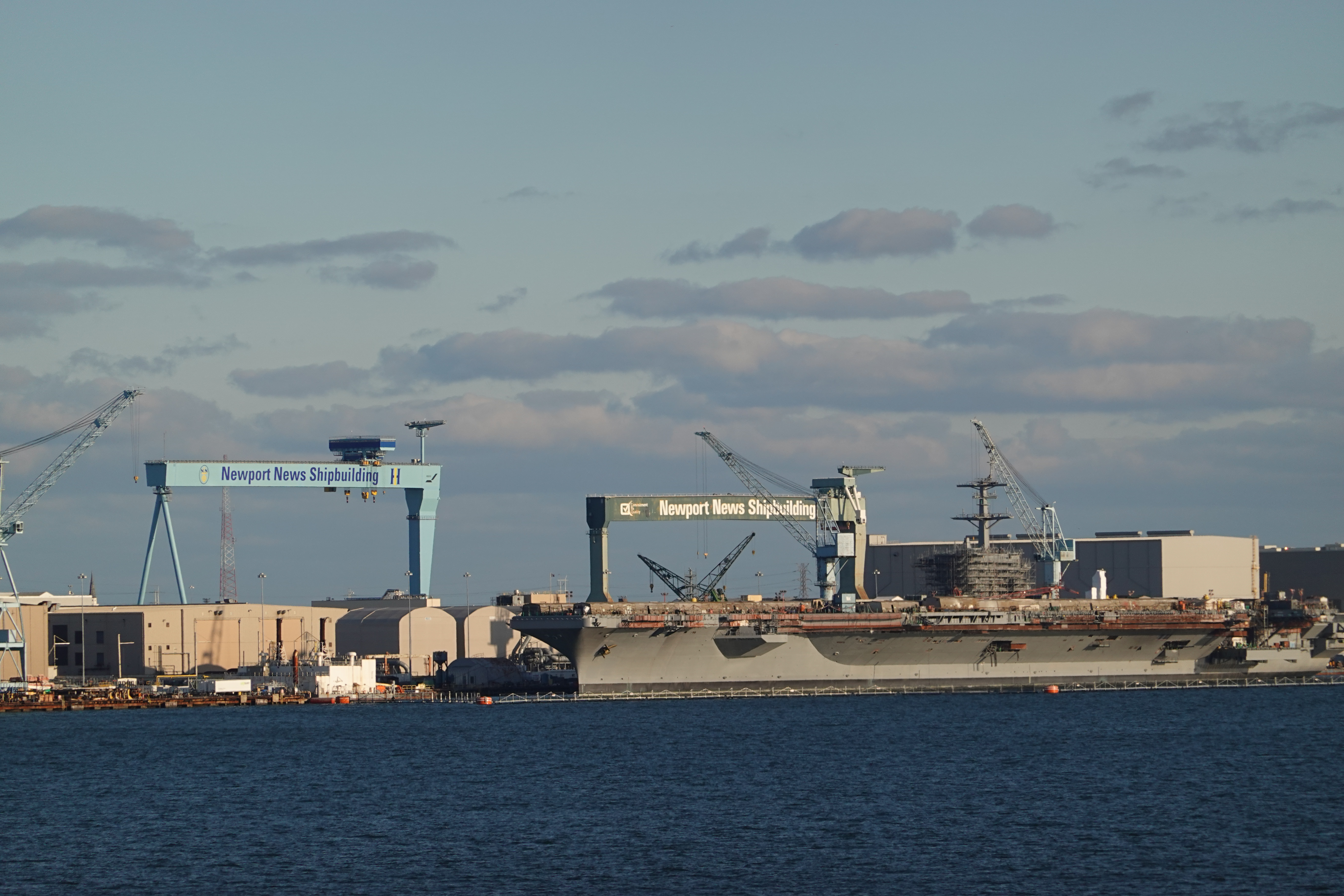
Cranes of Newport News Shipbuilding seen from the James River Bridge, 2020

In 1886, Huntington built a shipyard to repair ships servicing this transportation hub. In 1891, Newport News Shipbuilding and Drydock Company delivered its first ship, the tugboat Dorothy. By 1897, NNS had built three warships for the U.S. Navy: USS Nashville, Wilmington and Helena.

When Collis died in 1900, his nephew Henry E. Huntington inherited much of his uncle's fortune. He also married Collis' widow Arabella Huntington, and assumed Collis' leadership role with Newport News Shipbuilding and Drydock Company. Under Henry Huntington's leadership, growth continued.

In 1906, the revolutionary HMS Dreadnought launched a great naval race worldwide. Between 1907 and 1923, Newport News built six of the U.S. Navy's total of 22 dreadnoughts – USS Delaware, Texas, Pennsylvania, Mississippi, Maryland and West Virginia. All but the first were in active service in World War II. In 1907, President Theodore Roosevelt sent the Great White Fleet on its round-the-world voyage. NNS had built seven of its 16 battleships.

In 1914, NNS built SS Medina for the Mallory Steamship Company; as MV Doulos, she was the world's oldest active ocean-faring passenger ship until 2009.

=== Newport News and the shipyard ===
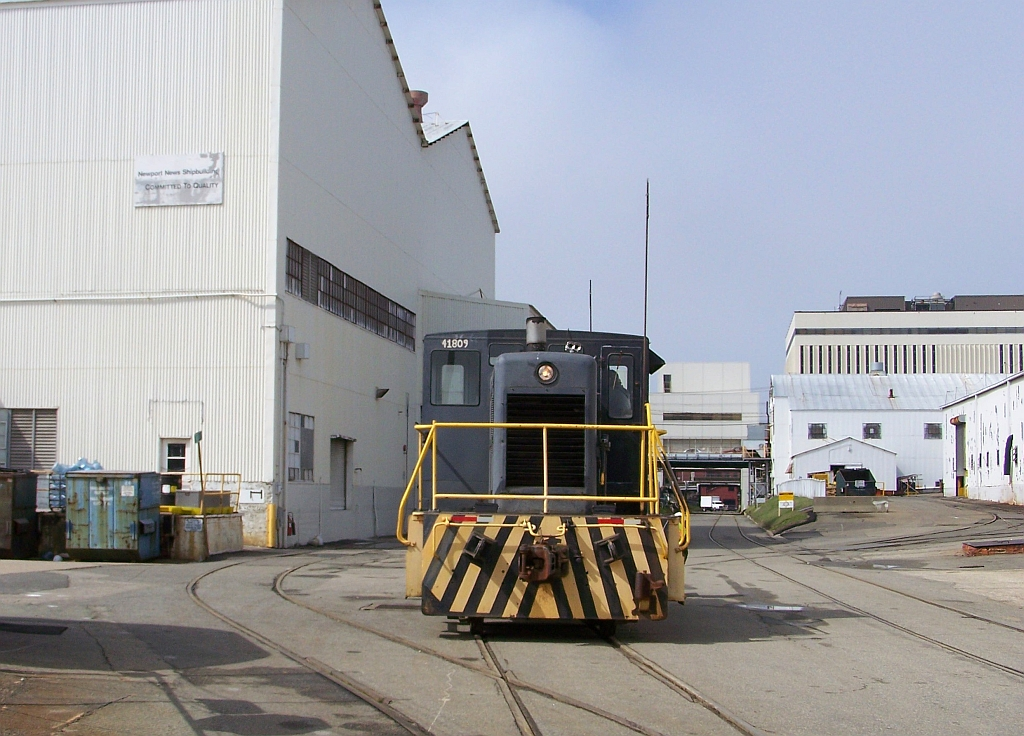
The shipyard's railroad system

In the early years, leaders of the Newport News community and those of the shipyard were virtually interchangeable. Shipyard president Walter A. Post served from March 9, 1911, to February 12, 1912, when he died. Earlier, he had come to the area as one of the builders of the C&O Railway's terminals, and had served as the first mayor of Newport News after it became an independent city in 1896. It was on March 14, 1914, that Albert Lloyd Hopkins, a young New Yorker trained in engineering, succeeded Post as president of the company. In May 1915, while traveling to England on shipyard business aboard RMS Lusitania, Hopkins died when that ship was torpedoed and sunk by a German U-boat off Queenstown on the Irish coast. His assistant, Frederic Gauntlett, was also on board, but was able to swim to safety. Homer Lenoir Ferguson was company vice president when Hopkins died, and assumed the presidency the following August. He saw the company through both world wars, became a noted community leader, and was a co-founder of the Mariners' Museum with Archer Huntington. He served until July 31, 1946, after World War II had ended on both the European and Pacific fronts.

Hilton Village

Just northwest of the shipyard, Hilton Village, one of the first planned communities in the country, was built by the federal government to house shipyard workers in 1918. The planners met with the wives of shipyard workers. Based on their input, 14 house plans were designed for the projected 500 English-village-style homes. After the war, in 1922, Henry Huntington acquired it from the government, and helped facilitate the sale of the homes to shipyard employees and other local residents. Three streets there were named after Post, Hopkins, and Ferguson.

=== Navy orders during and after World War I ===
The Lusitania incident was among the events that brought the United States into World War I. Between 1918 and 1920, NNS delivered 25 destroyers, and after the war, it began building aircraft carriers. USS Ranger was delivered in 1934, and NNS went on to build Yorktown and Enterprise.

In 1917, the year the U.S. entered World War I, the Newport News Shipbuilding & Drydock Company was contracted to build several ships for the U.S. military. In order to fulfill this contract, the company had to hire thousands of employees from across the country. However, a large problem arose: the city of Newport News did not have the housing to support this large influx of its population. This led to the creation of Hilton Village, a neighborhood still found in Newport News, Virginia, today, that was created to house these workers.

=== Ocean liners ===
After World War I, NNS completed a major reconditioning and refurbishment of the ocean liner SS Leviathan. Before the war, she had been the German liner Vaterland, but the start of hostilities found her laid up in New York Harbor and she had been seized by the U.S. government in 1917 and converted into a troopship. War duty and age meant that all wiring, plumbing, and interior layouts were stripped and redesigned while her hull was strengthened and her boilers converted from coal to oil while being refurbished. Virtually a new ship emerged from NNS in 1923, and SS Leviathan became the flagship of United States Lines.

In 1927, NNS launched the world's first significant turbo-electric ocean liner: Panama Pacific Line's 17,833 GRT SS California. At the time, she was also the largest merchant ship yet built in the United States, although she was a modest size compared with the biggest European liners of her era. NNS launched California's sister ships Virginia in 1928 and Pennsylvania in 1929. NNS followed them by launching two even larger turbo-electric liners for Dollar Steamship Company: the 21,936 GRT SS President Hoover in 1930, followed by her sister President Coolidge in 1931. SS America was launched in 1939 and entered service with United States Lines shortly before World War II but soon returned to the shipyard for conversion to a troopship, USS West Point.

=== Navy orders before and during World War II ===
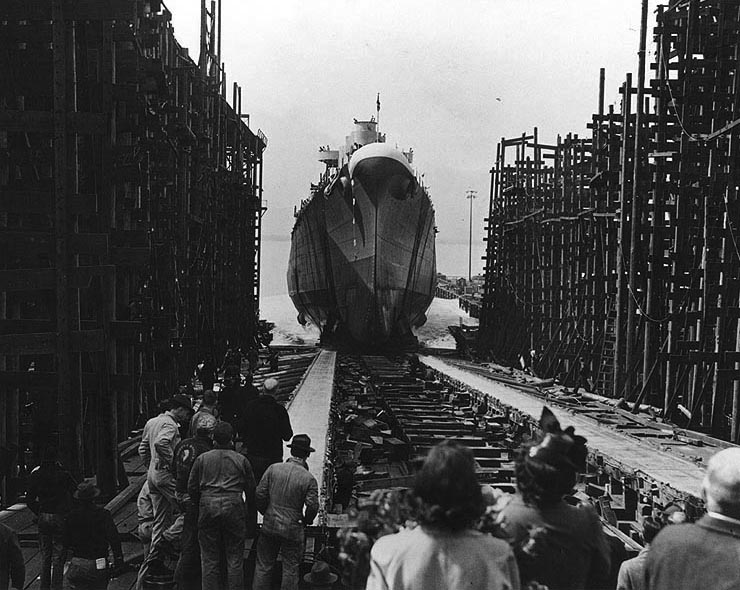
The newly built USS Birmingham is launched from the Newport News yards in 1942

By 1940, the Navy had ordered a battleship, seven more aircraft carriers and four cruisers. During World War II, NNS built ships as part of the U.S. government's Emergency Shipbuilding Program, and swiftly filled requests for "Liberty ships" that were needed during the war. It founded the North Carolina Shipbuilding Company, an emergency yard on the banks of the Cape Fear River and launched its first Liberty ship before the end of 1941, building 243 ships in all, including 186 Libertys. For its contributions during the war, the Navy awarded the company its "E" pennant for excellence in shipbuilding. NNS ranked 23rd among United States corporations in the value of wartime production contracts.

=== Post-war era ===
In the post-war years, NNS built the passenger liner SS United States, which set a transatlantic speed record that still stands today. In 1954, NNS, Westinghouse and the U.S. Navy developed and built a prototype nuclear reactor for a carrier propulsion system. NNS designed USS Enterprise in 1960. In 1959, NNS launched its first nuclear-powered submarine, USS Robert E. Lee.

In April 1966, the yard reached an agreement to address its policy of racial discrimination. Although the area has a large Black population, the Equal Employment Opportunity Commission found that only 32 of the almost 2,000 supervisors at the facility were Black. The most recent apprentice class of over 500 had only six Blacks. The shipyard agreed to provide promotions and pay raises to Blacks who had been discriminated against and to provide accelerated promotion to qualified Blacks.

In the 1970s, NNS launched two of the largest tankers ever built in the Western Hemisphere and also constructed three liquefied natural gas carriers – at over 390,000 deadweight tons, the largest ever built in the United States. NNS and Westinghouse Electric Company jointly formed Offshore Power Systems to build floating nuclear power plants for Public Service Electric and Gas Company.

In the 1980s, NNS produced a variety of Navy products, including Nimitz-class nuclear aircraft carriers and Los Angeles-class nuclear attack submarines. Since 1999, the shipyard has only produced warships for the Navy.

=== Submarine building problems ===
In 2007, the U.S. Navy found that workers had used the incorrect metal to fuse together pipes and joints on submarines under construction and this could have eventually led to cracking and leaks. In 2009, it was found that bolts and fasteners in weapons-handling systems on four Navy submarines—New Mexico, North Carolina, Missouri, and California—were installed incorrectly, delaying the launching of the boats while the problems were corrected.

=== Mergers, realignment, and spin-off ===
In 1968, Newport News merged with Tenneco Corporation. In 1996, Tenneco initiated a spinoff of Newport News into an independent company (Newport News Shipbuilding). In 2001, General Dynamics made a second bid to purchase the company after a failed bid in 1999. Such a merger would have eliminated competition for the production of Virginia-class submarines, which have only been made by Newport News and GD subsidiary Electric Boat. Northrop Grumman matched GD with a similar bid, and following a Department of Justice anti-trust lawsuit to block GD's bid, GD called off their bid. Now as the sole bidder, Northrop Grumman purchased the company for $2.6 billion and renamed it "Northrop Grumman Newport News". This division was merged with Northrop Grumman Ship Systems in 2008 and given the name "Northrop Grumman Shipbuilding". Three years later, the company was spun off as Huntington Ingalls Industries, Inc., which trades under the symbol HII on the New York Stock Exchange.

=== Presidents ===
- Matt Mulherin (2011–2017)
- Jennifer Boykin (2017–2024)
- Kari Wilkinson (2024–present)

== Ships built ==
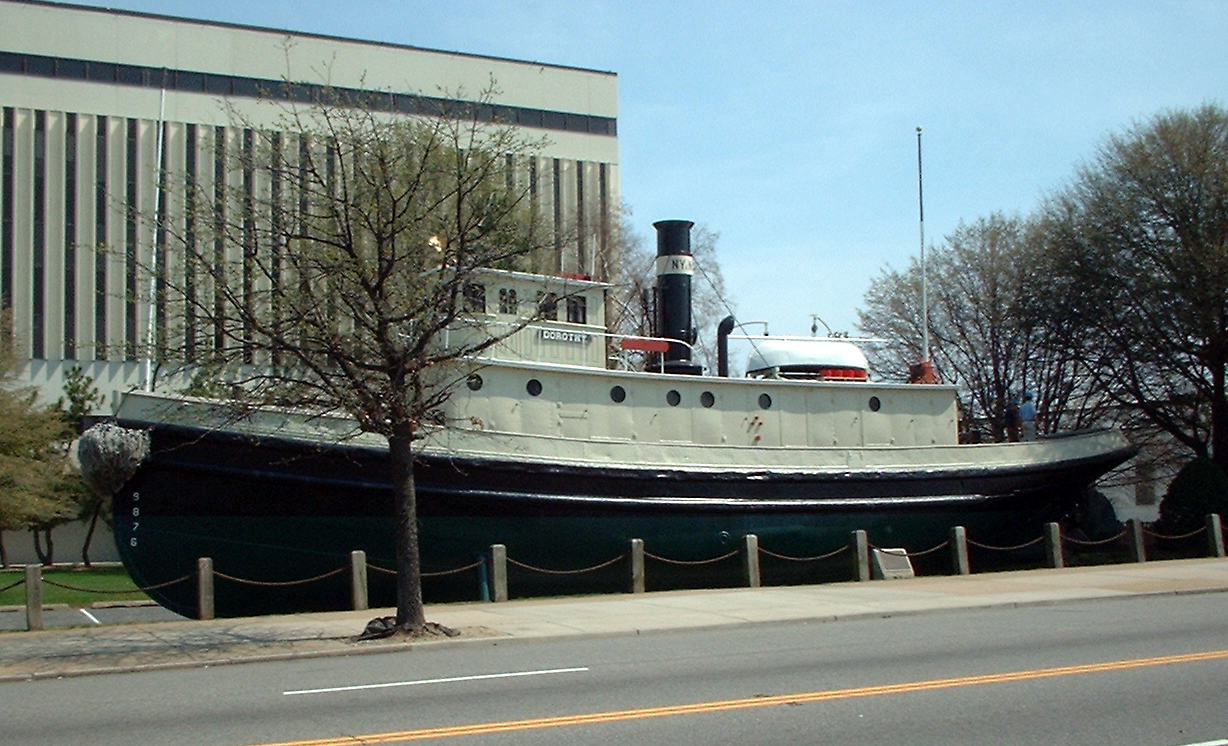
Dorothy

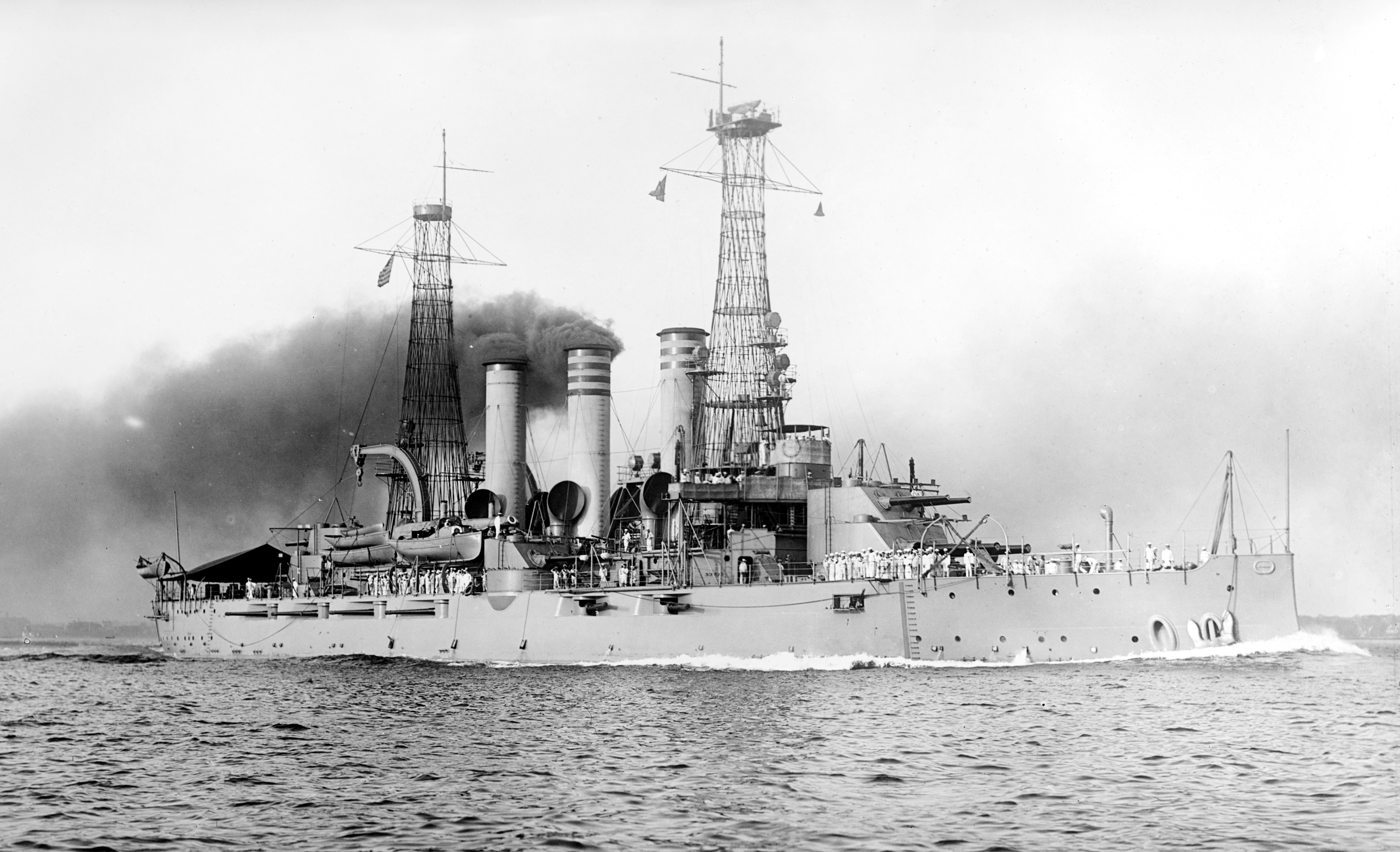
Virginia

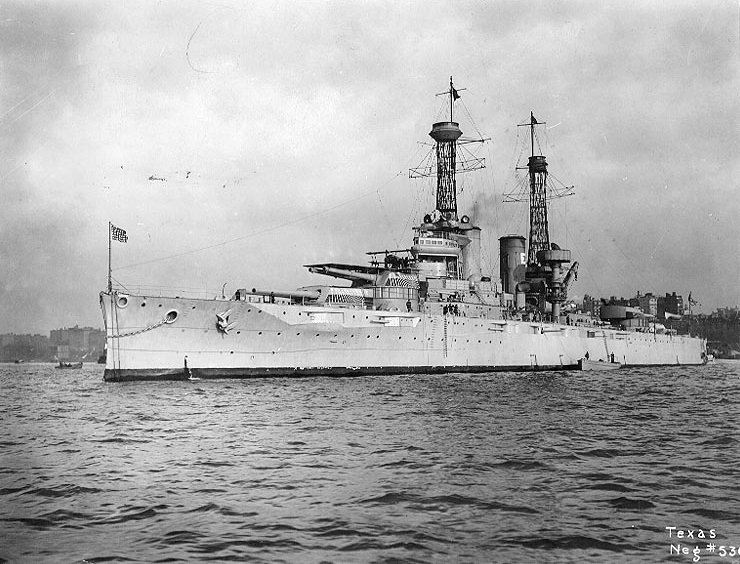
Texas

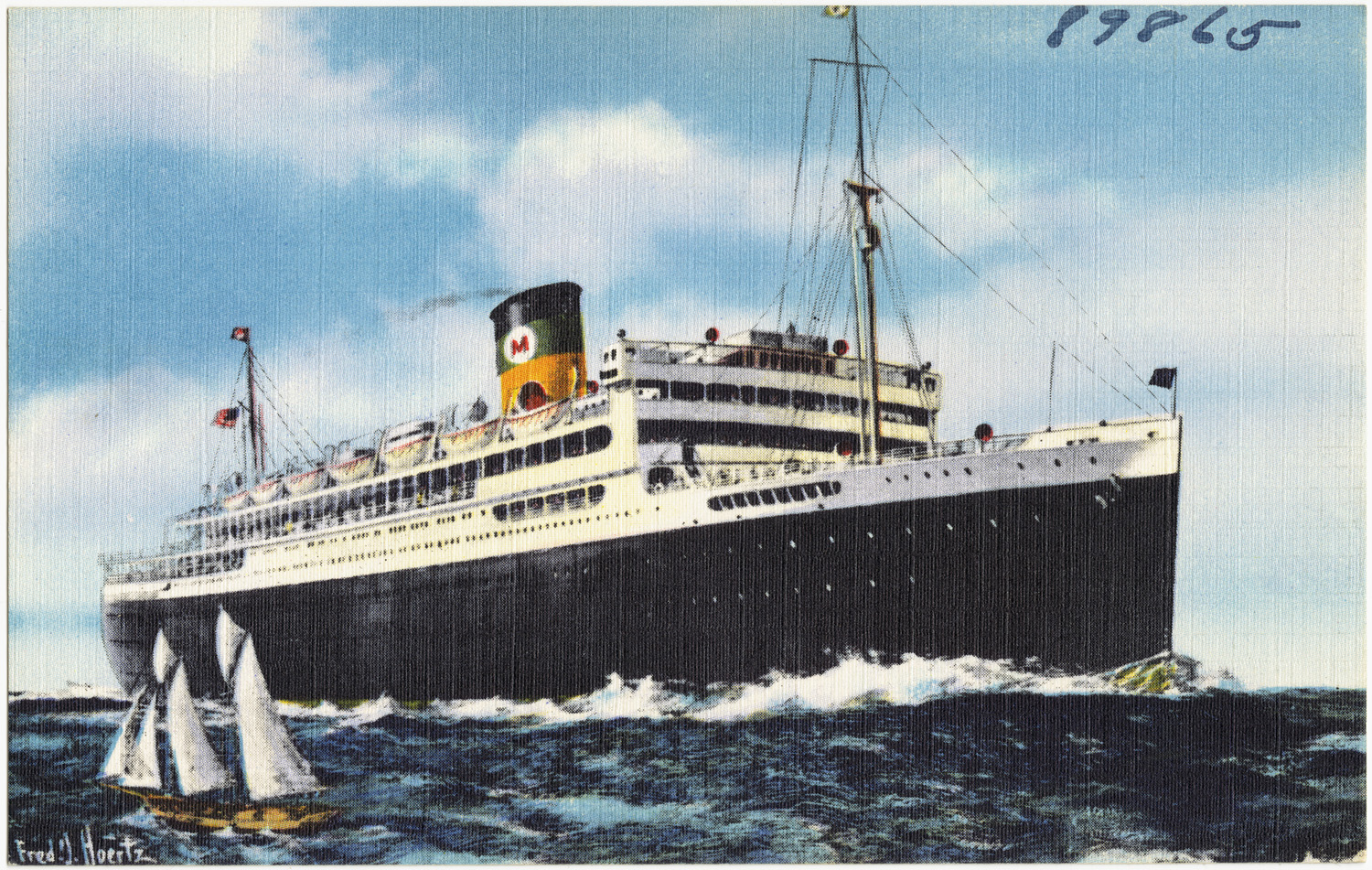
California

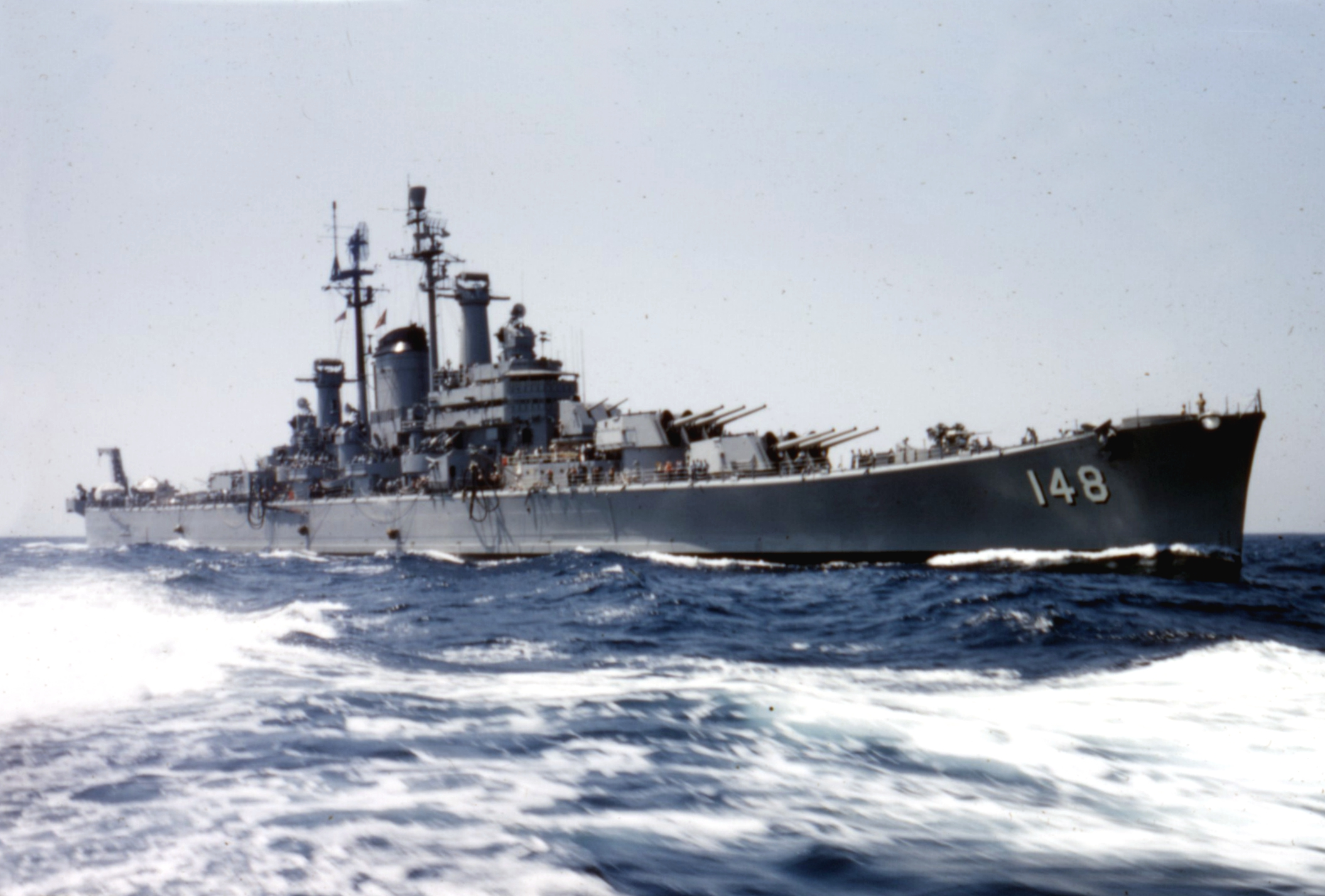
Newport News

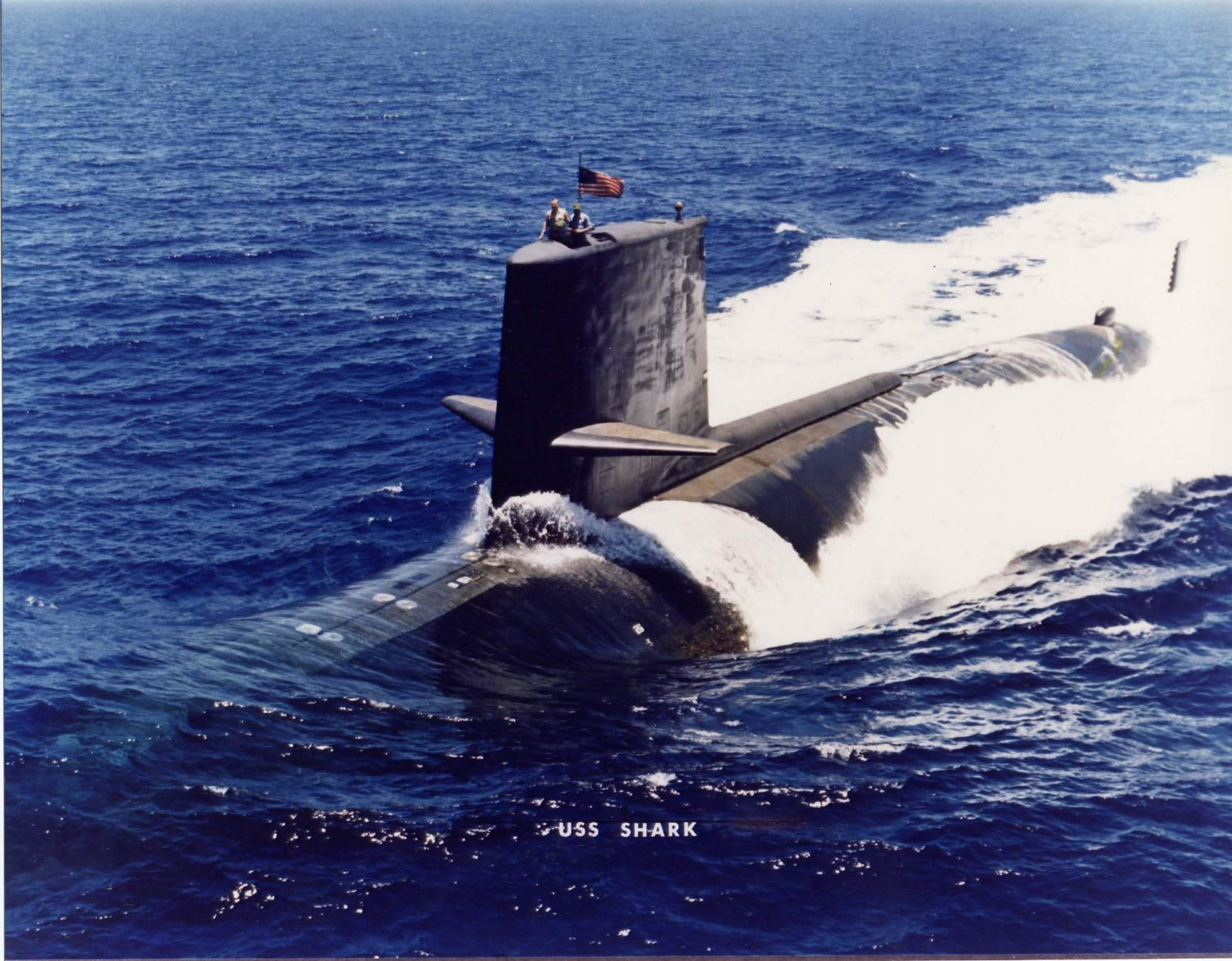
Shark

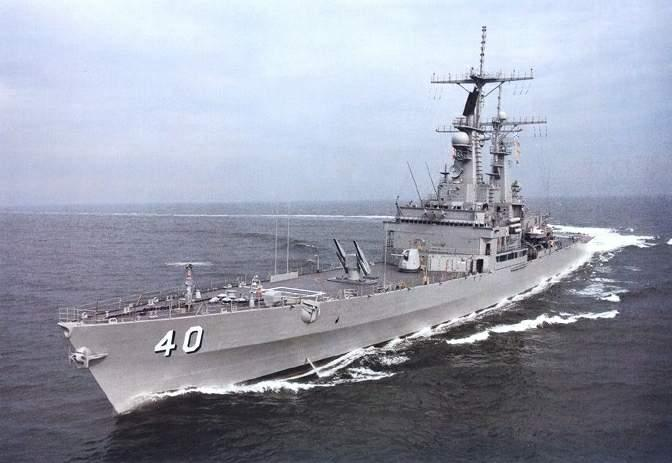
Mississippi

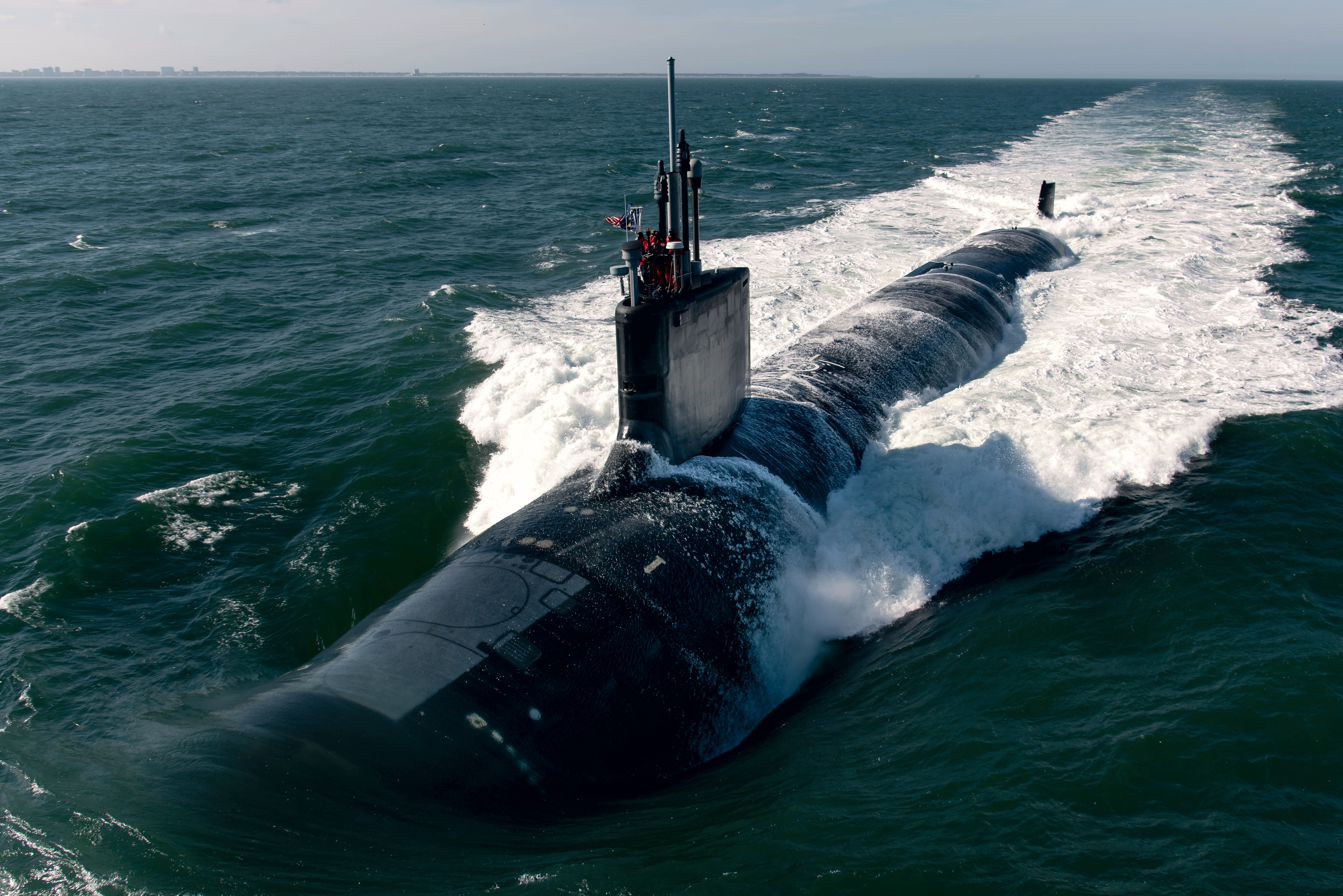
Montana

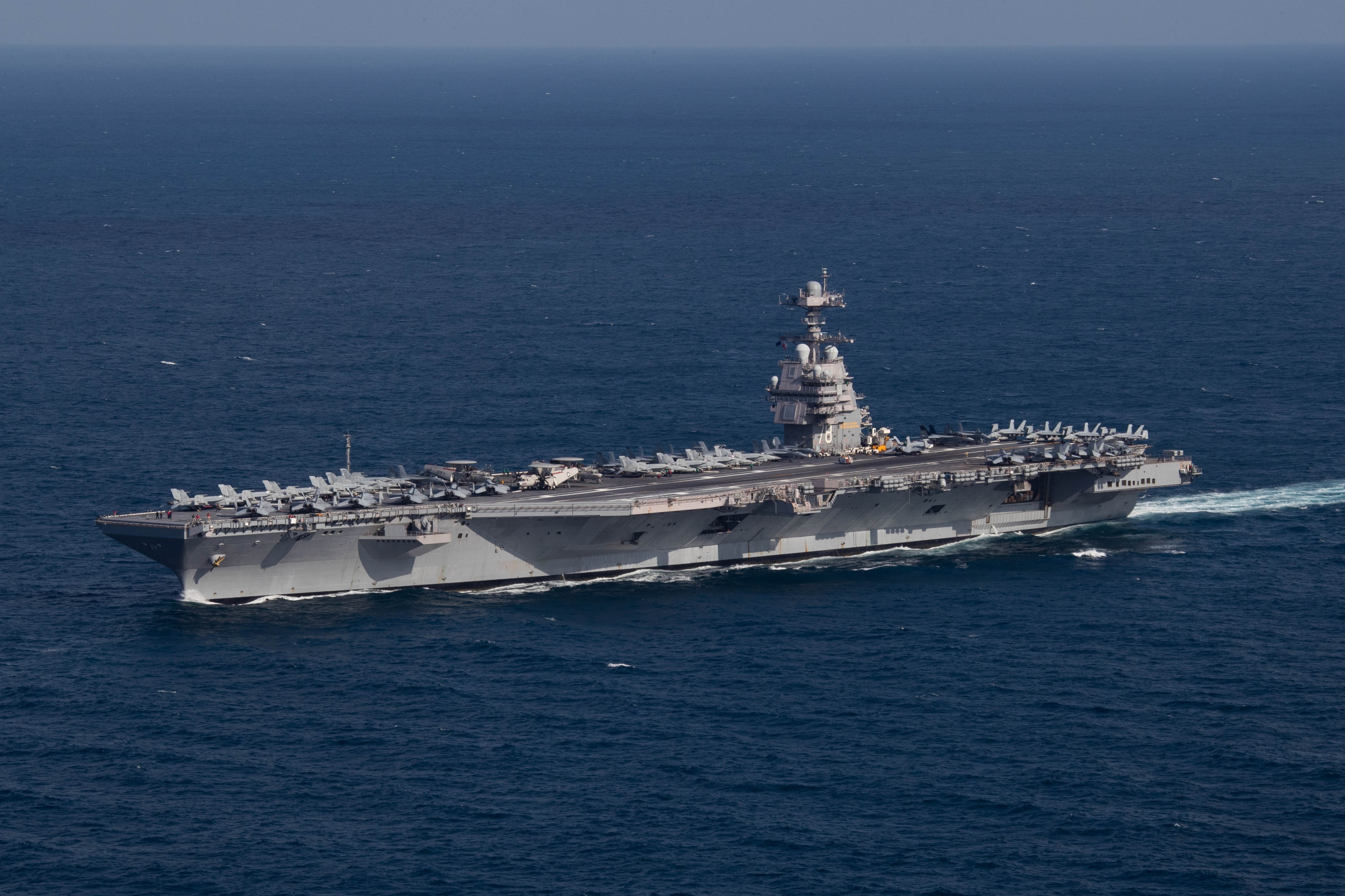
Gerald R. Ford

Launch Date	Yard No.	Ship	Class and type	Operator	Notes	Ref
1891		Dorothy			Shipyard's first vessel, delivered in 1891, on display in yard.	
March 24, 1898		Kearsarge	Kearsarge-class battleship	United States Navy		
March 24, 1898		Kentucky	Kearsarge-class battleship	United States Navy		
October 4, 1898		Illinois	Illinois-class battleship	United States Navy		
November 10, 1900		Arkansas	Arkansas-class monitor	United States Navy	One of the last monitors built for the United States Navy	
April 18, 1903		West Virginia	Pennsylvania-class cruiser	United States Navy		
September 12, 1903		Maryland	Pennsylvania-class cruiser	United States Navy		
April 6, 1904		Virginia	Virginia-class battleship	United States Navy		
April 3, 1905		Binghampton	ferryboat	New York Harbor	Last surviving steam ferry built to serve New York Harbor when dismantled in 2017.	
October 6, 1906		North Carolina	Tennessee-class cruiser	United States Navy		
December 15, 1906		Montana	Tennessee-class cruiser	United States Navy		
March 9, 1907		Minnesota	Connecticut-class battleship	United States Navy		
1908		Georgia	Oil tanker	M.V. Dutch Tanker & Oil Company		
February 6, 1909		Delaware	Delaware-class battleship	United States Navy		
1910		J. A. Chanslor	Oil tanker	Associated Oil Company		
May 18, 1912		Texas	New York-class battleship	United States Navy	Only surviving dreadnought battleship	
September 14, 1912		Proteus	Proteus-class collier	United States Navy		
April 26, 1913		Nereus	Proteus-class collier	United States Navy		
August 22, 1914	176	Medina	Cargo ship	Mallory Steamship Company	Oldest passenger vessel at time of retirement in 2009.	
March 16, 1915		Pennsylvania	Pennsylvania-class battleship	United States Navy		
January 25, 1917		Mississippi	New Mexico-class battleship	United States Navy		
March 30, 1918		Lamberton	Wickes-class destroyer	United States Navy		
April 5, 1918		Montgomery	Wickes-class destroyer	United States Navy		
April 5, 1918		Radford	Wickes-class destroyer	United States Navy		
May 11, 1918		Breese	Wickes-class destroyer	United States Navy		
November 29, 1918		Gamble	Wickes-class destroyer	United States Navy		
February 15, 1919		Ramsay	Wickes-class destroyer	United States Navy		
February 14, 1920		Abel P. Upshur	Clemson-class destroyer	United States Navy		
March 20, 1920		Maryland	Colorado-class battleship	United States Navy		
November 19, 1920		West Virginia	Colorado-class battleship	United States Navy		
October 1, 1927	315	California	Ocean liner	Panama Pacific Line	Turbo-electric	
1928		Virginia	Ocean liner	Panama Pacific Line		
October 10, 1928	328	Pennsylvania	Ocean liner	Panama Pacific Line		
September 7, 1929		Houston	Northampton-class cruiser	United States Navy		
February 1, 1930		Augusta	Northampton-class cruiser	United States Navy		
December 9, 1930	339	President Hoover	Ocean liner	Dollar Steamship Lines		
February 21, 1931	340	President Coolidge	Ocean liner	Dollar Steamship Lines		
August 15, 1931		Peten	Cargo liner	United Fruit Company		
1931		Talamanca	Cargo liner	United Fruit Company		
1932		Chiriqui	Cargo liner	United Fruit Company		
February 25, 1933		Ranger	Ranger-class aircraft carrier	United States Navy	First purpose-built aircraft carrier of the United States Navy	
April 4, 1936		Yorktown	Yorktown-class aircraft carrier	United States Navy		
October 3, 1936		Enterprise	Yorktown-class aircraft carrier	United States Navy		
December 3, 1936		Boise	Brooklyn-class cruiser	United States Navy		
December 8, 1938		Mustin	Sims-class destroyer	United States Navy		
December 8, 1938		Russell	Sims-class destroyer	United States Navy		
August 31, 1939		America	Ocean liner	United States Lines		
December 14, 1940		Hornet	Yorktown-class aircraft carrier	United States Navy		
November 21, 1941		Indiana	South Dakota-class battleship	United States Navy		
July 31, 1942		Essex	Essex-class aircraft carrier	United States Navy		
April 15, 1943		Yorktown	Essex-class aircraft carrier	United States Navy		
April 26, 1943		Intrepid	Essex-class aircraft carrier	United States Navy		
August 30, 1943		Hornet	Essex-class aircraft carrier	United States Navy	Preserved as the USS Hornet Museum in Alameda, California.	
October 14, 1943		Franklin	Essex-class aircraft carrier	United States Navy		
February 7, 1944		Ticonderoga	Essex-class aircraft carrier	United States Navy		
June 28, 1944		Randolph	Essex-class aircraft carrier	United States Navy		
December 14, 1944		Boxer	Essex-class aircraft carrier	United States Navy		
March 20, 1945		Midway	Midway-class aircraft carrier	United States Navy		
August 23, 1945		Leyte	Essex-class aircraft carrier	United States Navy		
April 2, 1946		Coral Sea	Midway-class aircraft carrier	United States Navy		
March 6, 1948		Newport News	Des Moines-class heavy cruiser	United States Navy		
June 23, 1951		United States	Ocean liner	United States Lines	Holder of the Blue Riband.	
December 11, 1954		Forrestal	Forrestal-class aircraft carrier	United States Navy		
September 29, 1956		Ranger	Forrestal-class aircraft carrier	United States Navy		
December 18, 1959		Robert E. Lee	George Washington-class submarine	United States Navy		
March 16, 1960		Shark	Skipjack-class submarine	United States Navy	Yard's first nuclear-powered submarine.	
September 24, 1960		Enterprise	Enterprise-class aircraft carrier	United States Navy	World's first nuclear-powered aircraft carrier.	
September 16, 1961		Empire State VI	Troopship	United States Maritime Administration		
February 1, 1964		America	Kitty Hawk-class aircraft carrier	United States Navy		
May 27, 1967		John F. Kennedy	John F. Kennedy-class aircraft carrier	United States Navy		
May 13, 1972		Nimitz	Nimitz-class aircraft carrier	United States Navy	Nuclear-powered.	
December 14, 1974		Virginia	Virginia-class cruiser	United States Navy	Nuclear-powered.	
August 9, 1975		Texas	Virginia-class cruiser	United States Navy	Nuclear-powered.	
October 11, 1975		Dwight D. Eisenhower	Nimitz-class aircraft carrier	United States Navy	Nuclear-powered.	
July 31, 1976		Mississippi	Virginia-class cruiser	United States Navy	Nuclear-powered	
October 21, 1978		Arkansas	Virginia-class cruiser	United States Navy	Nuclear-powered	
March 15, 1980		Carl Vinson	Nimitz-class aircraft carrier	United States Navy	Nuclear-powered	
October 27, 1984		Theodore Roosevelt	Nimitz-class aircraft carrier	United States Navy	Nuclear-powered	
February 13, 1988		Abraham Lincoln	Nimitz-class aircraft carrier	United States Navy	Nuclear-powered	
July 21, 1990		George Washington	Nimitz-class aircraft carrier	United States Navy	Nuclear-powered	
November 13, 1993		John C. Stennis	Nimitz-class aircraft carrier	United States Navy	Nuclear-powered	
September 7, 1996		Harry S. Truman	Nimitz-class aircraft carrier	United States Navy	Nuclear-powered	
March 4, 2001		Ronald Reagan	Nimitz-class aircraft carrier	United States Navy	Nuclear-powered	
October 9, 2006		George H.W. Bush	Nimitz-class aircraft carrier	United States Navy	Nuclear-powered	
October 11, 2013		Gerald R. Ford	Ford-class aircraft carrier	United States Navy	Nuclear-powered	
October 29, 2019		John F. Kennedy	Ford-class aircraft carrier	United States Navy	Nuclear-powered	

Other ships built at the Newport News yard include

- Gerald R. Ford-class nuclear-powered aircraft carriers:
  - USS Enterprise (CVN-80), under construction
  - USS Doris Miller (CVN-81), under construction
- Liberty ship transports for the Allies during World War II
- Los Angeles-class nuclear-powered submarines
- Virginia-class nuclear-powered submarines

=== Gallery ===
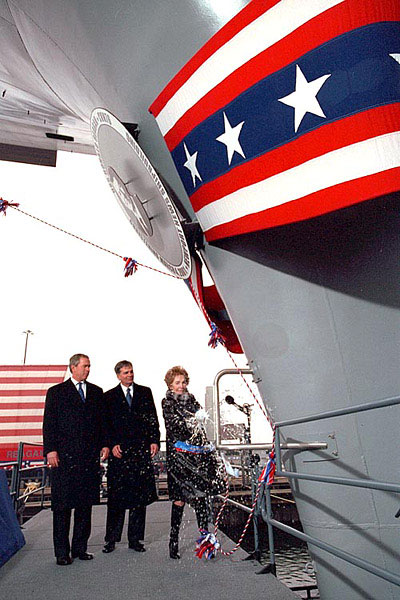
Ronald Reagan christening

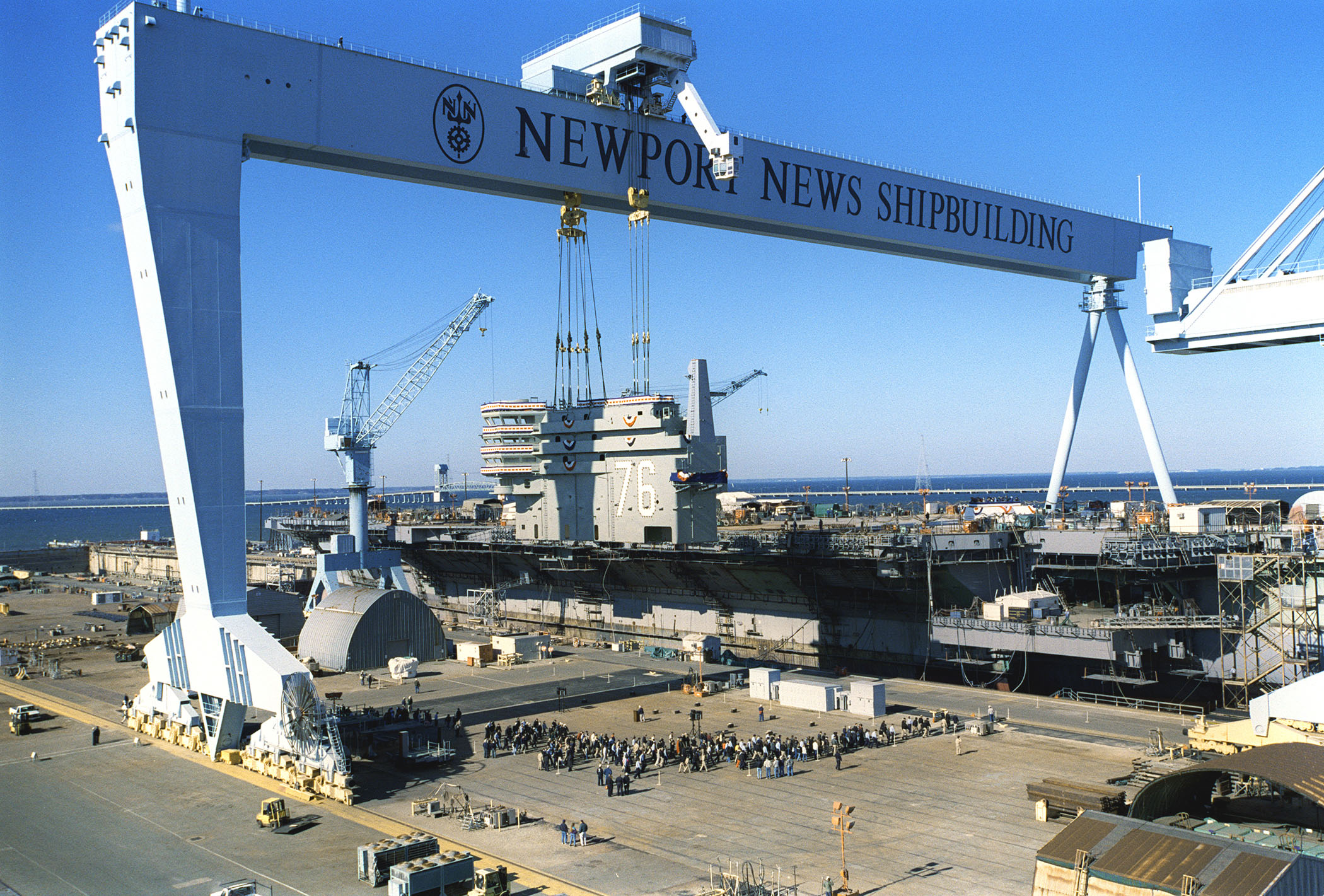
The 1,050-metric-ton capacity gantry crane at the north end of the yard, one of the largest in the Western Hemisphere.

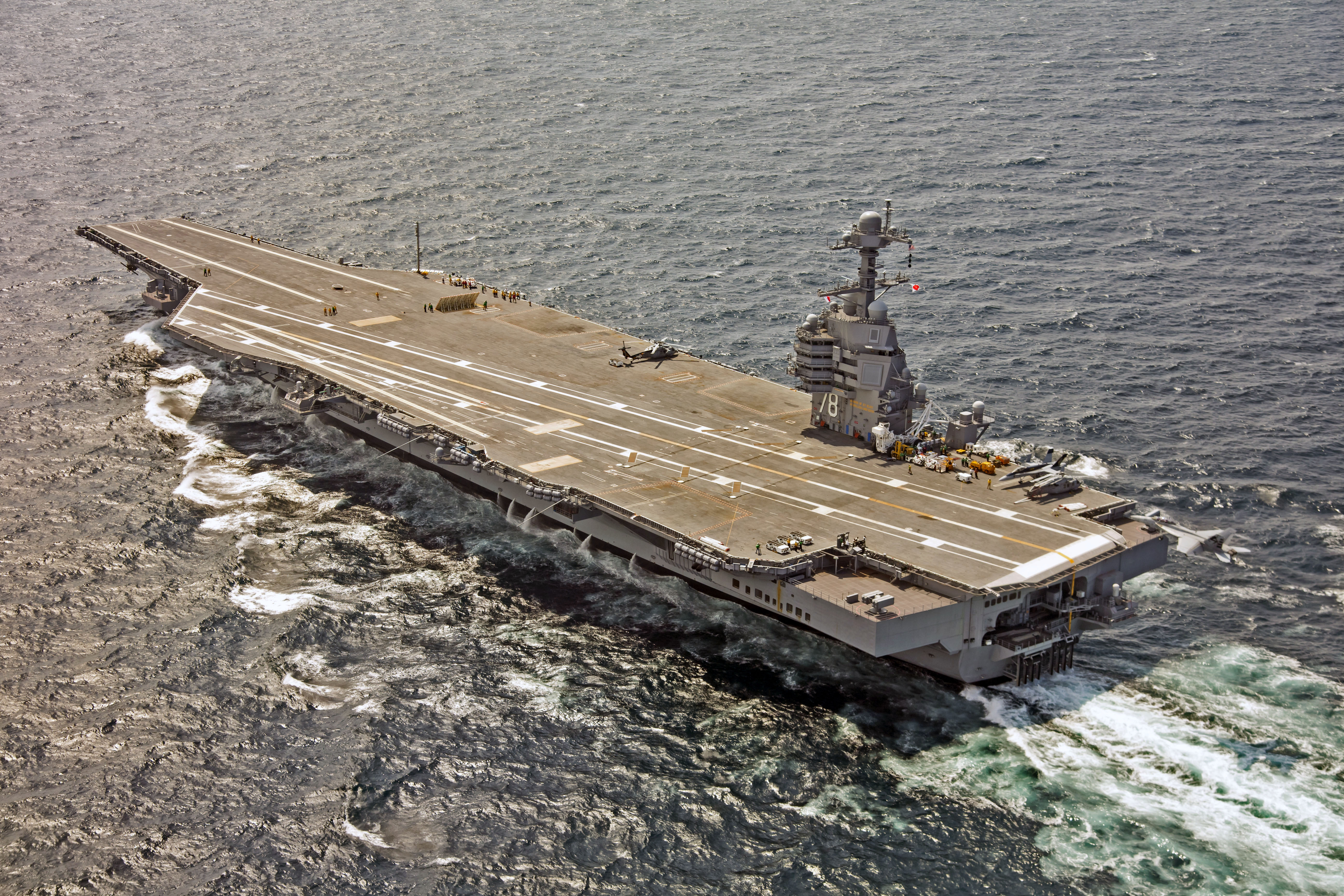
Gerald R. Ford-class aircraft carrier

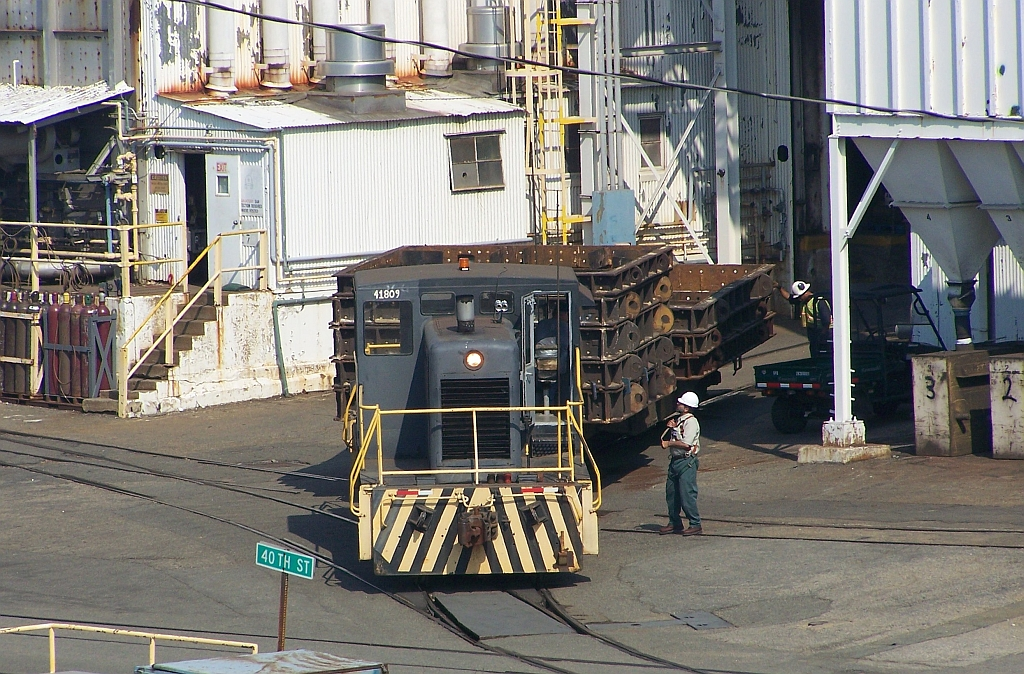
Newport News Shipbuilding Foundry & Switch Engine

== Ships rebuilt ==
- SS Jacona, the first seagoing electric power plant for emergencies
- Sea Witch, wrecked ship that was salvaged and her still-operational stern and machinery spaces rebuilt and used in the construction of a new chemical tanker, the Chemical Discoverer, later renamed Chemical Pioneer

== World War II Shipbuilding Facilities ==
Shipway	Width	Length	Type	Date
2	76 feet (23 m)	628 feet (191 m)	Inclined Slipway	
3	76 feet (23 m)	628 feet (191 m)	Inclined Slipway	
4	76 feet (23 m)	628 feet (191 m)	Inclined Slipway	
5	76 feet (23 m)	628 feet (191 m)	Inclined Slipway	
6	96 feet (29 m)	628 feet (191 m)	Inclined Slipway	
7	76 feet (23 m)	628 feet (191 m)	Inclined Slipway	
8	111 feet (34 m)	1,000 feet (300 m)	Semi-submerged Inclined Slipway	1919
9	111 feet (34 m)	1,000 feet (300 m)	Semi-submerged Inclined Slipway	1919
10	128 feet (39 m)	960 feet (290 m)	Graving Dock	1941
11	140 feet (43 m)	1,100 feet (340 m)	Graving Dock	1941
