= SS Pennsylvania =

SS Pennsylvania may refer to any one of a number of ships.

- SS Pennsylvania (1872), a 3,104-ton ship of the American Line
- SS Pennsylvania (1896), a 12,891-ton ship of the Hamburg-America Line built by Harland and Wolff
- SS Pennsylvania (1929), a 20,526-ton ship built for the Panama Pacific Line; later renamed Argentina.

== See also ==
- State of Pennsylvania (steamboat)
- USS Pennsylvania
- SS Pennsylvania Sun
- SS Pennsylvanian
