= SS California (1927) =

1927 ocean liner

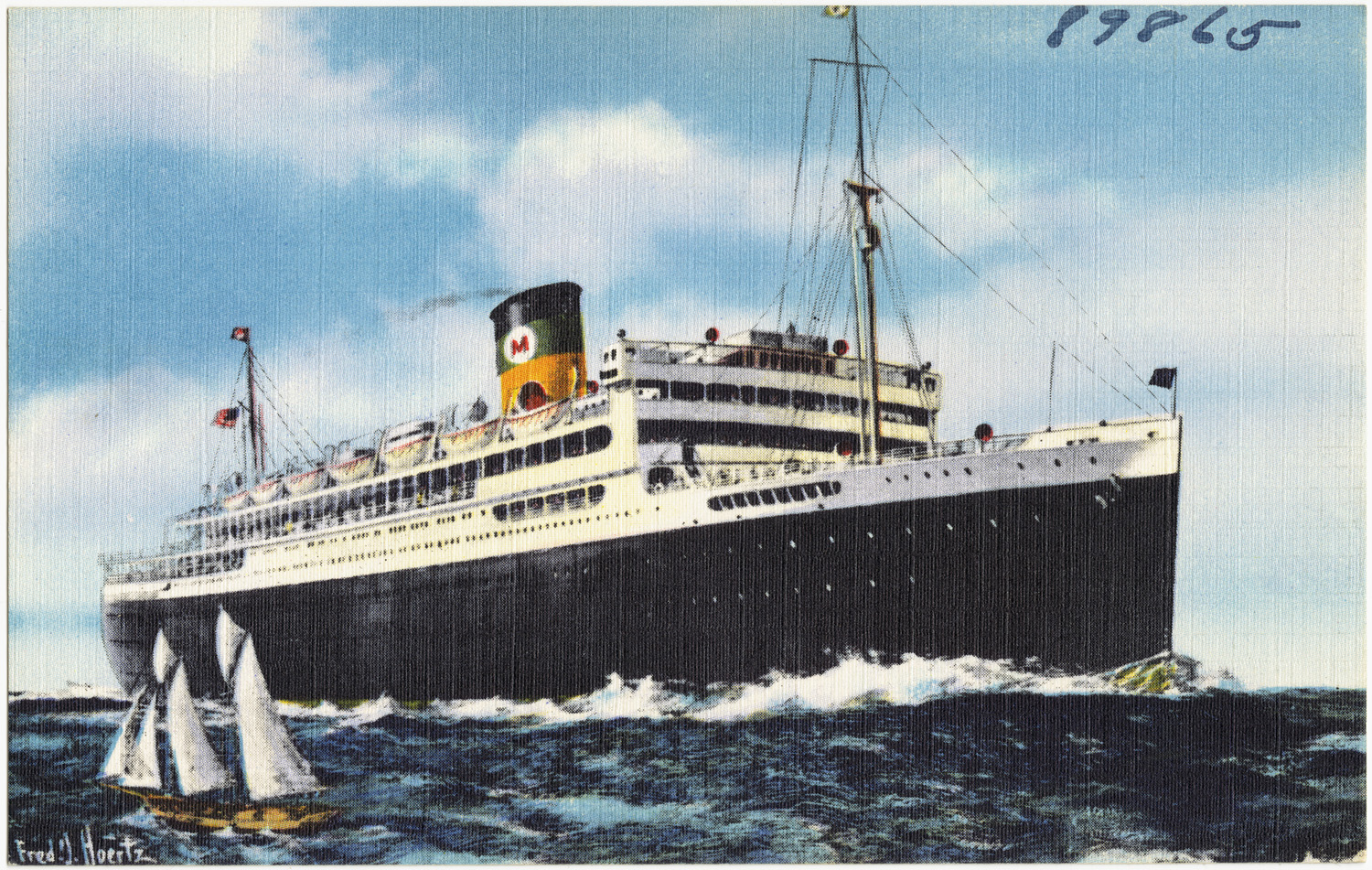
- Artist's impression of the ship as SS Uruguay, 1938–41 or 1948–54

History

United States
- Name: SS California (1928–38); SS Uruguay (1938–1964)
- Namesake: California; Uruguay
- Owner: American Line Steamship Corp (1928–38); US Maritime Commission (1938–64)
- Operator: Panama Pacific Line (1928–38); American Republics Line (1938–42); War Shipping Administration agents (1942–46); Moore-McCormack Lines, Inc. (1947–54)
- Port of registry: New York
- Route: New York – Havana – Panama Canal – Los Angeles – San Francisco (1928–37); New York – Barbados (outbound)/Trinidad (return) – Rio de Janeiro – Santos – Montevideo – Buenos Aires (1939–41, 1948–54)
- Builder: Newport News Shipbuilding
- Yard number: 315
- Laid down: 20 March 1926
- Launched: 1 October 1927
- Sponsored by: Mrs. Roland Palmedo
- Completed: January 1928
- Maiden voyage: 28 January 1928
- In service: 1928–1954
- Out of service: 29 March 1954
- Renamed: SS Uruguay in 1938
- Refit: 1938, 1942, 1947
- Home port: New York
- Identification: official number 227115; Code letters MGRH (until 1933); Call sign WMCM (from 1934)
- Fate: Scrapped 1964

General characteristics
- Type: ocean liner (1928–38; 1946–54); troopship (1942–46)
- Tonnage: as California: 17,833 GRT, 9,511 NRT; as Uruguay: 20,183 GRT, 11,743 NRT
- Displacement: as Uruguay: 32,450 tons
- Length: 574.4 ft (175.1 m) p/p
- Beam: 80.3 ft (24.5 m)
- Depth: 20.5 ft (6.2 m)
- Installed power: 2,833 NHP 17,000 shp
- Propulsion: turbo-electric transmission, twin screw
- Speed: 18 knots (33 km/h; 21 mph); record 19.95 knots (36.95 km/h) (1951)
- Range: 3,300 nautical miles (6,100 km)
- Capacity: 4,473 troops; 212,325 cubic feet (6,012 m^{3}) cargo
- Sensors & processing systems: direction finding equipment; gyrocompass (from 1934)
- Notes: sister ships: SS Pennsylvania, SS Virginia

SS California was the World's first major ocean liner built with turbo-electric propulsion. When launched in 1927 she was also the largest merchant ship yet built in the US, although she was a modest size compared with the biggest European liners of her era.

In 1938 California was renamed SS Uruguay. From 1942 to 1946 she was operated through agents by the War Shipping Administration as the troopship Uruguay. She was returned to civilian service as SS Uruguay in 1948, laid up in 1954 and scrapped in 1964.

== Building ==
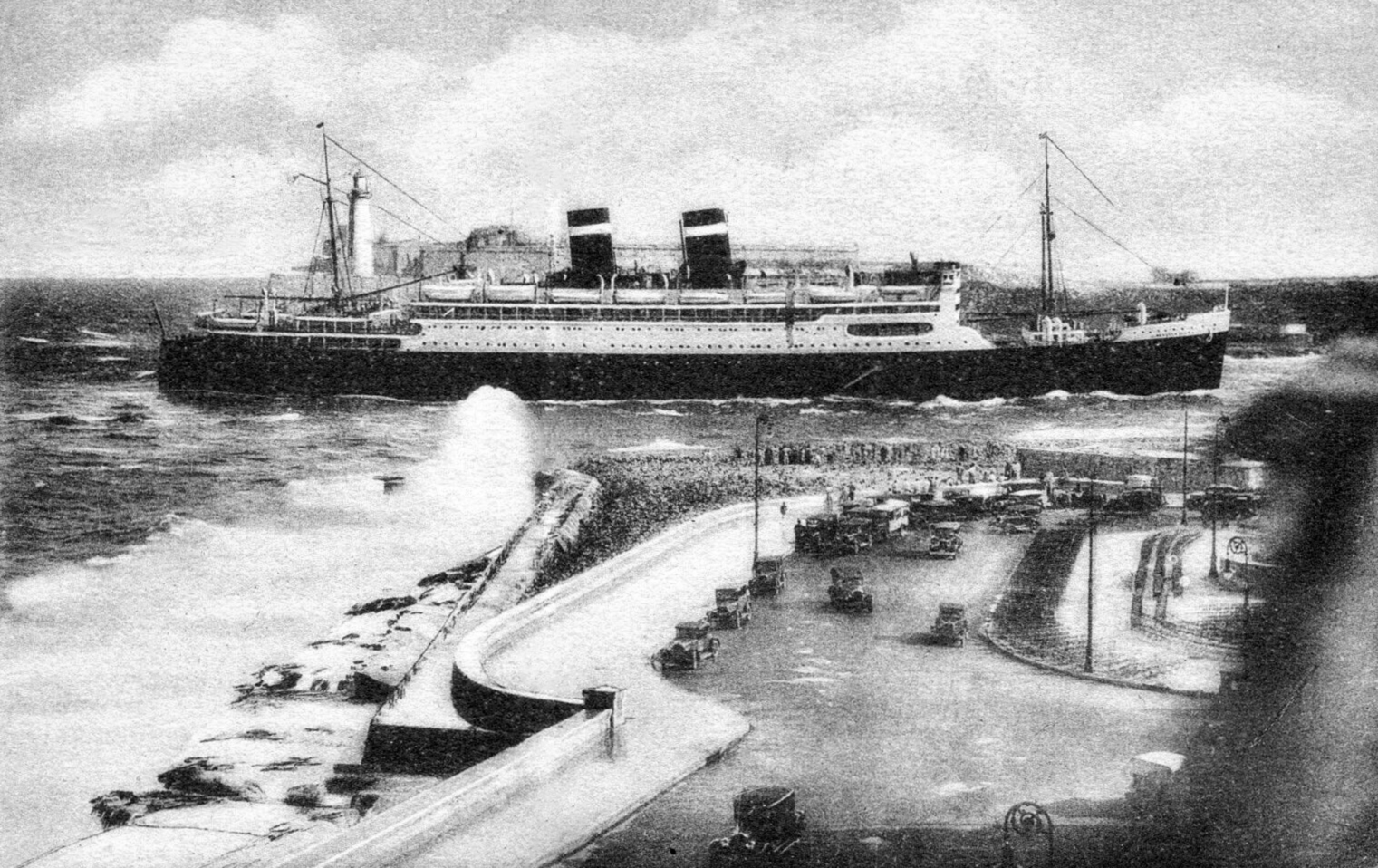
SS California entering Havana Harbor, Cuba in 1934.

California was the first of three sister ships built by the Newport News Shipbuilding and Drydock Company of Newport News, Virginia for the Panama Pacific Lines, a subsidiary of American Line Steamship Corporation which was a part of J. P. Morgan's International Mercantile Marine Company. California was the largest American built passenger liner at the time. The ship's keel was laid 20 March 1926 as hull number 325, launched on 1 October 1927 and delivered to American Line on 13 January 1928. Mrs. Roland Palmedo, wife of the businessman Roland Palmedo and daughter of the president of International Mercantile Marine, sponsored the launch. The ship left New York for the Pacific Coast on 28 January 1928 to begin the regular route between the coasts by way of the Panama Canal. California's sister SS Virginia was launched in 1928 and the third of the trio, Pennsylvania, was launched in 1929. All three sisters entered the fleet Panama Pacific Lines.

California was a steamship, with oil-fired furnaces heating her boilers to power two steam turbo generators that ran at a constant 2,800 RPM. These supplied current to her 18-foot (5 m)-high electric propulsion motors, which had a combined rating of 2,833 NHP or 17,000 shp. The turbo-generators and propulsion motors were built by General Electric, which was the world pioneer of turbo-electric propulsion, having supplied the turbo-generators and electric motors for USS New Mexico, the World's first turbo-electric ship, a decade earlier.

California was equipped with submarine signalling apparatus and wireless direction finding equipment, and from about 1934 she was equipped with a gyrocompass.

California's first class accommodation was air conditioned and some first class cabins had en suite bathrooms.

With Panama Pacific Lines, California's two funnels would have been red with a blue top, with a white band dividing the blue from the red.

== SS California ==
Panama Pacific Line, part of the American Line Steamship Corp, operated California and her sisters between New York and San Francisco via the Panama Canal until 1938. California, Virginia and Pennsylvania were subsidised to carry mail on this route for the United States Postal Service.

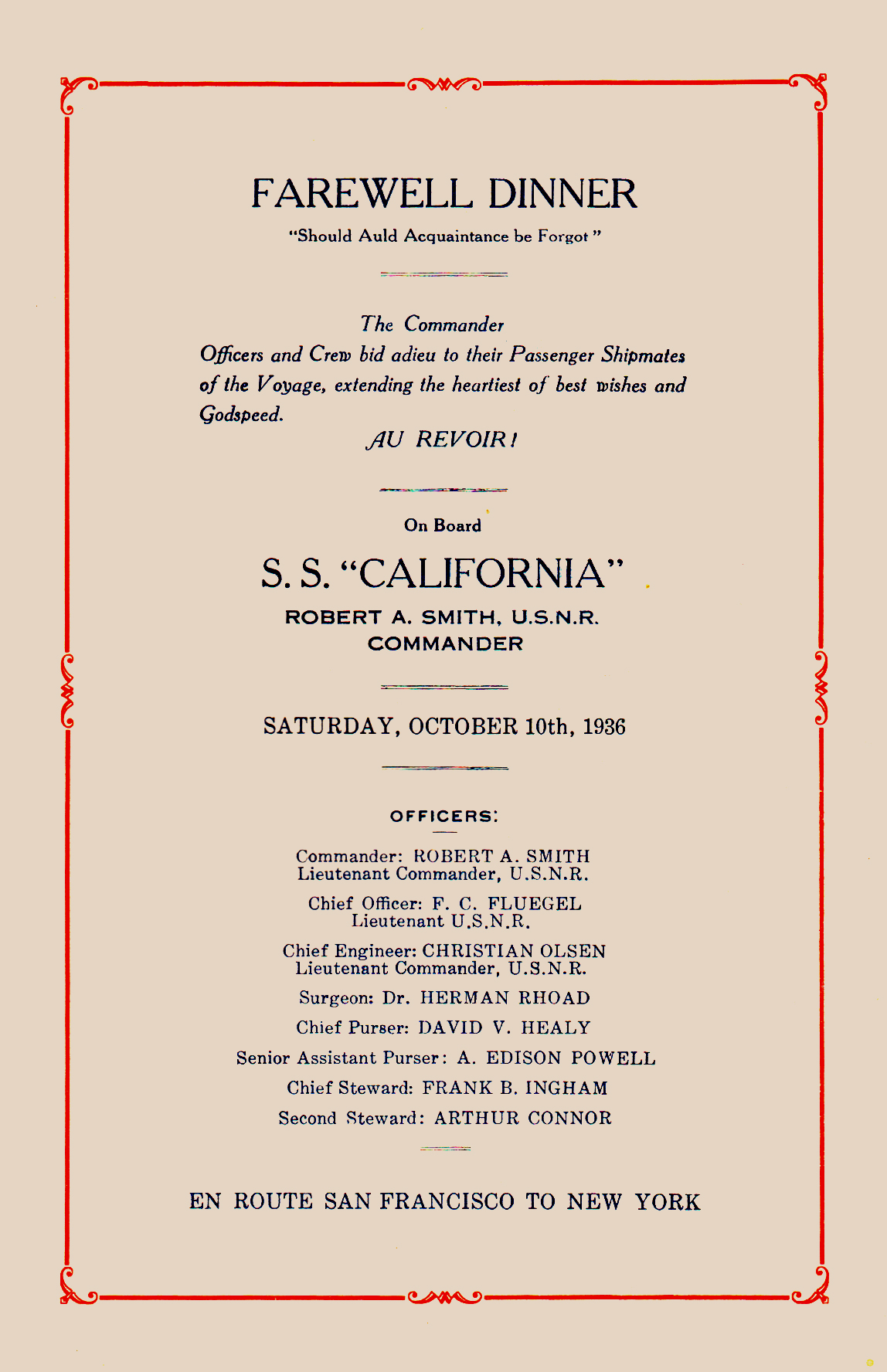
San Francisco to New York "Farewell Dinner" on board SS California Oct 10, 1936

In March 1936 an unofficial strike aboard California in port at San Pedro, Los Angeles, held without the sanction of the International Seamen's Union, led to the foundation of the National Maritime Union. The dispute was about wage rates and overtime payments. The strike lasted only three days but Panama Pacific never fully recovered from it.

In June 1937 the United States Congress withdrew all maritime mail subsidies, which by then included a total of $450,000 per year for Panama Pacific's three liners. At the beginning of March 1938 the Panama Canal tolls were revised, increasing Panama Pacific's costs by $37,000 per year. As a result of these cost increases and continuing labor difficulties Panama Pacific discontinued its New York – California service and took all three liners out of service. California was the last to leave service, joining Pennsylvania and Virginia in New York at the beginning of May 1938.

== SS Uruguay ==
On 10 June 1938 the United States Maritime Commission (MC) purchased the ship, made repairs and placed it under an operating agreement with Moore McCormack Line 13 January 1939. The MC operating agreement continued until 30 January 1942 when the operation of commercial type ships was turned over to the War Shipping Administration which then continued the operating agreement with Moore McCormack until 9 July 1946.

In 1938 Newport News Shipbuilding drydocked and extensively refurbished California as hull 377. New propellers were fitted. All three sisters were fireproofed to comply with Federal safety regulations, which had been revised as a result of the fire in 1934 that destroyed the liner Morro Castle. California's state rooms were improved, her air conditioning was extended to her tourist class accommodation, a new swimming pool was installed, and her after deck was rebuilt with the addition of a veranda café.

California had been built with two funnels but during the refit this was reduced to one. The refit increased California's tonnage by about 2,000 tons.

On 4 October 1938 Moore-McCormack Lines, Inc., contracted to operate California, Virginia, Pennsylvania and 10 cargo ships between the US and South America as part of President Franklin D. Roosevelt's Good Neighbor policy. Moore-McCormack renamed the three passenger liners Argentina, Brazil and Uruguay, and assigned them to the fleet of its American Republics Lines subsidiary. On 17 January Uruguay became the first of the three sisters to depart from New York on Moore-McCormack's service to and from Buenos Aires via the Caribbean, Brazil and Montevideo.

With Moore-McCormack Lines California's funnel would have been buff with a black top. A broad green band divided the buff from the black. On each side of the funnel the green band bore a red capital M within a white disk.

== Troop ship ==
When the USA entered the Second World War, Uruguay the War Shipping Administration (WSA) took over all ocean transport operations and had the ship converted into a troop ship. The work was carried out from 2 January 1942 to 1 March 1942, and included the installation of a hospital. The ship, a large and fast vessel capable of independent voyages without escort, was operated by WSA agents and allocated in support of Army troop transport requirements with a passenger capacity of 4,473. (Note: The previous reference, Troopships of World War II, has a detailed list of voyages with dates, departure and destination points.)

On 3 March 1942 Uruguay sailed from Brooklyn, New York carrying US troops. She sailed via the Panama Canal and Bora Bora, reaching Auckland, New Zealand on 9 April. She then sailed Melbourne, Australia and back to New Zealand. She left Wellington Harbour on 28 April carrying Royal New Zealand Air Force cadets, and arrived in San Francisco, California on 14 May. On 26 May Uruguay sailed from San Francisco carrying US troops, reaching Auckland on 12 June.

On 6 August 1942 Uruguay left Brooklyn carrying the USAAF 301st Bombardment Group. She sailed via Halifax, Nova Scotia and Gourock, Scotland to Swansea, Wales, arriving on 25 August. In October and November 1942 Uruguay carried troops via Gibraltar to Oran, French Algeria in Operation Torch, the invasion of Vichy French North Africa. On 12 December 1942 she sailed from New York again with troops to Casablanca, French Morocco.

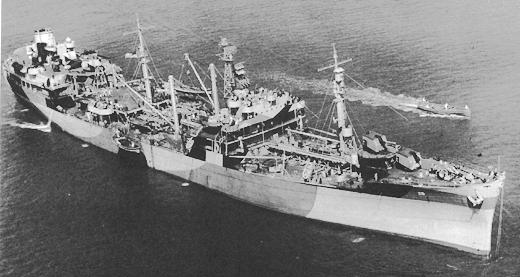
Oil tanker USS Salamonie, which accidentally rammed Uruguay on 12 February 1943

On 8 February 1943 Uruguay sailed from New York with 5,000 troops bound for the UK. On 12 February 1943 in the North Atlantic the oil tanker USS Salamonie suffered a steering fault and accidentally rammed Uruguay amidships. The tanker's bow made a 70-foot (21 m) hole in Uruguay's hull and penetrated her hospital, killing 13 soldiers and injuring 50. One injured soldier, Sergeant Cecil Davis, landed on the tanker's deck, where he was not discovered until Salamonie had changed course to Bermuda for repairs. Uruguay's crew contained the damage by building a temporary bulkhead and three days later she reached harbor, also in Bermuda. President Franklin D. Roosevelt decorated Uruguay's Master, Captain Albert Spaulding, with the Merchant Marine Distinguished Service Medal for saving many lives, his ship and her cargo.

Uruguay was out of service for three months for repairs. On 15 May 1943 she left New York, heading via the Panama Canal to Brisbane, Australia. On 3 August she sailed from Los Angeles for Fremantle, Australia and Bombay, India. She crossed the Equator on 9 August, the International Date Line on 17 August and reached Bombay on 10 September. On 18 November Uruguay left Los Angeles. She called at Hobart, Tasmania on 6 December and reached Bombay on 26 December.

Uruguay spent most of 1944 and the first half of 1945 crossing and re-crossing the North Atlantic. On 5 February she left New York for Liverpool, England. On 7 April she left Boston for Liverpool and the Firth of Clyde. On 12 May she left New York for the Clyde and Liverpool. On 3 July she left Boston for Liverpool. On 11 August she left New York for the Clyde. On 20 September she left New York for the River Mersey. On 30 October she left New York for an unrecorded destination in the United Kingdom.

In November and December 1944 Uruguay took all the cadets of the West Point Military Academy from New York to Baltimore and back for the annual Army–Navy football game on 2 December. Three destroyers escorted Uruguay and the convoy kept close to shore because of the threat of German U-boats. The inshore voyage was rough and all the cadets were seasick, but their team beat the Navy 23–7.

On 9 December Uruguay left New York for Southampton, England. On 10 January 1945 she left Boston for the Solent, England and Le Havre, France. On 27 February she left New York for Le Havre and Southampton. On 8 April she left New York for Southampton.

On 19 May 1945 Uruguay left New York for Livorno, Italy. From Livorno she sailed via Gibraltar and the Panama Canal to Manila, Leyte, Honolulu and then San Francisco. On 22 September she left San Francisco and returned to Manila. On 22 November she left San Pedro for Yokohama.

On 17 January 1946 Uruguay left San Francisco for Manila and Yokohama. On 15 February 1946 she left Yokohama carrying European diplomats and dignitaries whom Japan had detained during the Second World War, and wounded US soldiers. She sailed via the Panama Canal and took her European evacuees to Southampton.

On 20 April 1946 Uruguay left New York for Le Havre. On 15 May 1946 she left New York for Southampton and Le Havre.

In US Army service Uruguay carried a total of more than 200,000 US troops.

== Post-war ==
On 25 June 1946 Uruguay reverted to the Maritime Commission and Federal Shipbuilding and Drydock Company of Kearny, New Jersey was awarded a $4,437,000 contract to convert her back into an ocean liner. On 23 June 1947 she entered Todd Shipyards' No. 1 Graving Dock. Her hull was sand-blasted to bare metal, 87 of her steel plates and 85,000 rivets were replaced before she was repainted. Work was delayed by a shipyard workers' strike but were completed on 6 September. Uruguay was extensively modernised and her interior was completely restyled in a restrained style designed by William F Schorn, who at the same time designed the new interior of her sister ship SS Brazil.

On 23 January 1948 Uruguay left Todd Shipyards for an 18-hour sea trial, and the next day the Maritime Commission restored her to Moore-McCormack Lines. Captain Spaulding resumed command and on 30 January Uruguay started a nine-day Caribbean cruise to Nassau and Havana.

On 10 February 1948 Uruguay was given the US Navy Reserve pennant and her library was dedicated in memory of Thomas K Locke, a Moore-McCormack employee who died on active service as an infantry captain in the Second World War. On 12 February Uruguay sailed from New York on the Buenos Aires run for the first time since 1941.

On 17 June 1951 Albert Spaulding retired, having spent the last decade of his career in command of Uruguay. Captain Howard F Lane succeeded him. On her first voyage under Lane's command, Uruguay achieved her fastest time from Rio de Janeiro to Trinidad, covering the distance in six days, 14 hours and 42 minutes and averaging 19.95 knots (36.95 km/h).

On 8 August 1952 about 230 nautical miles (430 km) out of New York Uruguay struck a submerged object that damaged and disabled one of her propellers. This caused excessive vibration, so she diverted to Newport News for the propeller to be repaired.

Moore-McCormack deemed Uruguay to be the least efficient of the three sister ships, so in 1954 the company withdrew her from service. She completed her last South American voyage when she docked in the North River in New York on 29 March 1954. Tugboat crews were on strike at the time so Uruguay docked unaided.

She was transferred to the US Federal Government and was laid up as part of the James River, Reserve Fleet at Fort Eustis, Virginia.

Late in 1963 the United States Department of Commerce offered Uruguay for sale. In 1964 she was sold to the North American Smelting Co of Wilmington, Delaware for scrap.

== Notable passengers ==
In October 1935 the California politician William A. Sutherland died of a heart attack aboard California.

In 1939 Carmen Miranda left Brazil aboard Uruguay to start her career in the USA. She arrived in New York on 18 May.

In 1940 Leopold Stokowski and his All-American Youth Orchestra toured South America, and recorded native Brazilian music aboard Uruguay.

In February 1943 the American football coach Bear Bryant was en route to North Africa aboard Uruguay on the voyage when USS Salamonie accidentally rammed her.

In November and December 1944 Bernie Abrams, Doc Blanchard, Glenn Davis, Alexander Haig and Brent Scowcroft were among the West Point Cadets who sailed from New York to Baltimore and back aboard Uruguay.

In 1948 the golfer Henry Cotton sailed on Uruguay to South America.

In 1950 the novelist Taylor Caldwell sailed on Uruguay.

== Sources ==
- Barra, Allen (2005). The Last Coach: The Life of Paul "Bear" Bryant. New York: W.W. Norton & Company. ISBN 0393059820.
- Draper, John L (December 1930). "The Paddle Wheel to Electric Drive". Popular Mechanics: 898–902.
- Harnack, Edwin P (1938) [1903]. All About Ships & Shipping (7th ed.). London: Faber and Faber.
- Talbot-Booth, EC (1942) [1936]. Ships and the Sea (Seventh ed.). London: Sampson Low, Marston & Co. Ltd.
- Wardlow, Chester (1999). The Technical Services — The Transportation Corps: Responsibilities, Organization, and Operations. United States Army In World War II. Washington, DC: Center Of Military History, United States Army. LCCN 99490905.
