= SS Brazil (1928) =

US turbo-electric ocean liner

- SS Virginia, unknown date

History

United States
- Name: Virginia (1928–38); Brazil (1938–64)
- Namesake: Virginia; Brazil
- Owner: American Line Steamship Corp (1928–38); US Maritime Commission (1938–64)
- Operator: Panama Pacific Line (1928–38); American Republics Line (1938–42); War Shipping Administration agents (1942–46); Moore-McCormack Line (1947–58)
- Port of registry: New York
- Route: New York – Havana – Panama Canal – Los Angeles – San Francisco (1928–37); New York – Barbados (outbound)/Trinidad (return) – Rio de Janeiro – Santos – Montevideo – Buenos Aires (1938–41, 1948–58)
- Builder: Newport News Shipbuilding
- Yard number: 326
- Laid down: 14 November 1927
- Launched: 18 August 1928
- Completed: (Delivered) 28 November 1928
- Maiden voyage: 8 — 24 December 1928; New York — San Francisco
- In service: 28 November 1928
- Out of service: laid up 1958
- Identification: US official number 227983; Code letters MHBN (until 1933); Call sign WSBW (from 1934)
- Fate: Scrapped 1964

General characteristics
- Tonnage: as Virginia: (Note: There are significant differences in the U.S. registry and Lloyd's with regard to GRT. The U.S. registry information is used below unless otherwise noted.); 20,773 GRT, 12,167 net (1930 register); as Brazil: 20,614 GRT, 11,319 net (1939 register); 18,298 GRT, 9,781 NRT (1939 Lloyd's)
- Displacement: 32,830
- Length: 613 ft 3 in (186.9 m) LOA; 586.4 ft (178.7 m) registry
- Beam: 80.3 ft (24.5 m)
- Depth: 20.5 ft (6.2 m)
- Installed power: 2,833 NHP
- Propulsion: turbo-electric transmission, twin screw
- Speed: 18 knots (21 mph; 33 km/h); record 18.96 knots (21.82 mph; 35.11 km/h)
- Capacity: as built: 400 first class & 400 tourist class passengers; after 1938 re-fit: 470 passengers; after 1946–48 re-fit: 359 first class and 160 cabin class; cargo: 450,000 pounds (200 tonnes), with 95,000 pounds (43 tonnes) refrigerated
- Crew: as built: 350; after 1938 re-fit: 380
- Sensors & processing systems: direction finding equipment; gyrocompass (from 1934); fathometer (from 1938)
- Notes: sister ships: California, Pennsylvania

SS Brazil was an American ocean liner. She was completed in 1928 as Virginia, and refitted and renamed Brazil in 1938. From 1942 to 1946 she was the War Shipping Administration operated troopship Brazil. She was laid up in 1958 and scrapped in 1964.

== Building ==
Virginia was the second of three sister ships built by the Newport News Shipbuilding and Drydock Company of Newport News, Virginia for the American Line Steamship Corporation, which at the time was part of J. P. Morgan's International Mercantile Marine Co. She joined California which was launched in 1927 in the fleet of American Lines' Panama Pacific Lines subsidiary. A third sister, Pennsylvania, was launched in 1929.

The ship's keel was laid 14 November 1927 as hull number 326 with launch 18 August 1928 and delivery to the owner on 28 November 1928. Virginia sailed under the line's senior captain, H. A. T. Candy, from New York on 8 December arriving in San Francisco on 24 December 1928.

Virginia was registered with U.S. Official Number 227983, signal MHBN, at 20,773 GRT, 12,167 net tons with a registry length of 586.4 ft (178.7 m), 80.3 ft (24.5 m) beam and depth of 20.5 ft (6.2 m) with a crew of 380. Length overall was 613 ft 3 in (186.9 m), molded depth 52 ft (15.8 m) and depth from keel to upper deck of 100 ft (30.5 m) with 32,830 tons displacement with 8,500 ton freight capacity. The 1938-39 U.S. register under Brazil shows slight change in GRT with signal WSBW and the U.S. Maritime Commission as owner.

As built, Virginia had accommodation for 400 first or cabin class passengers and 400 tourist class passengers. Cabin class rooms were all outside with beds and additional persons could be accommodated in sofa berths and Pullman uppers. Many had en suite bathrooms and private sitting rooms. 52 of her first class cabins were suites for up to seven persons in two bedrooms with each having twin beds and settee and an additional settee in the living room. A private bath and verandah completed the suite. The tourist class accommodations were also all outside with hot and cold running water.

The ship was similar to the preceding California. Besides being slightly longer at 613 ft (186.8 m) vice 601 ft (183.2 m) length overall Virginia had a different boiler arrangement with eight Babcock & Wilcox inter-deck, superheater boilers vice the twelve boilers of California. The ship also had a closed ventilation system on the generator and propulsion system to prevent dust and oil build up on coils and parts.

Two General Electric steam turbo generators each having a rating of 6,600 kilowatts at 4,000 volts supplied two synchronous-induction type motors each directly connected to its shaft. One generator could operate both motors at reduced speed. The ship's propulsion was rated at 2,833 NHP.

Virginia was equipped with submarine signalling apparatus, wireless direction finding equipment and a Sperry gyrocompass.

With Panama Pacific Lines, Virginia's two funnels would have been red with a blue top, with a white band dividing the blue from the red.

== Service history ==
=== As Virginia ===
Panama Pacific Line, part of the American Line Steamship Corp, operated Pennsylvania and her sisters between New York and San Francisco via the Panama Canal until 1938. California, Virginia and Pennsylvania were subsidised to carry mail on this route for the United States Postal Service.

In June 1937 the United States Congress withdrew all maritime mail subsidies, which by then included a total of $450,000 per year for Panama Pacific's three liners. At the beginning of March 1938 the Panama Canal tolls were revised, increasing Panama Pacific's costs by $37,000 per year. As a result of these cost increases and continuing labor difficulties Panama Pacific discontinued its New York – California service and took all three liners out of service.

The film Go-Get-'Em, Haines was filmed aboard the ship in January, 1935, during a seven-day cruise from Los Angeles to Panama.

=== As Brazil ===
On 10 June 1938 the US Maritime Commission purchased Brazil and the two sister ships Uruguay and Argentina. The commission had the ships extensively refurbished and each was fireproofed to comply with Federal safety regulations, which had been revised as a result of the fire in 1934 that destroyed the liner Morro Castle.

Bethlehem Shipbuilding Corporation's 56th St Shipyard in Brooklyn, New York undertook Virginia's refit. She was given new watertight doors electrically controlled from her bridge and was equipped with a fathometer. Her well decks were closed in: the forward one to increase deck space and the after on to create a sheltered tourist class deck, a lido deck, a swimming pool and a first class veranda café. Her 52 staterooms were combined to provide half that number of larger cabins. This revised her passenger capacity to 470. Her air conditioning was extended to the tourist class dining saloon. A modern laundry was installed to give passengers a 12-hour service. Her crew accommodation was completely rearranged.

Virginia was equipped to carry 450,000 pounds (200 tonnes) of cargo, of which 95,000 pounds (43 tonnes) was refrigerated. She had been built with two funnels but during the refit this was reduced to one. The refit increased Virginia's tonnage by about 2,000 tons.

On 6 September 1938 Emmet McCormack, co-founder of Moore-McCormack Lines, declared

The South American trade, in so far as the United States is concerned, has been touched only at its surface. With this ship [i.e. SS Virginia] and her two sister liners in service the United States will be making a new bid for its proper place in the South American field. They are larger than any other American ships now serving South America and will be able, in conjunction with our fleet of freight ships, to provide a speed that is now lacking.

On 3 October 1938 Virginia, now renamed Brazil, successfully made her sea trials. The next day Moore-McCormack contracted to operate California, Virginia, Pennsylvania and 10 cargo ships between the US and South America as part of President Franklin D. Roosevelt's Good Neighbor policy. Moore-McCormack renamed the three passenger liners Argentina, Brazil and Uruguay, and assigned them to the fleet of its American Republics Lines subsidiary.

With Moore-McCormack Lines Brazil's funnel would have been buff with a black top. A broad green band divided the buff from the black. On each side of the funnel the green band bore a red capital M within a white disk.

Moore-McCormack put the three sisters into service between New York and Buenos Aires via the Caribbean, Brazil and Montevideo. Brazil started from New York on her first voyage on the route on 15 November 1938, returning on 31 December with 141 passengers. On 10 February 1939 the Maritime Commission's agreement with the line was for a bareboat charter of the ship. Passenger numbers improved and on 18 September 1939 Brazil docked in New York from South America with 358 passengers.

In April 1940 Brazil made a record run from Buenos Aires to New York in 14 days and 12 hours, achieving speeds of up to 18.96 knots (35.11 km/h). On the trip she carried 273 passengers, of which 195 traveled first class.

On 13 September 1940 Brazil sailed from Buenos Aires to New York with exiled Lithuanian composer Vytautas Bacevicius, aged 35, on the passenger list.

On 28 September 1941 Brazil was leaving Buenos Aires when she accidentally struck a Spanish-owned freighter, the 12,595 gross register tons (GRT) turbine steamship Cabo de Buena Esperanza. No-one was injured and no damage was caused.

==== Wartime civilian voyage ====
On the morning of 6 December 1941 Brazil sailed from New York for South America carrying 316 passengers and a record amount of mail, between 8,000 and 9,000 sacks. The passengers included four Japanese diplomats, one of whom was accompanied by his wife. The next morning Japan attacked Pearl Harbor and on 8 December the USA declared war on Japan. As blackout precautions Brazil's crew sealed and blacked out her portholes and painted her interior lights blue and purple. On 10 December Brazil arrived to make her scheduled call in Barbados, and British intelligence officers boarded her and removed the five Japanese.

From 17 to 25 December the crew camouflaged Brazil with grey paint. In Rio de Janeiro they painted out the Stars and Stripes painted on each side of her hull, and then near Montevideo they painted her funnel gray. Brazil reached Buenos Aires on 23 December and the crew finished painting her gray all over on Christmas Day.

Brazil then began a slow return voyage to the USA. She carried only 135 passengers, of whom 56 were Argentinian, Uruguayan and Brazilian aviation cadets on their way to be trained in the USA. This was Brazil's last civilian voyage for six and a half years.

=== As a troop ship ===
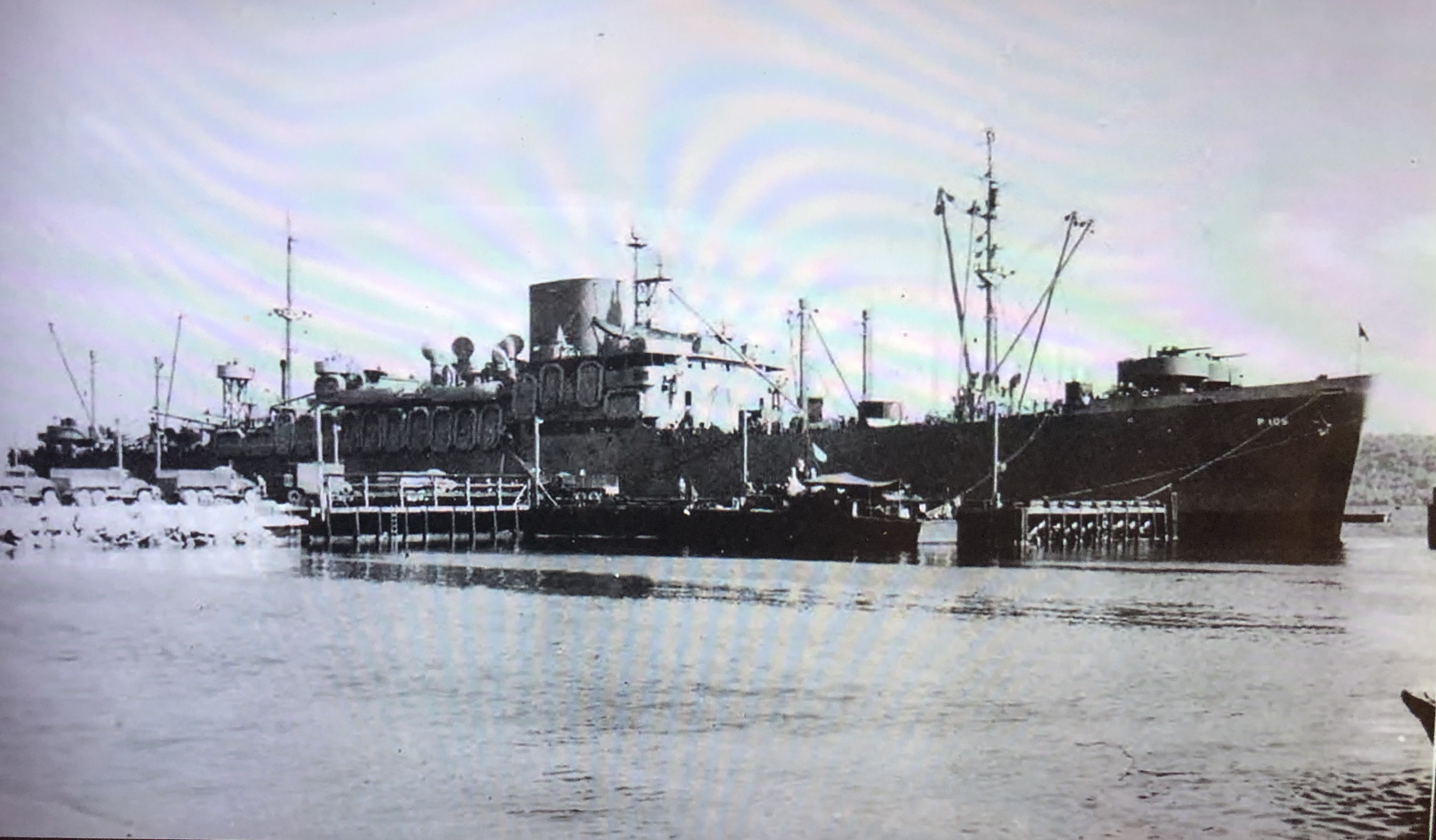
Troop ship SS Brazil at the Naval Base Manus in March, 1944.

The War Shipping Administration, which took over all ocean shipping for the duration, entered into a General Agency Agreement (GAA) with Moore McCormick to operate the ship on 4 March 1942. Brazil was converted to carry 5,155 troops to operate as one of the large, fast vessels able to sail independently when required and became one of the most active troop ships of the war.

On 19 March 1942 she sailed from Charleston, South Carolina carrying 4,000 United States Army troops via the Cape of Good Hope to Karachi, British India, where they arrived on 12 May. On 16 November 1942 Brazil left Oran, French Algeria carrying 44 Kriegsmarine prisoners of war: four officers and 40 ratings from German submarine U-595. Lockheed Hudson aircraft of No. 608 Squadron RAF had attacked and damaged the U-boat on 14 November and the crew had scuttled her close to shore near Ténès, about 150 miles (240 km) east of Oran. Brazil reached the USA on 30 November.

On 11 December Brazil and one of her sister ships, Argentina, sailed from New Jersey carrying elements of the 2nd Armored Division. On 24 December they reached Casablanca in French Morocco. Brazil made two further voyages to North Africa and was then transferred to the Pacific.

On March 9, 1943, she departed from Port Hueneme, California bringing two Seabee battalions to the South Pacific. Her service also included calls at Hobart, Tasmania; Honolulu; Bora Bora; Sydney and Bombay, before returning to San Francisco in July 1943.

Brazil was then returned to transatlantic service, taking troops to the United Kingdom and France. In October 1944 she' arrived in Boston carrying US Army personnel and prisoners of war from Europe. On 22 October she sailed from Staten Island, New York carrying the 290th Infantry Regiment and the 258th Engineer Combat Battalion, reaching Swansea, Wales on 1 November. On 1 January 1945 Brazil sailed from New York as the flagship of the 57th Ship Convoy, reaching Le Havre on 15 January. On 16 June she departed Le Havre carrying the 97th Infantry Division across the Atlantic and up the Hudson River to Camp Shanks, New York, arriving on 24 June.

After a transatlantic voyage to Marseille in July 1945 Brazil was sent via the Panama Canal to Manila, and then made two transpacific voyages to bring troops home to the USA. After repairs in San Francisco the ship made a round trip to Manila in November–December 1945. In January 1946 the ship departed San Francisco for transit of the Atlantic and stops at Liverpool, LeHavre and Southampton destined for New York. From New York the ship made three more voyages to LeHavre by May 1946.

Early in 1946 Brazil returned to transatlantic service. In March she provided "dependent transport" taking war brides and their children from Europe to the USA. She still had her cramped and spartan troopship accommodation, but on 12 June the Maritime Commission issued invitations to bid to convert Brazil back into a civilian ocean liner. On 4 August she completed her last voyage before reconversion, arriving at North River with 531 passengers from Le Havre; Southampton, England and Cobh, Ireland.

=== Post-war ===
On 13 August 1946 Brazil entered the Atlantic Basin Iron Works of New York for conversion to civilian service at a quoted $3,944,000 and completion within 200 days. Redecoration was awarded to William F. Schorn of New York at a quote of $26,850.

Brazil's fireproofing was completely revised. Fire screen bulkheads, with and fire doors controlled from her bridge, divided her into 12 fire zones. She was fitted with a fire sprinkler system, and her water intakes were fitted with filters that would allow her to draw water from the muddy bottoms of South American harbors.

Brazil's accommodation was completely rebuilt with cabins for 359 first class and 160 cabin class passengers and designed by William F Schorn, who at the same time designed the new interior of her sister ship Uruguay.

Brazil successfully made her sea trials in May 1948. The Maritime Commission restored her to Moore-McCormack Lines on 7 May: the last of the three sisters to return to civilian service.

After her refit Brazil's first class library was dedicated in memory of William Binder, Jr; a former Moore-McCormack employee who was killed in the attack on Pearl Harbor.

On 20 May Brazil sailed on her first civilian voyage since the war: a 12-day cruise to Bermuda and the Caribbean. On 4 June she left New York on the Buenos Aires run for the first time since 1941.

On 10 December 1954 Brazil left New York on a scheduled run to Buenos Aires. One day out of port she developed engine trouble and had to return for repairs. As a result, she completed her round trip a week late, reaching New York on 24 January. This was the first time in her career that Brazil had been delayed by a technical fault.

On 30 November 1957 the United States Federal Maritime Board approved Brazil's withdrawal from service, to be replaced by a new and faster Brasil already under construction. The old Brazil and her sister ship Argentina were laid up as members of the James River Reserve Fleet at Fort Eustis, Virginia, where Uruguay had already been laid up since 1954.

The ship was offered for sale 3 January 1964 with award to First Steel and Ship Corporation on 28 January for $166,698.61 with withdrawal from the fleet 11 March 1964 for scrapping.

== Sources ==
- Harnack, Edwin P (1938) [1903]. All About Ships & Shipping (7th ed.). London: Faber and Faber.
- Talbot-Booth, E.C. (1942) [1936]. Ships and the Sea (Seventh ed.). London: Sampson Low, Marston & Co. Ltd.
- Wardlow, Chester (1999). The Technical Services — The Transportation Corps: Responsibilities, Organization, and Operations. United States Army In World War II. Washington, DC: Center Of Military History, United States Army. LCCN 99490905.
