= War Shipping Administration =

World War II emergency war agency of the US government

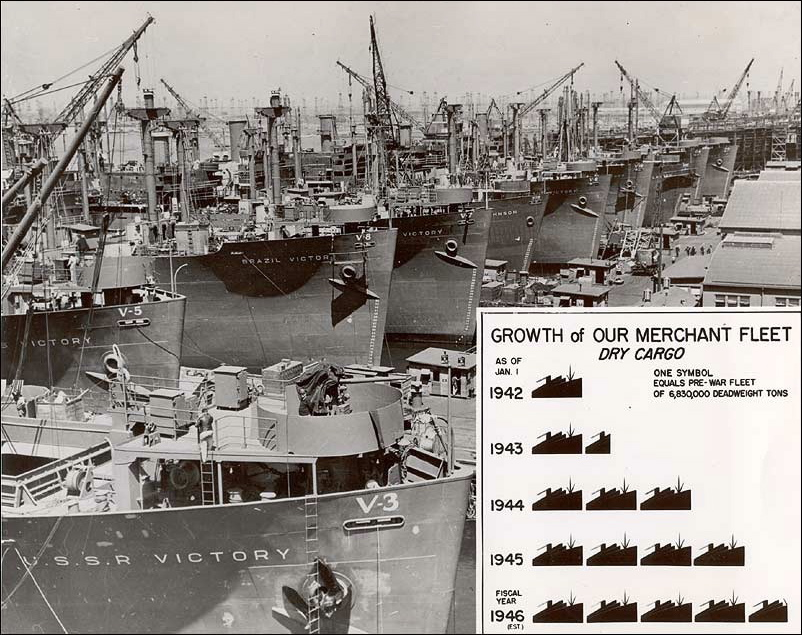
WSA press release photo showing wartime production of shipping tonnage

The War Shipping Administration (WSA) was a World War II emergency war agency of the US government, tasked to purchase and operate the civilian shipping tonnage the United States needed for fighting the war. Both shipbuilding under the Maritime Commission and ship allocation under the WSA to Army, Navy or civilian needs were closely coordinated though Vice Admiral Emory S. Land who continued as head of the Maritime Commission while also heading the WSA. Among its programs was building the fleet of Liberty Ships and Victory Ships.

== Establishment ==
A shortage of vessels further complicated by requirements to take vessels out of service for conversion and armament was of concern at the highest levels, including the President. Particular concern that available shipping would not be used effectively led to his establishment immediately on the nation's active entry into the war of the Strategic Shipping Board composed of the Chairman of the Maritime Commission, Army Chief of Staff, Chief of Naval Operations and Mr. Harry Hopkins reporting directly to the President. Differences between the organizations and lack of decisive authority short of the President limited the board's effectiveness. An additional need was an effective routine interaction with the British Ministry of War Transport, already given management of British merchant shipping, for coordination of all Allied merchant shipping. Upon establishment of the WSA the Strategic Shipping Board continued in existence in a much diminished role under the Joint Chiefs of Staff.

On February 7, 1942, the WSA was established by President Franklin Delano Roosevelt's Executive Order No. 9054. February 7, 1942 as the U.S. had entered the war. The WSA was administratively split off from the United States Maritime Commission, established in 1936, which oversaw design and construction of merchant type vessels. Those included the production of Liberty ships and Victory ships among other types. The U.S. fleet expanded to some 3,500 dry cargo vessels and over 900 high speed tankers.

== Operations ==
On a practical level The Maritime Commission and the WSA worked closely together under the administration of Vice Admiral Emory S. Land at the head of each. Land described this relationship in his report to The President of WSA's progress through December 31, 1943:

Under the Merchant Marine Act of 1936, the United States Maritime Commission was established as an independent agency to direct and control all phases of overseas shipping and shipbuilding. It became apparent immediately when this Nation entered the war that a special agency to deal with the operational problems peculiar to war was necessary to supplement the Maritime Commission. That need brought about the creation of the War Shipping Administration on February 7, 1942, which took over from the Maritime Commission virtually all of the Commission's major statutory functions with the exception of shipbuilding. Thus WSA became the Government's ship operating agency and the Maritime Commission its shipbuilding agency.

The WSA authority was extensive. In the same report to the President, Land describes the responsibility:

The responsibility of the WSA under the Executive Order of February 7, 1942, extended to all phases of shipping including the purchase or requisition of vessels for its own use or the use of the Army, Navy, or other Government agencies; the repairing, arming, and degaussing of WSA controlled vessels and Allied vessels under lend-lease provision; conversion of vessels to troop transports, hospital ships, and for other special purposes; training and providing ship personnel, operating, loading, discharging and general control of the movement of these ships; administering and marine and war risk insurance laws and funds, and the control of terminal and port facilities, forwarding and related matters.

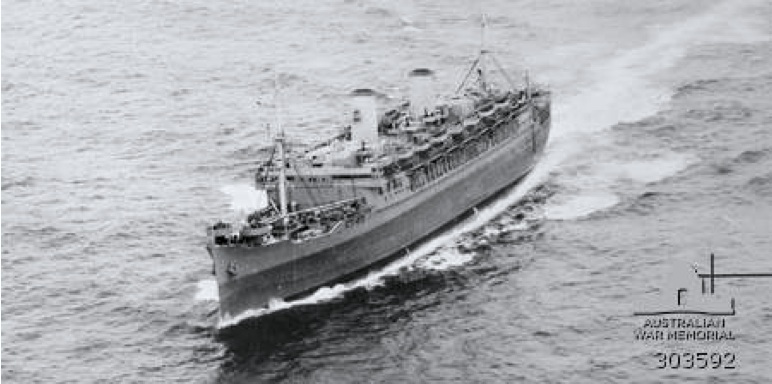
SS Mariposa, 28 March 1944.

Under that authority cargo hulls were allocated to either commerce, Army or Navy. Many of the Army's ships and Naval transports were allocated by WSA. WSA, through its agents, directly operated ships in support of the services and civilian requirements. Among the more notable WSA operated ships were large and fast troop transports able to sail largely without escort with WSA operated Argentina, Brazil, John Ericsson, Lurline, Mariposa, Monterey, and Uruguay being among those ships.

In addition, the WSA worked closely with the British Ministry of War Transport through the Combined Shipping Adjustment Board in ensuring most efficient use of available ship hulls and cargo carrying capacity.

Under the "loading, discharging and general control of the movement of these ships" WSA developed and enforced improved methods of utilizing ship capacity and avoiding inefficient use of ships by commerce and the military services.

== Postwar ==
After the war, WSA vessels were used to carry home the huge number of armed personnel overseas, as part of Operation Magic Carpet. Over 3,500,000 men were brought home from overseas areas by December 1, 1945.

On September 1, 1946, the WSA functions were returned to the Maritime Commission.

== See also ==
- Combined Shipping Adjustment Board
- United States Merchant Marine
- Victory ship
- World War II United States Merchant Navy
