= SS Argentina (1929) =

American ocean liner (1929–1958)

History

United States
- Name: SS Pennsylvania (1929–38); SS Argentina (1938–64)
- Namesake: Pennsylvania; Argentina
- Owner: American Line Steamship Corp (1929–38); US Maritime Commission (1938–64)
- Operator: Panama Pacific Line (1929–37); American Republics Line (1938–42, 1946–58); War Shipping Administration agents (1942–46)
- Port of registry: New York
- Route: New York – Havana – Panama Canal – Los Angeles – San Francisco (1929–37); New York – Barbados (outbound)/Trinidad (return) – Rio de Janeiro – Santos – Montevideo – Buenos Aires (1939–41, 1948–58)
- Builder: Newport News Shipbuilding
- Yard number: 329
- Launched: 10 July 1929
- Completed: 1929
- In service: 1929
- Out of service: 5 August 1958
- Renamed: SS Argentina (1938)
- Refit: 1938
- Home port: New York
- Identification: official number 229044; code letters MHNR (until 1933); Call sign WMDS (from 1934)
- Fate: Scrapped 1964

General characteristics
- Type: Ocean liner
- Tonnage: as Pennsylvania: 18,200 GRT, 9,702 NRT; as Argentina: 20,614 GRT, 11,324 NRT
- Length: 613 ft (187 m) o/a; 586.4 ft (178.7 m) p/p
- Beam: 80.3 ft (24.5 m)
- Depth: 20.5 ft (6.2 m)
- Propulsion: turbo-electric transmission, twin screw
- Speed: 18 knots (33 km/h; 21 mph)
- Capacity: as built: 184 first class & 365 tourist class passengers; after 1938 re-fit: 500 passengers; after 1946–47 re-fit: 359 first class and 160 cabin class; cargo: 450,000 pounds (200 tonnes), with 95,000 pounds (43 tonnes) refrigerated
- Crew: as built: 350; after 1938 re-fit: 380
- Sensors & processing systems: direction finding equipment; gyrocompass (from 1934)
- Notes: sister ships: SS California (SS Uruguay); SS Virginia (SS Brazil)

SS Argentina was a US turbo-electric ocean liner. She was completed in 1929 as SS Pennsylvania, and refitted and renamed as SS Argentina in 1938. From 1942 to 1946 she was the War Shipping Administration operated troopship Argentina. She was laid up in 1958 and scrapped in 1964.

== Building ==
Pennsylvania was the last of three sister ships built by the Newport News Shipbuilding and Drydock Company of Newport News, Virginia for the American Line Steamship Corporation, which at the time was part of J. P. Morgan's International Mercantile Marine Co. Pennsylvania was launched on 10 July 1929. She joined SS California (launched in 1927) and SS Virginia (launched in 1928) in the fleet of American Lines' Panama Pacific Lines subsidiary.

Pennsylvania was a steamship, with oil-fired furnaces heating her boilers to power two General Electric steam turbo generators supplying current for her electric propulsion motors.

Pennsylvania was equipped with submarine signalling apparatus and wireless direction finding equipment, and from about 1934 she was equipped with a gyrocompass.

Some of Pennsylvania's first class cabins had en suite bathrooms.

With Panama Pacific Lines, Pennsylvania's two funnels would have been red with a blue top, with a white band dividing the blue from the red.

== SS Pennsylvania ==
SS Pennsylvania filmed in the 1930s

Panama Pacific Line, part of the American Line Steamship Corp, operated Pennsylvania and her sisters between New York and San Francisco via the Panama Canal until 1938. California, Virginia and Pennsylvania were subsidised to carry mail on this route for the United States Postal Service.

In June 1937 the United States Congress withdrew all maritime mail subsidies, which by then included a total of $450,000 per year for Panama Pacific's three liners. At the beginning of March 1938 the Panama Canal tolls were revised, increasing Panama Pacific's costs by $37,000 per year. As a result of these cost increases and continuing labor difficulties Panama Pacific discontinued its New York – California service and took all three liners out of service.

== SS Argentina ==
The US Maritime Commission took over the three sister ships in 1937 and had them extensively refurbished. Each was fireproofed to comply with Federal safety regulations, which had been revised as a result of the fire in 1934 that destroyed the liner Morro Castle.

Pennsylvania's passenger capacity was revised to 500. She was equipped to carry 450,000 pounds (200 tonnes) of cargo, of which 95,000 pounds (43 tonnes) was refrigerated. Pennsylvania had been built with two funnels but during the refit this was reduced to one. The refit increased Pennsylvania's tonnage by about 2,000 tons.

On 4 October 1938 Moore-McCormack Lines contracted to operate California, Virginia, Pennsylvania and 10 cargo ships between the US and South America as part of President Franklin D. Roosevelt's Good Neighbor policy. Moore-McCormack renamed the three passenger liners Argentina, Brazil and Uruguay, and assigned them to the fleet of its American Republics Lines subsidiary.

With Moore-McCormack Lines Argentina's funnel would have been buff with a black top. A broad green band divided the buff from the black. On each side of the funnel the green band bore a red capital M within a white disk.

Moore-McCormack put the three sisters into service between New York and Buenos Aires via the Caribbean, Brazil and Montevideo. Argentina made her first trip on this route in November 1938.

On 8 December 1941 the USA joined the Second World War and on 27 December Argentina arrived in New York from South America. By 2 January she had loaded cargo and 200 passengers had booked to sail on her the next day for South America. However, the War Shipping Administration intervened, cancelling her sailing and requisitioning her to be a US Army Transport troopship.

== Troop ship ==
During the war Argentina, one of the large, fast vessels able to sail independently when required, was operated by the War Shipping Administration's agents and allocated to Army troop transport.

On 23 January 1942 Argentina loaded and sailed from the New York Port of Embarkation as the flagship of a convoy of seven troopships, designated Convoy BT.200, under United States Navy escort reaching Melbourne, Australia on 27 February. At the time this troop movement of POPPY FORCE, also designated Task Force 6814, destined for New Caledonia by way of Australia was the largest attempted with the entire convoy having a troop capacity of almost 22,000. After reorganizing loading that had hastily loaded in New York the convoy, redesignated ZK.7, departed Melbourne for New Caledonia 7 March and arrived 12 March 1942 where later the force was organized into the Americal Division under General Alexander Patch.

On 22 April Argentina sailed from San Francisco carrying the United States Army 32nd Infantry Division. She reached Port Adelaide, Australia on 14 May.

She sailed mid May with hundreds of Australian RAAF aircrew bound for Canada and flight training under the Empire Air Training scheme. A ships menu dated 22 May shows they were well catered for en route.

On 20 June Argentina arrived in New York. She embarked elements of the USAAF Eighth Air Force including famed fighter ace Robin Olds, and the United States Army 5th Corps and the Army's entire 56th Signal Battalion. She left New York under naval escort on 1 July and reached Gourock, Scotland on 15 July.

On 11 December 1942 Argentina and one of her sister ships, Brazil, sailed from New Jersey carrying elements of the 2nd Armored Division. On 24 December they reached Casablanca in French Morocco. Early in 1943 Argentina made a second transatlantic crossing to Casablanca.

In April 1943 Argentina left the US for Algiers and Oran in French Algeria, then Gibraltar, the Firth of Clyde, Scotland; Freetown, Sierra Leone; Durban, South Africa and back to Casablanca. In August 1943 she sailed to Argentina and thence to Liverpool, England.

In October 1943 Argentina left the US for the United Kingdom; Augusta, Sicily; Bari, Italy and Algiers. She got back to New York in December and then made three crossings from Boston to the Clyde. After the last of those crossings she arrived in New York in April 1944, and then made six more crossings to the UK.

On 27 August 1944, the Argentina left New York Harbor and sailed to Cherbourg transporting members of the 104th Infantry Regiment, a sub-division of the 26th Infantry Division.

In December 1944 Argentina left the USA on a voyage to Naples, Marseille, Oran and Gibraltar, returning to Boston in January 1945. She then made four transatlantic crossings to Le Havre, France and Southampton, England. From the first three she returned to New York, but from the last she returned to Boston.

In June 1945 Argentina left Southampton bringing elements of the 56th Signal Battalion back to the USA. The next month she brought home from Europe 5,000 troops of the USAAF 454th Bombardment Wing and 15th Air Force, reaching New York on 28 July. Argentina then made a voyage to Taranto and Naples in Italy; one to Marseille, Algiers and Naples; one to Marseille; one to Plymouth, England and Le Havre and another to Le Havre.

On 16 November 1945 Argentina arrived in New York from Le Havre carrying 4,206 soldiers, 130 civilians, 124 nurses and 88 German scientists. The OSS had brought the scientists to the USA under Operation Paperclip to obtain German scientific and technical secrets. In an attempt to maintain secrecy the soldiers, civilians and nurses were kept on board while the scientists were disembarked and whisked away in a small fleet of waiting buses.

After her last troop voyage Argentina reached New York on 1 January 1946. During and after the war she made a total of 56 troop voyages, covered 335,906 nautical miles (622,098 km) and carried at least 175,592 soldiers.

On 16 January 1946 Herbert Lamoureux, Ex-Sergeant in the USAAF, jumped from the S.S. Argentina Five (5) miles off Plymouth England and tried to swim ashore to see his English wife, Vera, and their baby, Elaine. Herbert was returned to England on another boat and allowed 24 hours leave in Liverpool with his wife and child. Herbert later returned to the US with his wife and daughter, raising a family with his wife Vera in Gardner Massachusetts with later children Diane, William, Elizabeth (Betty) and Michael.

On 26 January 1946 Argentina left Southampton as a "dependent transport" carrying the first 452 war brides, one war groom and 173 children to the US in the Army's highly publicized "Operation Diaper's" European phase. The brides came from England, Scotland, Wales, Northern Ireland and Malta. Due to stormy weather the ship reached New York a day late on 4 February. As she was the first war bride ship she was greeted by New York Mayor William O'Dwyer, a band, news cameras and 200 reporters.

On 6 May 1946 SS Argentina was meant to carry 411 passengers to Cobh, Ireland and Southampton, but she was delayed by a labor dispute. When she was a US Army Transport, Argentina's crew had worked a shift system of eight hours on and 12 hours off. Now that she was back in civilian service, Moore-McCormack Lines wanted her crew to return to a passenger shift system of nine hours on and 13 off, but the National Maritime Union disagreed.

On 12 July Argentina arrived in New York from Southampton. Her passengers included another 452 British war brides 173 children and one bridegroom. On 19 July she left New York carrying 519 passengers to Southampton and Le Havre. She completed her last "dependent transport" voyage on 31 August.

== Post-war ==
For her first six months carrying civilian passengers, Argentina still had her cramped and spartan troopship accommodation. Then on 4 November 1946 she entered Bethlehem Shipbuilding Corporation's 56th St Shipyard in Brooklyn, New York, to be refitted as a civilian liner again. Her new accommodation had cabins for 359 first class and 160 cabin class passengers and was designed by Donald Deskey Associates, who gave her various state rooms nine different color schemes.

On 3 June 1947 it was announced that Argentina's re-fit would be completed on 15 July and that she would return to the New York – Buenos Aires route on 25 July. Instead strike action by Bethlehem Shipbuilding workers delayed the work for several months and it was not until 30 December that she left the shipyard for her final 14 hours of sea trials. On 1 January 1948 Argentina was restored to Moore-McCormack, which reported that her first two voyages were "booked full".

On 14 January 1948 Argentina was given the US Navy Reserve pennant. On the same day her library was dedicated in memory of Henry Olin Billings, a former Moore-McCormack employee who was killed on 1 November 1942 when his command, the Liberty Ship SS George Thacher, was torpedoed off the coast of French Equatorial Africa.

On 15 January Argentina left New York on Moore-McCormack's South America run; the first of the three sisters to return to their pre-war civilian route. The round trip was scheduled to take 38 days, with two-way fares starting at $1,030 for first class and $630 for cabin class.

In the spring of 1950 newspaper and television cameras photographed Captain Thomas Simmons of the Argentina and Captain William Brophy on a tugboat of the McAllister Towing Company communicating by walkie-talkie, demonstrating how this form of radio helped to maneuver ships in port.

On 14 September 1950, two days out of Port of Spain, Trinidad, Argentina met a large schooner that had sailed from Las Palmas, Gran Canaria, with 119 men aboard bound for Venezuela. The schooner was off-course, almost out of food and other supplies and was flying distress signals. Argentina replenished the schooner's food and water stores and put her back on course for Venezuela.

Argentina reached New York at the end of her last South American voyage on 5 August 1958. She and Brazil were laid up as members of the National Defense Reserve Fleet on the James River at Fort Eustis, Virginia, where Uruguay had already been laid up since 1954.

Late in 1963 the United States Department of Commerce offered Uruguay for sale. In 1964 she was sold for scrap to Peck Iron and Metals of Norfolk, Virginia. Peck re-sold her on to Luria Bros who scrapped her at Kearny, New Jersey.

== Notable passengers and visitors ==
In 1941, future U.S. President John F. Kennedy sailed on "Argentina" from the US to Brazil and Argentina.

In 1948 the adventurer Sasha Siemel sailed on Argentina from Brazil to the USA. When the ship docked in New York he gave ABC a filmed interview aboard about hunting jaguars in Mato Grosso.

In New York in April 1948 the cast of the Broadway play Mister Roberts, including Henry Fonda, judged a fashion show aboard Argentina.

On 5 November 1948 photographer and film-maker Ruth Orkin sailed aboard Argentina to film and write about her passengers for Coronet magazine.

On 21 April 1949 Opera singer Maria Callas sailed en route to Buenos Aires from Italy, to sing for the first time in Teatro Colon.

On 18 February 1950 Harry Sandford Brown, Chairman of the Foster Wheeler Corporation, died aboard Argentina while en route from New York to Rio de Janeiro.

In March 1951 Clark Gable and his then wife Sylvia Ashley came aboard Argentina to see friends off on a voyage.

The tennis star, model and radio presenter Jinx Falkenburg sailed on Argentina early in the 1950s.

On 8 January 1953 Emmet J McCormack, co-founder of Moore-McCormack Lines, boarded Argentina with his wife. Albert V Moore, his fellow co-founder, visited him aboard at 1700 hrs to see him off. Moore returned ashore and died at 2300 hrs that evening.

The Italian tenor Tito Schipa and his wife Antoinette "Lilli" Michel were photographed sailing on Argentina (date not recorded).

== Sources ==
- Bykofsky, Joseph; Larson, Harold (1990). The Technical Services—The Transportation Corps: Operations Overseas. United States Army In World War II. Washington, DC: Center Of Military History, United States Army. LCCN 56060000.
- Gill, G. Hermon (1968). Royal Australian Navy 1939–1942. Australia in the War of 1939–1945. Series 2 – Navy. Vol. 2. Canberra: Australian War Memorial.
- Harnack, Edwin P (1938) [1903]. All About Ships & Shipping (7th ed.). London: Faber and Faber.
- Leighton, Richard M; Coakley, Robert W (1995). The War Department — Global Logistics And Strategy 1940–1943. United States Army In World War II. Washington, DC: Center Of Military History, United States Army. p. 157. LCCN 55060001.
- Matloff, Maurice; Snell, Edwin M. (1999). The War Department: Strategic Planning For Coalition Warfare 1941–1942. United States Army In World War II. Washington, DC: Center Of Military History, United States Army. LCCN 53061477.
- Talbot-Booth, E.C. (1942) [1936]. Ships and the Sea (Seventh ed.). London: Sampson Low, Marston & Co. Ltd.
- Thompson, George Raynor; Harris, Dixie R. (1966). The Technical Services—The Signal Corps: The Outcome (Mid-1943 Through 1945). United States Army In World War II. Washington, DC: Center Of Military History, United States Army. LCCN 64060001.
- Wardlow, Chester (1999). The Technical Services — The Transportation Corps: Responsibilities, Organization, and Operations. United States Army In World War II. Washington, DC: Center Of Military History, United States Army. LCCN 99490905.
