= 754th Bombardment Squadron =

United States Army Air Forces unit

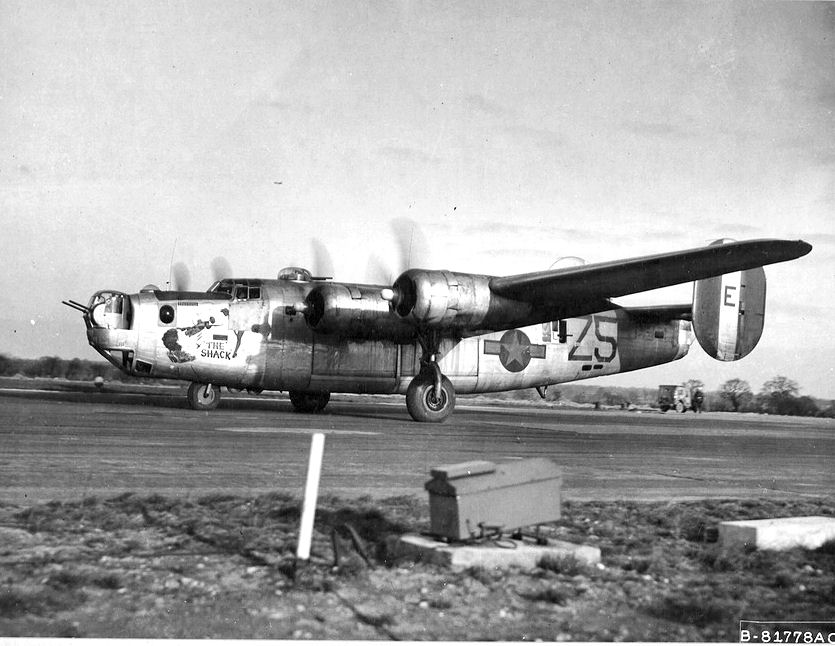
- 754th Squadron B-24J Liberator (Note: Aircraft is Consolidated B-24J-155-CO Liberator, serial 44-40298, Z5-E, The Shack.)
- Active: 1943-1945
- Country: United States
- Branch: United States Air Force
- Role: Heavy bomber
- Engagements: European Theater of Operations

Insignia
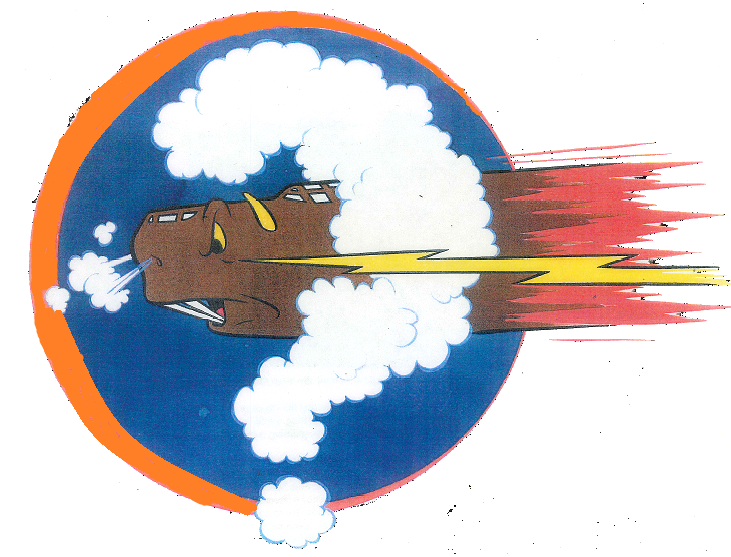
- 754th Bombardment Squadron emblem (Note: pproved 20 January 1945. Description: Over and through a medium blue disc, within an orange decrescent moon, the nose of a caricatured, brown, B-24 aircraft with yellow eye and horn, snorting steam from the nostrils, in flight toward dexter, tail segment terminating in orange comet formation, behind a large, white cloud in the shape of a question mark, all surmounted by a jagged, yellow lightning flash, striking in direction of plane.)
- Fuselage code: Z5

The 754th Bombardment Squadron is a former United States Army Air Forces unit. The squadron was first activated in July 1943. After training with Consolidated B-24 Liberator heavy bombers in the United States, it deployed to the European Theater of Operations, where it participated in the strategic bombing campaign against Germany. Following V-E Day, the squadron returned to the United States, where it began training with Boeing B-29 Superfortresses, but was inactivated in October 1945.

== History ==
=== Training in the United States ===
The 754th Bombardment Squadron was activated at Wendover Field, Utah on 1 July 1943 as one of the four original squadrons of the 458th Bombardment Group. Before the month ended, the squadron moved to Gowen Field, Idaho, drawing its initial cadre from the 52d Bombardment Squadron. The air echelon of the squadron's cadre immediately departed for Orlando Army Air Base, where they spent the next two months participating in specialized tactical training. In September 1943, the air and ground echelons of the squadron were united at Kearns Army Air Base, Utah before proceeding to Wendover to begin the first phase of training with the Consolidated B-24 Liberator.

At Wendover, most of the initial combat crews were assigned to the squadron. By the end of the year, the squadron completed its training and began moving to the European Theater of Operations. The ground echelon departed its final training base, Tonopah Army Air Field, Nevada, for the port of embarkation on 29 December 1943, sailing for England on the USS Florence Nightingale (AP-70). The air echelon assembled at Hamilton Field, then ferried its Liberators to England via the southern ferry route.

=== Combat in Europe ===
The squadron arrived at its combat station, RAF Horsham St. Faith, on 1 February 1944, although the last bombers of the 458th Group did not arrive until 16 February. It entered the strategic bombing campaign against Germany during Big Week, but its first missions, flown on 24 and 25 February 1944, were diversionary missions, not strikes against the German aircraft manufacturing industry. On 2 March it began flying strategic bombardment missions. Its targets included an aircraft manufacturing plant at Brandenburg an der Havel, an airfield near Braunschweig, a fuel depot at Dulmen, oil refineries near Hamburg, marshalling yards at Hamm, an aircraft engine manufacturing factory at Magdeburg, the shipping canal at Minden, aircraft factories at Oschersleben and the industrial area of Saarbrücken.

The squadron was occasionally diverted from the strategic bombing campaign to conduct air interdiction and close air support missions. It helped prepare for Operation Overlord, the invasion of Normandy, by striking artillery batteries, V-1 flying bomb and V-2 rocket launching sites, and airfields in France. On D-Day, it attacked coastal defenses to support the amphibious landings. Afterward, it attacked lines of communication to prevent the movement of enemy personnel and materiel from reaching the battlefield. It attacked enemy troops during Operation Cobra, the breakout from the beachhead through Saint Lo in late July. It also flew support missions during the Battle of the Bulge in December 1944 and January 1945 and during Operation Varsity, the airborne attacks across the Rhine in April 1945. In addition, the squadron stopped its bombing in September 1944 to transport gasoline to airfields in France to supply the Third Army, which had outrun its supply lines (called Operation Truckin'). These were not considered combat missions. The squadron flew its last combat mission on 24 April 1945.

=== Return and inactivation ===
During May 1945, the squadron flew "Trolley" missions. These missions transported ground personnel of the unit over target areas on the continent to permit them to see the results of their contributions to the squadron mission. The squadron returned to the United States in June 1945, with aircraft beginning to depart for Bradley Field, Connecticut on 14 June. The ground echelon sailed on the RMS Queen Mary on 6 July. The squadron assembled at Sioux Falls Army Air Field, South Dakota in July. At Sioux Falls, all personnel who had not been discharged were transferred to other units.

The squadron reformed at Walker Army Air Field, Kansas, moving to March Field, California in August, once the group had achieved 20% manning. At March Field, it trained with the Boeing B-29 Superfortress very heavy bomber, but never approached authorized manning. It was inactivated there in October 1945.

== Lineage ==
- Constituted as the 754th Bombardment Squadron (Heavy) on 19 May 1943

Activated on 1 July 1943
Redesignated 754th Bombardment Squadron, Heavy 20 August 1943
Redesignated 754th Bombardment Squadron, Very Heavy on 5 August 1945
Inactivated on 17 October 1945

=== Assignments ===
- 458th Bombardment Group, 1 July 1943 – 17 October 1945

=== Stations ===
- Wendover Field, Utah, 1 July 1943
- Gowen Field, Idaho, 28 July 1943
- Kearns Army Air Base, Utah, 10 September 1943
- Wendover Field, Utah, 15 September 1943
- Tonopah Army Air Field, Nevada, 4 November 1943 – 1 January 1944
- RAF Horsham St. Faith (Station 123), England, 1 February 1944 – 3 July 1945
- Sioux Falls Army Air Field, South Dakota, 15 July 1945
- Walker Army Air Field, Kansas, 25 July 1945
- March Field, California, 22 August-17 October 1945

=== Aircraft ===
- Consolidated B-24 Liberator, 1943–1945
- Boeing B-29 Superfortress, 1945

=== Campaigns ===
Campaign Streamer	Campaign	Dates	Notes
	Air Offensive, Europe	1 February 1944–5 June 1944	754th Bombardment Squadron
	Air Combat, EAME Theater	1 February 1944–11 May 1945	754th Bombardment Squadron
	Normandy	6 June 1944–24 July 1944	754th Bombardment Squadron
	Northern France	25 July 1944–14 September 1944	754th Bombardment Squadron
	Rhineland	15 September 1944–21 March 1945	754th Bombardment Squadron
	Ardennes-Alsace	16 December 1944–25 January 1945	754th Bombardment Squadron
	Central Europe	22 March 1944–21 May 1945	754th Bombardment Squadron

== See also ==
- B-24 Liberator units of the United States Army Air Forces
