= Moore-McCormack =

Series of shipping lines

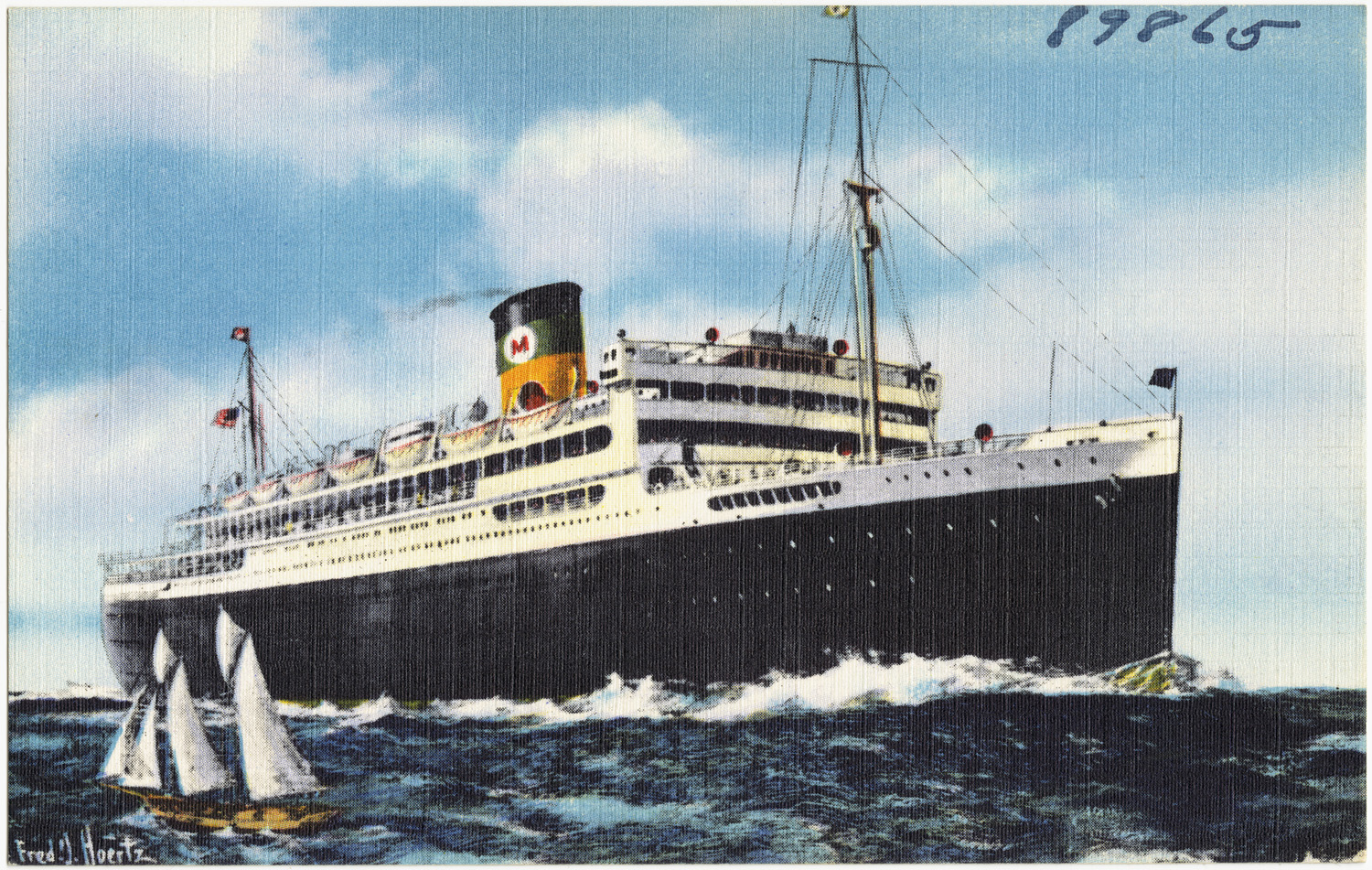
From 1938 Moore-McCormack ran the "Good Neighbor Fleet" liners Uruguay, Brazil and Argentina between New York and the east coast of South America

The Moore-McCormack Lines was a series of companies operating as shipping lines, operated by the Moore-McCormack Company, Incorporated, later Moore-McCormack Lines, Incorporated, and simply Mooremack, founded in 1913 in New York City. It ceased trading on its buy-out in 1982. The founders were Albert V. Moore (1880–1953) (director/president) and Emmet J. McCormack (director/treasurer), with Mr Molloy (director/secretary).

From a small start with one ship, SS Montara, inaugurating a run from the United States to Brazil, the shipping line expanded to become a major US line operating around the world.

Moore-McCormack's original offices were at 29 Broadway (now still a general office building), but were moved in 1919 to 5 Broadway (now Berkshire Bank) and to 2 Broadway, two floors, when the building opened.

== History ==
=== 1913–1919 (World War I) ===
Moore-McCormack Lines' first run was with Montara, intended to be a shipment of dynamite from Wilmington, Delaware, to Rio de Janeiro in Brazil, but, with the load not ready, the ship took coal from Norfolk, Virginia, to Searsport, Maine destined for Aroostook County, Maine, before returning for the dynamite. It had been built in 1881 and was retired after this trip.

The company then acquired various small steamers, including a Great Lakes vessel renamed Mooremack, which were operated profitably during World War I. Additionally, chartered ships including passenger ships added to the South American runs that, by 1919, included Recife in Pernambuco, Bahia, Santos, Montevideo and Buenos Aires.

=== Inter-war years ===
After the war, the US government offered surplus ships to US shipping companies. Mooremack received several ships, which expanded its fleet and opportunities for trade, including in 1920 and 1921 to the Levant and India. Runs were established, briefly, to Ireland, but ended by 1925. Ships also went into the Mediterranean and to Black Sea ports including Russian, the first American-flag ships to Soviet Union ports.

In 1928, Vice President Robert C. Lee negotiated for Mooremack to become shipping agents for the Soviet Union using the American Scantic Line, having bought the line from the US Government. He later negotiated with the government of Poland for Mooremack to be part of the establishment of Gdynia as Poland's sea port. This also led to the establishment of trade from Czechoslovakia, Hungary, and Austria through Gdynia in competition with German ports, which was a factor in the German invasion of Czechoslovakia and Poland at the outbreak of World War II.

=== 1938 consolidation ===
On 8 September 1938, there was a consolidation of nine companies within the group to become Moore-McCormack Lines, Incorporated, capitalized at US$4.8m. On 4 October, Moore-McCormack contracted to operate ten cargo ships and three ocean liners belonging to the United States Maritime Commission between the US and South America as the Good Neighbor Fleet. The passenger liners were the former Panama Pacific Line 20,000-gross register ton (GRT) turbo-electric steamships California, Virginia and Pennsylvania, which were renamed Uruguay, Brazil and Argentina to reflect their new route between New York and Buenos Aires via Rio de Janeiro, Santos and Montevideo.

== World War II ==
From 1936, the US Government had supported the expansion of US flag shipping. Mccormick Steamship Company had begun a building program, but as the war began four of its Type C3 ships were requisitioned. These were Rio-class ships of 17,600 tons displacement and designed to carry 150 passengers. Thus Rio Hudson, Rio Parana, Rio de la Plata and Rio de Janeiro became Royal Navy Avenger-class escort carriers HMS Avenger, HMS Biter, HMS Charger and HMS Dasher. Trade increased after the outbreak of the European war and Mooremack shifted some 20 million tons of cargo destined for that theatre, including whole trains for Russia.

The United States's entry into World War II brought various opportunities for Mooremack, along with many of its ships being taken into US Navy service. The Good Neighbor liners Uruguay, Brazil and Argentina became United States Army Transportation Corps troop ships. The Type C3 cargo ships Mormacstar, Mormacsun, Mormactide and Mormacyork became the United States Navy's Elizabeth C. Stanton-class transport ships Elizabeth C. Stanton, Florence Nightingale, Lyon and Anne Arundel. The Type C3 ships Mormacmail and Mormacland became the Long Island-class escort carriers USS Long Island and HMS Archer, and other Mooremack C3s became Navy transports.

Mccormick Steamship Company was active with charter shipping with the Maritime Commission and War Shipping Administration. During wartime, the Mccormick Steamship Company operated Victory ships and Liberty ships. The ship was run by its Mccormick Steamship Company crew and the US Navy supplied United States Navy Armed Guards to man the deck guns and radio. The most common armament mounted on these merchant ships were the MK II 20mm Oerlikon autocannon and the 3"/50, 4"/50, and 5"/38 deck guns.

== Post-war ==
The aftermath of the war had Mooremack owning 41 ships and, in 1946, 76 chartered ships from the US Maritime Commission. In 1949, Mooremack repaid a government loan subsidizing the South American services, and repaid its mortgages, thus essentially owning its fleet.

Mooremack was involved in the Korean War. Notably, its cargo ship SS Meredith Victory rescued some 14,000 refugees from Hungnam in December 1950.

In 1954, Mooremack withdrew the liner Uruguay from its New York – River Plate route, leaving Brazil and Argentina to continue a reduced service. Uruguay was laid up in the National Defense Reserve Fleet in the James River, Virginia. In 1958, Mooremack introduced a new SS Brasil and SS Argentina to the route, while the old Brazil and Argentina joined Uruguay in the Reserve Fleet on the James River. The new pair of liners worked the route until 1969, when declining passenger numbers made them unprofitable and Mooremack laid them up.

In 1964–1965, Mooremack placed its Constellation-class freight liners in service, Mormacargo, Mormaclynx, Mormacvega, Mormacdraco, Mormacaltair and Mormacrigel. The fast, state of the art vessels completed Mooremack's modernization program begun in 1956. On 11 February 1966, Mormacaltair set sail from New York for Europe, establishing the first regularly scheduled transatlantic container service. Within weeks, Mooremack was joined by United States Lines and Sea-Land Service, but Mooremack failed to exploit its first-off-the-mark lead and make the investment in fully cellular container ships necessary to realize the maximum efficiencies and cost savings that containerization promised. Left behind by U.S., British and European ship lines and container line consortia, Mooremack abandoned the North Atlantic trade in 1970 to concentrate on its cargo routes to South America and Africa, and sold four brand new combination break-bulk, container, roll-on/roll-off ships to American Export-Isbrandtsen Lines to offset losses. The idled 1958 liners Argentina and Brasil were sold to Holland America Line in 1972.

Mooremack had two of its newest freight liners, Mormacaltair and Mormadraco of 1965, lengthened and converted into partial cellular container ships in 1975–1976. The four other "Connies" of 1964–1965 were similarly converted in 1982. Diversification into the natural resources and energy fields proved not to be as profitable as the company had hoped, and the energy crisis of the late 1970s and business recession of the early 1980s made operating costs unsustainable. Malcom McLean's United States Lines bought out Moore-McCormack in December 1982, and its remaining ships were absorbed into the US Lines fleet and later sold off or turned over to the Maritime Administration (MARAD). (Subsequently, Mormacaltair in 1990 was converted into a crane ship, USS Green Mountain State (T-ACS-9) for MSC, and in 1991 Mormacdraco also into USS Beaver State (T-ACS-10). Mormacdraco/Beaver State then underwent a further conversion in 2009 into USS Pacific Tracker (XTR-1) for the Missile Defense Agency. The ex-States Steamship acquired ship, Mormactide, was converted in 1988 into the school ship, TS Empire State VI (TAP 1001) for the New York State Maritime College.

== Operating companies ==
Mooremack's operating subsidiaries included American Republics Line, American Scantic Line and Pacific Republics Line.

== Notable people ==
Notable officials and people associated with Mooremack include:

- Rear Admiral Robert C. Lee, vice president
- James R. Barker, former chairman and CEO (1971–1988)
- Robert E. O'Brien - Director and President - Moore McCormack Lines

== Passenger fleet ==
Ship	Year built	Years In Service for Line	Specifications	Current Status	Notes
SS Uruguay	1928	1938-1942 1948–1954	Length - 601 feet; Breadth - 80 feet; Displacement - 32,450 tons; Turbine - Electric; Twin Screw Passengers: 750	Scrapped 1964	Built as the California at Newport News Shipbuilding & Drydock Co., Ltd., in Virginia in 1928
SS Brazil	1928	1938-1942 1948–1957	Length - 613 feet; Breadth - 80 feet; Displacement - 32,816 tons; Turbine - Electric; Twin Screw; Speed - 17.0 to 18.5 knots. First Class Passengers - 184; Tourist Class - 365; Crew - 350	Scrapped 1964	Built as the Virginia at Newport News Shipbuilding & Drydock Co., Ltd., in Virginia in 1928
SS Argentina	1929	1938-1942 1948–1957	Length - 613 feet; Breadth - 80.4 feet; Displacement - 32,816 tons; Turbine - Electric; Twin Screw; Speed - 17.0 to 18.5 knots. First Class Passengers - 184; Tourist Class - 365; Crew - 350	Scrapped 1964	Built as the Pennsylvania at Newport News Shipbuilding & Drydock Co., Ltd., in Virginia in 1929
SS Brasil	1958	1958-1969	Length - 617'6" Beam - 84' Draft - 27'3" Passengers - 557	Scrapped 2005	Built at Ingalls Shipyards, Pascagoula, Mississippi
SS Argentina	1958	1958-1969	Length - 617'6" Beam - 84' Draft - 27'3" Passengers - 557	Scrapped 2004	Built at Ingalls Shipyards, Pascagoula, Mississippi

== War ship lost ==
- George Thatcher Nov. 1, 1942 torpedoed
- Mark Hanna March 9, 1943 torpedoed, but repaired
- Henry Miller Jan. 3, 1945 torpedoed

== See also ==
- SS Mormacpine Moore-McCormack, cargo ship 1947 -1970
