= 458th Air Expeditionary Group =

458th Air Expeditionary Group

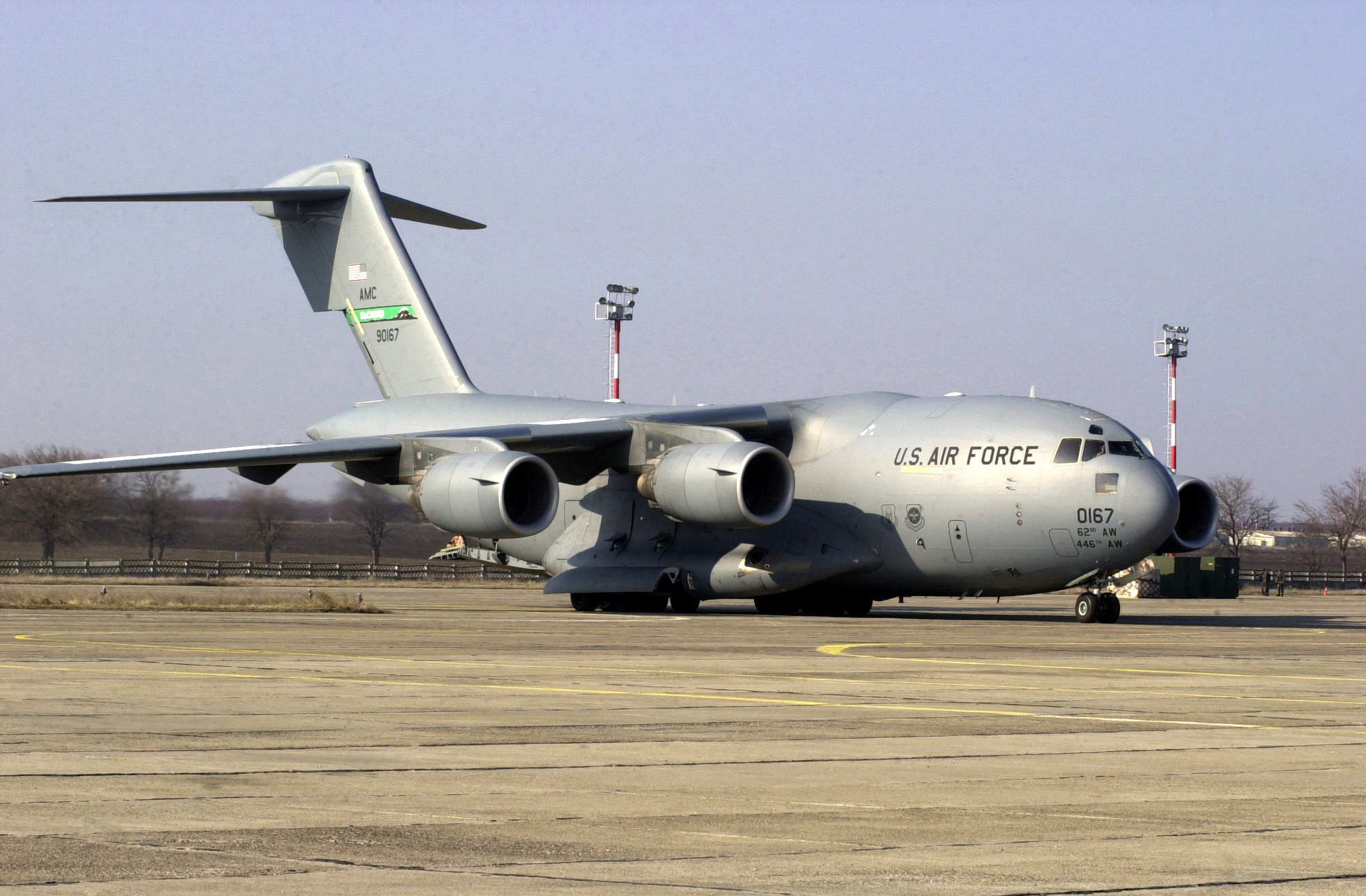
- A C-17A Globemaster III of the 458th Air Expeditionary Group at Mihail Kogălniceanu Air Base
- Active: 1943–1945; 1992–1995; 2004; 2006 (twice); 2007 (twice); 2007–2011
- Country: United States
- Branch: United States Air Force
- Role: Air Expeditionary
- Part of: United States Air Forces in Europe
- Engagements: European Theater of Operations
- Decorations: Air Force Outstanding Unit Award

The 458th Air Expeditionary Group is a provisional United States Air Force unit assigned to United States Air Forces in Europe to activate or inactivate as needed. The most recent known activation of the unit was at Ramstein Air Base, Germany in 2011.

The group was first activated during World War II as the 458th Bombardment Group. After training with Consolidated B-24 Liberator heavy bombers in the United States, it deployed to the European Theater of Operations, where it participated in the strategic bombing campaign against Germany. Following V-E Day, the squadron returned to the United States, where it began training with Boeing B-29 Superfortresses. It was inactivated in October 1945.

The squadron was activated as the 458th Operations Group in 1992, when the air refueling mission was transferred from Strategic Air Command to Air Mobility Command in 1992. It was inactivated once its assets were reassigned to air mobility units in 1994. In 2001, the group was converted to provisional status.

== History ==
=== World War II ===
==== Training in the United States ====
The 458th Bombardment Group was activated at Wendover Field, Utah on 1 July 1943, with the 752d, 753d, 754th and 755th Bombardment Squadrons assigned. In July, the group moved to Gowen Field, Idaho to begin organizing, drawing its initial cadre from the 29th Bombardment Group. The air echelon of the group's cadre immediately departed for Orlando Army Air Base, where they spent the next two months participating in specialized tactical training. In September 1943, the air and ground echelons of the group were united at Kearns Army Air Base, Utah, before proceeding to Wendover to begin the first phase of training with the Consolidated B-24 Liberator.

At Wendover, most of the initial combat crews were assigned to the group. By the end of 1943, the 458th completed its training and began moving to the European Theater of Operations. The ground echelon departed its final training base, Tonopah Army Air Field, Nevada, where it had been the first heavy bomber group to train, for the port of embarkation at Camp Shanks, New York, on 1 January 1944. (Note: Freeman says the ground echelon left on 29 December. Maurer says 1 January, while the group's history gives the 29th as the date the group's advance party left, while the rest of the group's ground echelon departed Wendover by troop train on 1 January.) They sailed to England on the USS Florence Nightingale (AP-70). The air echelon assembled at Hamilton Field, then ferried its Liberators to England via the southern ferry route.

==== Combat in Europe ====
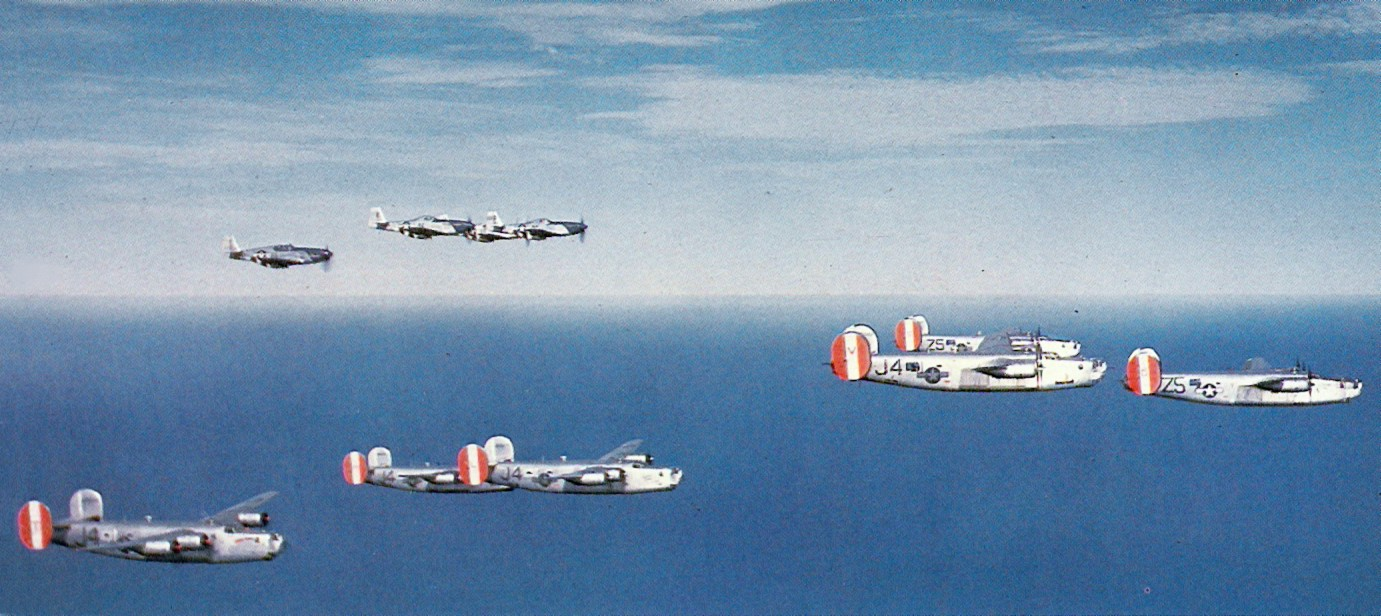
B-24 Liberators of the 458th Bombardment Group over the North Sea (Note: The fighter escorts are North American P-51 Mustangs of the 352d Fighter Group)

The group arrived at its combat station, RAF Horsham St. Faith near Norwich in eastern England on 1 February 1944. Aircrews had begun arriving on 24 January. The last bombers of the 458th arrived on 16 February. It entered the strategic bombing campaign against Germany during Big Week. Its first missions, flown on 24 and 25 February 1944, were diversionary missions, not strikes against the German aircraft manufacturing industry.

On 2 March it began flying strategic bombardment missions. Its targets included an aircraft manufacturing plant at Brandenburg an der Havel, an airfield near Braunschweig, a fuel depot at Dulmen, oil refineries near Hamburg, marshalling yards at Hamm, an aircraft engine manufacturing factory at Magdeburg, the shipping canal at Minden, aircraft factories at Oschersleben and the industrial area of Saarbrücken.

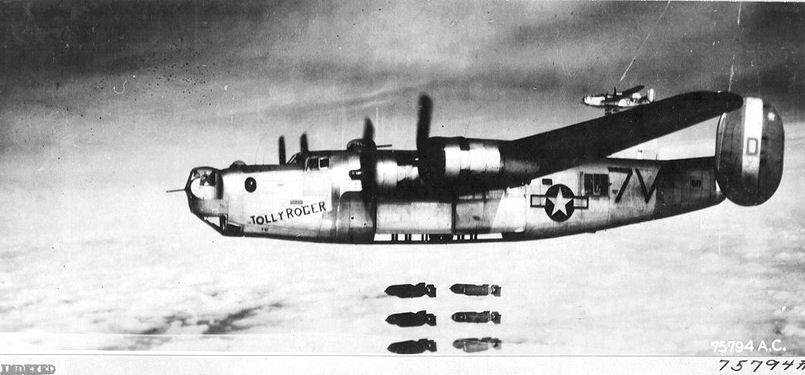
A 458th Group B-24J Liberator on the bomb run over Bielefeld, Germany on 24 February 1945 (Note: Aircraft is Consolidated B-24J-165-CO Liberator, serial 44-40475 "Jolly Roger". Taken on 24 February 1945.)

The group was occasionally diverted from the strategic bombing campaign to conduct air interdiction and close air support missions. It helped prepare for Operation Overlord, the invasion of Normandy, by striking artillery batteries, V-1 flying bomb and V-2 rocket launching sites, and airfields in France. On D-Day, it attacked coastal defenses to support the amphibious landings. Afterward, it attacked lines of communication to prevent the movement of enemy personnel and materiel from reaching the battlefield. It attacked enemy troops during Operation Cobra, the breakout from the beachhead through Saint Lo in late July.

It flew support missions during the Battle of the Bulge in December 1944 and January 1945 and during Operation Varsity, the airborne attacks across the Rhine in April 1945. The group stopped its bombing in September 1944, to transport gasoline to airfields in France to supply the Third Army, which had outrun its supply lines, called Operation Truckin'. Although the group flew more than 450 Truckin' sorties to advanced landing grounds in France and lost two aircraft, these were not considered combat missions. The group flew its last combat mission on 24 April 1945. The group flew 240 combat missions, claiming the destruction of 28 enemy aircraft, while losing 47 Liberators.

The group had the distinction of being the test squadron for the Army Air Forces' first guided bomb project. In May 1944, ten modified B-24s capable of launching Azon bombs were delivered to the 458th Group. On 31 May 1944, the group conducted a raid against several bridges in Normandy.

==== Return and inactivation ====
In May 1945, the group flew 105 "Trolley" missions. These missions transported ground personnel of the group over target areas on the continent to permit them to see the results of their contributions to the group mission. The group returned to the United States in June 1945, with aircraft beginning to depart for Bradley Field, Connecticut on 14 June. The ground echelon sailed on the RMS Queen Mary on 6 July. The group assembled at Sioux Falls Army Air Field, South Dakota in July. At Sioux Falls, all personnel who had not been discharged were transferred to other units.

The group reformed at Walker Army Air Field, Kansas. It moved to March Field, California in August, once it had achieved 20% manning. At March Field, it trained with the Boeing B-29 Superfortress very heavy bomber, but never approached 60% of its manning. It was inactivated there in October 1945.

=== Air Mobility Command air refueling ===
In 1992, Strategic Air Command was inactivated. Its bomber and reconnaissance mission was transferred to Air Combat Command (ACC). Barksdale Air Force Base, Louisiana became an ACC base. Its air refueling squadrons were transferred to Air Mobility Command (AMC). AMC activated the unit on 1 June 1992 as the 458th Operations Group, to control its two McDonnell Douglas KC-10 Extender tanker squadrons at Barksdale. The group was assigned to the 22d Air Refueling Wing at McConnell Air Force Base, Kansas. From 1 October 1993 until it was inactivated on 1 April 1994, the 71st Air Refueling Squadron, flying Boeing KC-135 Stratotankers was briefly assigned to the group. While assigned to the group, these squadrons frequently deployed personnel and aircraft worldwide.

In October 1994, the group and its 2d and 32d Air Refueling Squadrons moved to McGuire Air Force Base, New Jersey. The group was inactivated on 1 July 1995. It's KC-10s were reassigned to the 305th Operations Group, when Air Mobility Command consolidated its tanker force.

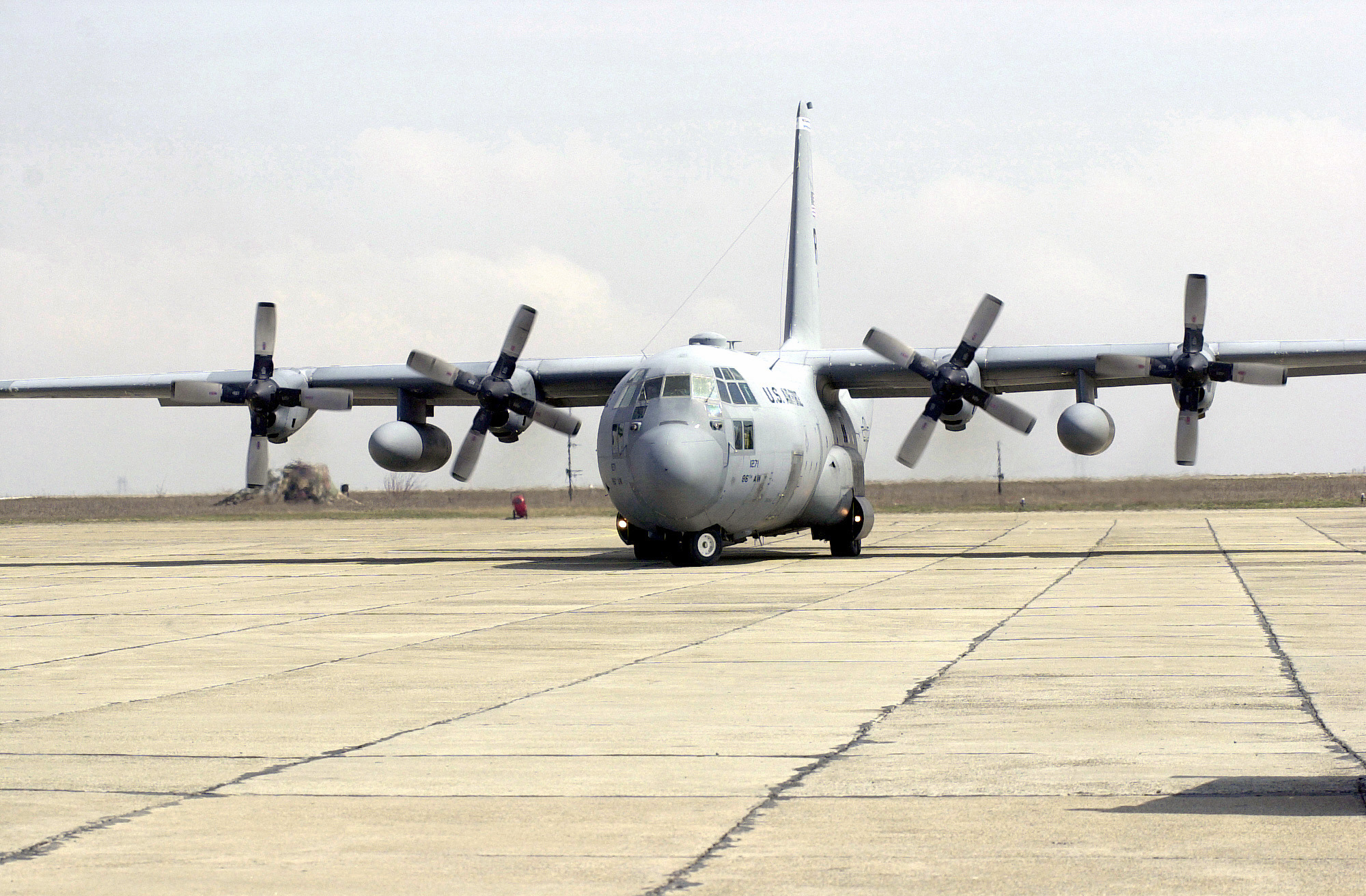
A C-130 Hercules assigned to the 458th Air Expeditionary Group taxis onto the parking ramp at Mihail Kogălniceanu Air Base

=== United States Air Forces in Europe expeditionary operations ===
The unit was converted to provisional status in February 2001 and assigned to United States Air Forces in Europe. In September 2002 the group deployed to Air Force Base Waterkloof, South Africa to participate in the first bilateral exercise between the air forces of South Africa and the United States. More than 200 airmen from Royal Air Force Mildenhall and RAF Lakenheath in England, Ellsworth Air Force Base, S.D., and the Oklahoma Air National Guard participated in the exercise.

In 2003, the group was again brought briefly to life, when it was active at Mihail Kogălniceanu International Airport, 26 km northwest of Constanța, Romania. The group was active from about March to June 2003, charged with maintaining an airbridge at the base to transport supplies and people to the United States Central Command area of responsibility at the beginning of the U.S. Iraq War - Operation Iraqi Freedom, and the Afghanistan War - Operation Enduring Freedom.

== Lineage ==
- Constituted as the 458th Bombardment Group (Heavy) on 19 May 1943, activated on 1 July 1943
- Redesignated 458th Bombardment Group, Heavy on 16 August 1944
- Redesignated 458th Bombardment Group, Very Heavy 5 August 1945, inactivated on 17 October 1945
- Redesignated 458th Operations Group on 1 July 1992 and activated. Inactivated on 1 July 1995
- Redesignated as 458th Air Expeditionary Group and converted to provisional status on 5 February 2001

Activated on 27 May 2004, Inactivated on 11 June 2004
Activated on 5 May 2006, Inactivated on 6 June 2006
Activated on 3 September 2006, Inactivated on 20 September 2006
Activated on 26 July 2007, Inactivated on 20 September 2007
Activated on 11 October 2007, Inactivated on 13 November 2007
Activated on 26 November 2007, Inactivated on 25 July 2011

=== Assignments ===
- Second Air Force, 1 July 1943
- Eighth Air Force, 28 January 1944
- 2d Bombardment Division, 8 February 1944
- Second Air Force, 12 July 1944 – 17 October 1945
- 22d Air Refueling Wing, 1 June 1992 – 1 July 1995
- United States Air Forces in Europe to activate or inactivate at any time after 5 February 2001

3d Air and Space Expeditionary Task Force, 27 May 2004 – 11 June 2004
Attached to Air Command, Europe, 5 May 2006 – 6 June 2006
Attached to Air Command, Europe, 3 September 2006 – 20 September 2006
Attached to Third Air Force, 26 July 2007 – 20 September 2007
Attached to Third Air Force, 11 October 2007 – 13 November 2007
Attached to Third Air Force, 26 November 2007 - 25 July 2011

=== Components ===
- 458th Bombardment Group
  - 752d Bombardment Squadron, 1 July 1943 – 17 October 1945
  - 753d Bombardment Squadron, 1 July 1943 – 17 October 1945
  - 754th Bombardment Squadron, 1 July 1943 – 17 October 1945
  - 755th Bombardment Squadron, 1 July 1943 – 17 October 1945
- 458th Operations Group
  - 2d Air Refueling Squadron, 1 June 1992 – 1 July 1995
  - 32d Air Refueling Squadron, 1 June 1992 – 1 July 1995
  - 458th Operations Support Squadron, 1 June 1992 – 1 July 1995
  - 71st Air Refueling Squadron, 1 October 1993 – 1 April 1994
- 458th Air Expeditionary Group
  - 37th Expeditionary Airlift Squadron, 27 May 2004 – 11 June 2004
  - 81st Expeditionary Fighter Squadron, 27 May 2004 – 11 June 2004
  - 86th Expeditionary Air Mobility Squadron, 27 May 2004 – 11 June 2004
  - 492d Expeditionary Fighter Squadron, 27 May 2004 – 11 June 2004
  - 494th Expeditionary Fighter Squadron, 27 May 2004 – 11 June 2004
  - 435th Expeditionary Medical Operations Squadron, 3 September 2006 – 20 September 2006
  - 786th Air Expeditionary Squadron, 3 September 2006 – 20 September 2006
  - 788th Air Expeditionary Squadron, 26 July 2007 – 20 September 2007; 11 October 2007 - 13 November 2007; 26 November 2007 – 25 July 2011

Istres Air Base, France

- 789th Air Expeditionary Squadron, 11 October 2007 – 13 November 2007; 26 November 2007 - 25 July 2011

Zaragoza Air Base, Spain

=== Stations ===
- Wendover Field, Utah 1 July 1943
- Gowen Field, Idaho, 28 July 1943
- Kearns Army Air Base, Utah, 11 September 1943
- Wendover Field, Utah, 15 September 1943
- Tonopah Army Air Field, Nevada, 31 October to 29 December 1943
- RAF Horsham St. Faith (Station 123), England, January 1944 to 14 June 1945
- Sioux Falls Army Air Field, South Dakota, 12 July 1945
- Walker Army Air Field, Kansas, 25 July 1945
- March Field, California, 21 August – 17 October 1945.
- Barksdale Air Force Base, Louisiana, 1 June 1992
- McGuire Air Force Base, New Jersey, 1 October 1994 – 1 July 1995
- Cherbourg – Maupertus Airport, France, 27 May 2004 – 11 June 2004
- Goulmima, Morocco, 5 May 2006 – 6 June 2006
- Kaduna, Nigeria, 3 September 2006 – 20 September 2006
- Ramstein Air Base, Germany, 26 July 2007 – 20 September 2007
- Ramstein Air Base, Germany, 11 October 2007 – 13 November 2007
- Ramstein Air Base, Germany, 26 November 2007 - 25 July 2011

=== Aircraft ===
- Consolidated B-24 Liberator, 1943–1945
- Boeing B-29 Superfortress, 1945
- McDonnell Douglas KC-10 Extender, 1992–1995
- Boeing C-17 Globemaster III and Lockheed C-130 Hercules, 2003

=== Awards and campaigns ===
Award streamer	Award	Dates	Notes
	Air Force Outstanding Unit Award	1 June 1992-30 June 1993	458th Operations Group
	Air Force Outstanding Unit Award	1 July 1994-1 July 1995	458th Operations Group

Campaign Streamer	Campaign	Dates	Notes
	Air Offensive, Europe	1 February 1944 – 5 June 1944	458th Bombardment Group
	Air Combat, EAME Theater	1 February 1944 – 11 May 1945	458th Bombardment Group
	Normandy	6 June 1944 – 24 July 1944	458th Bombardment Group
	Northern France	25 July 1944 – 14 September 1944	458th Bombardment Group
	Rhineland	15 September 1944 – 21 March 1945	458th Bombardment Group
	Ardennes-Alsace	16 December 1944 – 25 January 1945	458th Bombardment Group
	Central Europe	22 March 1944 – 21 May 1945	458th Bombardment Group

== See also ==
- B-24 Liberator units of the United States Army Air Forces
