= SS Sea Star =

SS Sea Star may refer to one of two Type C3 ships built for the United States Maritime Commission:

- SS Sea Star (1939) (MC hull no. 52, Type C3), built by Moore Dry Dock; acquired by the United States Navy and converted to troop transport USS Elizabeth C. Stanton (AP-69); sold for commercial use in 1946; scrapped in 1967
- SS Sea Star (1943) (MC hull no. 429, Type C3-S-A2), built by Ingalls Shipbuilding; sold for commercial use in 1946; scrapped in 1973
