= SS Brown Victory =

Victory ship of the United States

- Typical Victory Ship.

History

United States
- Name: Brown Victory
- Namesake: Brown University
- Owner: War Shipping Administration (WSA)
- Operator: Alaska Packers' Association
- Builder: Oregon Shipbuilding Company Portland
- Laid down: 12 January 1945
- Launched: 23 February 1945
- Completed: 27 March 1945

History

United States
- Name: Mormacpine
- Owner: Moore-McCormack Lines, Inc.
- In service: 1947
- Out of service: 1970
- Fate: Scrapped in Taiwan 1970

General characteristics
- Class & type: VC2-S-AP3 Victory ship
- Tonnage: 7612 GRT, 4,553 NRT
- Displacement: 15,200 tons
- Length: 455 ft (139 m)
- Beam: 62 ft (19 m)
- Draft: 28 ft (8.5 m)
- Installed power: 8,500 shp (6,300 kW)
- Propulsion: HP & LP turbines geared to a single 20.5-foot (6.2 m) propeller
- Speed: 16.5 knots
- Boats & landing craft carried: 4 Lifeboats
- Complement: 62 Merchant Marine and 28 US Naval Armed Guards
- Armament: 1 × 5 inch (127 mm)/38 caliber gun; 1 × 3 inch (76 mm)/50 caliber gun; 8 × 20 mm Oerlikon

Brown Victory was a Maritime Commission type VC2-S-AP2 Victory ship built during World War II under the Emergency Shipbuilding program. The ship was built by Oregon Shipbuilding Company Portland as Maritime Commission hull 171, yard number 1225. Her keel was laid on 25 February 1945. She was named for Brown University and christened on 2 May 1945. The ship was completed and delivered to the War Shipping Administration (WSA) with operation under WSA agreement by the Alaska Packers' Association on 27 March 1945. That agreement remained in effect until 2 July 1946.

Victory ships were designed to replace the earlier Liberty Ships. Liberty ships were designed to be used just for WW2. Victory ships were designed to last longer and serve the US Navy after the war. The Victory ship differed from a Liberty ship in that they were: faster, longer and wider, taller, a thinner stack set farther toward the superstructure and had a long raised forecastle.

== World War II ==
Brown Victory served in the Pacific War during World War II. Brown Victory took supplies to the Battle of Okinawa operations that lasted from 1 April until 22 June 1945.

=== Kamikaze attack ===
On 28 May 1945, at Iejima, near Okinawa, Ryukyu Islands a kamikaze plane hit Brown Victory. Tekesta and Spectacle under tow by Tekesta shot down the kamikaze plane, but the plane hit Brown Victory on its way down in the attack. Two of the 27 United States Navy Armed Guards were killed instantly in the attack. In the attack 18 crew members were injured. One of the merchant crew, Donald Lamont, 18, from Ahsahka, Idaho, and one of the Armed Guards died of their wounds later. The Navy tug Tekesta came to the aid of Brown Victory, helping the crew put out the fire and gave medical aid to the wounded. Brown Victory was damaged, but managed to survive the attack and was able to take her cargo to Saipan before steaming home to Oregon for repairs.

=== Honors ===
Brown Victory was awarded Battle Stars for the assault and occupation of Okinawa from 19 May 1945 to 6 June 1945. She used her deck guns to defend herself and other ships from attacks.

== Post War - Mormacpine ==
Brown Victory operation was changed to a bareboat charter to American Export Lines on 2 July 1946, then to bareboat charter to Moore-McCormack Lines, Inc., of New York, New York, on 21 November. On 17 April 1947, Moore-McCormack, purchased the ship with the name changed to Mormacpine.

Mormacpine made a few trips to help with the Korean War between 17 September and 2 August 1953. While departing San Pedro on 27 September 1959, in foggy conditions, the bow of Mormacpine rammed the boat Jane off the coast of Cape Flattery. Jane, a 49-foot wood fishing boat, was hit on her port side at about 3 or 4 knots and sank in about 3 minutes with the loss of two of her five crew members. It was ruled that the cause was twofold, Mormacpine was going too fast for the fog and Jane had no forward lookouts at the time of the crash. The fog limited visibility to 500 to 1,000 yards. Jane did not show up on Mormacpine radar due to her small size and wood hull. Mormacpine crew spotted Jane 1,000 yards off her starboard bow and put her engines into full reverse that slowed her to about 3 to 4 knots. No fines were made due to the accident.

On 28 March 1964, one of Mormacpine's holds caught fire. She was steaming from Salvador, Bahia, Brazil to New York City, New York with a load of sisal fibre and cocoa beans. A Coast Guard plane saw the fire from the air and depatched the Coast Guard cutter Half Moon to help. With no engines, she was towed to St. George's, Bermuda and arrived after midnight. None of the 47 crew members were harmed due to the fire. In St. George's harbor her cargo hold fire was put out.

In June 1970, the ship ceased operation and was scrapped at Kaoshung, Taiwan shortly after.

== See also ==
- List of Victory ships
- Liberty ship
- Type C1 ship
- Type C2 ship
- Type C3 ship
