= Robert C. Lee =

Robert Corwin Lee (August 30, 1888 – September 1, 1971) was Vice President of the Moore-McCormack Lines, Inc.'s, shipping company, and an officer of the US Navy achieving the rank of Rear Admiral (lower half) in the US Naval Reserve.

== Family ==
On June 15, 1918, he married Elsie Francis Calder, daughter of Senator William M. Calder.

== Navy ==
Lee was promoted to the rank of Commander before leaving full-time service. Later, he was promoted to Rear Admiral (lower half) (Commodore) in the US Naval Reserve, as a result of service during World War II.

== Shipping ==
Lee was instrumental in negotiating several significant contracts for Moore-McCormack in the 1920s, with Poland and Russia.

Both his wife and daughter, Kay Calder Lee, were "sponsors" (launching ladies) for several ships:

- USS Rocky Mount (AGC-3)
- HMS Biter (D97)

== Publications ==
- Mr. Moore, Mr. McCormack—and the seven seas! (New York: Newcomen Society in North America), transcript of 1956 Newcomen address(?), 32 pp. OCLC 921995
