= USS Tekesta (AT-93) =

Tugboat of the United States Navy

History

United States
- Name: USS Tekesta
- Namesake: Tekesta
- Builder: Commercial Iron Works, Portland, Oregon
- Laid down: 7 September 1942
- Launched: 20 March 1943
- Commissioned: 16 August 1943
- Decommissioned: 14 April 1950
- Reclassified: ATF-93, 16 May 1944
- Stricken: 25 June 1992
- Honors and awards: 4 battle stars (World War II)
- Fate: Transferred (leased) to Chile, May 1960

History

Chile
- Name: Yelcho (AGS-64)
- Acquired: May 1960
- Decommissioned: 16 August 1996
- Fate: Sunk as a target 5 July 1999

General characteristics
- Class & type: Navajo-class fleet tug
- Displacement: 1,235 long tons (1,255 t) light; 1,674 long tons (1,701 t) full
- Length: 205 ft (62 m)
- Beam: 38 ft 6 in (11.73 m)
- Draft: 15 ft 4 in (4.67 m)
- Propulsion: Diesel-electric; 4 × General Motors 12-278A diesel main engines driving 4 × General Electric generators and 3 × General Motors 3-268A auxiliary services engines; 1 screw; 3,600 shp (2,685 kW)
- Speed: 16.5 knots (30.6 km/h; 19.0 mph)
- Complement: 85
- Armament: 1 × 3 in (76 mm) gun; 2 × twin 40 mm gun mounts; 2 × single 20 mm guns

USS Tekesta (AT-93) was a Navajo-class fleet tug built during World War II for the United States Navy. Shortly after being built, it was crewed by trained Navy personnel and sent into the Pacific Ocean to provide tug service to damaged ships in battle areas. For successfully performing this dangerous work, the Navy awarded her four battle stars by the war's end.

She was laid down at Portland, Oregon, on 7 September 1942 by the Commercial Iron Works; launched on 20 March 1943; sponsored by Mrs. P. S. Treiber; and commissioned on 16 August 1943.

== Transfer to the Pacific Theater of operations ==
Tekesta operated on the west coast until mid-December and departed from San Francisco, California, on the 15th, bound for Hawaii. She reached Pearl Harbor on Christmas Eve 1943 and towed targets in Hawaiian waters until 20 January 1944. On that date, she joined Task Force (TF) 52, the Southern Attack Force of the Joint Expeditionary Force then preparing for Operation Flintlock, the assault on the Marshall Islands.

== Marshall Islands operations ==
Tekesta reached Kwajalein Atoll on 1 February and remained in the Marshalls-Gilberts area for the next two months, retracting beached and broached landing craft, laying marker buoys, assisting fueling operations, and performing other salvage and towing operations necessary in the aftermath of the occupation of the Marshall Islands. During this tour of duty, the tug visited Tarawa in the Gilbert Islands and Nanumea in the Ellice Islands as well as Kwajalein, Eniwetok, and Majuro in the Marshalls.

On 12 April, the tug departed Majuro to return to Hawaii and reached Pearl Harbor a week later. There, she performed miscellaneous towing, rescue, and salvage duties until 10 May, when she got underway for Majuro with three barges in tow. En route, her designation was changed to ATF-93 on the 15th. On the 26th, Tekesta reached her destination and delivered her charges. She continued westward on 1 June, arriving in Eniwetok lagoon on the 3rd. There, she joined TF 52 to prepare for the invasion of the Marianas. On the 11th, she sortied with that task organization bound for its first objective, Saipan.

The tug arrived off Saipan on D-day, 15 June. The following day, she helped to fight off two enemy bombers which flew over her formation. She remained in the Marianas until late July, towing pontoon bridges to the beaches, retracting landing craft, and assisting in repairs and salvage operations. By the time she departed Saipan, that island had been declared secure, but the struggles for Tinian and Guam continued. On 26 July, Tekesta headed for the Marshalls, arriving at Eniwetok on the 29th. Following four days turnaround time there, the tug made a round-trip voyage to Guam, returning to Eniwetok on 14 August. She remained at the atoll until the second week in September doing extensive salvage work with grounded craft and towing barges.

== Return to Pearl ==
Tekesta headed eastward on 9 September and entered Pearl Harbor once more a week later. After trials and salvage operations there, the tug got underway on 26 October, with Barite (IX-161) and YF-625 in tow, and proceeded via Eniwetok to Ulithi where she delivered her charges on 3 December. The tug then settled into a routine of towing and salvage operations which took her to Guam, Saipan, Ulithi, and the Palaus. Those operations, which lasted until March 1945, were broken only by one short period of operations with the fast carriers in mid-December.

== Invasion of the Philippines operations ==
On 1 March 1945, Tekesta cleared the Palau Islands for the Philippines and arrived in Leyte Gulf on 4 March to join TF 51, the Ryukyu invasion force. By D-day, 1 April, the tug was operating near Okinawa. For the next month and one-half, she was assigned to the anchorage at Kerama Retto. She towed kamikaze-damaged warships into Kerama Retto and assisted in their repairs. She also labored retracting and repairing beached and damaged landing craft. On 7 April, the tug towed Newcomb (DD-586) into the anchorage. On the 15th, her gunners helped to bring down a Japanese plane. She assisted Harding (DMS-28) into Kerama Retto on the following day. On 4 May, Tekesta towed Aaron Ward (DM-34) to repairs at Kerama Retto and, five days later, did the same for Oberrender (DE-344).

== Under constant attack by Japanese fighter planes ==
On 14 May, Tekesta took up station at Ie Shima and, for the following month, conducted rescue and salvage missions from that islet. She frequently fought off air attacks. On 25 May, while bringing Spectacle (AM-305) into Ie Shima, she fired on kamikazes. Three days later, she fired on a four-plane flight of Japanese aircraft. She hit one, but it managed to crash into SS Brown Victory. Tekesta immediately came to the aid of the stricken merchantman with fire-fighting crews and medical aid. On 10 June, the tug rushed to the aid of William D. Porter (DD-579), but only arrived in time to watch helplessly as the destroyer rolled over and slipped beneath the sea. Three days later, she returned to Kerama Retto and, the following day, departed the anchorage with Newcomb in tow for the Marianas.

== End-of-War operations ==
Tekesta remained in the Marianas four days before continuing on to Leyte. She arrived in Leyte Gulf on 4 August and was operating there with Service Squadron 10 when hostilities ceased on the 15th. On the 30th, she put to sea with the first echelon of the Korean Service Group. After stopping at Okinawa on 2 September, she reached Jinsen, Korea, on the 7th. For the next seven months, Tekesta operated with the occupation forces in Korea and northern China. During that time, she visited Hong Kong and Shanghai. On 9 April 1946, the tug exited Hong Kong harbor. She stopped in the Philippine Islands at Samar, from 13 April to 20 April; touched at Okinawa on the 23rd; and reached Sasebo, Japan, early in May. On the 11th, she returned to Shanghai. Later in the month, she visited Subic Bay before returning to China for three more months of duty.

On 23 August, the tug cleared Qingdao to return to the United States. After stops at Samar, Guam, Kwajalein, and Pearl Harbor, Tekesta entered port at San Francisco, California, on 12 November. For the following seven months, she was engaged in normal towing and salvage operations along the U.S. West Coast, ranging from San Francisco as far south as the Panama Canal. On 16 June 1947, she departed San Francisco and headed north. After stopovers at Bremerton and Seattle, Washington, she arrived at Kodiak, Alaska, for a year of duty in the Aleutians area. During that period, she called at Dutch Harbor, Fort Glenn, Attu, Adak, Amchitka, and various other ports of call in Alaska and along the Aleutians chain.

On 28 June 1948, Tekesta returned to San Francisco and resumed operations along the California coast until early November. On the 4th, she headed west once more. She called at Pearl Harbor and Midway Island before reaching Yokosuka, Japan, on the 30th. In January, she shifted to Qingdao, and operated there until early in March. Tekesta departed China on 10 March, visited Okinawa from the 14th to the 18th, and returned to Qingdao on the 21st. She reentered Yokosuka on 7 April and operated from that port for two months before beginning her return voyage to the United States. Stopping at Wake Island and Pearl Harbor along the way, the tug put into San Francisco on 24 July 1949.

Operating from her base at Long Beach, California, Tekesta made four voyages to the Panama Canal Zone between July 1949 and April 1950. She also carried passengers to nearby ports. She entered Mare Island Naval Shipyard on 4 April 1950 for inactivation. Six days later, she was towed to San Diego, California. There, she was placed out of commission on the 14th and berthed with the San Diego Group, Pacific Reserve Fleet.

== Decommissioning ==
She remained inactive until 24 January 1958, when she was placed in service. She operated under control of the Commandant, 11th Naval District, until 2 July when she was reassigned to the 12th Naval District and based at San Francisco. In August 1959, Tekesta resumed duty at San Diego. She was placed out of service early in 1960 and, in May, was transferred to the government of Chile under lease, where she continued to serve Chile as Yelcho (AGS 64) until decommissioned on 16 August 1996. Yelcho was sunk as a target on 5 July 1999.

== Awards ==
Tekesta (ATF-93) earned four battle stars during World War II:

- Marshall Islands operation (Occupation of Kwajalein and Majuro Atolls, 1 February to 8 February 1944).
- Marianas operation (Capture and occupation of Saipan, 15 June to 26 July 1944).
- Tinian capture and occupation (27 April to 20 July 1944).
- Okinawa Gunto operation (Assault and occupation of Okinawa Gunto, 1 April to 14 June 1945).
