= USS Lyon =

1940 type C3 U.S. Navy ship

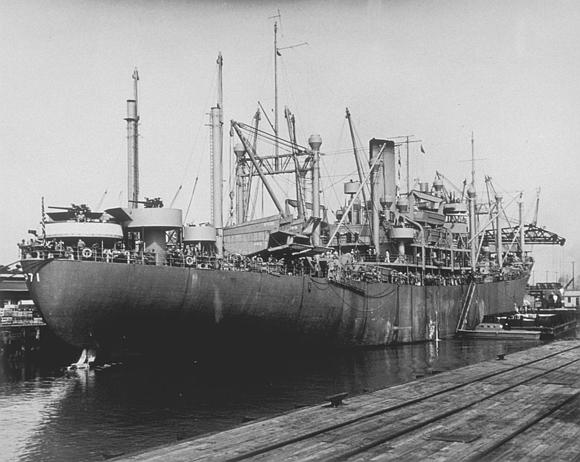

History

United States
- Name: Mormactide (1941–1942); Lyon (1942–1946); Mormactide (1946–1966); Santa Regina (1966–1972)
- Namesake: Mary Lyon (Navy)
- Builder: Ingalls Shipbuilding, Pascagoula, Mississippi
- Yard number: 255
- Laid down: 21 August 1939
- Launched: 12 October 1940, as Mormactide
- Acquired: Completed 10 April 1941; By War Shipping Administration 10 March 1942; By Navy 20 August 1942
- Commissioned: 13 September 1942
- Decommissioned: 3 May 1946
- Renamed: Lyon, 20 August 1942
- Honors and awards: 5 battle stars (World War II)
- Fate: Sold for scrapping 18 January 1972
- Notes: Official number: 240348

General characteristics
- Class & type: Maritime Commission type C3; Navy Elizabeth C. Stanton-class transport
- Displacement: 7,954 long tons (8,082 t)
- Length: 491 ft 8 in (149.86 m)
- Beam: 69 ft 6 in (21.18 m)
- Draft: 26 ft 6 in (8.08 m)
- Propulsion: Steam turbine, single shaft, 8,500 hp (6,338 kW)
- Speed: 18.4 knots (34.1 km/h; 21.2 mph)
- Complement: 429 officers and enlisted
- Armament: 4 × single 3"/50 caliber guns; 6 × 40 mm AA guns

USS Lyon (AP-71) was a type C3 ship of the United States Navy which played an extensive role in naval transportation during World War II. The Lyon was built as Mormactide under a Maritime Commission (MC) contract by the Ingalls Shipbuilding Company of Pascagoula, Mississippi. She was laid down 21 August 1939, and was launched on 12 October 1940; sponsored by Gloria McGehee.

Mormactide was the third ship to be built by Ingalls for Moore-McCormack Lines and was designed specifically for the South American trade. The ship was completed in April 1941 and turned over to the War Shipping Administration (WSA) for wartime operation in March 1942 when it was operated by Moore-McCormack for the WSA under a United States Army Transportation Corps agreement. In August the ship was transferred to the Custody of the War Department. On 20 August 1942 the ship was acquired by the Navy and was renamed the Lyon after Mary Lyon, the founder of Mount Holyoke College (then Mount Holyoke Female Seminary). (See also List of U.S. military vessels named after women.)

The Lyon was transferred for conversion to the Atlantic Basin Iron Works of Brooklyn, New York on 13 September 1942. The ship was commissioned on 16 September 1942. After the ship's service in World War II, the ship was decommissioned on 3 May 1946, and was returned to her owners, Moore-McCormack Lines. In 1966 the ship was acquired by Grace Lines and renamed the Santa Regina.

== Pre-World War II ==
Mormactide was the second ship designed for Moore-McCormack's South American trade equipped with a cargo air conditioning system and the third ship to be built by Ingalls for the line. The ship, a MC type C3 hull numbered 65, Ingalls hull 255 was assigned official number 240348 and completed on 10 April 1941. Mormactide was turned over to the War Shipping Administration (WSA) for wartime operation on 10 March 1942. Mormactide was operated by Moore-McCormack for WSA under a standard Army Transportation Corps agreement until 8 August 1942 when the ship was transferred to the Custody of the War Department. On 13 September 1942 the Navy acquired Mormactide under a bareboat charter from WSA.

== World War II ==
After being turned over to the Navy, she completed conversion to an AP, Elizabeth C. Stanton-class transport ship, on 20 September 1942. The Lyon departed from Newport News, Virginia on 22 October 1942 to assist in the invasion of French Morocco, taking part in the largest assembly of ships ever assembled at the time. The Lyon safely crossed the Atlantic Ocean, encountering none of the U-boats which were a major danger at the time. The ship arrived at Safi on 7 November.

While ships of the western task force of Operation Torch silenced French shore batteries and naval resistance, troops of the western pincer were landed to trap the retreating Afrika Korps of General Erwin Rommel, the "Desert Fox". Though a cease-fire was negotiated on 11 November, German U-boats interfered, and torpedo attacks began 10 November. Since the 15 transports and cargo ships anchored in Fedhala Roads offered a target, they were removed to the security of Casablanca. The Lyon was part of a convoy that sailed for the United States on 15 November, and arrived back in Norfolk on 24 November.

From 13 December 1942 to 11 March 1943, Lyon made two voyages between New York City and Oran, Algeria, transporting reinforcements for the campaign in North Africa. The ship was then ordered to duty with Atlantic Amphibious Force for several weeks, and returned to Africa on 23 May to participate in amphibious training exercises until 28 June.

Lyon next departed Mers el Kebir, Algiers on 6 July, with units of the Army's 1st Infantry Division for the assault on Gela, Sicily. The troops on the Lyon disembarked safely in stormy weather on 10 July for the initial advance into what had been called Europe's "soft underbelly". The vessel sailed from the battle area on 12 July and arrived back in Algeria three days later to prepare for the next assignment, the Salerno landings.

Operation Avalanche was launched on 9 September. The landings were successful despite heavy enemy fire, air attacks, and complications resulting from a false report of Italy's surrender. The Lyon returned to Oran on 14 September and for the next two months reinforced American forces fighting in the Naples area. The ship departed the Mediterranean Sea on 7 November and arrived in New York City on 21 November for overhaul.

In January 1944, the Lyon transported 2,000 Army Air Corps and Army Medical Corps personnel to Scotland, returning to New York City on 28 January. The Lyon then departed for North Africa via England, making two voyages to Naples before beginning five months of training.

She sailed from Naples on 13 August as part of a combined British-French-United States operation to land in the St. Tropez area of southern France. Lyon received her fourth battle star here where the Allied landings overwhelmed opposition at this "back door" to Europe. The ship continued to reinforce these landings until 24 October when she again departed for New York.

Arriving 8 November, she prepared for Pacific duty, and sailed from New York on 26 December. Lyon embarked combat forces in San Francisco in January 1945, and departed for the invasion of Okinawa.

Lyon successfully completed her role in this major attack in the face of kamikaze attacks, and returned to San Francisco on 21 May. She departed Seattle, Washington, on 2 June to reinforce Okinawa, sailing via Honolulu, Eniwetok, and Ulithi. Lyon arrived off Okinawa on 14 July and was immediately forced out to sea by a typhoon. For two days her convoy was exposed to enemy submarine and kamikaze attacks, but the proximity of Admiral William Halsey, Jr.'s 3rd Fleet diverted potential attackers. She returned to Okinawa on 21 July and embarked veteran marines bound for Guam to prepare for the planned assault on the Japanese home islands. She returned to the west coast on 14 August.

Lyon received five battle stars for World War II service.

== After World War II ==
After two voyages to the Far East between August and November transporting occupation troops and returning veterans, Lyon arrived in San Francisco on 3 February 1946. She departed Oakland, California, on 2 March with 1,000 German prisoners of war bound for Liverpool, England, and returned to New York on 12 April. She decommissioned on 3 May 1946 and was returned to her owners, the Moore-McCormack Lines, and her original name.

On 3 May 1946 the ship returned to operation by Moore-McCormack under a WSA agreement as Mormactide until 6 November when the ship was redelivered to the line. The ship remained under the ownership of Moore-McCormack Lines until August 1966 when she was sold to Grace Lines and renamed Santa Regina. On 18 January the ship was sold by the then Prudential-Grace Lines to Dah Young Steel Manufacturing Co., LTD for scrapping in Taiwan.

== Appearances in media ==
- A Freighter in Port
