= USS Anne Arundel =

American transport ship

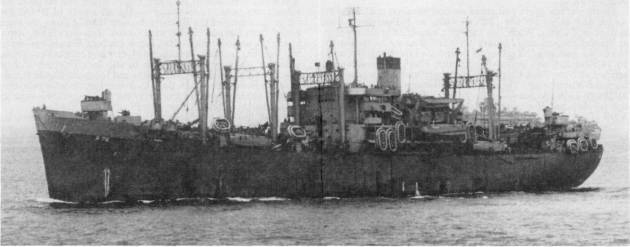
- USS Anne Arundel

History

United States
- Name: Anne Arundel
- Namesake: Anne Arundel County, Maryland
- Builder: Federal Shipbuilding and Drydock Company, Kearny, New Jersey
- Laid down: 18 July 1940
- Launched: 16 November 1940
- Acquired: 13 September 1942
- Commissioned: 17 September 1942
- Decommissioned: 21 March 1946
- Stricken: 12 April 1946
- Honors and awards: 5 battle stars (World War II)
- Fate: Returned to merchant service until 1962; Sold for scrap, 1970

General characteristics
- Class & type: Elizabeth C. Stanton-class transport
- Displacement: 14,400 long tons (14,631 t) full
- Length: 492 ft (150 m)
- Beam: 69 ft 6 in (21.18 m)
- Draft: 24 ft (7.3 m)
- Speed: 18.4 knots (34.1 km/h; 21.2 mph)
- Complement: 429
- Armament: 4 × 3-inch/50-caliber guns; 4 × 40 mm AA guns; 18 × 20 mm AA guns

USS Anne Arundel (AP-76) was an American transport ship that was built in 1940 and scrapped in 1970. Originally laid down as the Mormacyork, she was later named after Anne Arundel County, Maryland. Annapolis is the county seat there, the state capital, and also the home of the Naval Academy. Anne Arundel earned five battle stars for her World War II service.

== Operational history ==
=== Pre-World War II ===
Mormacyork was a type C3 ship laid down under a Maritime Commission contract (MC hull 43) on 18 July 1940 at Kearny, New Jersey, by the Federal Shipbuilding and Drydock Company. Launched on 16 November 1940; sponsored by Mrs. William T. Moore, she was owned and operated by Moore-McCormack Lines, Inc., and ran voyages from the east coast of the United States to South American and Mediterranean ports.

=== World War II ===
She was acquired by the Navy from the War Shipping Administration on 13 September 1942 and converted for naval service as a transport at Brooklyn, by the Robbins Shipbuilding & Drydock Co.; and commissioned on 17 September 1942, under Commander Lunsford Y. Mason Jr.

==== Operation Torch ====
The new transport was renamed Anne Arundel and designated AP-76. On 22 September, she proceeded to Norfolk, Virginia, to load cargo and ammunition and then held shakedown training in the Chesapeake Bay. On 23 October, she left the east coast to rendezvous with Task Group (TG) 34.8, which had been formed to invade French Morocco in Operation Torch. Anne Arundel arrived in the transport area off the Moroccan coast on 8 November and began discharging Army troops and supplies. This process continued until the 15th, when the ship moored at Casablanca. Unloading continued at dockside through the 17th, when she got underway in a convoy returning to the United States.

Upon arriving back at Norfolk on 2 December, the vessel was temporarily assigned to the Naval Transportation Service. The next day, she sailed to Brooklyn, N.Y., to undergo extensive alterations and repairs at the Atlantic Basin Iron Works. The yard work was completed in early January 1943, and the transport began taking on cargo and troops. On 14 January, she sailed with a convoy on the first of a series of three voyages to Oran, Algeria. In April, while engaged in this service, the ship reported for duty to Amphibious Forces, Atlantic Fleet.

==== Operation Husky ====
Instead of returning home from the last eastward transatlantic crossing which ended at Oran on 22 June, Anne Arundel got underway on 5 July to take part in Operation Husky – the Allied invasion of Sicily. On the 9th, the vessel anchored off Scoglitti, Sicily, with Transport Division 5 and, the next day, began debarkation operations. She completed unloading on the 13th and reversed her course back to Oran. She paused there to take on personnel for transportation to the United States and then sailed on the 22nd. The ship reached New York City on 3 August.

Following voyage repairs, the transport left the east coast on 21 August and headed back toward Algeria. She arrived at Oran on 2 September, unloaded her cargo, and returned to New York. Anne Arundel got underway again in early October and touched at Belfast, Northern Ireland, on the 17th before proceeding on to Gourock, Scotland, to discharge cargo. The vessel sailed on 27 October, shaped a course for Algeria, and remained in port at Algiers for one week before sailing for the United States. She reached New York on 11 December.

The transport began the year 1944 with a voyage to England. She touched at Liverpool on 9 January, debarked some troops, and moved on to Belfast the next day. The ship sent more troops and supplies ashore there before returning to the United States. She continued her supply runs between New York City and Great Britain through early June. Among her ports of call were Newport, Wales; Portland and Plymouth, England; and Loch Long, Firth of Clyde, Scotland. In mid-April, Anne Arundel arrived at Plymouth to begin rehearsals for the upcoming invasion of the European continent at Normandy.

==== Operations Neptune and Dragoon ====
On 5 June 1944, the ship left Portland with Task Force 124 and headed for the transport area off Omaha Beach in northern France as part of Operation Neptune. She began debarking troops at 0646 on "D-Day", 6 June, and completed the process later that day. The vessel then reversed her course, steamed to England, and moored at Portland on the 7th. Anne Arundel took on cargo at Avonmouth, England, later that month and got underway for Algeria on 3 July. She paused at Oran before sailing on to Naples, Italy. At that port, she took troops and supplies on board in preparation for the invasion of southern France, Operation Dragoon.

On 15 August, Anne Arundel arrived in the Baie de Pampelonne off the coast of Provence in France and began discharging troops ashore that same day. The transport left the area on the 16th and set a course for Oran. She returned to the French coast on 30 August and moored in the Baie de Cavalaire to unload vehicles and troops to reinforce Allied positions. During the next one and one-half months, the vessel made several resupply runs from Naples and Oran to Marseille, France. She completed her last trip to France on 15 October and set a course for the United States.

==== Pacific ====
Anne Arundel touched back at New York City on 8 November and entered a shipyard for repair work before resuming cargo loading operations. She left the east coast on 18 December, bound for the Pacific. The transport transited the Panama Canal on Christmas Day; joined the Pacific Fleet; and continued on to San Francisco, California, where she embarked several hundred marines. She then made another stop at San Diego, California, to take on supplies and naval passengers. The ship left the west coast on 14 January 1945 and reached Pearl Harbor, Hawaii, six days later.

The vessel got underway again on the 22 to carry supplies and troops to Guam and Ulithi. At Guam, she took on marine and naval casualties for transportation to Hawaii. After making a brief call at Eniwetok, Anne Arundel arrived back at Pearl Harbor on 22 March. The vessel was in upkeep for approximately one week before once more beginning cargo loading operations. She left Hawaii on 7 April with troops for the Ryukyu campaign embarked; made stops en route at Eniwetok and Ulithi before arriving in the transport area off Hagushi beach on Okinawa on 3 May. For the next five days, the ship debarked troops, provisioned various landing craft, and received casualties on board. She paused at Saipan on 12 May to send wounded troops to hospitals on the island and then continued sailing eastward to the United States.

The transport reached San Francisco on 28 May. After a period of upkeep, Anne Arundel began taking on equipment and supplies for transportation to forward areas in the Pacific. She arrived at Pearl Harbor on 18 June; then shaped a course for the Philippines. On 9 July, the ship reached Leyte, where she was assigned to duty as a receiving ship. She remained at Leyte until 8 August, the day she got underway for the Admiralty Islands. The ship was in port at Manus when the Japanese surrendered to the Allies on 15 August 1945.

Anne Arundel returned to Leyte on the 23rd. After taking on personnel and supplies, she left Philippine waters and headed for the Japanese home islands. She moored at Yokohama, Japan, on 13 September and reported for duty with Transport Squadron 24 to support occupation forces ashore. After unloading her holds, the ship left Japan on 19 September and sailed for Apra Harbor, Guam.

=== Post World War II ===
Having taken on another load of troops and cargo, Anne Arundel sailed to Qingdao, China. After discharging her passengers there, the ship proceeded to the Philippines. From Manila, she got underway on 30 October with TG 78.6, bound for French Indochina. Anne Arundel reached Hai Phong on 2 November and began embarking elements of the Chinese 52nd Army and their equipment for transportation back to China. She arrived at Chinwang'tao on the 12th. Having disembarked her passengers, the vessel left Chinese waters two days later and proceeded to Nagoya, Japan.

There, the transport embarked several hundred military personnel and sailed for the United States on 5 December. She arrived at Tacoma, Washington, on the 18th; remained in availability at Tacoma through late January 1946; and then got underway to sail to the east coast. The vessel retransited the Panama Canal on 14 February and joined the Atlantic Fleet. Anne Arundel arrived at New York City on 21 February and began preparations for deactivation. She was decommissioned at Brooklyn on 21 March 1946 and turned over the War Shipping Administration for disposal. Her name was struck from the Navy List on 12 April 1946.

Returned to her prewar owners and refurbished for merchant service, the ship operated as Mormacyork until laid up around 1962. She remained on contemporary merchant vessel registers, inactive, until she was sold to the Lotti S.p.A., of Italy, on 1 July 1970, and broken up for scrap.

== See also ==
- List of U.S. military vessels named after women
