= USS Elizabeth C. Stanton =

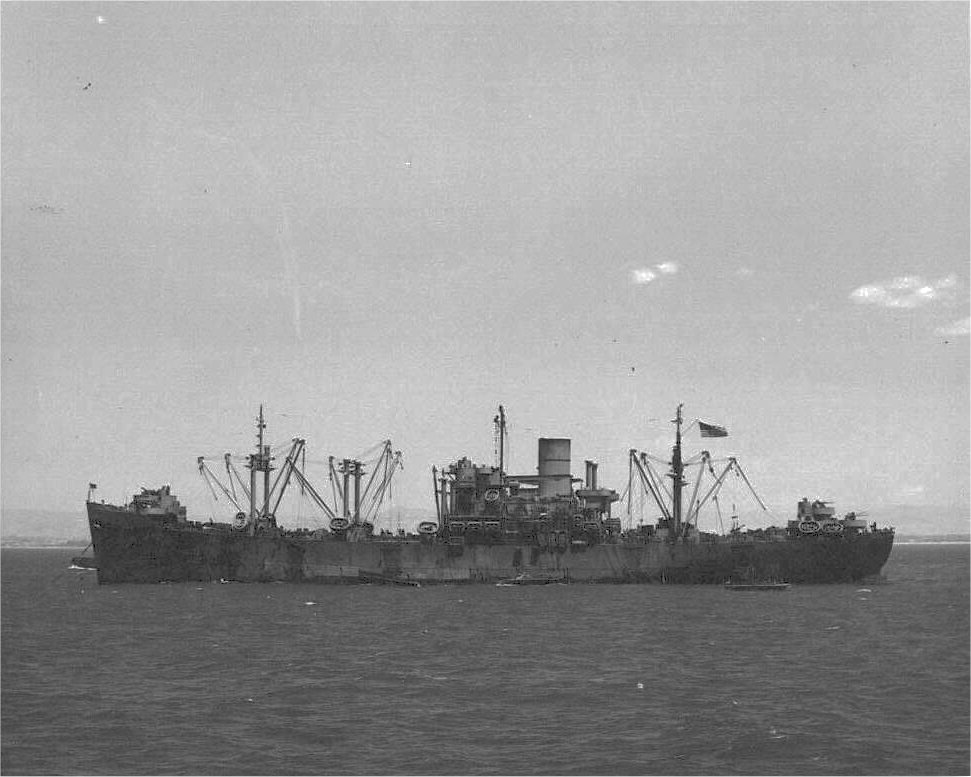
- Elizabeth C. Stanton

History

United States
- Name: Sea Star (1939-1940); Mormacstar (1940-1942); Elizabeth C. Stanton (1942-1946); Mormacstar (1946-1961); Jacqueline Someck (1961-1964); National Seafarer (1964-1947)
- Namesake: Elizabeth Cady Stanton
- Builder: Moore Dry Dock Company, Oakland, California
- Launched: 22 December 1939, as Sea Star
- Acquired: 13 September 1942
- Commissioned: 17 September 1942
- Decommissioned: 3 April 1946
- Honors and awards: 5 battle stars (World War II)
- Fate: Sold by the Maritime Commission for commercial service, 1946; Scrapped in 1967

General characteristics
- Class & type: Elizabeth C. Stanton-class transport
- Displacement: 7,980 long tons (8,108 t) light; 14,909 long tons (15,148 t) full
- Length: 492 ft (150 m)
- Beam: 69 ft 6 in (21.18 m)
- Draft: 28 ft 6 in (8.69 m)
- Propulsion: Steam turbine, single shaft, 8,500 hp (6,338 kW)
- Speed: 18 knots (33 km/h; 21 mph)
- Complement: 429 officers and enlisted
- Armament: 1 × single 5"/38 caliber gun; 4 × single 3"/50 caliber guns

USS Elizabeth C. Stanton (AP-69) was the lead ship of her class of Second World War United States Navy transport ships, named for the suffragist and abolitionist Elizabeth Cady Stanton.

Elizabeth C. Stanton was launched on 22 December 1939 as Sea Star by Moore Dry Dock Company, Oakland, California, for Moore-McCormack Lines, Inc., under a Maritime Commission contract; sponsored by Mrs. Richard J. Welch; renamed Mormacstar in 1940; transferred to the Navy on 13 September 1942; and commissioned on 17 September 1942.

== Service history ==
Coverage of the Sea Star launching, sponsored by Congressman Richard J. Welch and his wife, in the Pacific Marine Review, January 1940

Sailing from Norfolk on 24 October 1942, Elizabeth C. Stanton quickly landed her troops and equipment for the assault on North Africa on 8 November and got underway for the States within the week. After another rapid voyage to North Africa to support the troops fighting ashore, she returned to Norfolk on 24 April 1943 and the following day became flagship for amphibious exercises in Chesapeake Bay.

On 10 May 1943 Elizabeth C. Stanton sailed again for the Mediterranean, where she saw action during the invasion of Sicily on 10 July. She remained off the island discharging troops and combat cargo, and fighting off enemy aircraft for six days. She returned to Algeria to prepare for the next operation, and on 9 September landed her troops at Salerno in the initial assault. Until the end of October, she carried reinforcement troops from Bizerte and Oran to Naples for the capture and occupation of Italy, then sailed for New York and overhaul.

When Elizabeth C. Stanton returned to transport duty in January 1944, preparations were underway for the June invasion of Normandy; she made two voyages to carry troops and cargo for the huge buildup in the British Isles. On 14 March 1944 she departed Belfast for Algeria, and subsequently carried troops to Naples, taking part in amphibious exercises and antisubmarine patrols until August. Then she saw action in the initial landings on the coast of southern France. She continued to support this operation by transporting troops and cargo throughout the Mediterranean until returning to the United States on 8 November.

After overhaul at New York, Elizabeth C. Stanton sailed for the Pacific on 4 January 1945, and arrived at Espiritu Santo on 23 February. Assigned to redeploy troops in the central and southern Pacific, she sailed from Pearl Harbor to the New Hebrides, Marianas, Marshalls, Solomons, Carolines and Okinawa Gunto. Arriving at San Francisco on 11 July for repairs, she sailed again in August to transport troops for the occupation of Japan. She returned to the West Coast late in 1945. On 20 January 1946 she carried 1,800 German prisoners of war with their US Army guards from Long Beach to Liverpool and Le Havre. She returned to New York on 5 March and was decommissioned on 3 April 1946, ownership reverting to the Maritime Commission on the same day.

Elizabeth C. Stanton received five battle stars for World War II service.

== Return to commerce ==
On 24 August 1946 the ship was returned to Moore McCormack Lines for operation until sold to Peninsular Navigation Co. on 14 February 1961 to be renamed Jacqueline Someck. The ship was sold back to Moore McCormack on 18 December 1963 to be sold again on 28 February 1964 to Windward Steamship Co. to be renamed National Seafarer. The ship was sold to interest in Japan and scrapped September 1967.

== See also ==
- List of U.S. military vessels named after women
