= Elizabeth C. Stanton-class transport =

Ship

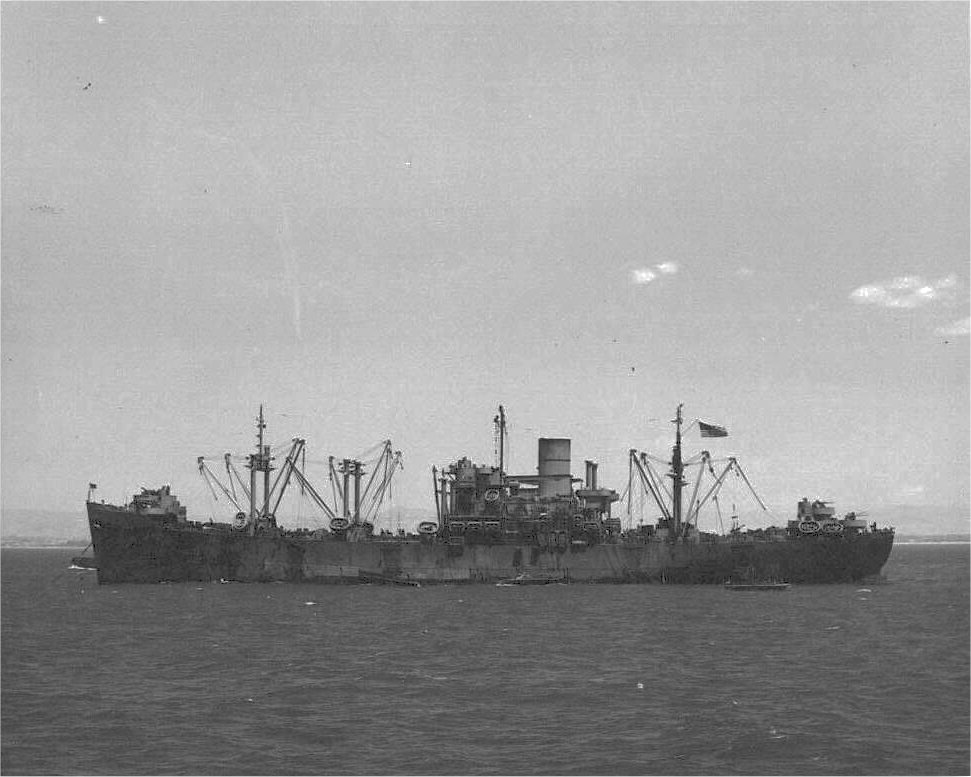
- USS Elizabeth C. Stanton, lead ship of the class

Class overview
- Operators: United States Navy

General characteristics
- Type: Transport ship
- Displacement: 7,980 long tons (8,108 t) light; 14,909 long tons (15,148 t) full
- Length: 492 ft (150 m)
- Beam: 69 ft 6 in (21.18 m)
- Draft: 24 ft (7.3 m)
- Propulsion: Steam turbine, single shaft, 8,500 hp (6,338 kW)
- Speed: 18 knots (33 km/h; 21 mph)
- Complement: 396
- Armament: 1 × single 5"/38 caliber gun; 4 × single 3"/50 caliber guns

The Elizabeth C. Stanton class transport ship was a transport class of the United States Navy that originated just prior to the second World War. The class, which contained only four ships, is named for Elizabeth Cady Stanton. All of the vessels were named for important women in history, including: USS Elizabeth C. Stanton (AP-69); USS Florence Nightingale (AP-70); USS Mary Lyon (AP-71); and USS Anne Arundel (AP-76).

The Elizabeth C. Stanton transport ship USS Anne Arundel was used to transport troops in the D-Day actions.

== See also ==
- List of U.S. military vessels named after women
