= Kearns Army Air Base =

U. S. Army Air Base

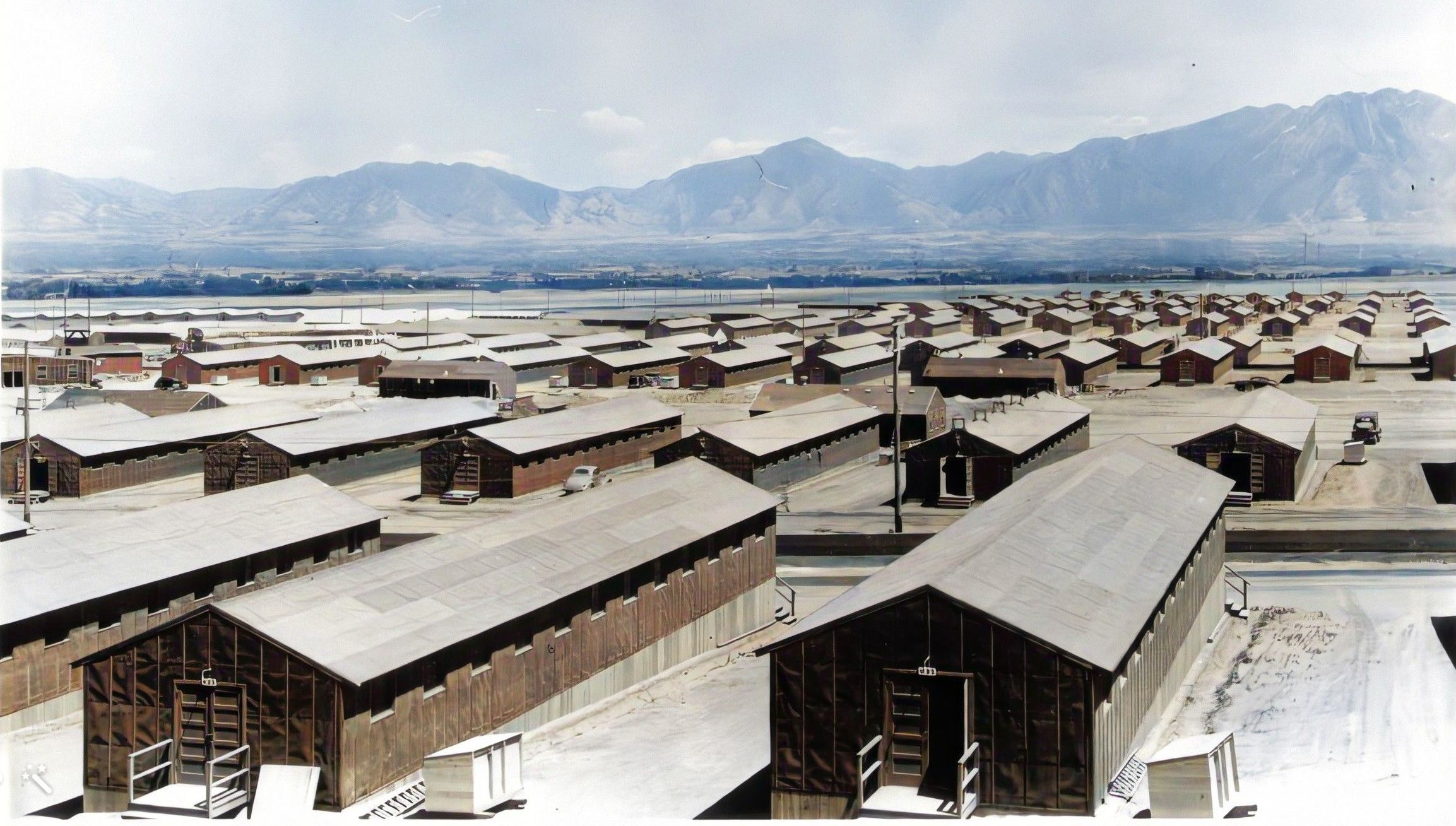
- Army Barracks, looking E-NE
- IATA: none; ICAO: none

Summary

Kearns Army Air Base was a U.S. Army Air Base seven miles (11 km) southwest of Salt Lake City, Utah. It served in many roles. Despite being referred to as air base, it had no runways and no airplanes could land near there. It was not associated with Salt Lake City Municipal Airport No. 2 (now South Valley Regional Airport), which bordered Kearns to the south, which was a small general aviation airport.

At right is an Area Map of Kearns dated 6/25/43 when it was a technical training center. On the west side is a railroad spur to the base. There are six E-W roads, which from N to S are Avenues F to A, at 4715 S, 4865, 5015 (150 between these three, 200 between the next), 5215. 5415 and 5615 S. The N-S roads, E to W, are 1st Street at 4020 W (next to now 4015) to 9th Street at 4820 W (100 between each of these).

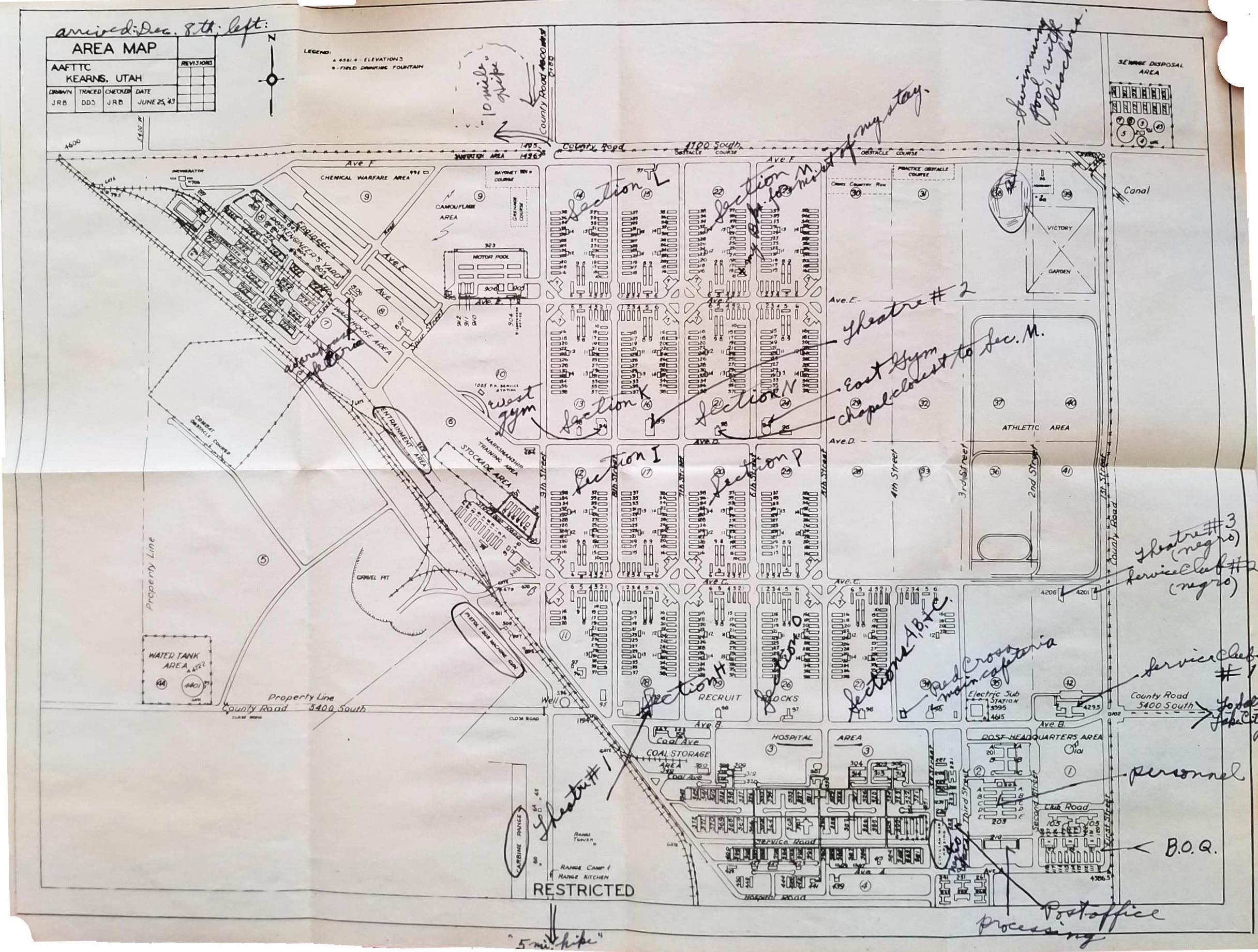
A Kearns Army Air Base Street Map

== History ==
On 10 February 1942, the United States district engineer (Colonel E. G. Thomas) recommended a "5,450-acre dry farming area in Kearns" for an inland Army training site. For one of "the eight new technical training installations rushed into operation" during 1942–3, a Kearns, Utah "plot of 1,405 acres was purchased". The Kearns Center military unit was activated (designated) 1 May 1942, and "a contract for a theater of operations cantonment was let" on 16 June 1942. "Basic Training Center No. 5" began operations on 17 July and opened on 20 July under Training Command. A "Denver and Rio Grande Western" spur was built to the installation's railroad station, and by 21 August all barracks were complete. "Upon completion of their basic training most of the pre-aviation cadets [were] sent to one of the many college operated [flight schools] under the supervision of the Army Air Corp." [sic]. The 510th Training Group and 3 technical school squadrons (1032d, 1033d, and 1034th) were assigned to Kearns on 10 September 1942, and Kearns' commander—Colonel Leo F. Post—arrived by September 12. Construction was completed in October 1942 and Kearns' "basic military training and technical training" continued until 30 Sep 43.

Nine B-24 Liberator bombardment groups were at Kearns, but arrived and left by train as there was no airfield. --459th, 460th, 455th, 456th, 465th, 466th, 467th, 458th and from Gowen Field, 461st—formed 31 August-17 October 1943. The base transferred to Second Air Force on 1 October 1943, and the bomb groups all were reassigned by the end of 1943 (e.g., the 461st to Wendover Field). In January 1944, Kearns AAF began performing personnel replacement training, rather than group training. In April, ground echelon training for B-24 support personnel was ended.

=== Camp Kearns ===
In April 1944, "Camp Kearns" was returned to the Western Technical Training Command when the WTTC's Fort Logan in Colorado transferred to the Air Service Command—then on 1 July 1944 Camp Kearns transferred to AAF Personnel Distribution Command.

=== Army Air Base Kearns ===
Redesignated Army Air Base, Kearns on 1 October 1944 when transferred to the Second Air Force, command of the base transferred from Converse R. Lewis to Colonel Walter F. Siegmund.

Both the "Overseas Replacement Depot, Kearns, Utah" and "Salt Lake City Army Air Field...under command jurisdiction of Kearns ORD" transferred to Strategic Air Command on 21 March 1946. Kearns ORD & SLC AAFld (along with North Carolina's Greensboro ORD & the Greensboro-High Point Army Airfield) transferred to AAFTC on 30 April and Kearns finally transferred to Air Defense Command (31 July). The base (including Kearns AAF) was inactivated on 15 August 1946 and transferred to the War Assets Administration for disposal. The War Assets Administration declared Kearns surplus on 24 January 1947, and the high bid by Standard Surplus was opened in July 1948 for the 1,200 acres (490 ha) installation with only 100 remaining buildings. A "Camp Kearns Memorial" was emplaced at the Arlo D. James Kearns Veterans Memorial Park (later moved to 40°38.849′N 112°00.354′W.)

A theater for "colored personnel" became part of Kearns Junior High School. A base chapel is now part of Our Lady of Perpetual Help Catholic Church. The base train station is a day-care center. A cannon that had stood next to the headquarters' flagpole now decorates the corner of 40th West and 54th South.

The World War I-era cannon and flagpole from the old Camp Kearns military base have been relocated to the Kearns township recreation center, 5670 S. Cougar Lane (4800 West). They are now part of the new Kearns Veterans Memorial Plaza, dedicated Nov. 10, 2012.

== See also ==
- Utah World War II Army Airfields
- Western Technical Training Command
