= USS Florence Nightingale =

1941 Elizabeth C. Stanton-class transport

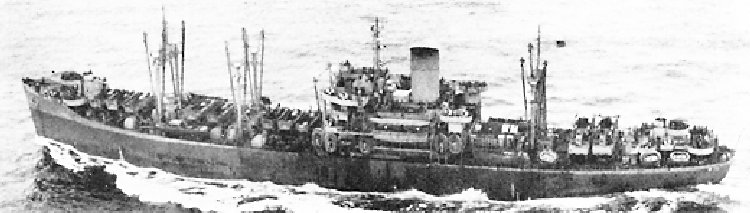
- USS Florence Nightingale

History

United States
- Name: Mormacsun; USS Florence Nightingale (17 September 1942 – 1 May 1946); Japan Transport (July 1953–3 December 1959); Texas (3 December 1959)
- Namesake: Florence Nightingale
- Builder: Moore Dry Dock Company, Oakland, California
- Launched: 28 August 1940
- Acquired: 13 September 1942
- Commissioned: 17 September 1942
- Decommissioned: 1 May 1946
- Honors and awards: 4 battle stars (World War II)
- Fate: Sold for scrap to Zidell Explorations on 2 November 1970.

General characteristics
- Class & type: Elizabeth C. Stanton-class transport
- Displacement: 7,980 long tons (8,108 t) light; 14,909 long tons (15,148 t) full
- Length: 492 ft (150 m)
- Beam: 69 ft (21 m)
- Draft: 24 ft (7.3 m)
- Propulsion: Steam turbine, single shaft, 8,500 hp (6,338 kW)
- Speed: 18 knots (33 km/h; 21 mph)
- Complement: 396 officers and enlisted
- Armament: 1 × single 5"/38 caliber gun; 4 × single 3"/50 caliber guns

USS Florence Nightingale (AP-70) was a Maritime Commission type C3-M cargo ship built as Mormacsun for Moore-McCormack Lines. Mormacsun operated for Moore-McCormack from May 1941 until December 1941 when she came under the War Shipping Administration (WSA) for the duration of World War II. The ship operated with Moore-McCormack as the WSA agent, playing an important role in early supply of the Southwest Pacific, until transfer to the United States Navy September 1942 and commissioning as Florence Nightingale whereupon she became an Elizabeth C. Stanton-class transport ship. She was named for Florence Nightingale (1820–1910), the nursing pioneer, and is one of the few United States Navy ships named after a woman. The ship was returned to WSA in 1946 and then to Moore-McCormack operating as Mormacsun until sold to operate as Japan Transport and lastly as Texas.

== Construction and pre Navy operations ==
Mormacsun was launched on 28 August 1940 by Moore Shipbuilding and Drydock Company, Oakland, California sponsored by Miss Carlotta S. Chapman. She was delivered to Moore-McCormack Lines in May 1941 and placed under the War Shipping Administration on 20 December 1941 at San Francisco allocated to operate under U.S. Army charter by Moore-McCormack.

The new ship, with 67 crated P-40s—more aircraft than the larger SS President Coolidge could transport, was one of six ships involved in delivery of vitally needed pursuit aircraft intended for the Philippines and diverted to Australia during early February 1942. Mormacsun departed San Francisco unescorted on 26 December 1941 loaded with aircraft, ammunition and bombs, including 9.2 million .30 caliber rounds, almost 16,500 81 mm mortar rounds, 2,952 300-pound and 13,855 100-pound bombs. Outbound the ship was attacked by friendly aircraft but escaped without damage to arrive in Brisbane 19 January 1942. The ship was drafted into the effort to run the Japanese blockade of the Philippines but was under orders to go no further than the Netherlands Indies to transship cargo to smaller vessels. The transfer of cargo destined for the Philippines was actually made from Mormacsun to two smaller vessels, the British Hanyang and Yochow of The China Navigation Company, at Perth but after the Bombing of Darwin those vessels returned to Australia where the supplies were unloaded.

On 12 August 1942 in New York the ship was delivered to War Department custody awaiting bareboat charter and operation by the US Navy on 13 September 1942.

== Naval service history ==
Florence Nightingale was commissioned 17 September 1942 as AP-70. The ship sailed from Norfolk, Virginia on 23 October 1942 in the task force bound for the invasion of North Africa, and between 8–15 November lay off Port Lyautey, Morocco, landing troops and cargo. Returning to Norfolk on 30 November, she made two voyages to Algeria, carrying reinforcements and cargo out, and prisoners of war back, returning to New York from the second, on 11 March 1943. After brief overhaul and exercising in Chesapeake Bay, Florence Nightingale sailed from Norfolk on 8 June with troops for the invasion of Sicily, landing them through hazardous surf conditions at Scoglitti from 10 to 12 July.

Returning to New York on 3 August 1943, Florence Nightingale voyaged to Oran in September, and on 8 October sailed from New York for Belfast, Northern Ireland. She carried men from Glasgow, Scotland, to Iceland, before returning to Boston on 17 November to load for the first of two transport voyages to the Firth of Clyde, Scotland, from New York. Laden with soldiers and nurses, she sailed from New York on 27 February 1944 for Cardiff, where she landed her original passengers, then sailed to Belfast to embark soldiers for the Mediterranean Sea. From 21 March, she carried troops among Mediterranean bases, and took part in landing operations in preparation for the invasion of southern France, for which she sortied from Naples on 13 August. She landed her troops in the initial assault on 15 August, and returned with casualties to Naples three days later. Until 25 October, when she sailed for home, Florence Nightingale brought reinforcements from Oran to the fighting in southern France.

Overhauled at New York from 8 November – 18 December, Florence Nightingale loaded Marines at Norfolk, and with them arrived at Pearl Harbor on 10 January 1945. Here she debarked the Marines and loaded soldiers and Army equipment for the Marianas. She sailed among these islands, transporting casualties, mail, and cargo to Guam, made one cargo voyage to Ulithi, and returned to Pearl Harbor on 22 March. On 7 April, again troop laden, she got underway for Okinawa, off which she lay to discharge reinforcements from 3–8 May, undergoing many air raids but suffering no damage.

The transport reached San Francisco from action waters on 27 May 1945, and sailed 11 days later to carry men of naval construction battalions and their equipment to Okinawa. She returned to Pearl Harbor on 20 August to begin occupation transport duty, which found her calling at Eniwetok and Yokosuka before her return to Portland, Oregon, on 15 November.

Between 21 November and 6 December 1945 the Florence Nightingale transported Project Paperclip V-2 rocket scientists, including Hans Lindenberg, from Le Havre to New York.

Between 13 December and 16 February 1946, she again voyaged to the Far East, carrying occupation troops to Korea, and returning to Long Beach, California, with servicemen eligible for discharge. At Long Beach she loaded German prisoners of war, with whom she sailed for Liverpool, England, on 26 February. Landing the homeward-bound Germans in England for further transfer, Florence Nightingale embarked troops at Le Havre for transportation to New York City, where she docked on 8 April 1946. The transport was decommissioned on 1 May 1946 and transferred to the War Shipping Administration the same day.

Florence Nightingale received four battle stars for World War II service.

== Commercial operation ==
On 1 May 1946, the ship was delivered to Moore-McCormack Lines at Hoboken, New Jersey and operated for the line until sold to Pacific Transport Lines in July 1953 and renamed Japan Transport. The ship was then sold to States Steamship Co. August 1957 and renamed Texas. The ship was traded in to the government on 20 May 1966, placed in the Olympia, Washington reserve fleet until sold for scrap to Zidell Explorations on 2 November 1970.

== Bibliography ==
- "Florence Nightingale". NHHC.
- Maritime Administration. "Mormacsun". Ship History Database Vessel Status Card. Maritime Administration. Archived from the original on 24 April 2014.
- Masterson, Dr. James R. (1949). U. S. Army Transportation In The Southwest Pacific Area 1941–1947. Washington, D. C.: Transportation Unit, Historical Division, Special Staff, U. S. Army.
- Matloff, Maurice; Snell, Edwin M. (1953–59). The War Department: Strategic Planning For Coalition Warfare 1941-1942. United States Army In World War II. Washington, DC: Center Of Military History, United States Army. LCCN 53061477.
- Morton, Louis (1962). The War in the Pacific—Strategy and Command: The First Two Years. United States Army In World War II. Washington, D. C.: Center Of Military History, United States Army. LCCN 61060001.
- Naval History And Heritage Command. "Florence Nightingale". Dictionary of American Naval Fighting Ships. Naval History And Heritage Command. Archived from the original on 2 March 2004.
- Williford, Glen M. (2010). Racing the Sunrise—Reinforcing America's Pacific Outposts 1941–1942. Annapolis, Maryland: Naval Institute Press. ISBN 978-1-59114-956-9. LCCN 2010030455.
