= Plastitar =

Type of plastic pollution combining tar and microplastics

Plastitar is a type of marine pollution consisting of microplastics and other plastic debris embedded in tar residues that encrust rocky coastlines. The term was coined in 2022 by researchers at the University of La Laguna in the Canary Islands, who first described the phenomenon on the coasts of Tenerife, El Hierro, and Lanzarote. Although the term is recent, a 2023 review found that plastitar formations had been documented under various names since at least 1973 in coastal environments across the world.

== Formation ==
Plastitar forms when tar balls from oil tankers or oil spills wash ashore and stick to coastal rocks. The tar partially evaporates and hardens, leaving a sticky surface. Waves then carry floating microplastics, plastic pellets, and other debris against the coated rocks, where the particles become trapped in the hardening mass. Lead researcher Javier Hernández Borges described the formations as "big squishy black balls littered with colorful plastic sprinkles".

The plastic in plastitar is primarily polyethylene (about 90.6% of recovered particles) and polypropylene (about 9.4%), in the form of fragments, pellets, and lines. A geochemical study of Mediterranean plastitar found that plastic nurdles tend to accumulate in the outer layers of tar mats, while linear fragments concentrate in the inner core. This layered structure indicates that the plastic is incorporated over time rather than in a single event. That study measured about 2.0 plastic items per gram of tar, with 801 particles recovered from 1,372 grams of sampled material.

== Distribution ==
Nearly all documented plastitar occurrences are along major oil transportation routes in the Northern Hemisphere, which indicates that the tar comes from tanker discharges rather than natural seeps.

Plastitar has been reported from the following regions:

- Atlantic Ocean: Canary Islands (Tenerife, El Hierro, Lanzarote), Bermuda, the Bahamas
- Mediterranean Sea: Malta, Croatia (Adriatic coast), Italy (Adriatic, Ligurian, and Ionian coasts), Mallorca, Menorca, Cabrera, Sardinia, and the Salento Peninsula
- Indian Ocean and Arabian Sea: India, United Arab Emirates (Arabian Gulf and Gulf of Oman)
- Pacific Ocean: Japan (Sea of Japan coast), Indonesia (Java Sea)

The earliest known record dates to 1973, based on a re-examination of historical literature by Ellrich, Ehlers, and Furukuma, who noted that earlier researchers had used terms such as "plasto-tar crusts", "plasto-tarballs", and "tar-bonded beach-conglomerate tarcrete" to describe what is now recognized as plastitar.

== Environmental effects ==
Domínguez-Hernández et al. described plastitar as "a double threat to the marine ecosystem with unknown environmental consequences" because it combines petroleum-derived polycyclic aromatic hydrocarbons (PAHs) with microplastics. Marine organisms that ingest plastitar fragments may suffer intestinal blockage, internal injuries, oxidative stress, and inflammatory responses.

Because plastitar is dark, it may also raise surface temperatures on coated rocks, which could affect intertidal organisms on those surfaces. As the formations weather and fragment, smaller pieces can enter the food web through consumption by benthic invertebrates and filter feeders.

== Related formations ==
Several other types of plastic-rock formation have been identified in coastal environments. Plastiglomerate, first described in 2014, is an indurate of melted plastic and rock. Plasticrust is a thin veneer of polyethylene smeared onto rock by wave action, first reported from Madeira in 2019. Plastistone, found on Trindade Island in 2023, consists of plastic cemented with rock. Pyroplastics are clasts of melted or burnt synthetic material.

== See also ==
- Marine debris
- Microplastics
- Oil spill
