= Alfred Dixon =

Alfred Dixon may refer to:

- Alfred Cardew Dixon (1865–1936), English mathematician
- Alfred Herbert Dixon (1857–1920), British businessman
- Alfred Dixon (artist) (1842–1919), British painter
