= Plastiglomerate =

Rock containing a mixture of natural debris held together by plastic

- Sedimentary rock
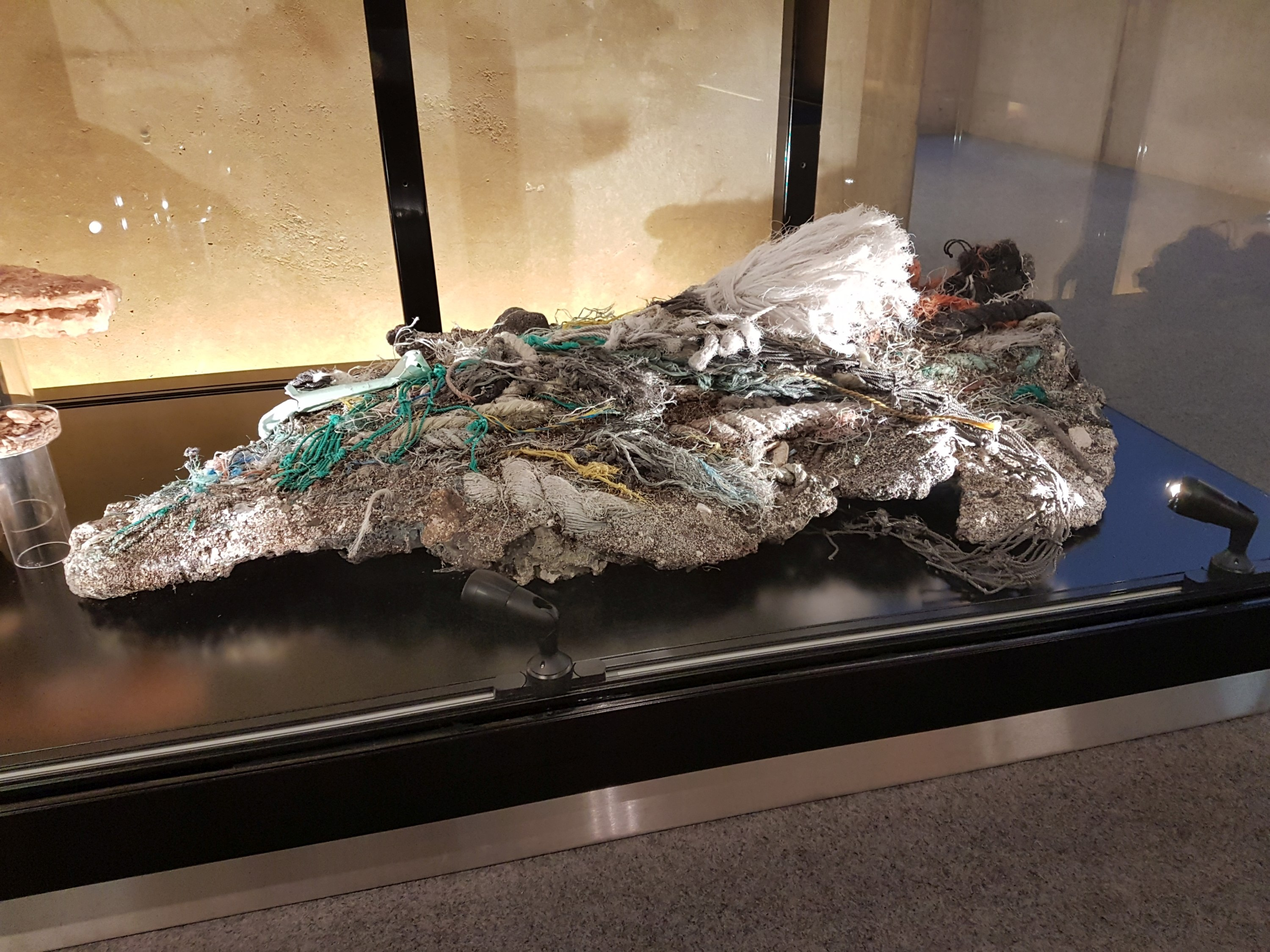
- Plastiglomerate

Composition
- Classification: Clastic
- Plastics and other preexisting rocks

The melting of plastic waste from campfires or high temperatures on beaches (1) is resulting in the formation of a new type of rock known as plastiglomerate (2). Formed plastiglomerate merges with surrounding sediment to create a compositionally different sediment layer (3).The emergence of this new layer is being used as physical evidence of a marker horizon for an Anthropocene Epoch (4).

Plastiglomerate is a rock made of a mixture of sedimentary grains, and other natural debris (e.g. shells, wood) that is held together by plastic. It has been considered a potential marker of the Anthropocene, an informal epoch of the Quaternary proposed by some social scientists, environmentalists, and geologists.

== Origin ==
Plastiglomerates form along shorelines where natural sedimentary grains and organic debris are agglutinated by melted plastic. They can be created during campfire burning, as has been reported from Kamilo Beach on the island of Hawaii, or during hot weather, as is the case on Trindade Island.

== Depositional environment ==
Plastiglomerate could potentially form a marker horizon of human pollution on the geologic record. and may survive as future fossils. Plastiglomerate may also conceivably form in plastic-polluted regions affected by lava flows or forest fires. They have been found on the surface as well as beneath the sand. This suggests that plastiglomerates are being actively deposited into the sedimentary record. Some geophysicists and geologists speculate that plastiglomerates will not persist in the fossil record, however, or that they might "revert back to a source of oil from whence they came, given the right conditions of burial".

"In situ" plastiglomerate forms where plastic melts and fills in rock cavities. "Clastic" plastiglomerate is smaller solitary pieces that form where larger fused items become fragmented by waves. Plastiglomerate is denser than particles that are solely composed of plastic, which gives it greater potential to become buried and preserved in the rock record.

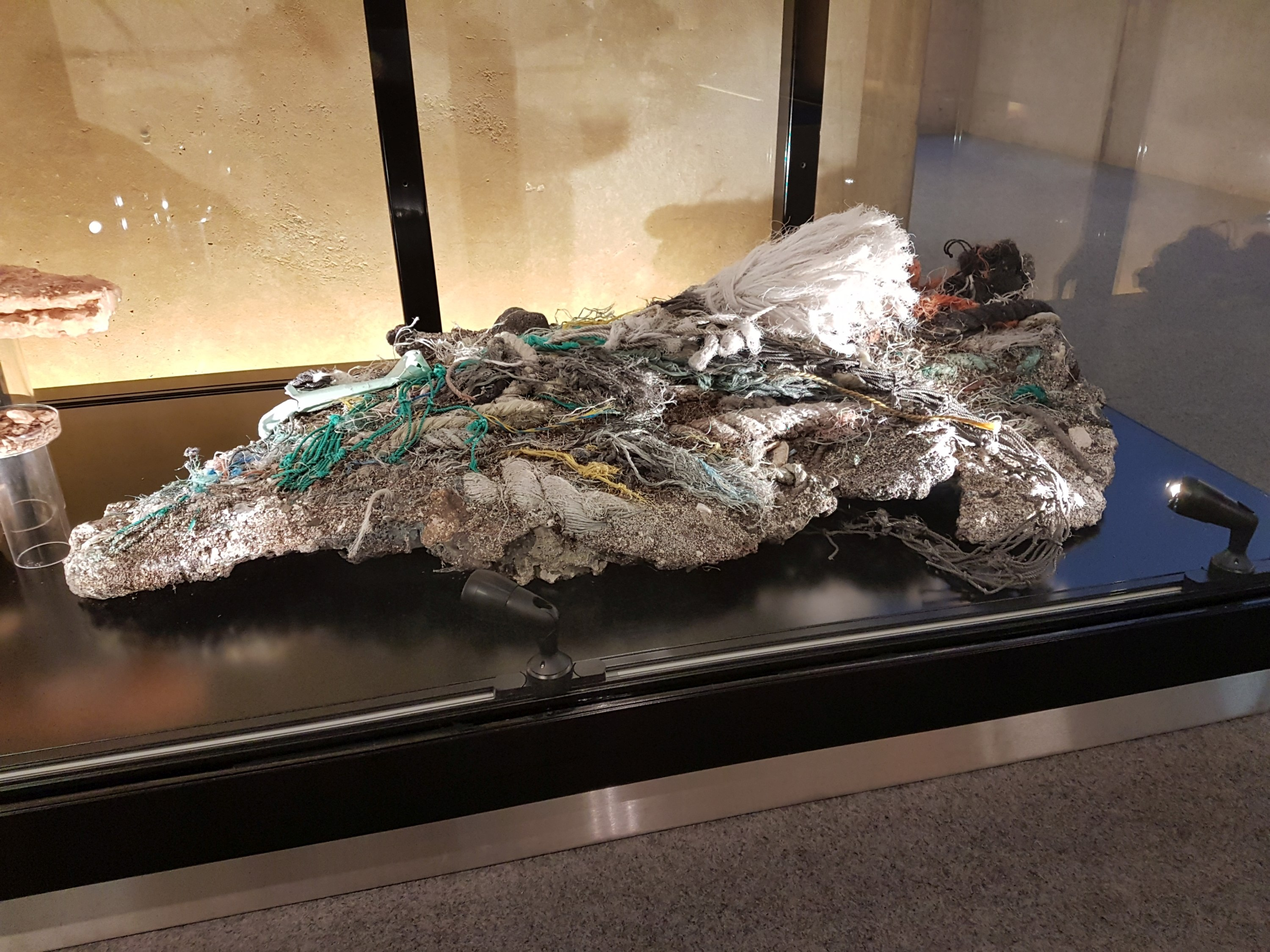
Plastiglomerate from Kamilo Beach displayed in the exhibition One Planet in Museon (The Hague, The Netherlands).

Plastiglomerates have been featured at the Yale Peabody Museum of Natural History; Oakville Galleries in Oakville, Ontario, Canada; Louis B. James Gallery in New York City; Carleton University Gallery in Ottawa, Ontario, Canada; Prosjektrom Normanns, Stavanger, Norway; and Museon in The Hague, Netherlands. Museon claims to have probably the largest piece of plastiglomerate, which is more than 1m long and 50cm wide.

== History ==
Charles Moore, a sea captain and oceanographer for the Algalita Marine Research Institute in Long Beach, California, discovered this substance in 2006 while surveying Kamilo Beach on the Big Island of Hawai’i. Geology professor, Dr. Patricia Corcoran and Visual artist professor, Kelly Jazvac of the University of Western Ontario investigated the samples on Kamilo Beach in 2012 where they also coined the term "plastiglomerate". Approximately one-fifth of the plastiglomerates found at Kamilo Beach consisted of fishing debris, one quarter of broken lid containers, and one half consisted of plastic "confetti". The plastiglomerate at Kamilo Beach was more likely created from human campfires than from molten lava flows. In 2023, it was reported plastistone had been discovered on remote Trindade Island, a known refuge for turtles.

== See also ==
- Anthropic rock
- Plastic pollution
- Plastistone
- Plasticrust
