= James Harden-Hickey =

Franco-American author, editor, adventurer (1854–1898)

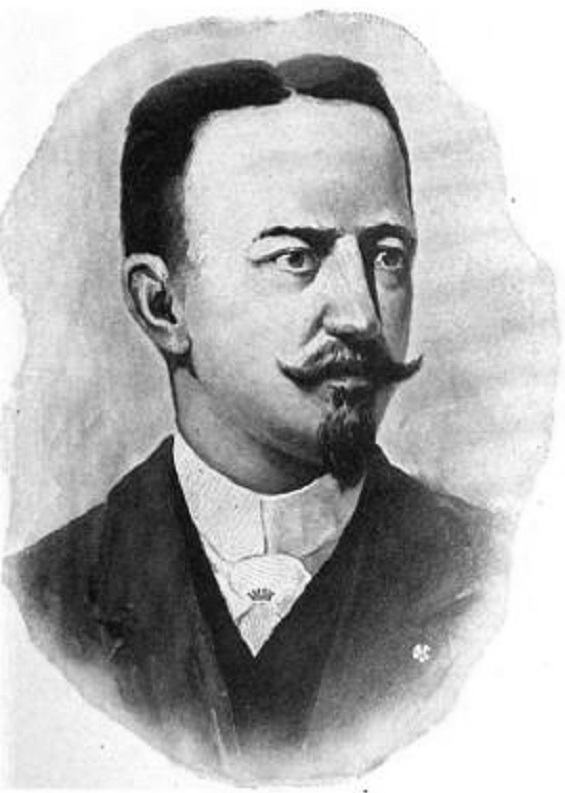

Prince of Trinidad
- Reign: 1893–1895
- Born: James Harden-Hickey; December 8, 1854; San Francisco, California
- Died: February 9, 1898 (aged 43); El Paso, Texas
- Spouse: Countess de Saint-Pery; Annie Harper Flagler
Regnal name
- James I
- Education: University of Leipzig Saint-Cyr
- Occupations: Author, newspaper editor, duellist, and adventurer
- Children: 2 children
- Awards: Order of the Cross of Trinidad

James Harden-Hickey (born James Aloysius Harden, December 8, 1854 – February 9, 1898) was a Franco-American author, newspaper editor, duel ist and adventurer. He was the founder of the self-proclaimed Principality of Trinidad, claiming title over the uninhabited island of Trindade in the South Atlantic Ocean.

== Early life ==
James Aloysius Harden was born in San Francisco on December 8, 1854. To avoid the violent city still in the madness of the gold rush, James' French mother, who came from a family of Irish Catholic exiles named Hickey, took him to live in Paris, which was then an Empire under the rule of Napoleon III. The nephew of Napoleon I left his mark on James by making France a wild, flamboyant stage for ornate theatrical displays and public works, and mystifying ceremonies. As a child, James was fascinated with the French court and all of its glamour and pomp. Also, because of the lively brilliance of the live theatre, he acquired a lifelong liking for adventure. During boyhood, he was taught in Belgium by the Jesuits and later studied law at the University of Leipzig. He entered the French military academy, Saint-Cyr, at 19. In 1875, he graduated with high marks.

Shortly thereafter, his father died. Three years later, Harden-Hickey married the Countess de Saint-Pery and fathered two children. By then he had mastered French, was accounted a master swordsman and began writing novels.

== Literary career ==
On November 10, 1878, Harden-Hickey first published the newspaper Triboulet, named for a jester of King Louis XII, eight years after Napoleon's fall from power. Though popular, the strongly anti-republican stand of this paper involved Harden-Hickey in no fewer than a dozen duels, several dozen lawsuits and numerous fines. Sadly for Harden-Hickey and his fellow royalists, their funds were exhausted by 1887.

As of 1880, he had 11 novels published. Two of the novels are borrowed from Michael Strogoff by Jules Verne, and another is based on Don Quixote by Miguel de Cervantes Saavedra. His novels praise the virtues of monarchies and are anti-democratic. James was made a baron of the Holy Roman Empire (which legally ceased to exist in 1806) for his strong defence of the church in his works and in practice.

His novels include the following, all published under the pen name Saint Patrice:

- Un Amour Vendeen
- Lettres d'un Yankee
- Merveilleuses Adventures de Nabuchodonosor Nosebreaker
- Un Amour dans le Monde
- Memoirs d'un Gommeux

Sometime after, James Harden-Hickey divorced his first wife and renounced Catholicism; he acquired an interest in Buddhism and Theosophy. This was a turning point in his life, and he took the opportunity to travel around the world, staying a year in India, learning Sanskrit and studying the philosophy of the Buddha. He returned to Paris and met Annie Harper Flagler, daughter of American iron industrialist John Haldane Flagler and wife Annie Harper Converse Flagler (sister of American banker Edmund C. Converse). Her father was head and founder of the National Tube Company, a successful pipe company, and one of Andrew Carnegie's partners in the steel business. They were married at the Fifth Avenue Presbyterian Church in New York on March 17 (St. Patrick's Day), 1891. He lived with and off the Flaglers in New York for two years.

Travelling to Tibet before his marriage, his crew made a stop in the South Atlantic. Harden-Hickey noticed that the tiny island of Trinidad in the South Atlantic Ocean had never been claimed by any country and was, legally, "res nullius". He claimed the island and proclaimed himself James I, Prince of Trinidad. He wanted an independent state with himself as military dictator, and later in 1893, he got just that.

== As Prince James I of Trinidad ==
The now-James I was given attention – most of it negative and derogatory – by various nations and news organisations when he started selling Principality of Trinidad government bonds, opened an office in New York City and began creating secretarial appointments, such as for Mr. de la Boissière, whom he titled Count and named his Secretary of State.

Trinidad was seized by Great Britain, however, in 1895 as a telegraph cable-relay station, and James I was forced to surrender it to them, leaving him with only a homemade crown and a schooner. While the Brazilians and British were threatening war over their respective claims, James I was forgotten, although he had the prior claim of sovereignty. Appeals to the United States to act as a mediator did nothing for his cause when US Secretary of State John Milton Hay released his letter appealing for American mediation to the press, opening James I to harsh ridicule in the popular press.

After the British invaded "his" Trinidad island in 1895, James I designed a plan to invade England from Ireland and even asked the wealthy Henry Flagler to finance his invasion plan, but Flagler demurred and denied his request. James I then tried to raise money by selling his ranch in Mexico but failed to assemble enough funds to continue operating.

Although somewhat apocryphal, there is evidence to suggest that during this time, James I was approached by a certain filibuster named Ralston J. Markowe with a plan in 1895 to make him the King of Hawai'i (per Richard Harding Davis, but any such plans as may have existed never came to fruition).

== Later years ==
Over the next two years, Harden-Hickey fell into deep depression.

James Harden-Hickey had written a book titled Euthanasia: The Aesthetics of Suicide. He took an overdose of morphine on February 9, 1898, in an El Paso, Texas hotel.

Coat of arms of James Harden-Hickey

Regnal titles
New title Principality formed	Prince of Trinidad (self-proclaimed); 1893–1895	Vacant Principality dissolved
