= Anthropic rock =

Rock that is made, modified, and moved by humans

Anthropic rock is rock that is made, modified and moved by humans. Concrete is the most widely known example of this. The new category has been proposed to recognise that human-made rocks are likely to last for long periods of Earth's future geological time, and will be important in humanity's long-term future.

== History ==
Historically, anthropogenic lithogenesis is a new event or process on Earth. For millennia humans dug and built only with natural rock. Archaeologists, during 1998, reported that artificial rock was made in ancient Mesopotamia. The ancient Romans developed and widely used concrete, much of which is intact today. British Victorians were very familiar with the durable mock-rock surface formations used in public parks, constructed of Pulhamite and Coade stone. Concrete, as we know it today, dates from the development of modern cement in 1756.

== Classification and theory ==
The US geologist James Ross Underwood Jr. advocated a fourth class of rocks to be added to Earth and planetary materials studies which would supplement geology's long-identified igneous, sedimentary and metamorphic groups. His practical proposal for an "anthropic rocks" category recognizes the pervading spread of humankind and its industrial products.

== Future ==
NASA and others have offered many settlement proposals that entail the use of in-situ resources of the Moon and Mars by astronauts.

The relatively inert nature of rocks has been exploited in many methods to immobilize chemical and/or radioactive wastes; the Australian researcher, A.E. Ringwood, developed a titanate ceramic called Synroc, his acronym for "synthetic rock". D.J. Sheppard proposed Sun-orbiting space colonies, interplanetary and interstellar spaceships ought to be manufactured of concrete. There have also been proposals for deep-diving submarines constructed of concrete and concrete ships.

Alan Weisman in The World Without Us (2007) noted that anthropic rocks of all kinds, among other artifacts, will exist far into our planet's future even should our species disappear "tomorrow".

== See also ==
- Anthropocene
- Plastiglomerate
