= Principality of Trinidad =

1893–1895 unrecognized state

Principality of Trinidad Principauté de Trinidad (French) Principado de Trinidad (Portuguese)
- 1893–1895
- Flag Coat of arms

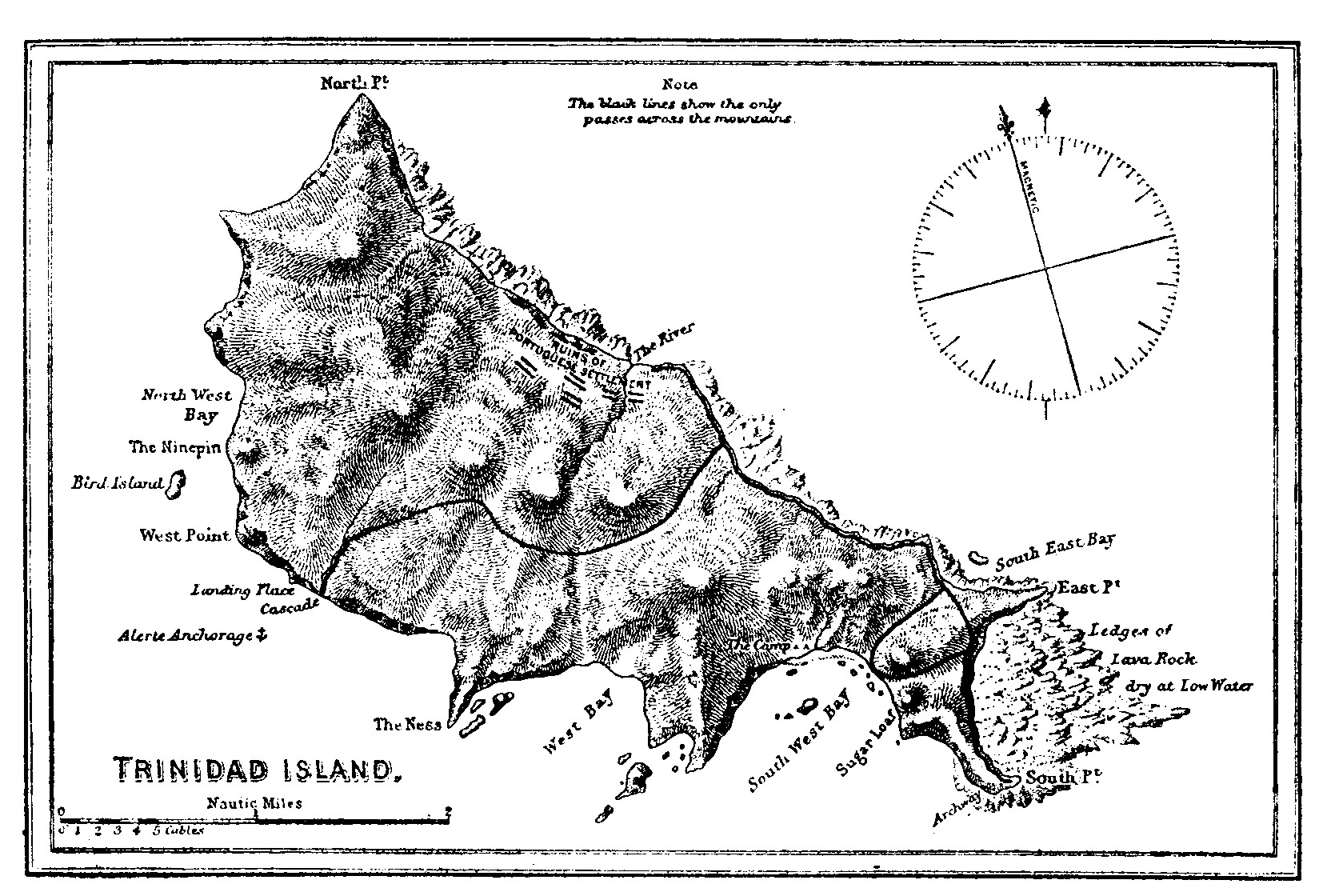
- Map of Trinidad from the book, The Cruise of the Alerte
- Status: Unrecognized state
- Common languages: English, French, Portuguese
- Government: Self-proclaimed monarchy
  - Prince: James I
- History
  - Declared: 1893
  - Disestablished: 1895
Preceded by	Succeeded by
First Brazilian Republic; United Kingdom of Great Britain and Ireland	First Brazilian Republic

The Principality of Trinidad was a short-lived unrecognized state declared in 1893 when the American James Harden-Hickey claimed the uninhabited Trindade Island in the South Atlantic. He declared himself James I, Prince of Trinidad, and intended for the islands to become a military dictatorship under his leadership. Britain and Brazil later argued over the territory, and it is now a part of the state of Espírito Santo in southeastern Brazil.

== Name ==
The original name of the island, Trindade, is Portuguese for 'trinity'; Trinidad is the Spanish cognate. It is unclear why Harden-Hickey chose to translate the name from Portuguese into Spanish, and not English. Earlier, nearby Ascension Island had been renamed from its original Portuguese name Ascensão when it passed into British hands.

== History ==
While traveling to Tibet before his marriage, Harden-Hickey noticed the tiny island of Trindade in the South Atlantic Ocean, which had never been claimed by any country and was, legally, terra nullius. In 1893, wanting an independent state where he could serve as its ruler, he claimed the island and proclaimed himself James I, the Prince of Trinidad.

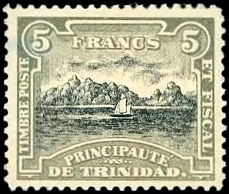
Stamp of the Principality of Trinidad, 5f, 1893

He designed postage stamps, a national flag and coat of arms, and established a chivalric order, the Cross of Trinidad. He bought a schooner to transport colonists, appointed M. Le Comte De la Boissiere as Secretary of State, and opened a consular office at 217 West 36th Street in New York City. He issued government bonds to finance the construction of infrastructure on the island.

In July 1895, the British tried to take possession of the island, basing their claim on the 1700 visit by English astronomer Edmund Halley. The British planned to use the island as a telegraph cable station. However, Brazilian diplomatic efforts pressed a successful claim to Brazilian sovereignty, based on the island's discovery in 1502 by Portuguese navigators.

To demonstrate sovereignty over the island, the state of Espírito Santo, which took the island, built a landmark on 24 January 1897.

=== Today ===
Today, Brazil marks its presence with a permanent Brazilian Navy base on the main island.
