= SMS Cap Trafalgar =

German ocean liner

Coordinates: 20°29′S 29°18′W

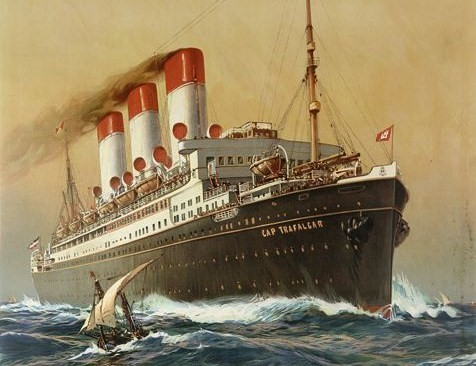
- Cap Trafalgar

History

German Empire
- Name: Cap Trafalgar
- Namesake: Cape Trafalgar
- Owner: Hamburg Südamerikanische Dampfschifffahrts-Gesellschaft
- Builder: AG Vulcan, Hamburg
- Yard number: 334
- Launched: 31 July 1913
- In service: 1 April 1914
- Home port: Hamburg, Germany
- Fate: Sunk in combat, 14 September 1914

General characteristics
- Tonnage: 18,710 GRT
- Displacement: 23,640 tons
- Length: 613 ft (187 m)
- Beam: 72 ft (22 m)
- Installed power: 15,000 shaft horsepower
- Propulsion: 2 × 4-cylinder triple-expansion engines; 1 × steam turbine; 3 × propellers
- Speed: 17 knots
- Armament: (as auxiliary cruiser): 2 × 10.5 cm (4.1 in) guns; 6 × 37 mm (1.46 in) pom-poms

SS Cap Trafalgar was a German ocean liner launched in 1913 for Hamburg Süd. In 1914, she was converted for use as an auxiliary cruiser during World War I. She was sunk in action with HMS Carmania, also a converted ocean liner, in a furious action in the South Atlantic on 14 September 1914. It was the world's first battle between former ocean liners.

== Early career ==
The passenger liner SS Cap Trafalgar was built at the AG Vulcan Shipyard on the Elbe River in Hamburg, Germany for the Hamburg-South America Line for their service between Germany and the River Plate (Río de la Plata). She was named after the Spanish Cape Trafalgar, scene of the famous Battle of Trafalgar in 1805. A three-funneled vessel of 613 ft (187 m) length and 72 ft (22 m) beam, she measured 18,710 GRT and could carry nearly 1,600 passengers (400 1st class, 276 2nd class, 913 3rd or steerage class. A triple-screw vessel, her outer propellers were powered by two triple-expansion steam engines with the centre one driven by an exhaust turbine.

When Cap Trafalgar began her maiden voyage on 10 April 1914 from Hamburg for South American ports in Brazil, Argentina and Uruguay, she was the largest vessel traveling on the South American service and among the most luxurious. Her upper decks included a swimming pool and a cafe in a greenhouse while her 1st class halls and stairwells were full of beautiful gold filigree, and her staterooms were furnished in the highest fashion of the period. She was the epitome of pomp, elegance, and Germanic engineering but when war was declared, her brief career among the socialites and wealthy of the world ended abruptly.

== Sinking ==
Sinking of SMS Cap Trafalgar
- Part of Naval warfare of World War I
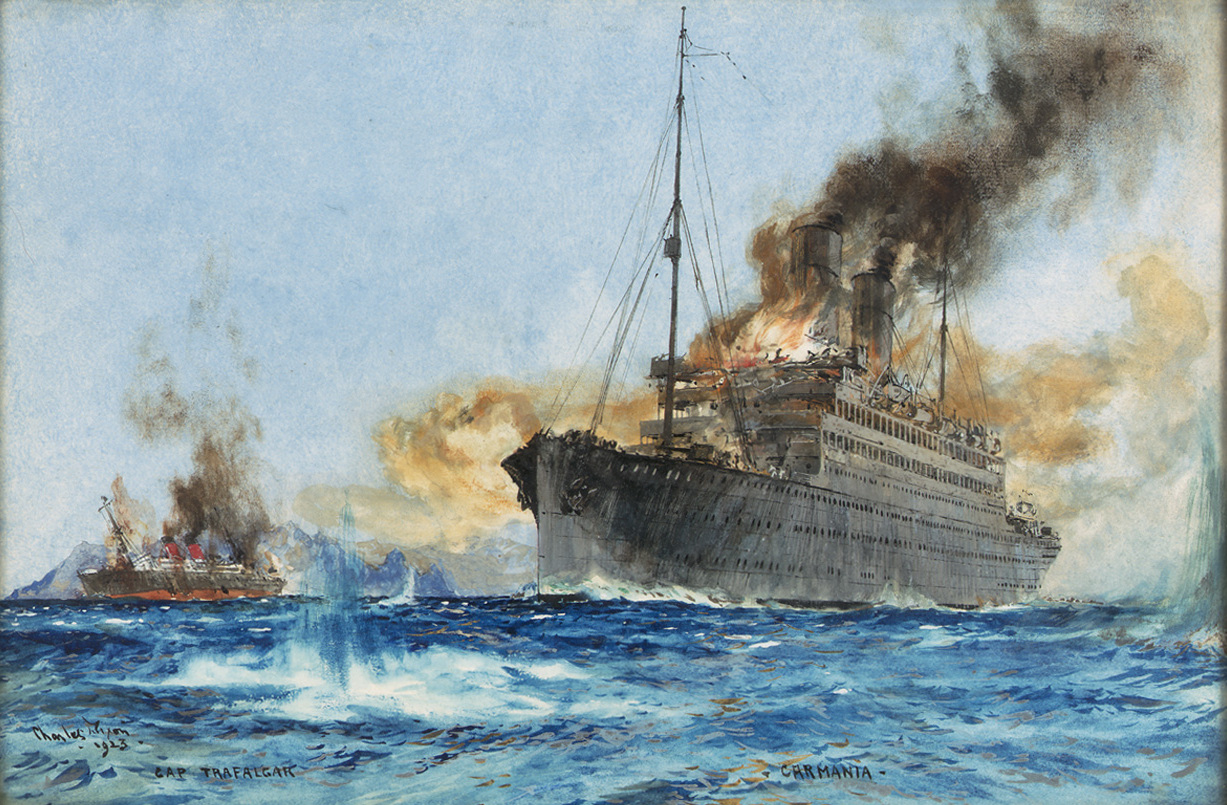
- 'Carmania' sinking the 'Cap Trafalgar' off Trinidade Island in the South Atlantic, 14 September 1914; Charles Dixon, 1923
Date	14 September 1914
Location	Off Trindade Island, South Atlantic Ocean (Brazil)
Result	British victory

Belligerents
Germany	United Kingdom

Commanders and leaders
Julius Wirth †	Noel Grant

Strength
SMS Cap Trafalgar	HMS Carmania

Casualties and losses
16–51 killed; 279 captured; Cap Trafalgar sunk	9 killed; Many wounded; Carmania damaged

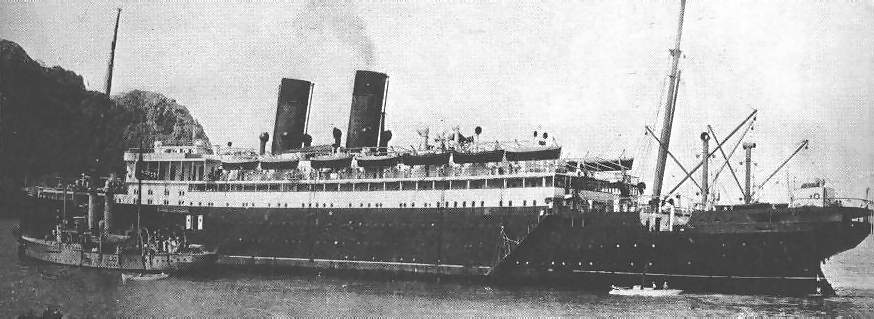
Cap Trafalgar and Eber in Trindade

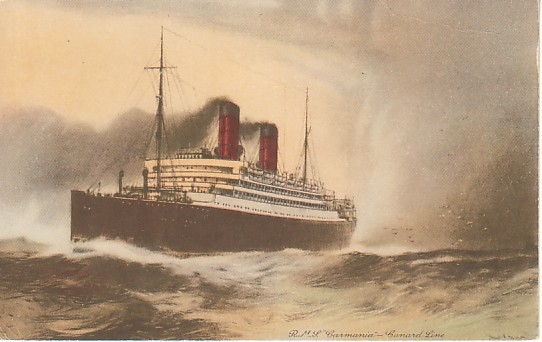
The Carmania

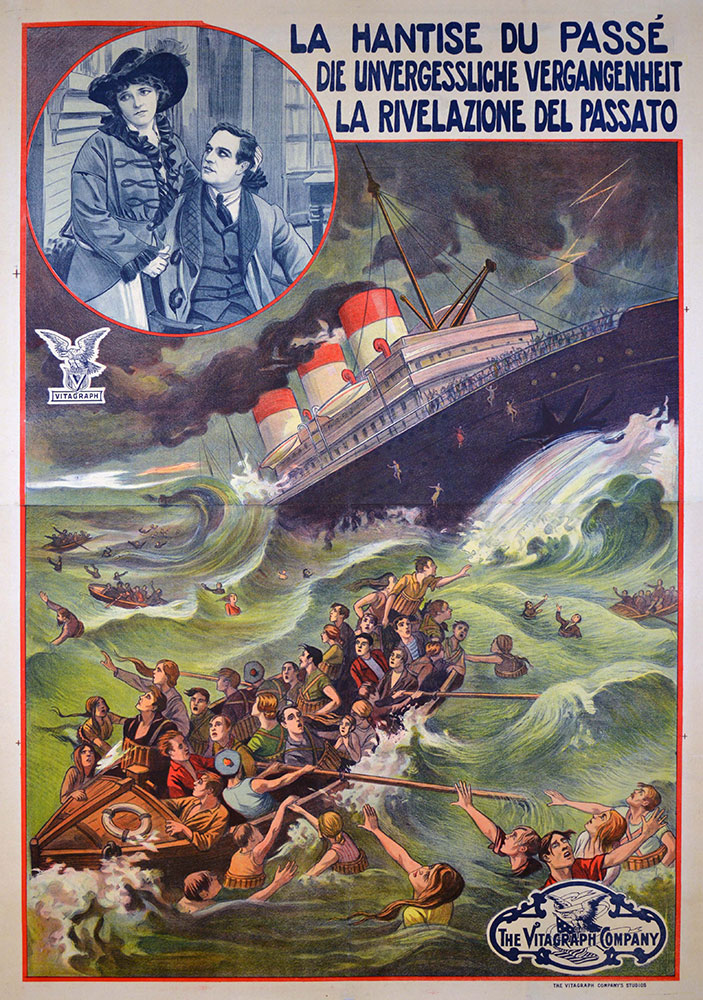
1914 poster of the Vitagraph Company's silent film The Memories That Haunt featuring a ship bearing a strong resemblance to Cap Trafalgar and predicting her sinking. The funnels are in Hamburg Süd colors. The film was released April 7, 1914. Cap Trafalgar was in service from 1 April 1914 until sunk on 14 September 1914.

When war began in Europe in August 1914, Cap Trafalgar was in Buenos Aires and was laid up pending orders and as already planned, the German Imperial Navy requisitioned her as an auxiliary cruiser. On 18 August she arrived in Montevideo for coal and then sailed to rendezvous at the remote Brazilian island of Trindade, 500 mi (800 km) east of Brazil, with the gunboat SMS Eber, which transferred naval officers, ammunition and weapons to the liner. At the same time, her third funnel, which was a dummy, was removed. She was armed with two 10.5 cm SK L/40 naval guns and six 37 mm QF guns, manned by experienced naval personnel, and given the mission to sink British merchant shipping. She was given the codename Hilfskreuzer B (Auxiliary Cruiser B) and was commanded by Korvettenkapitän Wirth. After a fruitless initial cruise, Cap Trafalgar arrived on 13 September at a secret supply base at Trindade Island to take on fuel from a German colliers.

It was at this base on 14 September that the Carmania, a British ocean liner built for the Cunard Line launched in 1905, found the Cap Trafalgar, having been sent to flush out German colliers and small warships using the inhospitable island as a base against British merchant shipping. Following the outbreak of World War I, Carmania had been converted into an armed merchant cruiser with eight 4.7 in (120 mm) guns, and put under the command of Captain Noel Grant, Carmania spotted smoke early in the morning and some hours later was able to surprise the German ship with two colliers in the island's only harbour.

Disguised as the Carmania, Cap Trafalgar's only battle turned out to be against the real Carmania. Some accounts incorrectly allege that the Carmania was itself disguised as the Cap Trafalgar. (Note: "In a twist of incredible irony, the crew of the Cap Trafalgar, in an attempt to disguise their ship, had altered her appearance so that she would closely resemble one of the 'Pretty Sisters.' (Though it would later be said that the Carmania had also altered her appearance so that she might be mistaken for the Cap Trafalgar, there is no truth to the claim.)")

Location of the island of Trindade

Both captains realised that to win, their respective vessels required room to manoeuvre and so, the captains had separately steamed several miles from the island to gain that space. The Cap Trafalgar also sent out encoded messages in German, announcing the engagement, and the position as 35 degrees west, 26 degrees south, with a NNW heading. Then the ships turned towards each other and the Carmania began firing, but failed to score any hits, while the Cap Trafalgar landed the first shot. Carmania initially fared worse and in the ensuing two hours was hit 79 times, holed below the waterline and had the bridge destroyed by shellfire. However, as the range closed her own guns began to inflict damage, and fires raged on both ships, as sailors lined the rails firing machine guns at their opposite numbers as the ships came within a few hundred yards of each other. Neither ship had the fire control system or ammunition hoists of a warship, so ammunition had to be brought to the guns by hand while the guns fired directly, as they could.

Just as it seemed that the fires on Carmania were out of control, Cap Trafalgar veered off, lowering lifeboats as she heeled over to port. A shell below the waterline had opened several compartments, and the ship was rapidly sinking, although the colliers later rescued 279 sailors. Fifty-one were killed in the fighting or the sinking (other reports say sixteen or seventeen people died), including Captain Wirth. Carmania was also heavily damaged, listing severely and burning, with nine dead and many wounded. It was at this point that the German armed merchant cruiser SS Kronprinz Wilhelm arrived; however, with British warships nearby, its captain feared a trap, since many ships had heard the SOS calls of the Cap Trafalgar, which, though in German code, had been supplemented by messages from the Carmania with the British code. The Kronprinz Wilhelm sailed away without engaging.

The Carmania was listing badly and fires burned, while the bridge communication and navigation equipment were largely destroyed. She limped south, hoping to meet a British cruiser in the area. When rescue arrived on the 15th, the ship and crew likely had only a day or two before sinking. The next day Carmania was escorted into Pernambuco by other Royal Navy vessels. It appears that the German base at Trindade ceased to be maintained after this battle.

Some 300 Cap Trafalgar survivors were rescued by the collier Eleonore Woermann and taken to Buenos Aires. Most were interned for the duration of the war on Argentina's Martín García Island. The higher ranking officers were given parole to remain in Buenos Aires. Some of the crew escaped from imprisonment and either settled in Argentina or attempted to return to Germany. In 1918, the remaining crew were relocated to the Immigrant's Hotel in Buenos Aires. After the end of the War, approximately 100 of the Cap Trafalgar's crew who remained in Argentina wished to return to Germany and they were repatriated in September and October 1919.

== See also ==
- Battle of Río de Oro
