= Trindade hotspot =

Hypothesis about volcanic chain Vitória-Trindade

Coordinates: 20°31′30″S 29°19′30″W

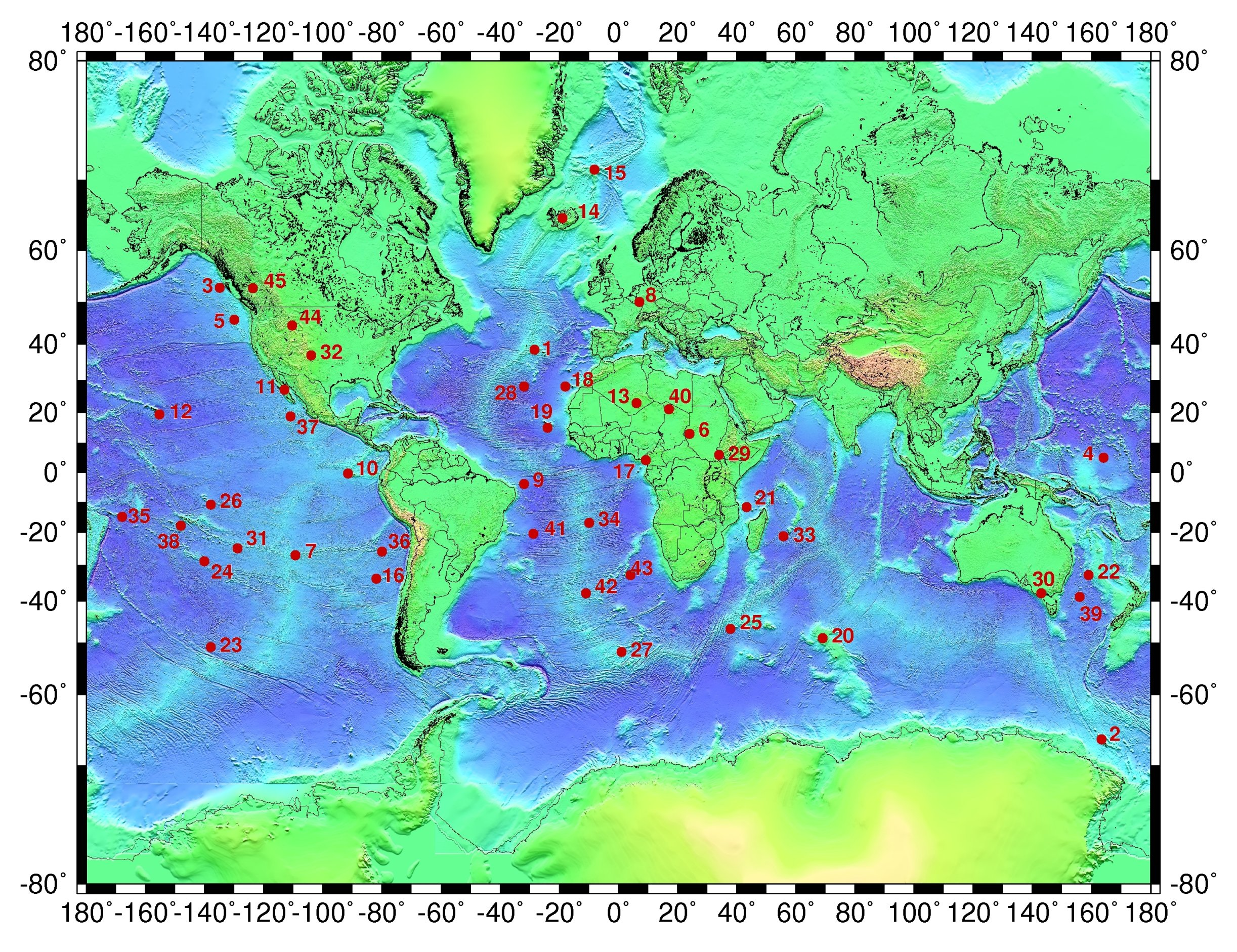
The Trindade hotspot is marked 41 on the map

The Trindade hotspot is a working hypothesis supposing that the submarine volcanic chain Vitória-Trindade, off the eastern coast of Brazil in the southern Atlantic Ocean, is a volcanic hotspot chain. It was considered that the supposed hot-spot should be responsible for the creation of the east-west trending Vitória-Trindade seamount chain, which includes the Trindade and Martim Vaz archipelago at its easternmost end. Trindade, a small island in the archipelago, is the hotspot's most recent eruptive center.

This idea was based on the geochemical data, especially of the highly silica-undersaturated alkaline ultramafic rocks of the Trindade Island and Martim Vaz Island. The isotopic data is OIB-type, which is favourable to the hot-spot hypothesis. However, the volcanic chain direction is E-W and the absolute motion vector of the South America Plate is NW. Therefore, the volcanic chain cannot be a hot-spot chain. Recent research papers, such as Skoletnev, Peyve & Truko 2010 and Motoki, Motoki & Melo 2012, proposed that the hot mantle penetrated horizontally along the Vitória-Trindade fracture zone which is present in the lithospheric mantle. Because of the same reason, the Fernando de Noronha Volcanic chain also is not a hot-spot chain. On the other hand, the NW-SE magmatic alignments, such as the Cruzeiro do Sul Chain, Bahia Chain, and Macau-Queimado, are considered to be hot-spot chains.
