= Charles Dixon (artist) =

English artist (1872–1934)

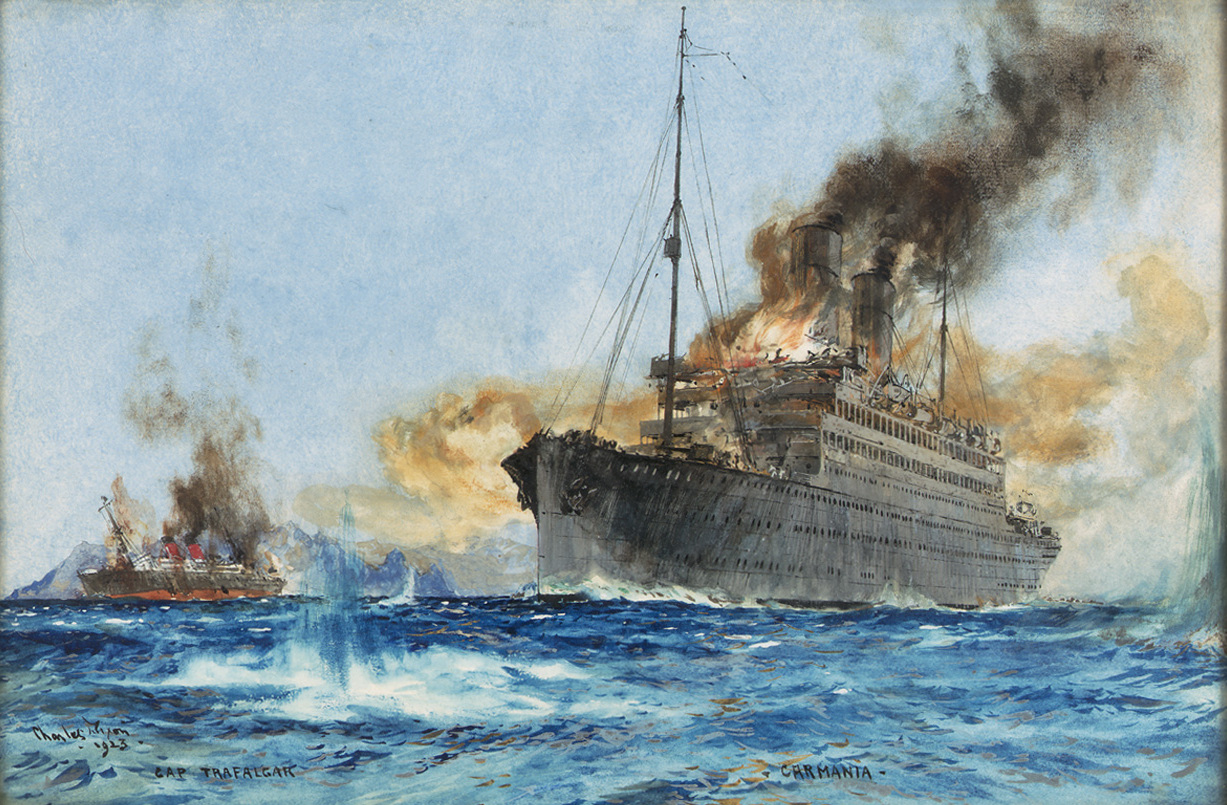
Carmania sinking the Cap Trafalgar off Trinidade Island in the South Atlantic, 14 September 1914 (1923)

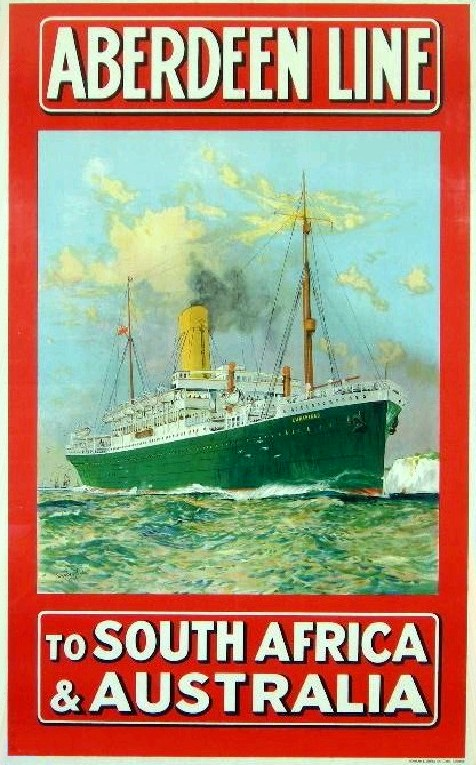
Poster advertising the Aberdeen Line by Dixon

Charles Edward Dixon (8 December 1872 – 12 September 1934) was an English artist who specialized in marine art. His work was highly successful and regularly exhibited at the Royal Academy. Several of his paintings are held by the National Maritime Museum and he was a regular contributing artist to magazines and periodicals.

Dixon was born at Goring-on-Thames in 1872, the son of Alfred Dixon (1842–1919), a successful genre painter, who educated his son in his trade. Charles too became a professional artist, and soon had a successful practice producing nautical scenes, both watercolours of coastal life and large oil paintings of historical or contemporary naval subjects. He exhibited regularly at the Royal Academy and several of his paintings are now in the collection of the National Maritime Museum in London. Among his work was a large body of work produced for magazines and periodicals, including The Graphic. In 1900 he was made a member of the Royal Institute of Painters in Water Colours. He lived at Itchenor in Sussex, where he was a keen yachtsman, and died at his home on 12 September 1934.
