= RMS Carmania (1905) =

Cunard Line transatlantic steam turbine ocean liner

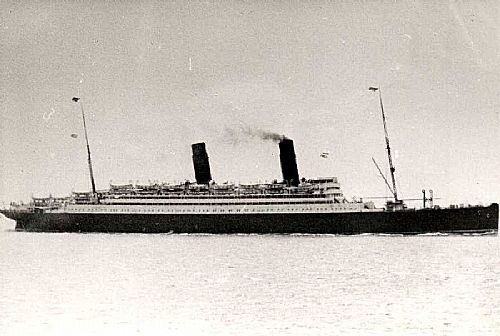
- Carmania in 1905

History

United Kingdom
- Name: Carmania
- Namesake: Carmania
- Owner: Cunard Line
- Operator: 1914–16: (United Kingdom) Royal Navy
- Port of registry: Liverpool
- Route: Liverpool – New York
- Builder: John Brown & Company, Clydebank
- Yard number: 366
- Laid down: 17 May 1904
- Launched: 21 February 1905
- Completed: November 1905
- Maiden voyage: 2 December 1905
- Identification: UK official number: 120901; Code letters HFBJ; 1914–16: Pennant number: M 55
- Fate: Scrapped 1932 at Blyth

General characteristics
- Type: Ocean liner
- Tonnage: 19,566 GRT, 9,250 NRT
- Length: 650.4 ft (198.2 m) registered length; 678 ft (207 m) o/a
- Beam: 72.2 ft (22.0 m)
- Draught: 33 ft 3 in (10.13 m)
- Depth: 40.0 ft (12.2 m)
- Decks: 3
- Installed power: 21,000 SHP
- Propulsion: 1 × High-pressure steam turbine; 2 × Low-pressure steam turbines; 3 × Propellers
- Speed: 20 knots (37 km/h; 23 mph)
- Capacity: As built: 2,650 berths in four classes; 1923: 1,440 berths; Cargo: 46,280 cubic feet (1,311 m^{3}) refrigerated
- Crew: 450
- Sensors & processing systems: By 1930: Submarine signalling; Wireless Direction finding
- Armament: (as AMC): 8 × QF 4.7 inch Mk V naval guns
- Notes: Sister ship: RMS Caronia

RMS Carmania was a Cunard Line transatlantic steam turbine ocean liner. She was launched in 1905 and scrapped in 1932. In World War I she was first an armed merchant cruiser (AMC) and then a troop ship. Carmania was the sister ship of RMS Caronia, although the two ships had different machinery. When new, the pair were the largest ships in the Cunard fleet.

== Building ==
Leonard Peskett designed Carmania. John Brown & Company built her, launching her on 21 February 1905 and completing her that November.

Carmania had three propellers, each driven by a Parsons steam turbine. A high-pressure turbine drove her centre shaft. Exhaust steam from the centre turbine powered a pair of low-pressure turbines that drove her port and starboard shafts.

Caronia, which was launched the year before, had twin propellers which were driven by quadruple-expansion engines. The essentially identical ships with the two different sets of engines was an opportunity to compare operations and clarify the advantages and disadvantages of turbine engines.

Carmania's sea trials were in November 1905. On the nautical measured mile off Skelmorlie she achieved 20.19 knots (37.39 km/h).

Another feature that differentiated the two liners was that Carmania had two tall forward deck ventilator cowls, which were absent on Caronia.

As built, Carmania had berths for 2,650 passengers: 300 first class, 350 second class, 1,000 third class and 1,000 steerage class. Her holds included 46,280 cubic feet (1,311 m^{3}) refrigerated cargo space.

== Service ==
Carmania left Liverpool on 2 December 1905 for her maiden voyage to New York arriving on 10 December. She completed the voyage in 7 days, 9 hours and 31 minutes, averaging 15.97 knots (29.58 km/h) over the 2,835 nautical miles (5,250 km) route.

Carmania plied between Liverpool and New York from 1905 to 1910. In the spring of 1906 she took H. G. Wells to North America for the first time. He noted her qualities in a book about his travels, "There are, one must admit, tremendous justifications for the belief in a sort of automatic ascent of American things to unprecedented magnificences, an ascent so automatic that indeed one needn't bother in the slightest to keep the whole thing going. For example, consider this, last year's last-word in ocean travel in which I am crossing, the Carmania with its unparalleled steadfastness, its racing, tireless great turbines, its vast population of 3244 souls! It has on the whole a tremendous effect of having come by fate and its own forces".

Ernest Shackleton returned to Liverpool from New York after his US lecture tour, travelling first class on Carmania, from 18–28 May 1910.

In June 1910 in Liverpool Carmania suffered a major fire in her passenger accommodation. Her structure and machinery were undamaged, and repairs were completed by 4 October.

On an eastbound crossing in October 1913 Carmania answered a distress signal from Volturno to pick up survivors in a storm, which resulted in many awards for gallantry being presented to various members of her crew and Captain James Clayton Barr.

In August 1914, after the outbreak of World War I, Carmania was converted into an AMC, armed with eight QF 4.7 inch Mk V naval guns. She was commissioned as HMS Carmania, with the pennant number M 55.

Commanded by Captain Noel Grant, she sailed from Liverpool to Shell Bay in Bermuda. On 14 September 1914 she engaged and sank the German merchant cruiser SMS Cap Trafalgar in the Battle of Trindade. At the time Cap Trafalgar's appearance had been altered to resemble the Carmania in order to infiltrate British fleets. Carmania suffered extensive damage and several casualties to her crew.

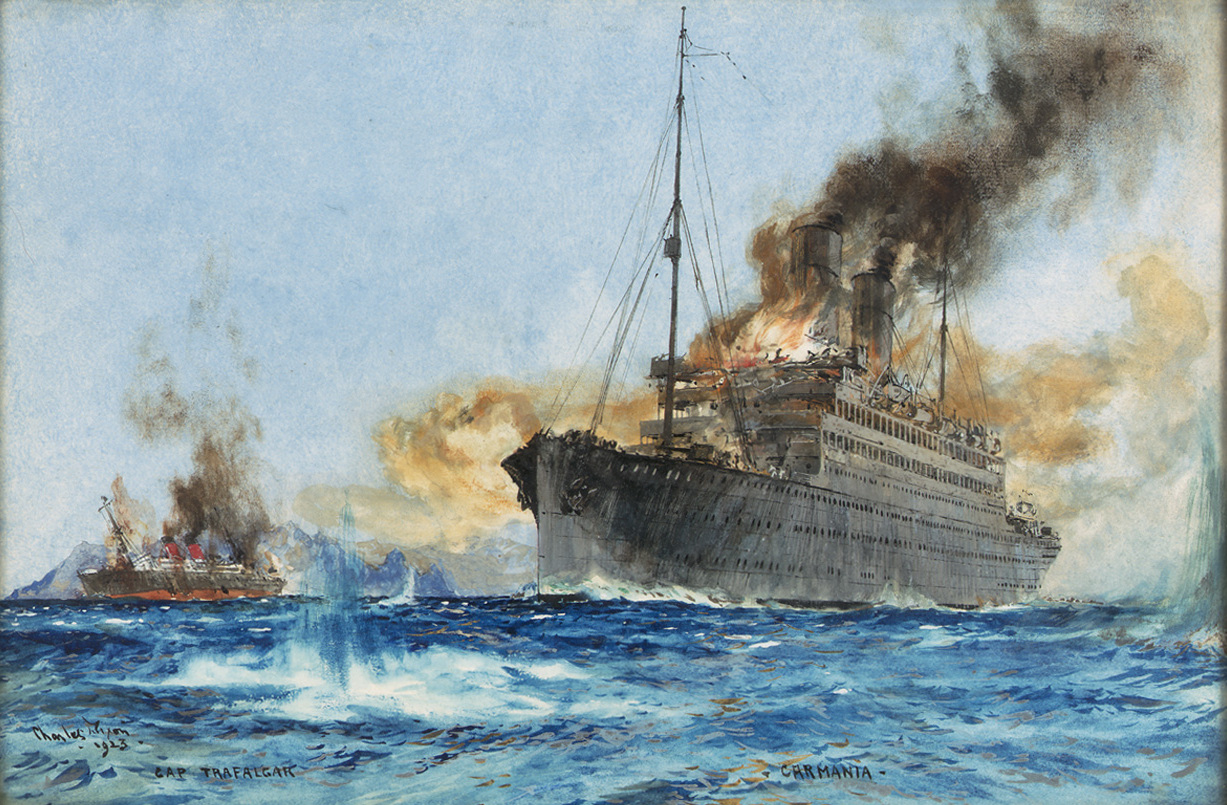
"Carmania sinking Cap Trafalgar off Trindade, September 14, 1914" by Charles Dixon

After repairs in Gibraltar, she patrolled the coast of Portugal and the Atlantic islands for the next two years. In 1916 she assisted in the Gallipoli campaign. From July 1916 she was a troop ship. After the war she took Canadian troops home from Europe.

By 1919 she had returned to passenger liner service. In 1923 Cunard had her refitted as a cabin class ship, with her total accommodation reduced from 2,650 berths to 1,440. Caronia was similarly refitted, and the two sisters kept busy until the shipping slump caused by the Great Depression after 1929. By 1930 Carmania's navigational equipment included submarine signalling and wireless direction finding.

== Fate ==
Toward the end of 1931 Cunard listed both Carmania and Caronia for sale. In 1932 Hughes Bolckow & Co. bought her for scrap. She arrived at Blyth on 22 April to be broken up.

Carmania's bell is on display aboard the permanently moored HMS Wellington at Victoria Embankment, London.

== Bibliography ==
- Osborne, Richard; Spong, Harry & Grover, Tom (2007). Armed Merchant Cruisers 1878–1945. Windsor: World Warship Society. ISBN 978-0-9543310-8-5.
- Wilson, RM (1956). The Big Ships. London: Cassell & Co.
