= Alfred Dixon (artist) =

British artist (1842–1919)

- Born: 1842; London, United Kingdom of Great Britain and Ireland
- Died: 1919 (aged 76–77); London
- Known for: Painting
- Style: Genre art
- Children: Charles Dixon

Alfred Dixon (1842 – 1919) was a British painter during the Victorian era. He mostly painted portraits of everyday life.

== Life ==
Alfred Dixon was born in London in 1842. He pursued a career in the arts, eventually becoming a well established painter in the area. He had four sons, including Alfred Dixon, Etty Dixon, James Dixon and Charles Dixon, who was born in 1872, and would later go on to become a maritime painter. Alfred Dixon would die in the year 1919, at the age of 76 or 77. As of 2024, his paintings have gone up for auction 23 times, primarily in the United Kingdom.
