= Plastistone =

Rocks and plastic fused together

Plastistone is the umbrella term for rocks that have fused with plastic. At the end of 2023 there were numerous sightings of green-colored plastic seemingly melted to rocks. It forms from plastic that floats through the ocean and melts to the rocks over time. So far, the stone has appeared on 5 continents. It was seen in March 2023 on the Brazilian remote island of Trindade and was seen in Hawaii a decade before.
