= Trindade and Martim Vaz =

Archipelago in Brazil

Trindade and Martim Vaz Archipelago
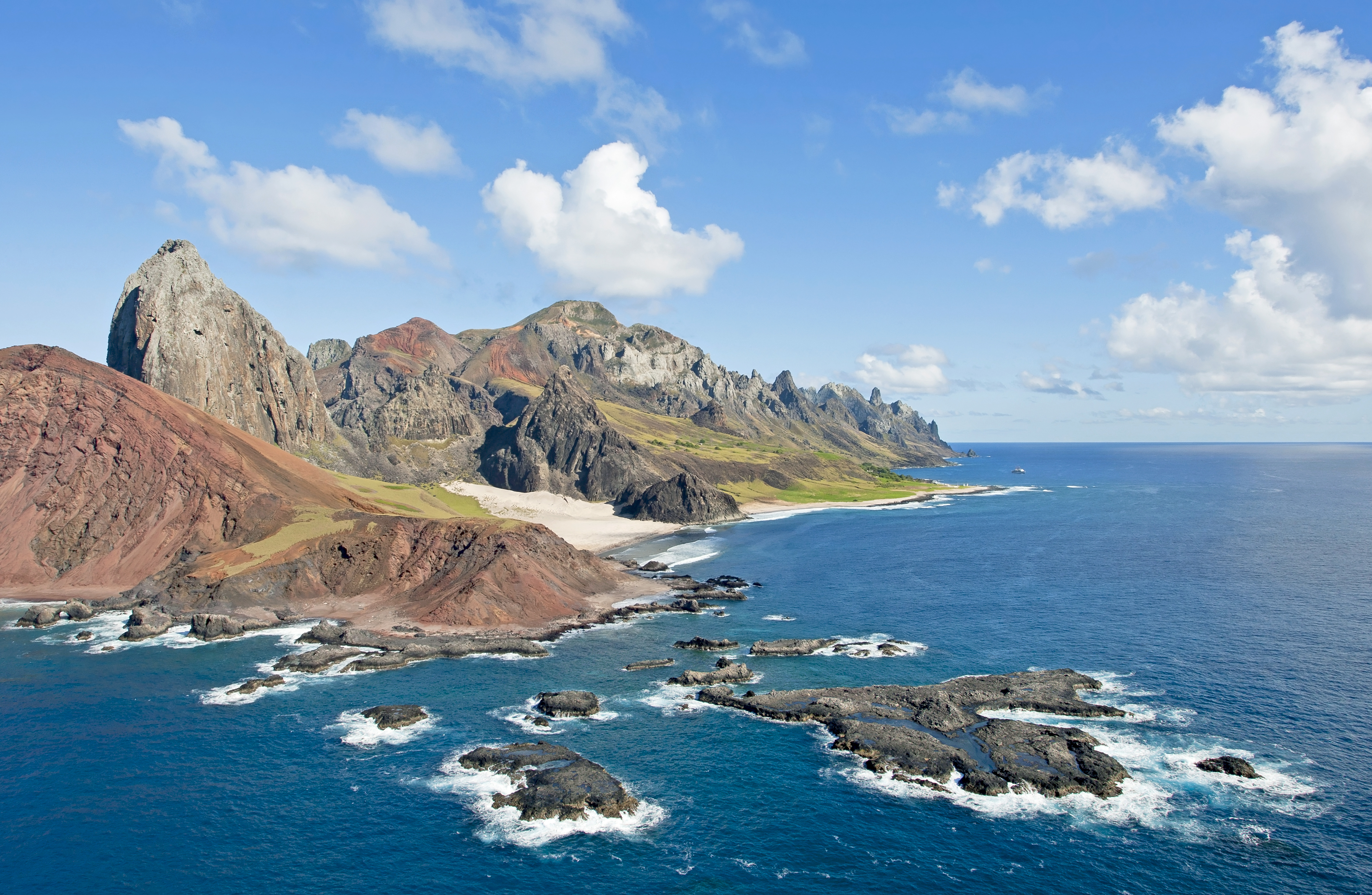
- Rocky cliffs of Trindade Island

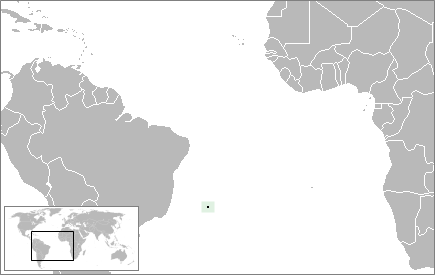

Geography
- Location: Atlantic Ocean
- Coordinates: 20°31′30″S 29°19′30″W
- Archipelago: Arquipélago de Trindade e Martim Vaz
- Total islands: 5
- Major islands: Trindade; Martim Vaz
- Area: 10.4 km^{2} (4.0 sq mi)
- Highest elevation: 620 m (2030 ft)
- Highest point: Pico do Desejado

Administration
- Brazil
- Region: Southeast
- State: Espírito Santo
- Administration: 1st Naval District of the Brazilian Navy

Demographics
- Population: Research station for up to 8 people

Additional information
- Time zone: Fernando de Noronha time (UTC-02:00)
- Official website: Brazilian Navy First Naval District

Trindade and Martim Vaz (Portuguese: Trindade e Martim Vaz, pronounced [tɾĩˈdadʒi i maʁˈtʃĩ ˈvas]) is an archipelago located in the South Atlantic Ocean about 1,100 kilometres (680 miles) east off the coast of the Brazilian state of Espírito Santo, of which it forms a part. The archipelago has a total area of 10.4 square kilometres (4.0 square miles) and a navy-supported research station of up to eight people. The archipelago consists of five islands and several rocks and stacks; Trindade is the largest island, with an area of 10.1 square kilometres (3.9 square miles); about 49 kilometres (30 miles) east of it are the Martim Vaz islets, with a total area of 0.3 square kilometres (70 acres).

The islands are of volcanic origin and have rugged terrain; the date of last eruption in the island is unknown, but occurred on the southeastern tip of the island at Vulcão de Paredão. They are largely barren, except for the southern part of Trindade. They were discovered in 1502 by Portuguese explorer Estêvão da Gama and stayed Portuguese until they became part of Brazil at its independence in 1822. From 1895 to 1896, Trindade was occupied by the United Kingdom until an agreement with Brazil was reached. During the period of British occupation, Trindade was known as South Trinidad.

The islands are situated some 2,100 kilometres (1,300 miles) southwest of Ascension Island and 2,550 kilometres (1,580 miles) west of Saint Helena, and the distance to the west coast of Africa is 4,270 kilometres (2,650 miles).

Due to the introduction of invasive species, such as sheep, the island's biodiversity has heavily deteriorated since the second half of the 20th century, with many indigenous species having become endangered.

== Geography ==
The archipelago consists of Ilha da Trindade (Portuguese for "Trinity Island") and the Ilhas de Martim Vaz. The largest of the second group is Ilha da Racha ("Crack Island") or Ilha Martim Vaz, 175 metres (574 feet) high near the northwest end. The shores are strewn with boulders.

Ilha do Norte ("North Island") lies 300 metres (980 feet) north-northwest of Ilha da Racha, and is 75 metres (246 feet) high. Rochedo da Agulha ("Needle Rock") is a 60 metres (200 feet) high circular rock 200 metres (660 feet) northwest of Ilha da Racha. Ilha do Sul ("South Island"), 1,600 metres (5,200 feet) south of Ilha da Racha, is a rocky pinnacle. Ilha do Sul is the easternmost point of Brazil.

=== Trindade ===
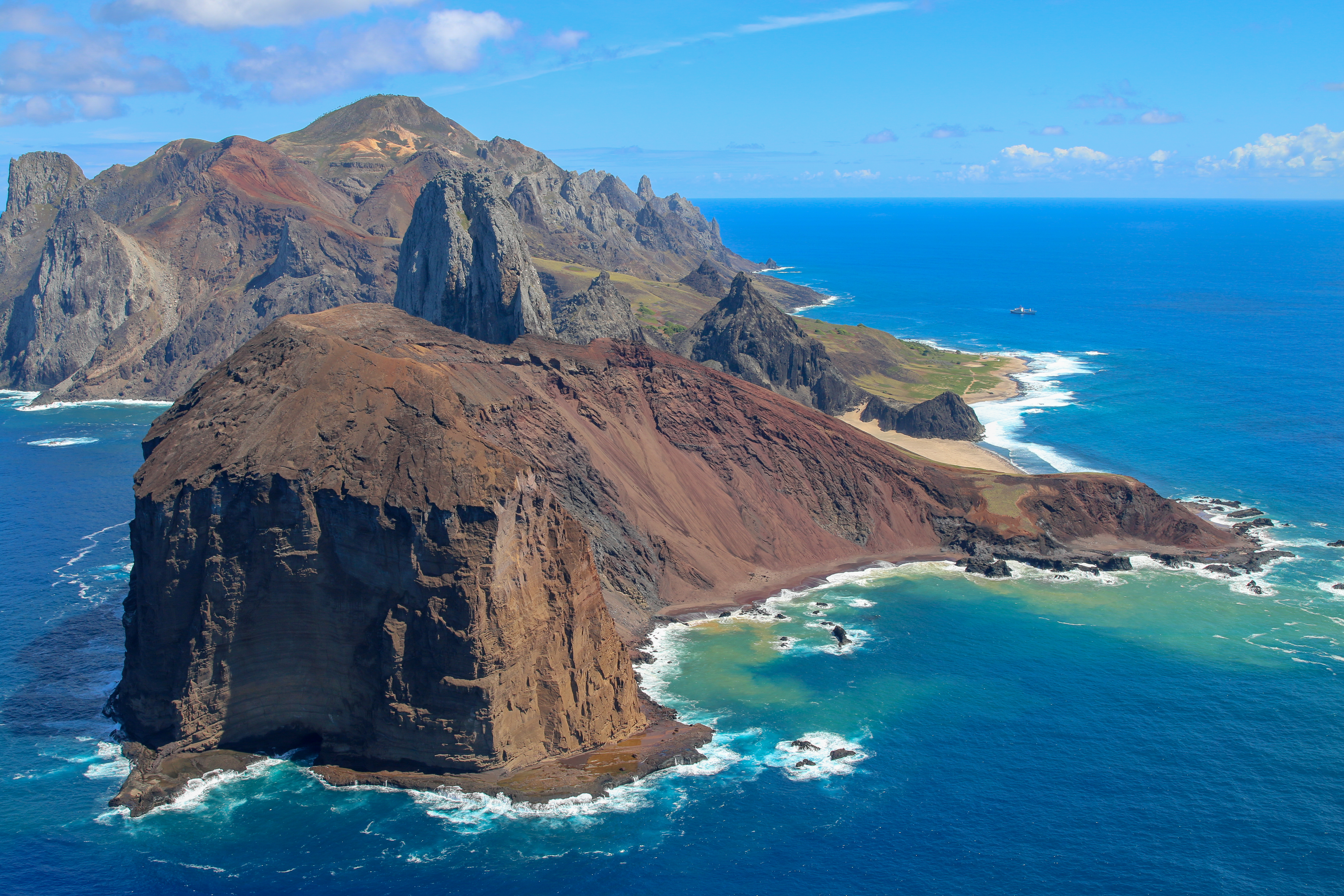
Trindade Island from the air

Trindade is a mountainous, desiccated volcanic island. The highest summit is Pico Desejado, near the center, 620 metres (2,030 feet) high. Nearby to the northwest are Pico da Trindade (590 m (1,940 ft)) and Pico Bonifácio (570 m (1,870 ft)). Pico Monumento, a remarkable peak in the form of a slightly inclined cylinder, rises from the west coast to 270 m (890 ft). Until around 1850, between 75 and 85% of the island was covered by a forest of Colubrina glandulosa trees, 15m in height and 40 cm trunk diameter. The introduction of non-native animals (like goats, pigs, sheep, etc.), and the indiscriminate cutting of trees, led to total extirpation of the forest, causing heavy erosion on the island, with a loss of about 1 to 2 meters of fertile soils. The effect of this devastation impaired the flow of water streams, with the depletion of several springs.

There is a small settlement in the north on the shore of a cove called Enseada dos Portugueses, supporting a 32-strong garrison of the Brazilian Navy.

The archipelago is the main nesting site of the green sea turtle in Brazil. There are also large numbers of breeding seabirds, including the endemic subspecies of the Great frigatebird (Fregata minor nicolli) and Lesser frigatebird (F. ariel trinitatis), and it is the only Atlantic breeding site for the Trindade petrel. Humpback whales have been confirmed to use the Trindade island as a nursery.

== History ==
=== 16th to 18th century ===
The Trindade and Martim Vaz Islands were discovered in 1502 by Portuguese navigators led by Estêvão da Gama, and along with Brazil, became part of the Portuguese Empire.

Many visitors have been to Martim Vaz, the most famous of whom was the English astronomer Edmund Halley, who took possession of the island on behalf of the British Monarchy in 1700. Wild goats and hogs, descendants of ones set free by Halley, were still found on Martim Vaz in 1939.

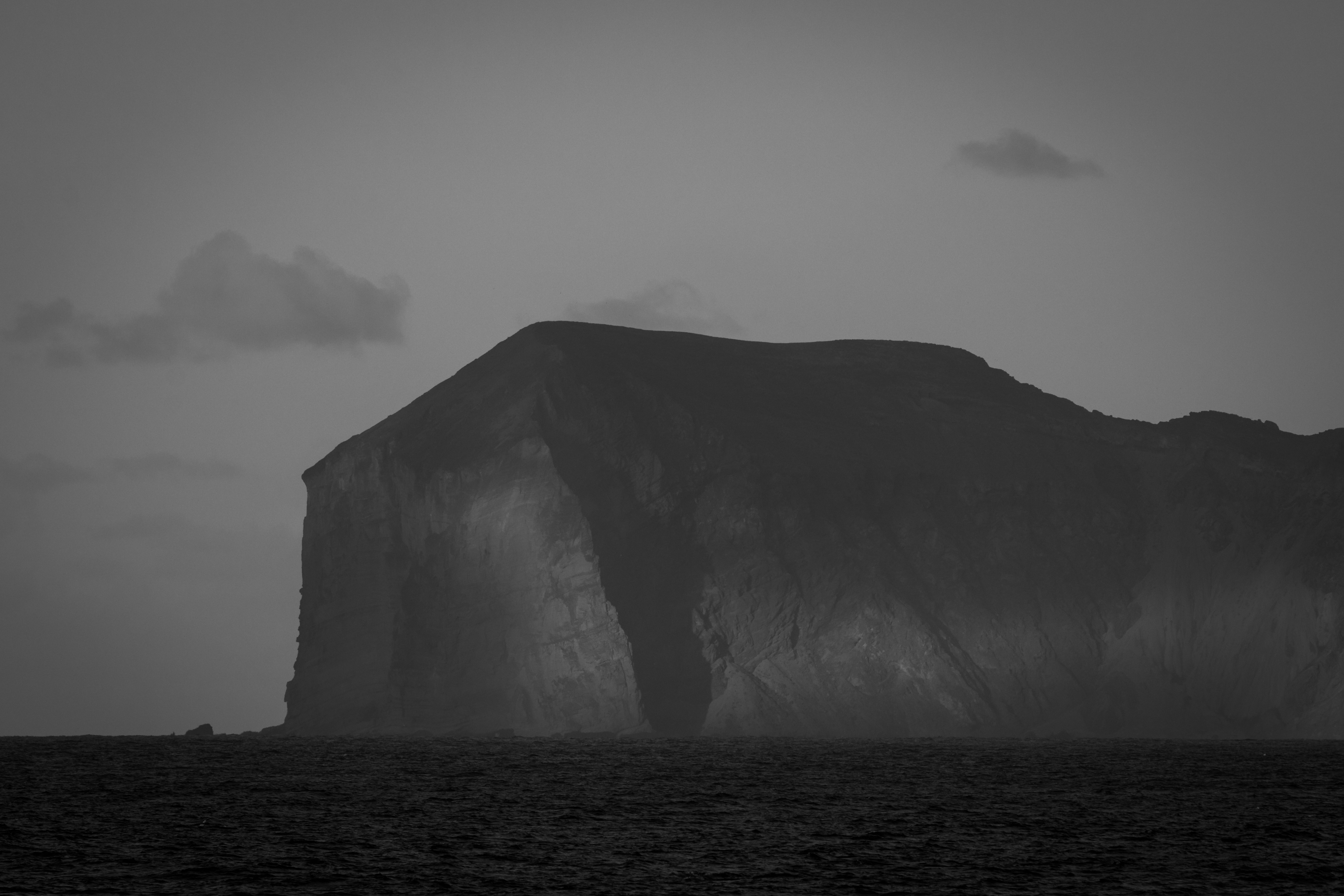
Cliffs on the island

HMS Rattlesnake, a 198-ton, 12-gun cutter-rigged sloop, was wrecked on Trindade on 21 October 1781, shortly after Commander Philippe d'Auvergne had taken over command. Rattlesnake had been ordered to survey the island to ascertain whether it would make a useful base for outward-bound Indiamen. She anchored, but that evening the wind increased and by seven o’clock she was dragging. Two hours later the first cable parted and Commander d’Auvergne club-hauled his way out, setting main and fore sails, and using the remaining anchor cable as a spring. This successfully put Rattlesnake’s head to seaward. The remaining cable was then cut, and the sloop wore round and stood out to sea. However the ground now shallowed quite rapidly and suddenly Rattlesnake struck a submerged rock. She started filling with water, so, in order to preserve the lives of the crew, d'Auvergne ran her ashore. Commodore Johnstone on board HMS Jupiter had previously wished to colonise the island and claim it for Britain, so d'Auvergne agreed to stay on the tiny island with 30 sailors, 20 captured French sailors, one French woman, some animals and supplies. They were resupplied by another ship in January 1782, then they appear to have been forgotten, as they lived on the tiny island for a year until HMS Bristol and a convoy of Indiamen, which fortuitously called there, rescued them in late December 1782.

Johnstone had made a naval base in Trindade, so Portugal reacted. They sent the 64-gun Nossa Senhora dos Prazeres, commanded by Captain of sea and war José de Melo, with 150 soldiers and artillery, but the British had already abandoned the Island.

French Navy officer and explorer La Pérouse stopped there at the outset of his renowned 1785 voyage to the Pacific.

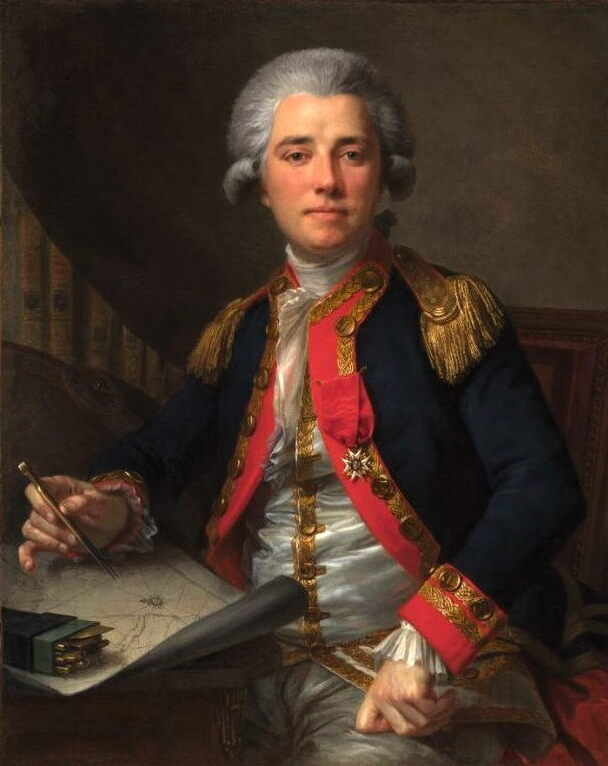
1778 portrait of French French Navy officer and explorer La Pérouse by Geneviève Brossard de Beaulieu

=== 19th to 20th century ===
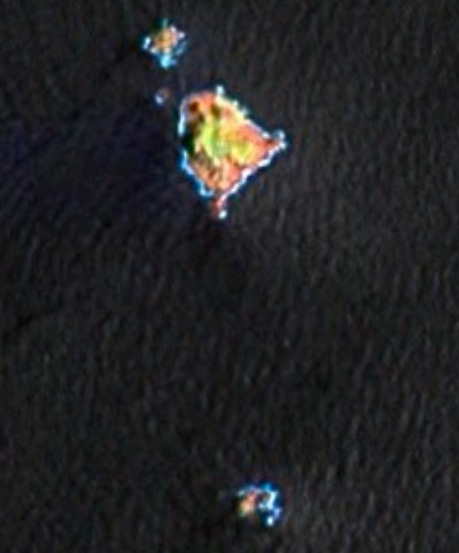
NASA satellite imagery of Martim Vaz Islands in pseudo-color

In 1839, the Ross expedition made a brief stop on Trindade, as chronicled by Robert McCormick. He described Pico Monumento as the "Nine Pin Rock".

In 1889, Edward Frederick Knight went treasure hunting on the island. He was unsuccessful but he wrote a detailed description of the island and his expedition, titled The Cruise of the Alerte.

In 1893 another Franco-American, James Harden-Hickey, claimed the island and declared himself as James I, Prince of Trinidad. According to James Harden-Hickey's plans, Trinidad, after being recognized as an independent country, would become a military dictatorship and have him as dictator. He designed postage stamps, a national flag, and a coat of arms; established a chivalric order, the "Cross of Trinidad"; bought a schooner to transport colonists; appointed M. le Comte de la Boissiere as secretary of state; opened a consular office at 217 West 36th Street in New York City; and even issued government bonds to finance construction of infrastructure on the island. Despite his plans, his idea was ridiculed or ignored by the world.

In July 1895, the British again tried to take possession of this strategic position in the Atlantic. The British planned to use the island as a cable station. However, Brazilian diplomatic efforts, along with permission from Portugal, reinstated Trindade Island to Brazilian sovereignty.

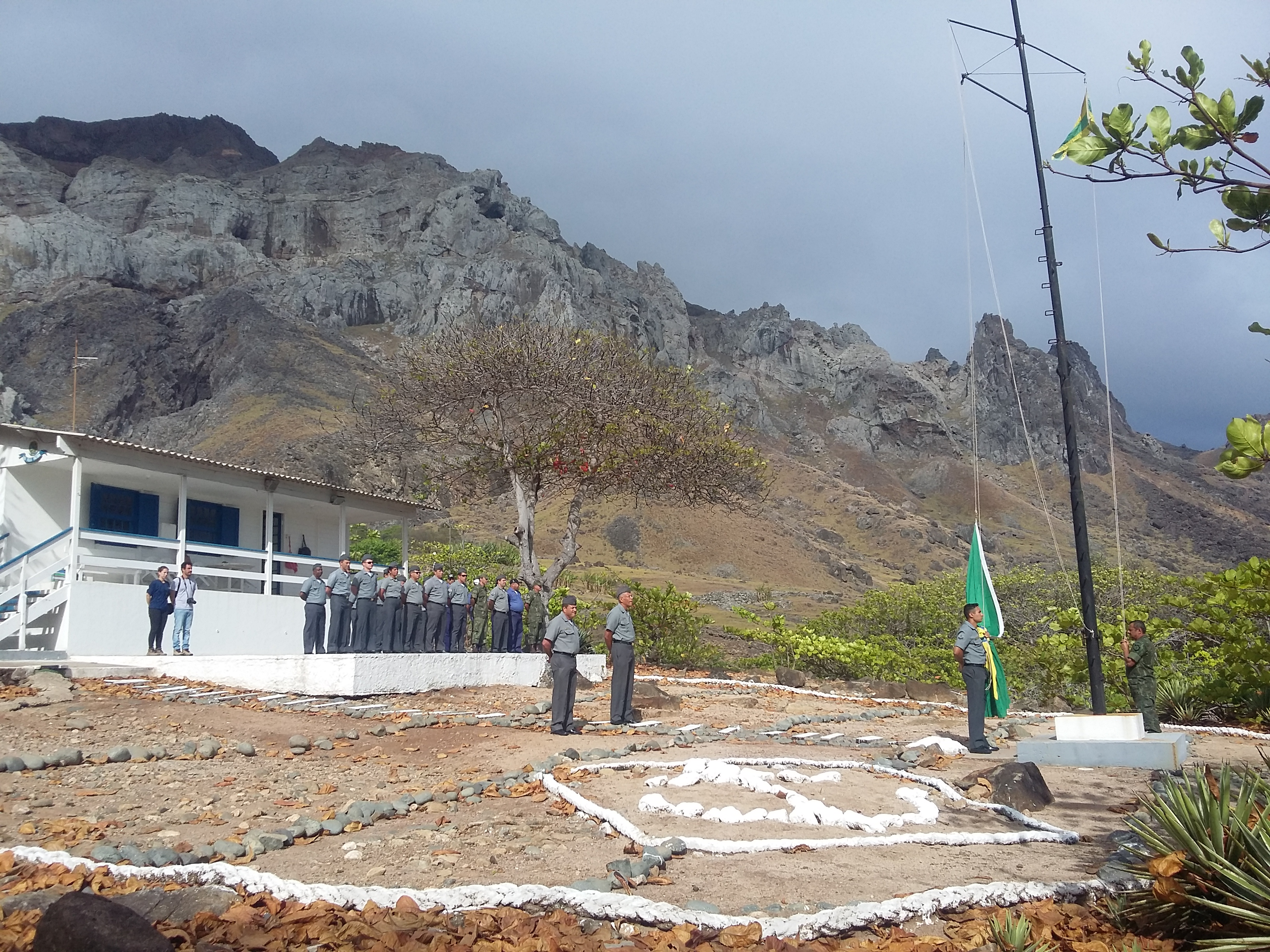
Raising the Brazilian flag on the island

In order to clearly demonstrate sovereignty over the island, now part of the State of Espírito Santo and the municipality of Vitória, a landmark was built on 24 January 1897. Nowadays, Brazilian presence is marked by a permanent Brazilian Navy base on the main island.

In July 1910 the ship Terra Nova carrying the last expedition of Captain Robert Falcon Scott to the Antarctic arrived at the island, at the time uninhabited. Some members of Scott's expedition explored the island with scientific purposes, and a description of it is included in The Worst Journey in the World, by Apsley Cherry-Garrard, one of the members of the expedition.

In August 1914, the Imperial German Navy established a supply base for its warships off Trindade. On 14 September 1914, the Royal Navy auxiliary cruiser HMS Carmania fought the German SMS Cap Trafalgar off Trindade in the Battle of Trindade. Carmania sank Cap Trafalgar, but sustained severe damage herself.

=== 21st century ===
Trindade was a port passing mark for the 2022 Golden Globe Race, a single-handed round-the-world yacht race. In March 2023, plastic rocks called plastistone were found on Trindade.

== See also ==
- Trindade hotspot
