= Guion Line =

British shipping line

- The company's house flag
- Industry: Transport
- Founded: 1866
- Fate: Liquidated, 1894

The Liverpool and Great Western Steamship Company, known commonly as the Guion Line, was a British passenger service that operated the Liverpool-Queenstown-New York route from 1866 to 1894. While incorporated in Great Britain, 52% of the company's capital was from the American firm, Williams and Guion of New York. Known primarily for transporting immigrants, in 1879 the line started commissioning Blue Riband record breakers to compete against Cunard, White Star and Inman for first class passengers. The financial troubles of one of the company's major partners in 1884 forced the firm to return its latest record breaker, the Oregon, to her builders and focus again on the immigrant trade. The company suspended sailings in 1894 because of new American restrictions on immigrant traffic.

== History ==
=== Steerage trade ===
In 1848, John Stanton Williams (c. 1810–1876) and Stephen Barker Guion (1820-1885) formed the New York firm of Williams and Guion to operate the Black Star Line of sailing packets on the Liverpool-Queenstown-New York route. In 1852, Guion relocated to Liverpool as the firm's agent while Williams remained in New York. The next year, Guion's older brother, William H. Guion joined the firm's New York office. The Black Star Line concentrated on the steerage trade and ultimately owned 18 sailing ships. Black Star was shut down in 1863 because of the success of iron-screw liners in attracting steerage passengers and the danger of Confederate commerce raiders during the Civil War. Stephen Guion, by now a naturalized British citizen, contracted with the Cunard Line and the National Line to provide steerage passengers.

In 1866, Stephen Guion incorporated the Liverpool and Great Western Steamship Company in Great Britain to operate a quartet of 2,900 GRT liners for a weekly service to New York. Although 52% of the capital came from the Williams and Guion partnership, the Guion Line was formed as a British company because American law only allowed U.S.-built ships to be registered in the U.S., and American shipyards were incapable at that time of building the iron-hulled screw steamers required to compete on this route. Guion took advantage of an 1846 legal decision that considered a British corporation as a British citizen even if its shareholders were largely foreigners.

By 1870, the Guion Line ranked third in the delivery of immigrants to New York, with 27,054 steerage passengers, but only 1,115 first class. The line's eight ships were known as good sea-boats and had a reputation for innovative engineering. Guion's Wisconsin and Wyoming were the first liners on the Atlantic built with compound engines. Unfortunately, Guion's ships also had a reputation for being slow. In 1873, the New York Times urged the U.S. Post Office to contract with another line because of the long passage times of Guion ships.

=== Ocean greyhounds ===
Arizona's bow after her 1879 collision with an iceberg.

The five-year shipping depression beginning in 1873 changed the character of the Guion Line. By 1875, the fleet was reduced to the four newest ships. The directors decided that they needed record breakers to change the company's image and ordered two 17 knot steamers, the Montana and the Dakota, to win the Blue Riband. However, both ships proved to be major failures and only achieved 11.5 knots in service. In 1877, Dakota became a total loss after stranding off Anglesey, and in 1880 Montana was lost after she also stranded only a few miles away from her sister. Guion purchased Cunard's ten-year-old Abyssinia to take her place in the schedule.

William Pearce, the controlling partner of the John Elder shipyard, was convinced that a crack steamer that carried only passengers and light freight could be profitable because she would attract more passengers and spend less time in port. He proposed a ship that crammed the most powerful machinery possible into the hull, sacrificing everything to speed. When Cunard rejected his proposal, Pearce offered his idea to Guion at a bargain price of £140,000 at a time when express liners typically cost £200,000. He also agreed to share the initial costs. Financially stressed after a series of shipwrecks, Guion was pleased with the arrangement. Stephen Guion personally owned the new vessel.

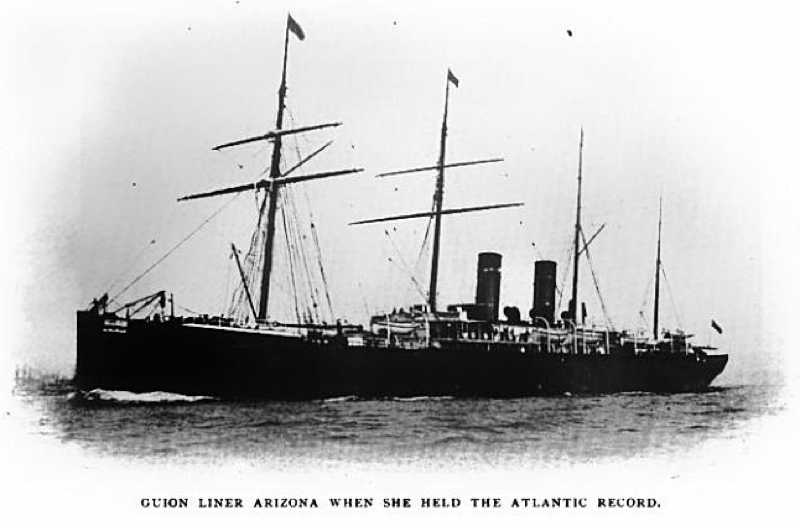
Liner Arizona when she held Atlantic Record.

Alaska of 1881 finally won the Blue Riband for the Guion Line.

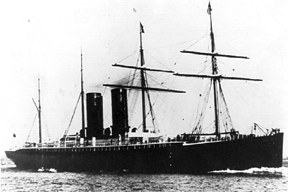
The Blue Riband winner Oregon of 1883 was sold to Cunard after only a few voyages for Guion.

Guion's 16-knot Arizona took the eastbound record, but not the Blue Riband (i.e. the westbound record). Arizona also won considerable publicity when on an early voyage she hit an iceberg head-on, telescoping 25 feet of her bow. She returned to St. John's, where a temporary wooden bow was fitted until permanent repairs were made in Scotland. Guion advertised this incident as proof of the ship's strength.

Two years later, Guion took delivery of an even faster Blue Riband winner, the 17-knot Alaska, also personally owned by Guion. To continue the program, Pearce offered Guion favorable terms on a third unit, the 18-knot Oregon of 1883. While these ships were uncomfortable, they proved popular with American clients because of their American ownership.

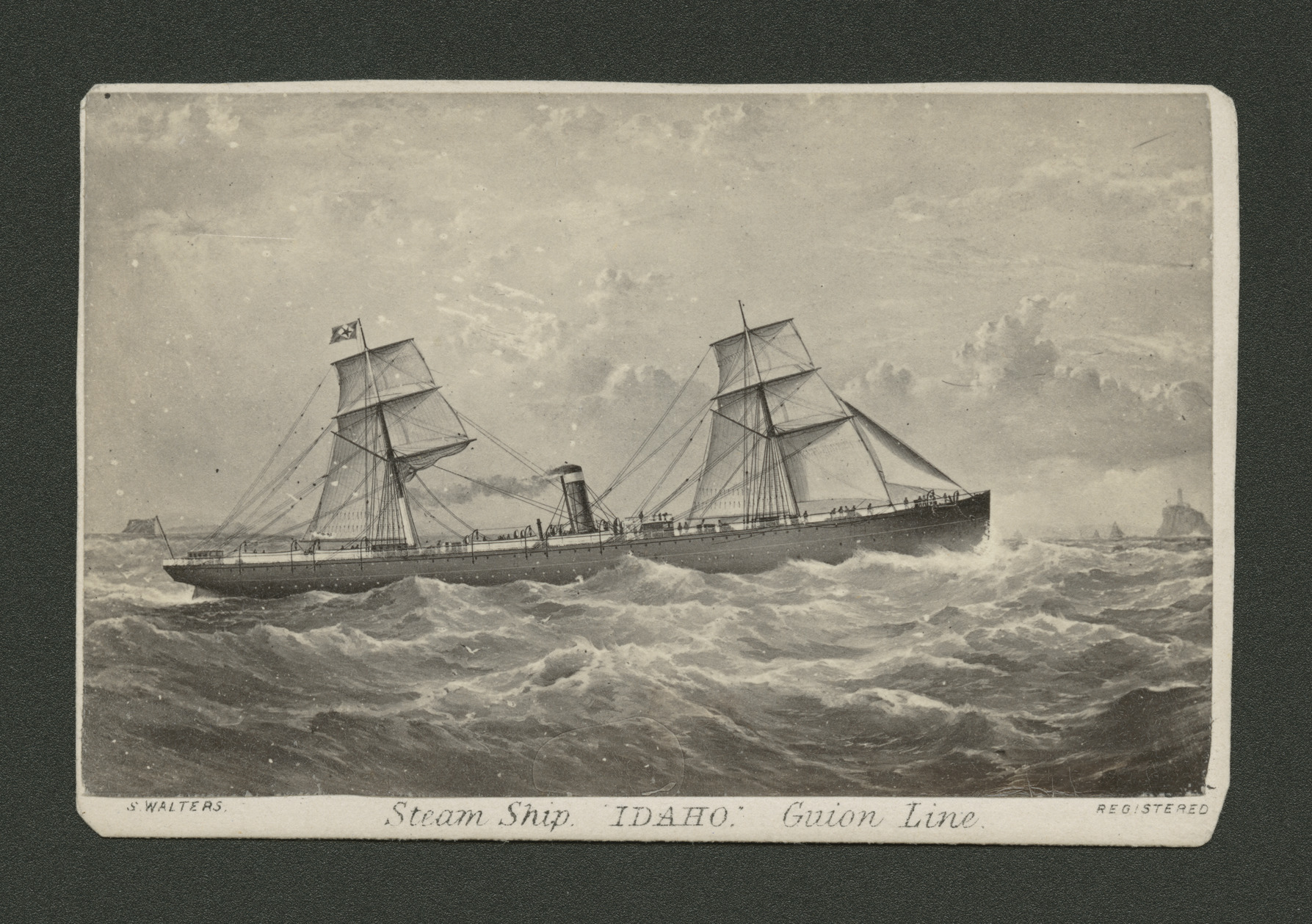
Steam Ship Idaho in 1874.

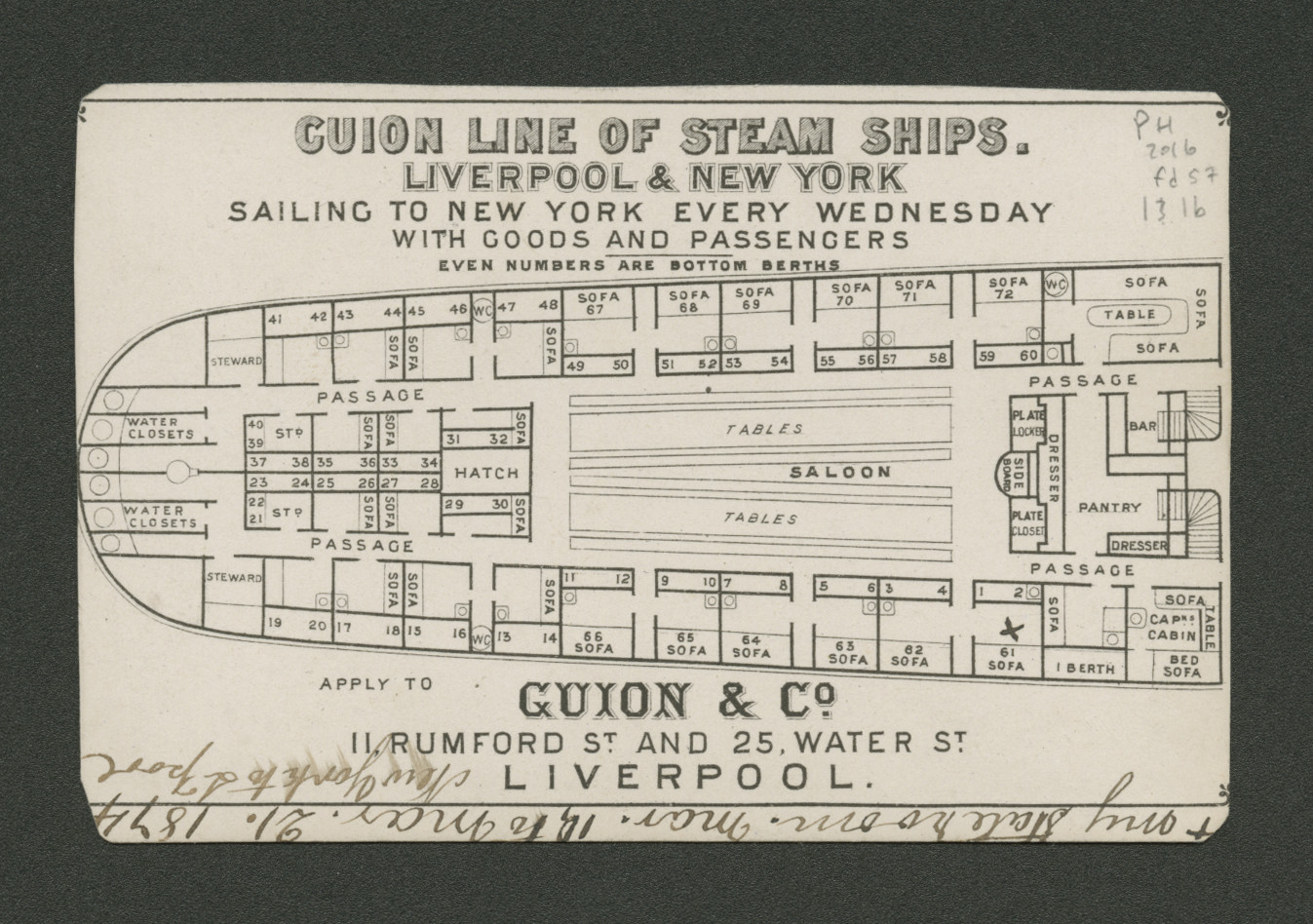
Living Quarters of the Steam Ship Idaho

In 1876, John Williams died and the firm was restructured in 1883 to settle his estate. Then in January 1884, Stephen Guion's older brother, William, resigned from the firm because of bad investments unrelated to the steamship line. Unable to make payments to the shipbuilder, Stephen Guion returned the current Blue Riband holder, Oregon, to the Elders, who sold her to Cunard. Stephen himself died in December 1885, and his 37-year-old nephew, William H. Guion Jr., died a month later, forcing a liquidation of the now named Guion and Company. The line was reorganized as a public stock corporation to settle the estates.

=== Final chapter ===
The new directors, chaired by Sir William Pearce himself, continued a weekly schedule with the old Nevada, Wisconsin and Wyoming along with the relatively new Arizona and Alaska, while Abyssinia was put on long-term charter to the Canadian Pacific Line. In 1886, the line was granted a share of the British transatlantic mail contract. However, the company's reputation was hurt in 1891 when the recently returned Abyssinia burned at sea, fortunately without loss of life. In 1892, the cholera scare caused New York officials to quarantine vessels arriving with steerage passengers. The Wyoming was one of the ships detained and a crewman on the ship died of cholera. Immigration regulation was taken over by the Federal Government and steamship lines were made responsible for returning any immigrants found unfit. In December 1892, Guion directors decided to retire the three oldest steamers, which were primarily in the steerage trade. In 1894, outpaced by the latest twin-screw liners from Cunard, White Star and Inman, the directors also withdrew the two former record breakers and liquidated the remaining assets.

== Guion fleet ==
All built for Guion unless otherwise indicated—presented in order of acquisition.

Ship	Built	In service for Guion	Type	Tonnage	Notes
Manhattan	1866	1866-1875	intermediate	2,900	Sold to Warren Line 1875
Chicago	1866	1866-1868	intermediate	2,900	Wrecked near Queenstown, Southern Ireland in 1868 with no loss of life
Minnesota	1867	1867-1875	intermediate	2,900	sold to Warren Line 1875
Nebraska	1867	1867-1874	intermediate	3,900	sold 1874
Colorado	1868	1868-1872	intermediate	2,900	Sunk in Mersey 1872 with 6 lost
Nevada	1869	1869-1893	intermediate	3,150	sold to Dominion Line. A notable passenger was Annie Moore, from Ireland, the first passenger to cross the threshold of Ellis Island in January 1892.
Idaho	1869	1869-1878	intermediate	3,150	Wrecked near Queenstown, Southern Ireland on 1 June 1878 with no loss of life
Wisconsin	1870	1870-1893	intermediate	3,250	sold 1893
Wyoming	1870	1870-1893	intermediate	3,250	sold 1893
Montana	1875	1875-1880	intermediate	4,300	Wrecked off Anglesey on 14 March 1880 with no loss of life
Dakota	1875	1875-1877	intermediate	4,300	Wrecked off Anglesey on 9 May 1877 with no loss of life
Arizona	1879	1879-1894	express	5,150	Eastbound record holder, sold 1898 to the U.S. Government
Abyssinia	1870	1880-1891	express	3,250	Purchased from Cunard, burned at sea 1891 with no loss of life
Alaska	1881	1881-1894	express	6,950	Blue Riband, sold 1899
Oregon	1883	1883-1884	express	7,400	Blue Riband, returned to builder and resold to Cunard 1884, sunk 1886, 1 died
Parthia	1870	1885-1887	intermediate	3,200	Purchased from Cunard, sold in 1892 to the North American Mail Steamship Company as Victoria.
