= SS Oregon (1883) =

Ship

Coordinates: 40.5167°N 71.7333°W

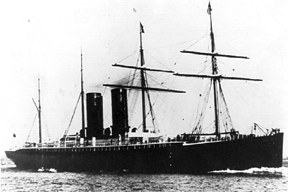
- Guion's Oregon of 1883

History

United Kingdom
- Name: Oregon
- Namesake: Oregon
- Operator: 1883–1884 Guion Line; 1884–1886 Cunard Line
- Builder: John Elder & Company, in Govan, Scotland
- Launched: 23 June 1883
- In service: 1883
- Out of service: 1886
- Fate: Sank in 1886 after a collision with a schooner 18 nautical miles (33 km) South of Long Island, New York

General characteristics
- Class & type: Steam passenger ship
- Tonnage: 7,375 GRT
- Length: 521 ft (159 m)
- Beam: 54 ft (16 m)
- Propulsion: Compound steam engine geared to single screw
- Sail plan: Four masts with emergency sails
- Speed: 18 knots (33 km/h; 21 mph)
- Capacity: 1,432 passengers in three classes

SS Oregon was a record-breaking British passenger liner that won the Blue Riband for the Guion Line as the fastest liner on the Atlantic in 1884. She was sold to the Cunard Line after a few voyages and continued to improve her passage times for her new owner. In 1885, Oregon was chartered to the Royal Navy as an auxiliary cruiser, and her success in this role resulted in the Admiralty subsidizing suitable ships for quick conversion in the event of a crisis. She returned to Cunard service in November 1885 and four months later collided with a schooner while approaching New York. Virtually all persons on board were rescued before Oregon sank. Her wreck, 18 miles south of Long Island, remains a popular diving site.

== Development and design ==
Arizona and Alaska only allowed the Guion Line to schedule fortnightly sailings with express liners in each direction. On alternate weeks, Guion's sailings used ships that were considerably slower. Guion needed two additional ships for a balanced weekly service. When Cunard started to build a new fleet for its weekly Liverpool – New York express service, Guion Line ordered Oregon to retain the Atlantic records won by Alaska. As with her predecessors, Oregon was built at the Fairfield Yard of John Elder & Company of Glasgow, Scotland, and cost $1,250,000.

Oregon was 6.5% larger and four feet (1.2 m) wider than Alaska, but the same length to reduce her ratio of length to beam and address the serious vibration problem experienced by Arizona and Alaska. Consideration was given to building Oregon of steel after the fiasco of City of Rome, but the new metal was still expensive and hard to obtain. Oregon was the last iron record breaker. She had nine transverse watertight bulkheads, five iron decks, and a strong turtle-back deck forward and aft as a protection from the heavy seas.

The compound steam engine built for Oregon had a 70-inch-diameter (1,800 mm) high-pressure cylinder flanked by two 104-inch-diameter (2,600 mm) low-pressure cylinders. The engine generated 12,500 indicated horsepower as compared to 8,300 for Alaska. Steam was generated from nine Fox patent double-ended boilers, each 16 3/4 feet long and 16 1/2 feet in diameter. Daily coal consumption was 300 tons, an increase of 50 tons compared to Alaska and 165 tons over Arizona. The screw propeller was twenty-four feet in diameter with a shaft that consisted of fifteen separate parts made of crucible steel.

Oregon was fitted for 340 saloon, 92 second-class, and 1,000 steerage passengers. Passengers traveling saloon or cabin were equivalent to first class today. On Oregon, steerage had been upgraded to third class and given assigned berths in small rooms rather than dormitories.

The main public room, the grand saloon was in the forepart of the ship and described at the time as "capable of dining the whole of the 340 cabin passengers." "The ceiling decorations were almost exclusively confined to white and gold. The panels were of polished satinwood, the pilasters of walnut, with gilt capitals. The saloon measured 65 by 54 feet, and was 9 feet high in the lowest part. A central cupola of handsome design, 25 feet long and 15 feet wide, rose to a height of 20 feet, and gave abundant light and ventilation." "The staterooms are large and well lighted and ventilated. Every facility for comfort is provided in the cabin. The ladies' drawing room is furnished in a costly manner, and is on the promenade deck. The latter extends nearly the entire length of the vessel. The wood work of the ladies' drawing room, the Captain's cabin, and the principal entrance to the saloons came from the State of Oregon. On the upper deck near the entrance of the grand saloon was the smoking room, which is paneled in Spanish mahogany and has a mosaic floor."

The Oregon had dynamos and incandescent electric lamps supplied by the Edison Company, which were used in lighting the vessel. In 1884 the dynamos became badly damaged and were repaired by an engineer from the Edison Machine Works, Nikola Tesla, who had just transferred from Edison's European company. Tesla stayed up all night getting the dynamos back in order and received a compliment from Edison the next morning.

== Service history ==
Oregon sailed on her maiden voyage in October 1883 and was gradually broken in before attempting Alaska's records. On 5 April 1884, she won the eastbound record with a New York – Queenstown run of 7 days, 2 hours, 18 minutes (17.12 knots). On her return to New York, she also won the Blue Riband with a westbound voyage of 6 days, 10 hours, 10 minutes (18.56 knots). However, the Guion Line was in financial difficulty because in January 1884, Stephen Guion's older brother, William resigned from the firm due to bad investments unrelated to the steamship line. Unable to make payments to the shipbuilder, Stephen Guion returned Oregon to her builders. At that time, Elders was completing two liners for Cunard to beat Oregon, and Cunard took the opportunity to acquire Oregon herself. On 7 June 1884, Oregon sailed under the Cunard flag and in August, bettered her eastbound record.

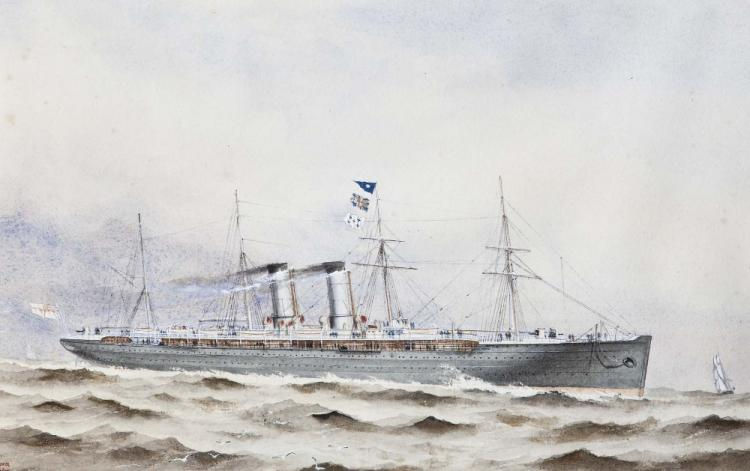
The armed merchant cruiser Oregon under way, circa 1885

In March 1885, during the Russian war scare over Afghanistan, the British Navy chartered sixteen passenger liners for conversion to auxiliary cruisers. While thirteen were converted, only Oregon and the Union Line's Moor were actually commissioned. Oregon proved successful because of her speed, and the Navy started to pay annual subsidies to passenger lines to make suitable ships available on call. When war fears abated, Oregon was returned to Cunard and on 14 November 1885, she resumed commercial sailings.

With the completion of Umbria and Etruria, Oregon was now redundant on the New York express service, and Cunard announced that she was to be transferred to the Liverpool – Boston route.

== Sinking ==
On what was supposed to be one of her last runs to New York, Oregon sailed from Liverpool on 6 March 1886 with 852 people on board, 647 passengers (186 First Class, 66 Second Class and 395 Steerage) and a crew of 205, along with 1,835 tons of cargo and 598 bags of mail, under the command of Captain Phillip Cottier. At about 04:30am on 14 March – only a few hours from her scheduled arrival in New York City (about 15 miles to the west) – she collided with an unidentified schooner, most likely Charles H. Morse, which disappeared in those waters about the same time. The schooner evidently sank almost immediately upon impact with all hands.

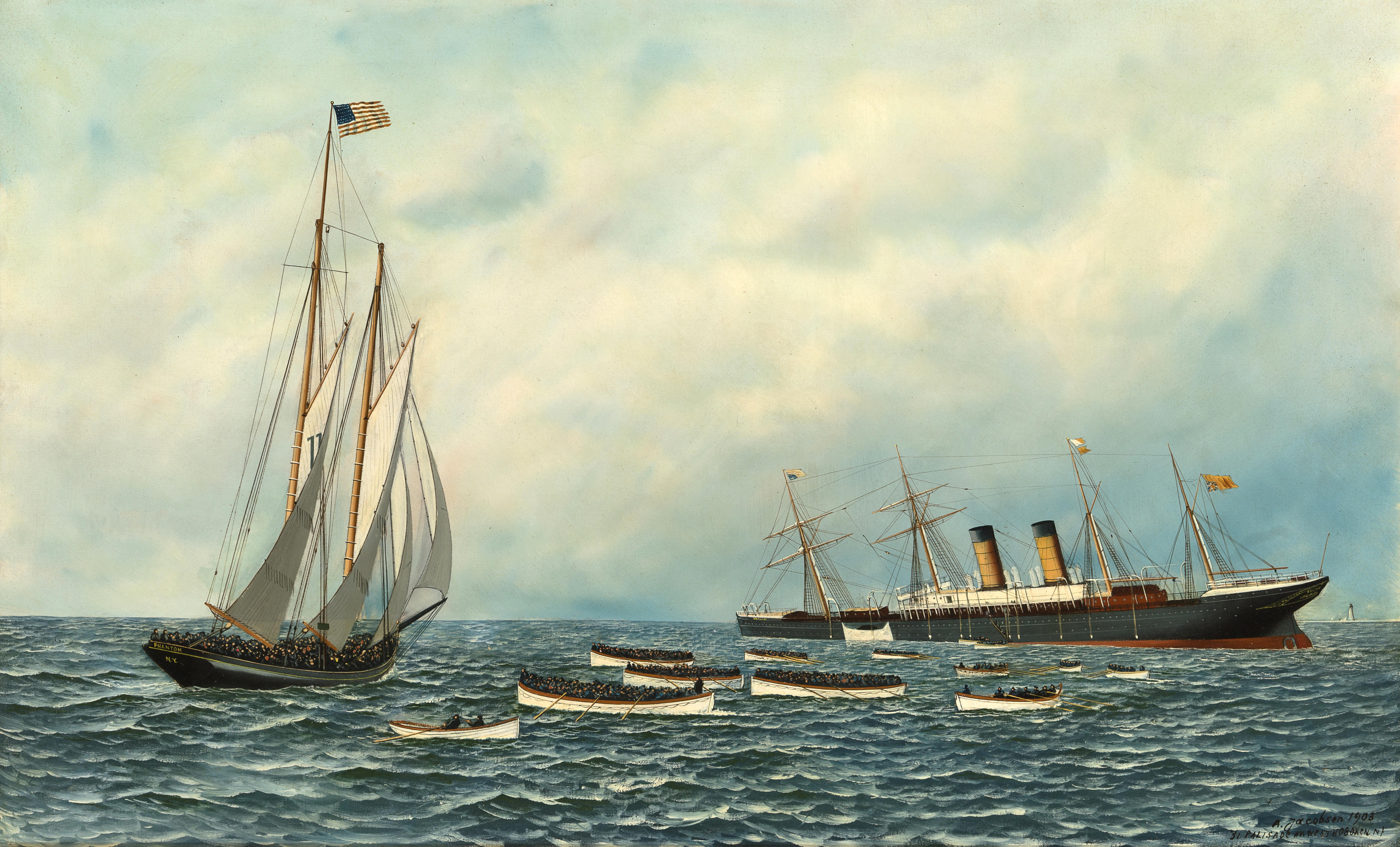
SS Oregon sinking in 1886 after collision. All hands rescued by pilot boat Phantom. Depicted in 1902 painting by Antonio Jacobsen.

The hole in Oregon's side was described by one passenger as big enough for a horse and carriage. While the chief officer, who had been on duty on the bridge at the time of the collision and had scantly seen the lights of the schooner before she plowed into the liner's side, described the collision as being merely 'a glancing blow', several passengers who had been quartered in cabins close to the point of collision described it as being a terrible crash. An unsuccessful attempt was made by the crew to plug the hole with canvas. Two hours after the collision, the captain ordered Oregon to be abandoned, but the ten lifeboats and three emergency rafts aboard Oregon only had room for half of the 852 people on board.

A woman named Mrs W.H. Hurst, who had been travelling in First Class along with her husband, was one of several passengers who later claimed that during the evacuation, a group of stokers and trimmers from the boiler rooms had tried to push ahead of the women and children to get into the lifeboats, and noted to have seen the first boat launched to be completely filled with them. She then noted that the officers in charge of the evacuation and several male passengers managed to regain order on the boat deck over these men. During the evacuation, the first-class cricketer Charles Waller fell overboard and drowned.

Finally, at 8:30 AM, the pilot boat Phantom and the schooner Fannie A. Gorham responded to Oregon's emergency flares and boarded all passengers and crew. At 10:30 AM, SS Fulda of Norddeutscher Lloyd also arrived, and the passengers and crew were transferred again. Eight hours after the collision, Oregon sank bow first in 125 feet of water. Her mast tops remained above water for several tides.

Cunard sent divers to the wreck to determine if Oregon could be salvaged. However, the hull broke open when the ship hit the bottom. The loss amounted to $3,166,000 including $1.25 million for the ship, $700,000 for her cargo, $216,000 in passenger baggage, and $1 million for currency and other valuables carried in the mails. Oregon's purser managed to save a large shipment of diamonds in the ship's safe.

Over the years, the ship's hull and iron decks have collapsed. However, the engine still stands 40 feet (12 m) above the ocean floor near the ship's nine boilers.

Records
Preceded by Alaska	Holder of the Blue Riband (Westbound record); 1884–1885	Succeeded by Etruria
Preceded by Alaska	Blue Riband (Eastbound record); 1876–1879	Succeeded by Etruria
