= William Howe Guion =

William Howe Guion I (1817–1884) headed the Williams and Guion Black Star Line.

== Biography ==
He was the son of John Guion and Maria Howe of Westchester County, New York.

William had a younger brother Stephen Barker Guion which was one of the "Williams & Guion Black Star Line" founders.

William was married and had a son, whose name was also William Howe Guion II or William Howe Guion the Second (cerca 1830–1886).

Stephen Barker Guion passed through the Atlantic Ocean to Liverpool in 1852 where he was acted as an agent of the "Williams & Guion Black Star Line". John Stanton Williams was another partner of the "Williams & Guion Black Star Line" in New York City.

The elder brother William Howe Guion joined the office in New York City in 1853.

In January 1884, William Howe Guion left the "Williams & Guion Black Star Line" and his nephew William Howe Guion, Jr., 36 years old, became a partner and the company received name "Guion & Co.".

== See also ==
- 1850 US Census with Guions
