= Williams & Guion Black Star Line =

Guion Line

The Black Star Line was the name used by American sailing packets owned by the New York firm of Williams and Guion from 1848 to 1866. The line owned 18 ships on the Liverpool-Queenstown-New York route. The line was shut down in 1863 because of the success of newer, faster liners and the danger of transatlantic travel during the American Civil War.

== History ==
Williams and Guion was formed by John Stanton Williams and Stephen Barker Guion in 1848.

Guion moved to Liverpool in 1852 and acted as the line's agent. Williams remained in New York City. In 1853 Guion's older brother, William Howe Guion joined the New York City office.

In 1866, Stephen Guion became a British citizen. There he established the Guion Line of British steamships. Williams and Guion owned 52% of the steamship line and acted as the New York agent for the company. In 1876, John Williams died and the firm was restructured in 1883.

In January 1884, William Guion resigned from the firm and his 36-year-old nephew, William Howe Guion, Jr. was made partner and the company was now called Guion and Company.

The firm had to be liquidated in 1886 when both Stephen Guion and William Guion, Jr. died within weeks of each other. The Guion Line was then reorganized as a public stock corporation.
