= Charles Waller (cricketer) =

English cricketer

Personal information
- Full name: Charles Edward Waller
- Born: September 1832; Trimley St. Mary, Suffolk, England
- Died: 9 March 1886 (aged 53) at sea, Atlantic Ocean
- Batting: Unknown

Career statistics
Competition	First-class
Matches	2
Runs scored	20
Batting average	6.66
100s/50s	–/–
Top score	12
Balls bowled	0
Wickets	–
Bowling average	–
5 wickets in innings	–
10 wickets in match	–
Best bowling	–
Catches/stumpings	-/-
- Source: Cricinfo, 22 December 2018

Charles Edward Waller (September 1832 – 9 March 1886) was an English first-class cricketer.

The son of the Reverend Charles Waller, Sr., he was born at Trimley St. Mary in September 1832. He was educated at Marlborough College, before going up to Emmanuel College, Cambridge in 1851. He made his debut in first-class cricket for the Surrey Club against the Marylebone Cricket Club (MCC) at Lord's in 1855. He made a further first-class appearance for the Surrey Club in 1858, also against the MCC. He scored a total of 20 runs across his two first-class matches, with a highest score of 12. By 1886, he was the vicar of Humberstone near Leicester. He was a passenger aboard the SS Oregon in March 1886, along with his wife and son, when it collided with an unidentified schooner 32 miles from Jones Inlet, New York. While making it to a lifeboat he became ill, fell overboard and drowned.
