= SS Alaska (1881) =

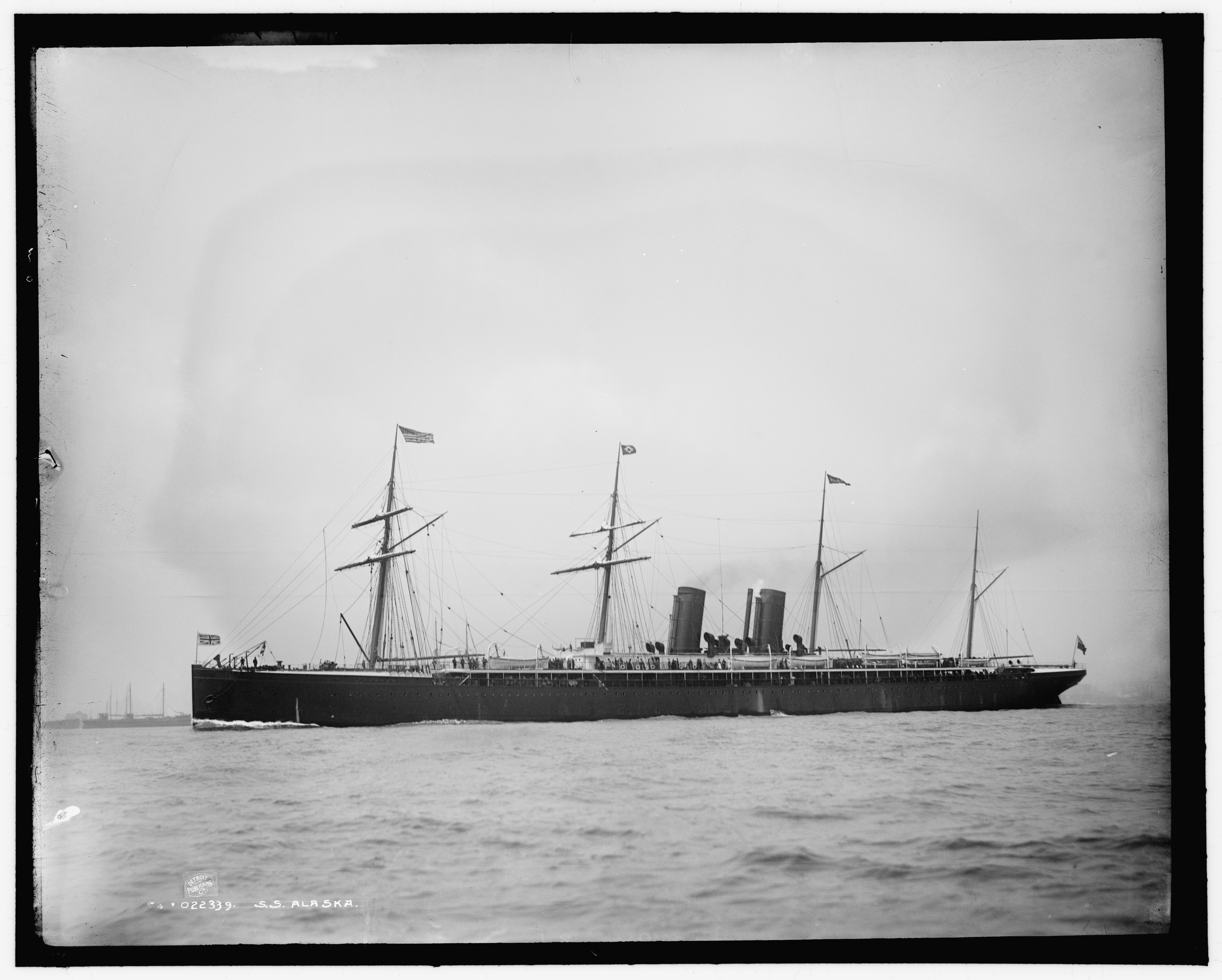
- SS Alaska under steam

History

United Kingdom
- Name: SS Alaska
- Operator: Guion Line
- Builder: John Elder & Company, in Govan, Scotland
- Launched: 15 July 1881
- Renamed: Magallanes (1897)
- Fate: Broken up 1902
- Notes: 4 mast and 2 funnel

General characteristics
- Class & type: Steam passenger ocean liner
- Tonnage: 6,932 gross register tons (GRT)
- Length: 526 ft (160 m)
- Beam: 50.5 ft (15.4 m)
- Propulsion: Single screw
- Speed: 16 knots
- Capacity: Approximately 350 saloon and 1000 steerage passengers

SS Alaska was a record-breaking British passenger liner that won the Blue Riband for the Guion Line as the fastest liner on the Atlantic in 1882. She was a slightly larger and faster edition of Guion's Arizona and in 1883 became the first liner to make the crossing to New York in under a week. However, Alaska burned 250 tons of coal per day, as compared to Arizona's already high 135 tons. Built by John Elder & Company of Glasgow, she carried 350 first class passengers and 1,000 steerage. Her passengers included Hugh Simpson Rodham, future grandfather of Hillary Clinton, who travelled in steerage to America with his mother Bella and seven siblings as a toddler in October 1882. As in the case of Arizona, Stephen Guion also personally owned Alaska.

On her maiden voyage she arrived at New York in December 1881.

Alaska completed 100 voyages when Guion suspended sailings in 1894. She proved difficult to sell and was finally chartered in 1897 by Cia. Transatlanticia Espanola as a troop transport. In 1899, Alaska was sold for scrap, but was resold to the Barrow shipyard where she was used as an accommodation hulk until broken up in 1902.

Records
Preceded by Germanic	Holder of the Blue Riband (Westbound record); 1882–1884	Succeeded by Oregon
Preceded by Arizona	Blue Riband (Eastbound Record); 1882–1884	Succeeded by Oregon
