= Blue Riband =

Fastest transatlantic passenger liner award

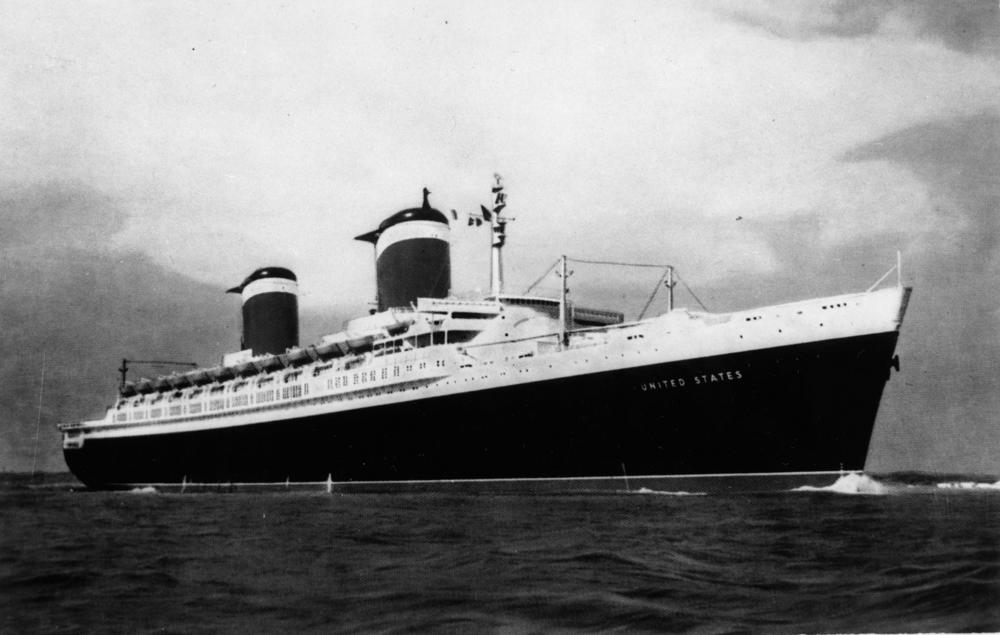
SS United States, last winner of the Blue Riband

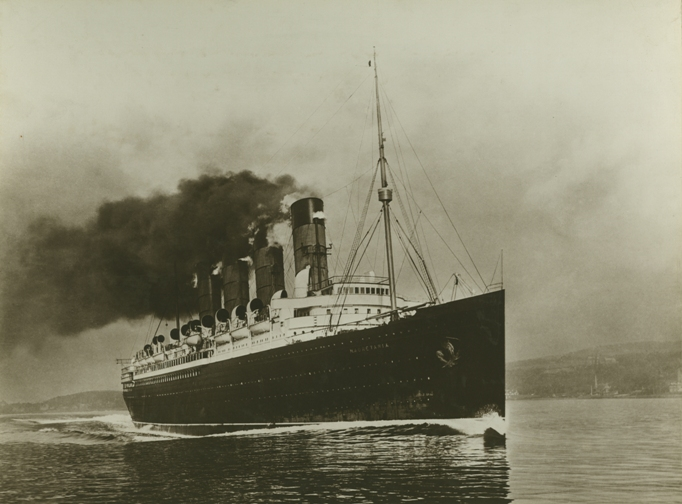
Cunard's Mauretania. She held the Blue Riband for the second-longest period of any ship, for 20 years, from 1909 to 1929.

The Blue Riband (/ˈrɪbənd/) is an unofficial accolade given to the passenger liner crossing the Atlantic Ocean in regular service with the record highest average speed. The term was borrowed from horse racing and was not widely used until after 1910. The record is based on average speed rather than passage time because ships follow different routes. Also, eastbound and westbound speed records are reckoned separately, as the more difficult westbound record voyage, against the Gulf Stream and the prevailing weather systems, typically results in lower average speeds. (Note: Kludas states that only westbound records counted for the Blue Riband, though this contradicts the other main sources on the subject (e.g. Lee, Gibbs, Bonsor, and contemporary news sources) which are clear that records in both directions qualified for the accolade.)

Of the 35 Atlantic liners to hold the Blue Riband, 25 were British, followed by 5 German, 3 American, and 1 each from Italy and France. Thirteen were Cunarders (plus Queen Mary of Cunard White Star), five White Star liners, with four owned by Norddeutscher Lloyd, two by Collins, two by Inman, two by Guion, and one each by British American, Great Western, Hamburg-America, the Italian Line, Compagnie Générale Transatlantique and finally the United States Lines. The record set by United States in 1952 remains unbroken by any passenger liner. The next-longest period through which the Blue Riband was retained was 19 years, held from 1909 to 1929 by Mauretania. The shortest period was 6 weeks, by Bremen from July to August 1933.

Many of these ships were built with substantial government subsidies and were designed with military considerations in mind. Winston Churchill estimated that the two Cunard Queens helped shorten the Second World War by a year. The last Atlantic liner to hold the Blue Riband, the United States, was designed for her potential use as a troopship as well as her service as a commercial passenger liner. There was no formal award until 1935, when Harold K. Hales donated the Hales Trophy; though the rules for the Hales Trophy were different from the traditional rules for the Blue Riband (for example, the Hales Trophy was originally only awarded for westbound records) and changed several times thereafter. It was awarded to just three Blue Riband holders during the express liner era. The trophy continues to be awarded, though many people believe United States remains as the holder of the Blue Riband, because no subsequent record-breaker was in Atlantic passenger service.

== Background ==
The first well-documented crossing of the North Atlantic, though not the earliest, was that of John Cabot's ship Matthew in the summer of 1497. Matthew crossed from Bristol to Newfoundland in 35 days, returning the following month in just 17 days. Over the next three centuries, countless vessels (merchant ships and warships, fast and slow, in peace and war) crossed back and forth over the North Atlantic, all subject to the vagaries of wind and weather. They arrived at port when they could, dependent on the wind, and left when they were loaded, frequently visiting other ports to complete their routes. During this period eastbound passages of 30 and 45 days were not uncommon, while westward passages of 65 to 90 days excited no attention. It was the advent of the steamship, with its independence from wind power, which offered the possibility of regular, scheduled Atlantic crossings, in periods of two to three weeks, that opened a new era of transatlantic travel and competition.

== History ==
The term "Blue Riband of the Atlantic" did not come into use until the 1890s, and the history of the trans-Atlantic competition, which was compiled retrospectively, was regarded as starting with the crossings by the steamships Sirius and Great Western in 1838. Although not the first steamships to cross the Atlantic (Savannah had crossed in 1819, and Royal William in 1831) nor the fastest to make the crossing (the packet sailing ship Columbia crossed west to east in 15 days 23 hours in 1830, and crossings by sail packets of 16 and 17 days were not unheard of) the Sirius and Great Western were the first steamships offering a regular, scheduled trans-Atlantic service; and crucially, they were involved in a race. Cunard refused officially to recognise the title because racing vessels was not in line with the company's safety policy.

=== Paddlers (1838–1872) ===
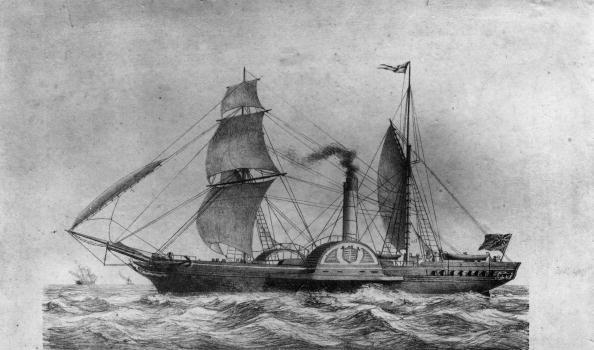
Sirius is considered the first Atlantic record-holder for her 1838 voyage to New York at 8.03 knots (14.87 km/h)

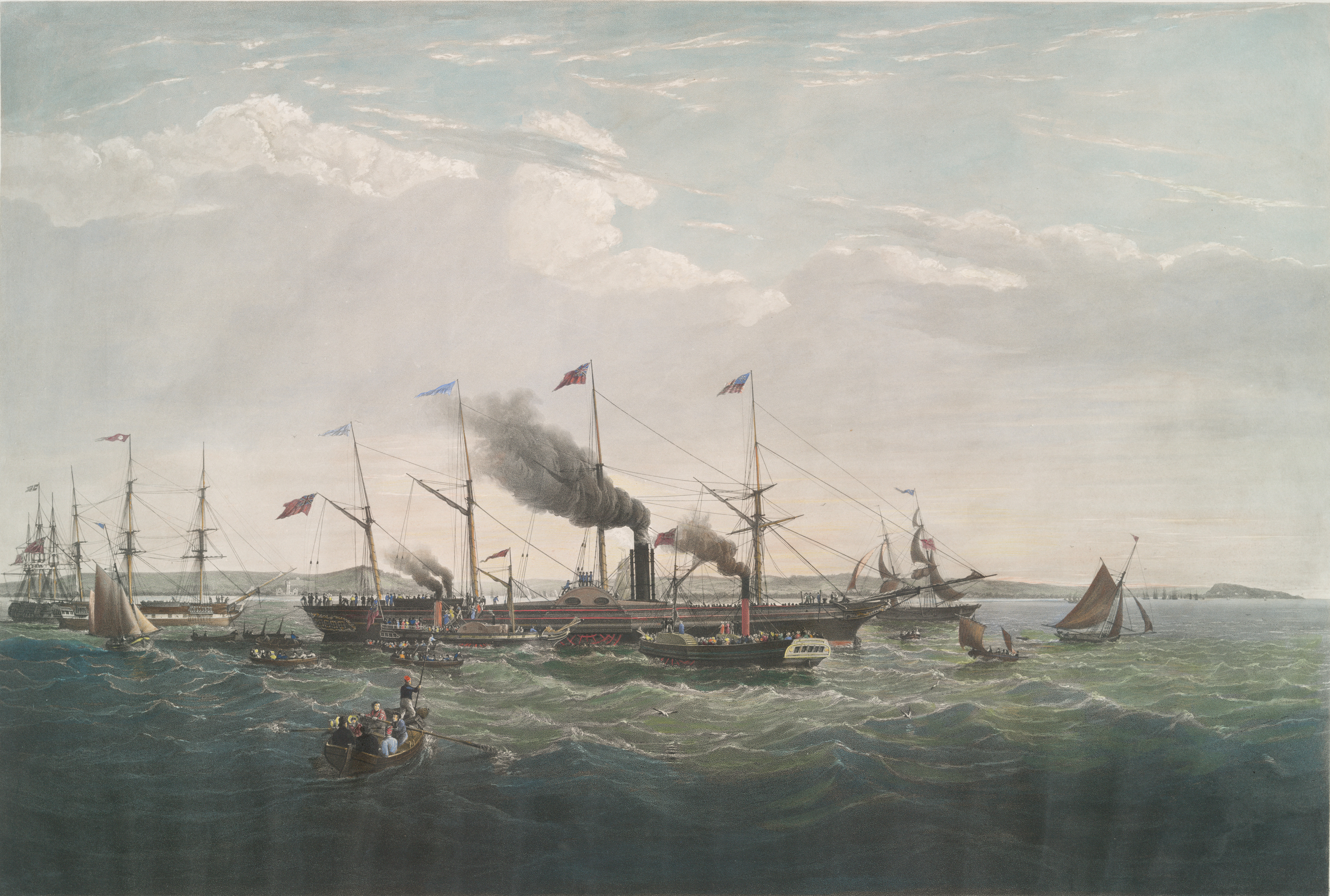
In 1843, Great Western recorded a record-breaking voyage of 10.03 knots (18.58 km/h)

The idea of building a line of transatlantic steamships was mooted in 1832 by Junius Smith, an American lawyer turned London merchant. The idea came to him during an Atlantic crossing which took 57 days, a not unusual occurrence, and it was published in the American Rail Road Journal. After receiving no support for several years, his plan gained credibility when Scottish shipbuilder Macgregor Laird became an investor. Smith, who is often considered the Father of the Atlantic Liner, formed the British and American Steam Navigation Company to operate a London-New York service. About the same time, the question of Atlantic steamships was discussed at an 1835 director's meeting of the newly formed Great Western Railway when the line's chief engineer, Isambard Kingdom Brunel supposedly joked that the line could be made longer by building a steamship to run between Bristol and New York. The necessary investors were recruited by Brunel's friend, Thomas Guppy, a Bristol engineer and businessman. The next year, the Great Western Steamship Company was established, even though the rail line was still years from completion.

By spring 1838, Brunel's Great Western was ready for sea, but Smith's first ship was still without engines. When Great Western scheduled its initial sailing, Laird suggested that British and American charter the Irish Sea steamer Sirius from the St. George Steam Packet Company for two voyages to beat Great Western. While the Sirius left Cork, Ireland four days before Great Western departed Avonmouth, Great Western still came within a day of overtaking Sirius to New York. To complete the voyage, Sirius was forced to burn spars (sections of masts, yards, booms, or spare timber poles) when coal ran low. With her westbound crossing at 8.03 knots (14.87 km/h), Sirius is often considered the first record holder even though she would have held the record for only one day, until Great Western's arrival from her even faster crossing. However the notion of a "Blue Riband" would not be used for several decades. Great Western herself became the prototype for all successful wooden paddlers and made a record-breaking voyage at 10.03 knots (18.58 km/h) as late as 1843.

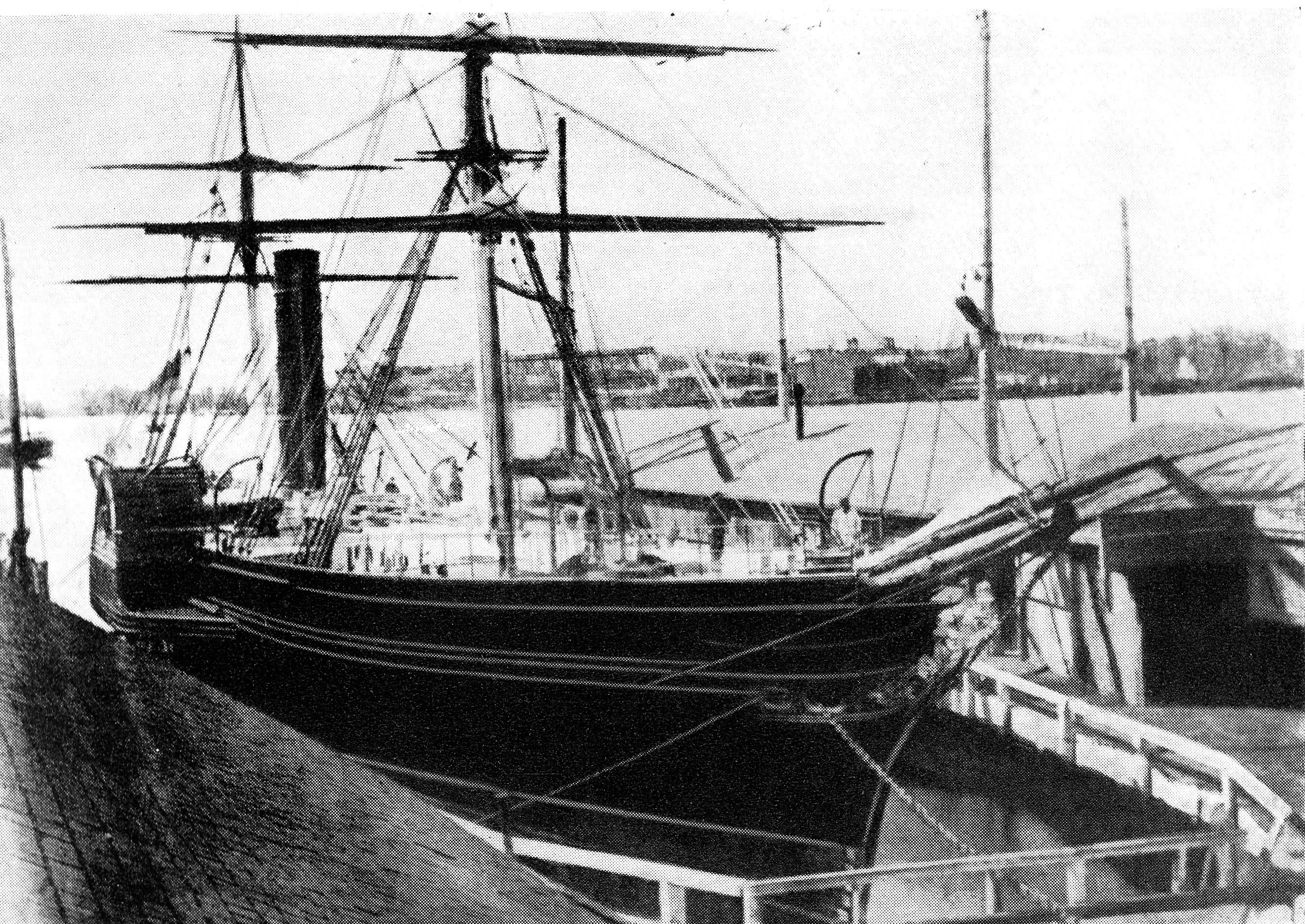
Europa of 1848 set the record with a voyage of 11.79 knots (21.84 km/h). This is one of the earliest known photos of an Atlantic steamship.

The Cunard Line started its Liverpool-Halifax-Boston service in 1840 with the four ships that were slightly reduced versions of Great Western with about the same speed. Ultimately Cunard built nine additional wood paddlers. By 1846, Cunard was the only original steamship line that survived, largely because of its subsidy from the British Admiralty to carry the mails and its emphasis on safety. Until 1850, the record passed between various Cunarders, finally reaching 12.25 knots (22.69 km/h) for an 8-day Liverpool-Halifax crossing by Asia. Record voyages during this period were often the result of using sails to gain extra speed from a following gale.

Cunard's first serious competition for the record came from the American-owned Collins Line. The American Government supplied Collins with a substantial subsidy to operate four wooden paddlers that were superior to Cunard's best. In its first year, 1850, the Pacific set the record at 12.46 knots (23.08 km/h) on a 10-day run from Liverpool to New York. Unfortunately, Collins suffered a setback when its Arctic foundered with heavy loss of life. The next year, Cunard put further pressure on Collins by commissioning its first iron-hulled paddler, the Persia, which set a new record with a 9-day, 16-hour Liverpool–New York voyage at 13.11 knots (24.28 km/h). During the Crimean War, Cunard supplied eleven of its ships for war service and suspended all routes except the Liverpool–Halifax–Boston service. While the Collins' fortunes improved because of the lack of competition during the war, Collins collapsed in 1858 after the loss of two additional steamers. Cunard emerged as the leading carrier of first-class passengers and in 1862 commissioned the Scotia, the last paddle steamer to set a record with a Queenstown-New York voyage at 14.46 knots (26.78 km/h). Scotia was the final significant paddler ordered for the Atlantic because under the terms of Cunard's mail contract with the Admiralty, it was still required to supply paddle steamers when needed for military service.

=== Single screw steamers (1872–1889) ===
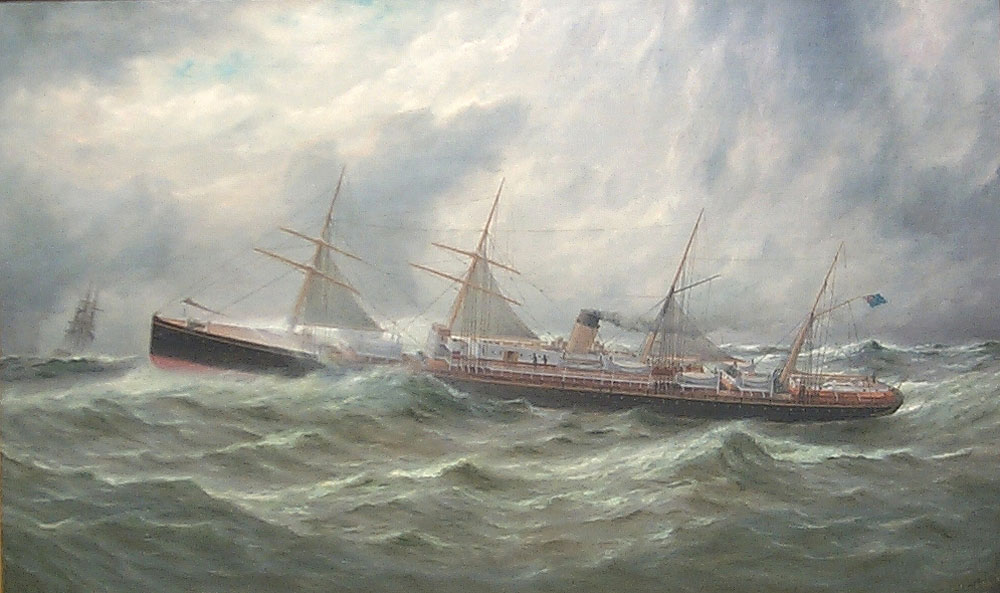
White Star's Adriatic by George Parker Greenwood. She was the first successful screw liner with an 1872 run at 14.65 knots (27.13 km/h)

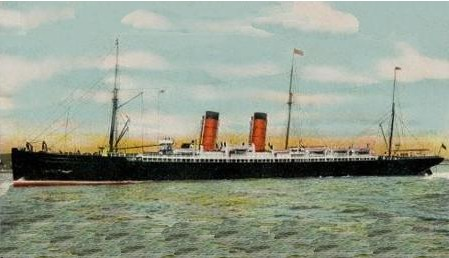
Cunard's Etruria of 1885, averaged 19.56 knots (36.23 km/h) on a record-breaking 1888 crossing

In 1845, Brunel's Great Britain became the first iron-hulled screw liner on the Atlantic. Starting in 1850, the Inman Line built numerous reduced versions for the steerage trade. In 1866, Inman started to commission single screw express liners that were the equal of Scotia. The Admiralty allowed Cunard to order its first screw express liner, the Russia. In 1871 both companies faced a new rival when the White Star Line commissioned Oceanic and her five sisters. The following year, White Star's Adriatic finally surpassed Scotia with a voyage at 14.65 knots (27.13 km/h). The new White Star record-breakers were especially economical because of their use of compound engines, but their high ratio of length to beam (10:1 compared to the previous norm of 8:1) increased vibration. To counter this, White Star placed the dining saloon midships and made their ships more luxurious. Inman rebuilt its express fleet to the new standard, but Cunard lagged behind both of its rivals. In 1875, Inman's new City of Berlin averaged 15.21 knots (28.17 km/h) on its record-breaking voyage.

During the five-year shipping depression that began in 1873, William Pearce, the controlling partner of the John Elder shipyard, became convinced that a crack steamer that carried only passengers and light freight could be profitable because she would attract more passengers and spend less time in port. He proposed a ship that crammed the most powerful machinery possible into the hull, sacrificing everything to speed. When Cunard rejected his proposal, Pearce offered his idea to the Guion Line, a firm primarily engaged in the steerage trade. The first ship Pearce built for Guion, the Arizona was described as a "souped-up transatlantic hot rod" by one nautical historian. While she won only the eastbound record, two years later, Guion took delivery of the even faster Alaska that set the record at 16.07 knots (29.76 km/h). To continue the program, Pearce offered Guion favourable terms on a third unit, the Oregon, which raised the record to 18.56 knots (34.37 km/h) in 1884. These ships were uncomfortable and their excessive coal consumption made them uneconomic. However, for a while they were popular with American clients because of their American ownership.

After being out of the contest for a decade, Cunard finally started to rebuild. In 1884, Cunard purchased Oregon from the Guion line when that firm defaulted on payments to the shipyard. Later that year, Cunard commissioned the first steel-hulled record-breakers, Umbria and Etruria. Etruria, the faster of the pair, raised the record to 19.56 knots (36.23 km/h) on a 6-day, 2-hour run from Queenstown to Sandy Hook in 1888. However, Etruria and her sister represented the limit of single screw technology.

=== Double-screw steamers (1889–1907) ===
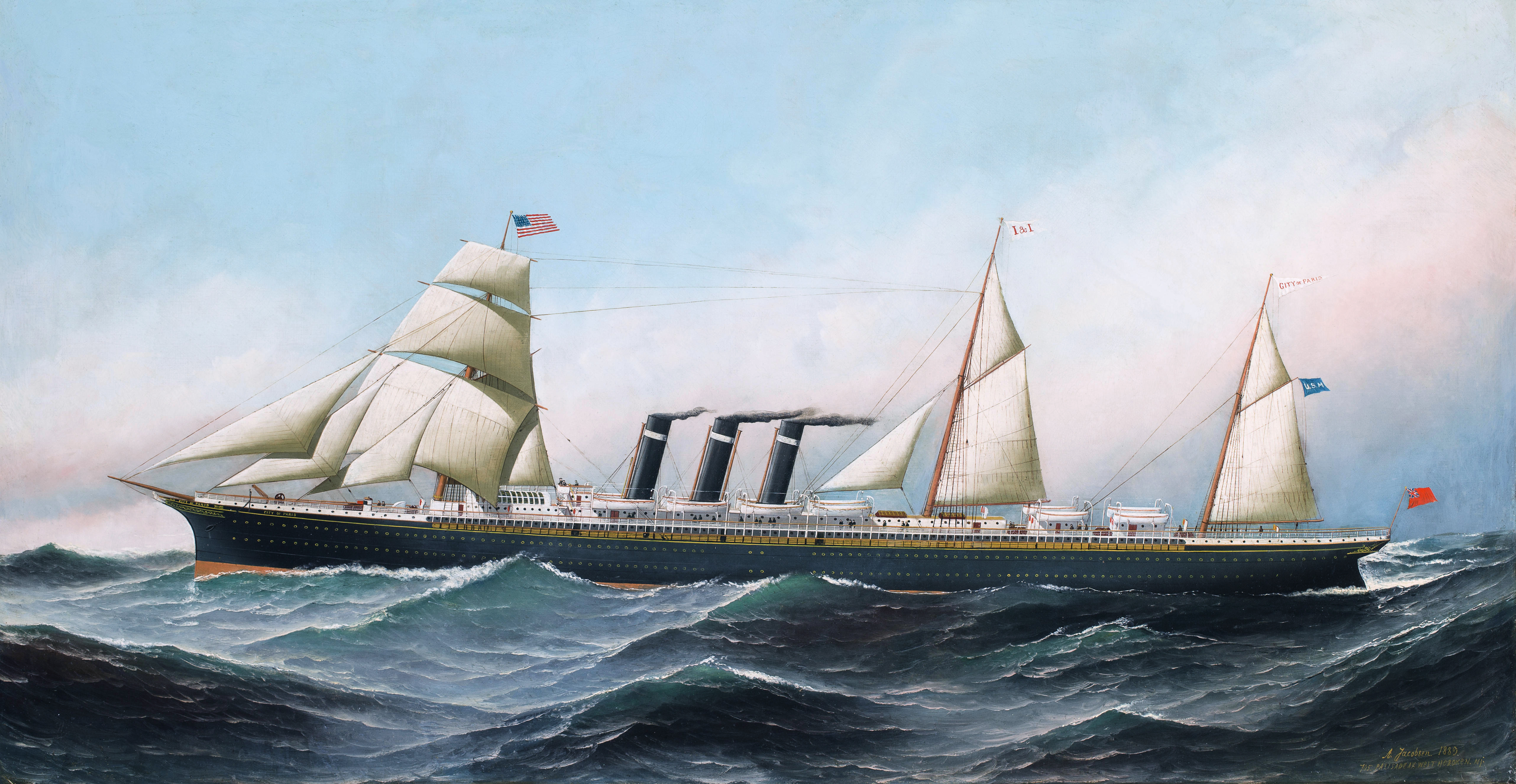
Inman's City of Paris set a record of 20.01 knots (37.06 km/h) in 1889.

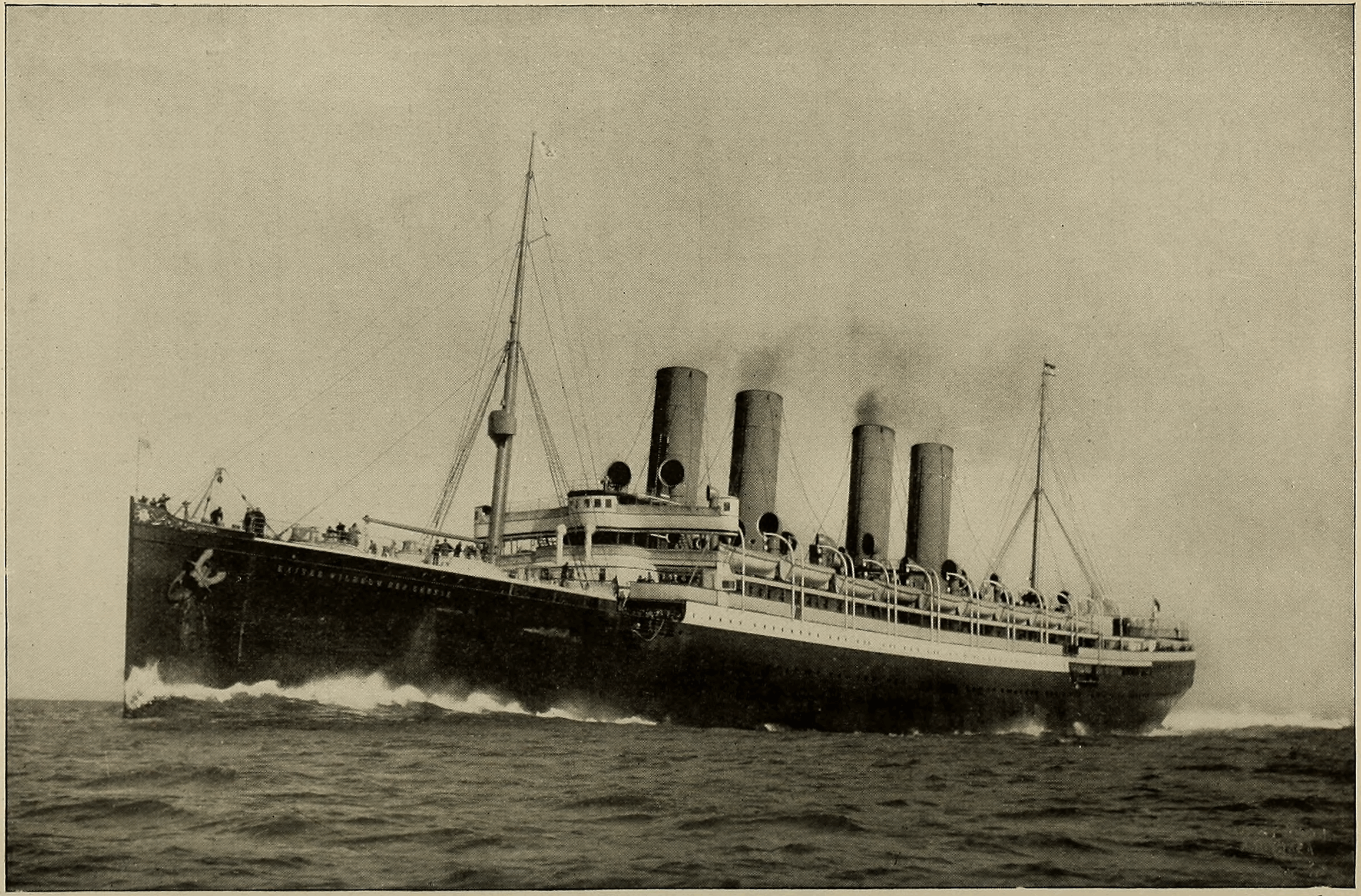
NDL's Kaiser Wilhelm der Grosse raised the record to 22.29 knots (41.28 km/h) in 1898

The Inman line fell on hard times after their intended record-breaker, City of Rome failed to meet expectations and was returned to her builders in 1882. Inman directors agreed to voluntary liquidation so that the largest creditor, the Philadelphia-based International Navigation Company, could purchase Inman's assets. The new owners provided the capital to build two outstanding record breakers, the twin-screw City of New York and the City of Paris. Starting in 1889, the latter ship set the record on four occasions, including a voyage at 20.7 knots (38.3 km/h) in 1892. White Star, which had not built an express liner since the Germanic of 1875, commissioned the record-breaker Teutonic of 1889 and the Majestic of 1890 after receiving a subsidy from the Admiralty to make the pair available as merchant cruisers in the event of hostilities. Cunard countered with two even faster ships, the Campania and the Lucania of 1893. The next year, Lucania recorded a voyage at 21.81 knots (40.39 km/h). Inman became the American Line and ordered two additional express liners from American yards, but no attempt was made to best the new Cunarders. In 1894, Guion ceased sailing as its ships were now hopelessly outdated.

No sooner had Cunard reestablished its supremacy than new rivals emerged. Beginning in the late 1860s, several German firms commissioned liners that were almost as fast as the British mail steamers working from Liverpool. In 1889, the Hamburg-America Line commissioned four double-screw steamers capable of 18.00 knots (33.34 km/h). Its rival, Norddeutscher Lloyd (NDL), lagged behind until 1895 when it ordered two ships intended to take the record. In 1898, the Kaiser Wilhelm der Grosse raised the record to 22.29 knots (41.28 km/h), while the other liner, Kaiser Friedrich failed to achieve her contract speed and was returned to her builders. Hamburg America ordered the even more powerful Deutschland that reached 23.06 knots (42.71 km/h) on one of her record-breaking voyages of 1900. However, Hamburg America quickly learned that these high-powered double-screw liners had vibration problems. Deutschland had the unpleasant nickname of "cocktail shaker" and actually lost part of her stern in 1902 because of the constant vibration.

Rather than to match the new German speedsters, White Star decided to drop out of the competition and commission the four large Celtic-class luxury liners of more moderate speed. White Star realised that passengers preferred comfort even if this meant spending an extra day at sea. In 1902, White Star joined the American owned International Mercantile Marine Co. (IMM) that owned the American Line and others. IMM also had trade agreements with Hamburg America and Norddeutscher Lloyd. After its bad experience with the Deutschland, Hamburg America also dropped out of the race and commissioned large luxury liners based on the Celtic. However, NDL completed building a fleet of four additional express liners modelled on Kaiser Wilhelm der Grosse.

=== Ships of state (1907–1969) ===
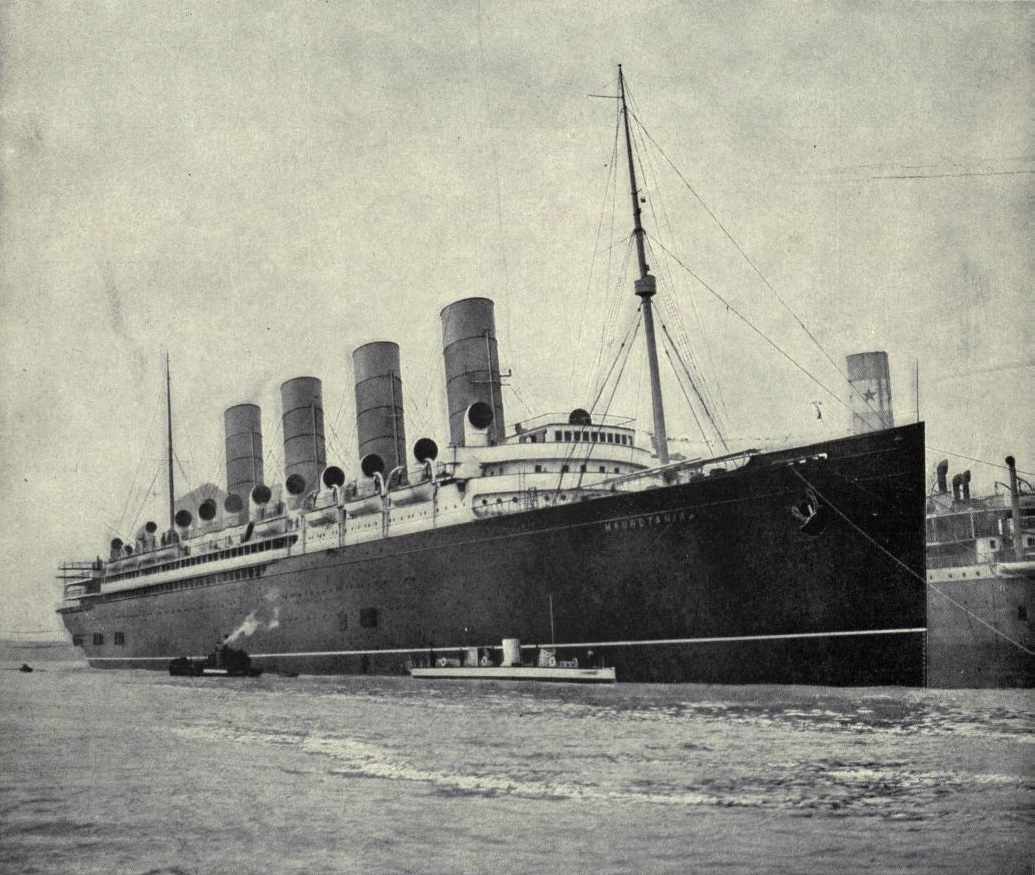
Cunard's Mauretania held the Blue Riband from 1909 to 1929 at 26.06 knots (48.26 km/h; 29.99 mph)

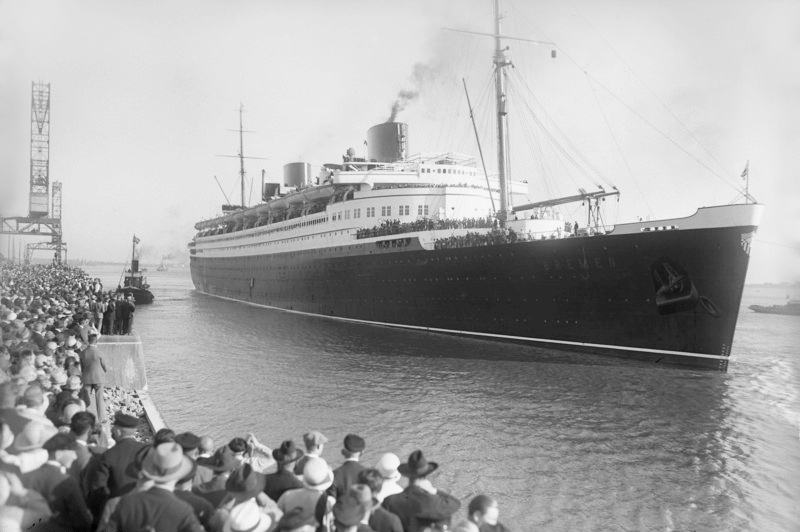
NDL's Bremen finally broke Mauretania's record in 1929 by averaging 27.83 knots (51.54 km/h; 32.03 mph)

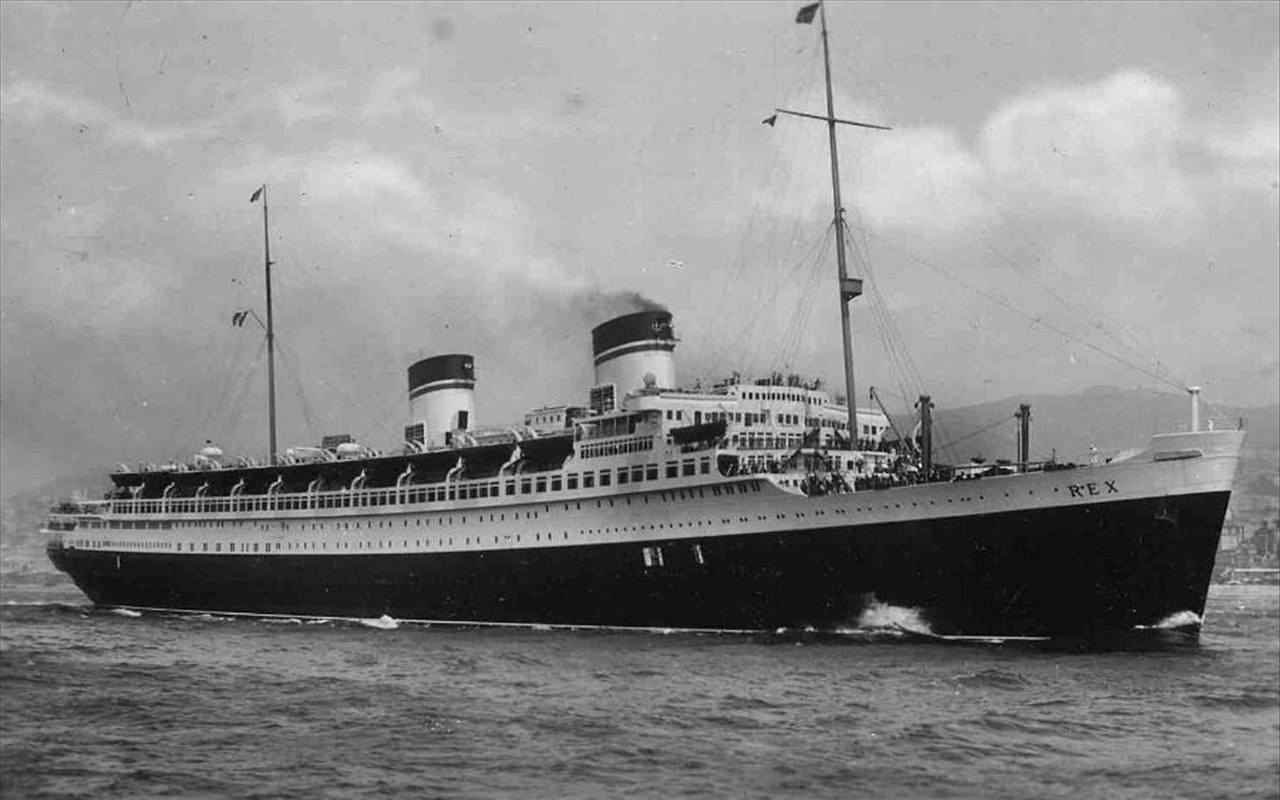
The Italian Rex joined the Blue Riband club with a 1933 voyage of 28.92 knots (53.56 km/h; 33.28 mph)

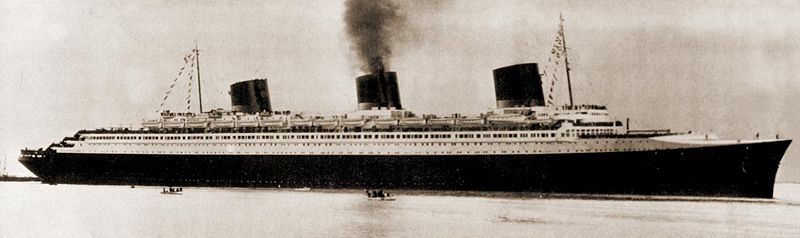
CGT's Normandie won the Blue Riband at 30.58 knots (56.63 km/h; 35.19 mph) in 1937

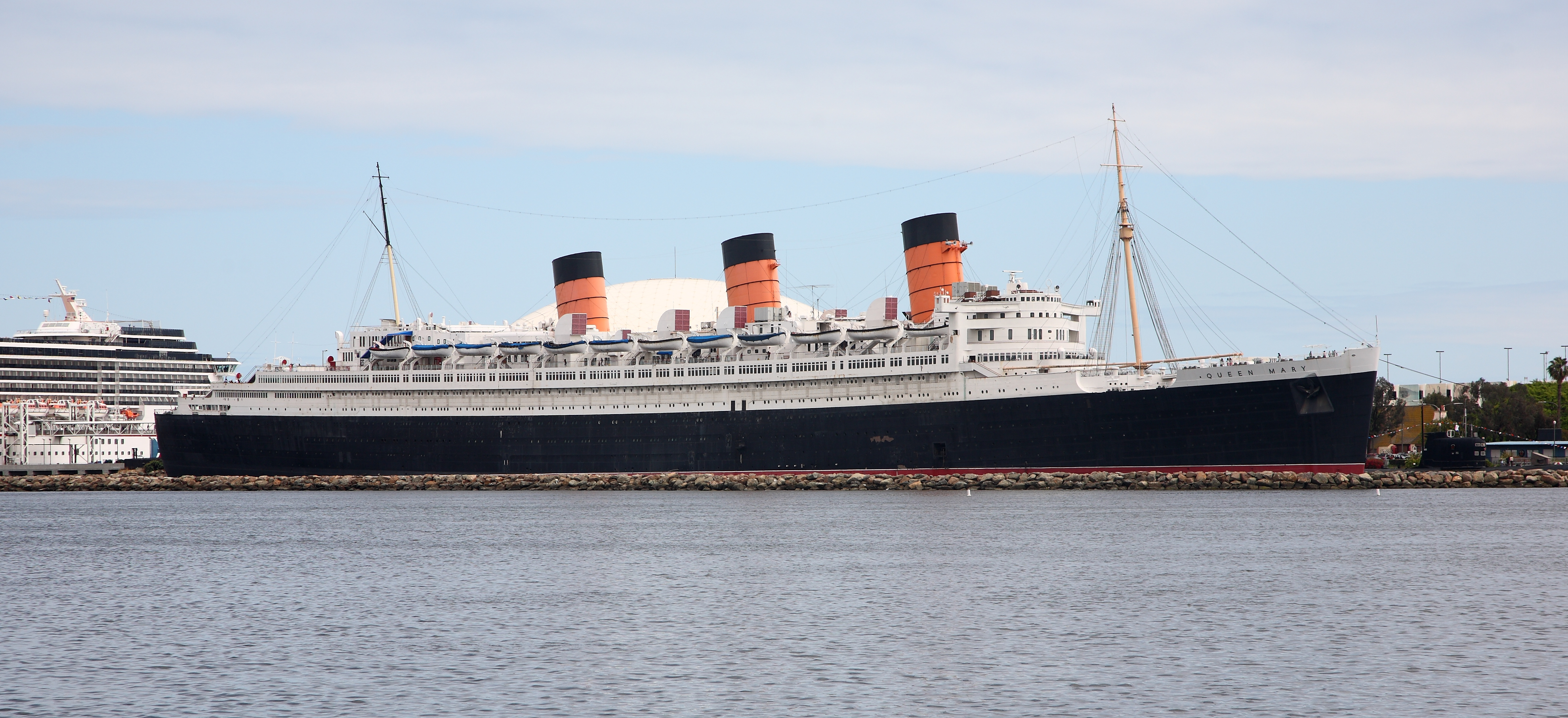
Cunard White Star's Queen Mary regained the Blue Riband at 31.69 knots (58.69 km/h; 36.47 mph) in 1938

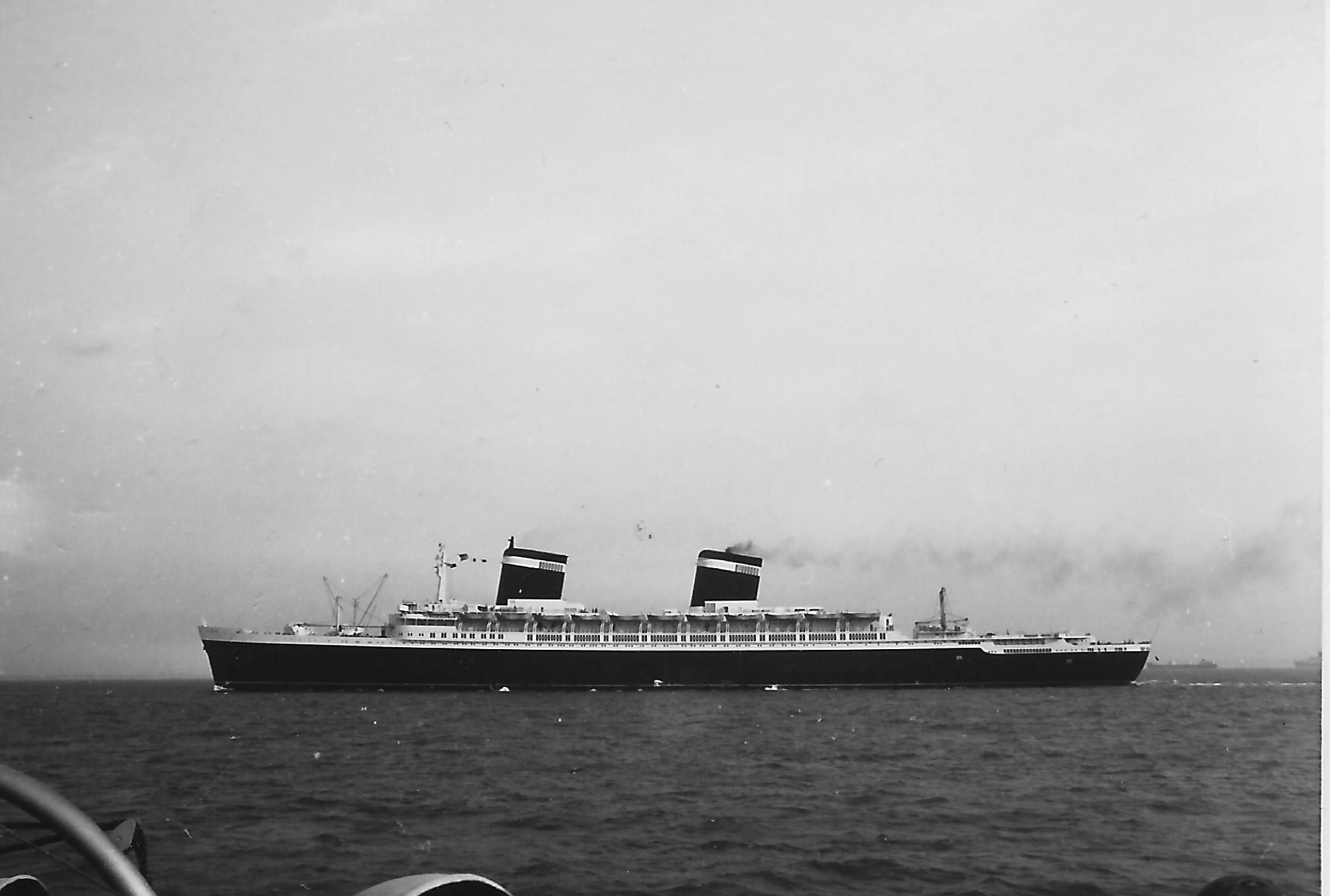
United States won the Blue Riband at 35.59 knots (65.91 km/h; 40.96 mph) in 1952

After 1902, only the Cunard Line and the French Compagnie Générale Transatlantique (CGT) were independent of the IMM combine. British prestige was at stake, and the Government provided Cunard with an annual subsidy of £150,000 plus a low-interest loan of £2.5 million to pay for the construction of the two superliners, Lusitania and Mauretania, under the condition that they be available for conversion to armed cruisers when needed by the navy. Starting in 1907, both ships won the Blue Riband and Mauretania's 1909 record of 26.06 knots (48.26 km/h) stood for 20 years. However, these ships paid a price for speed and lacked many of the amenities found in the new White Star and Hamburg American luxury liners. Both Cunard rivals ordered a trio of even bigger luxury liners, the White Star Olympic class capable of 21.5 knots (39.8 km/h) and HAPAG's Imperator class capable of 22.5 knots (41.7 km/h). Even Cunard chose this approach when it ordered its third superliner, the Aquitania.

As a result of the war, Hamburg American and Norddeutscher Lloyd lost their premier units. In 1926, the US Government awarded Norddeutscher Lloyd (NDL) $27 million in compensation for its confiscated liners. By this time, improvements in turbine technology and hull form, along with the use of fuel oil instead of coal, made it possible to build more civilised record breakers. Using these funds, NDL ordered two ships designed to cross the Atlantic in five days, the Bremen and Europa. However, the American government netted the award against debts owed by the German Government and Berlin was forced to directly subsidise NDL to continue the project. Bremen recorded 27.83 knots (51.54 km/h) on her 1929 Blue Riband voyage and Europa increased the Blue Riband to 27.92 knots (51.71 km/h) in 1933.

In 1928, as Britain's response to the German Bremen and Europa, the White Star Line ordered a new diesel-electric 1,000-foot long ocean liner to be named Oceanic capable of 200,000 shaft horsepower (150,000 kW). Construction started on 28 June 1928. However, White Star did not have the funds to complete the liner, and Oceanic's construction was put on hold until 1931 when her keel was silently scrapped. Her ahead-of-their-time engines might have been powerful enough to enable her to win the Blue Riband.

In 1929, two lines from Italy each ordered a ship based on the German pair. Just as these ships were being completed, the Italian government nationalised the shipping industry, creating the Italian Line. While both superliners were successful, only the Rex won the Blue Riband, with a 1933 voyage at 28.92 knots (53.56 km/h).

CGT also ordered a new superliner in 1929. The next year, Cunard started construction on an 80,000-ton liner that was to be the first of two record-breakers fast enough to fit into a two-ship weekly Southampton–New York service. Consequently, CGT altered its plans to make its new liner even bigger. However, as the 1929 shipping depression intensified, construction on Cunard's hull 534 was halted while work on the heavily subsidised French ship continued. By 1934, both Cunard and White Star lines were failing, and the British Government was concerned about potential job losses. Therefore, the government agreed to give Cunard a loan of £3 million to complete hull 534 as the Queen Mary and an additional £5 million to build a second ship, the Queen Elizabeth, only if Cunard merged with White Star.

CGT's Normandie entered service in 1935 and won the Blue Riband at 29.98 knots (55.52 km/h). Queen Mary was commissioned the next year, and after a few break-in voyages, took the Blue Riband to 30.14 knots (55.82 km/h). The two liners were operated as a pair and traded the Blue Riband again, with the Cunard White Star Liner ultimately posting 30.99 knots (57.39 km/h) in 1938. Queen Mary's consort, Queen Elizabeth, was commissioned after war was declared and was never allowed to attempt the record.

In 1935, Harold K. Hales (1868–1942), a member of the UK Parliament and owner of a shipping company, commissioned a large trophy to be presented to the fastest ship crossing the Atlantic, in order to formalize the rules surrounding the trans-Atlantic competition. The rules for the trophy did not correspond to the traditional rules for the Blue Riband in that the trophy was to be awarded only to surface passenger ships achieving the fastest speed in the westbound direction. Other rule changes further complicated the situation, and eventually the trophy was awarded to just three Blue Riband holders; Rex, in 1935, Normandie in 1936, and United States in 1952.

Of the ships of state, only Queen Mary, Queen Elizabeth, and Europa survived the war. Europa became CGT's Liberté and no attempt was made to retain her former speed when she was reconstructed. However, the United States government was impressed by the large numbers of troops carried by the Queens during the war and ordered a superliner that was as much a troop carrier as an express liner. On her maiden voyage in 1952, the United States upped the Blue Riband to 35.59 knots (65.91 km/h) eastbound and 34.51 knots (63.91 km/h) westbound. In 1958, the transatlantic airlines put jet transports into service, and the days of the record-breakers were numbered. Liberté retired in 1961, along with Queen Mary in 1967, and United States in 1969.

=== The Blue Riband today (1969–present) ===
With the success of United States in 1952, with average speed of 35.59 knots (65.91 km/h), and Cunard's decision not to challenge the new record, there was growing recognition that the era of fast crossings by express liners was becoming a thing of the past and that the contest for fast transatlantic travel was shifting to the air.

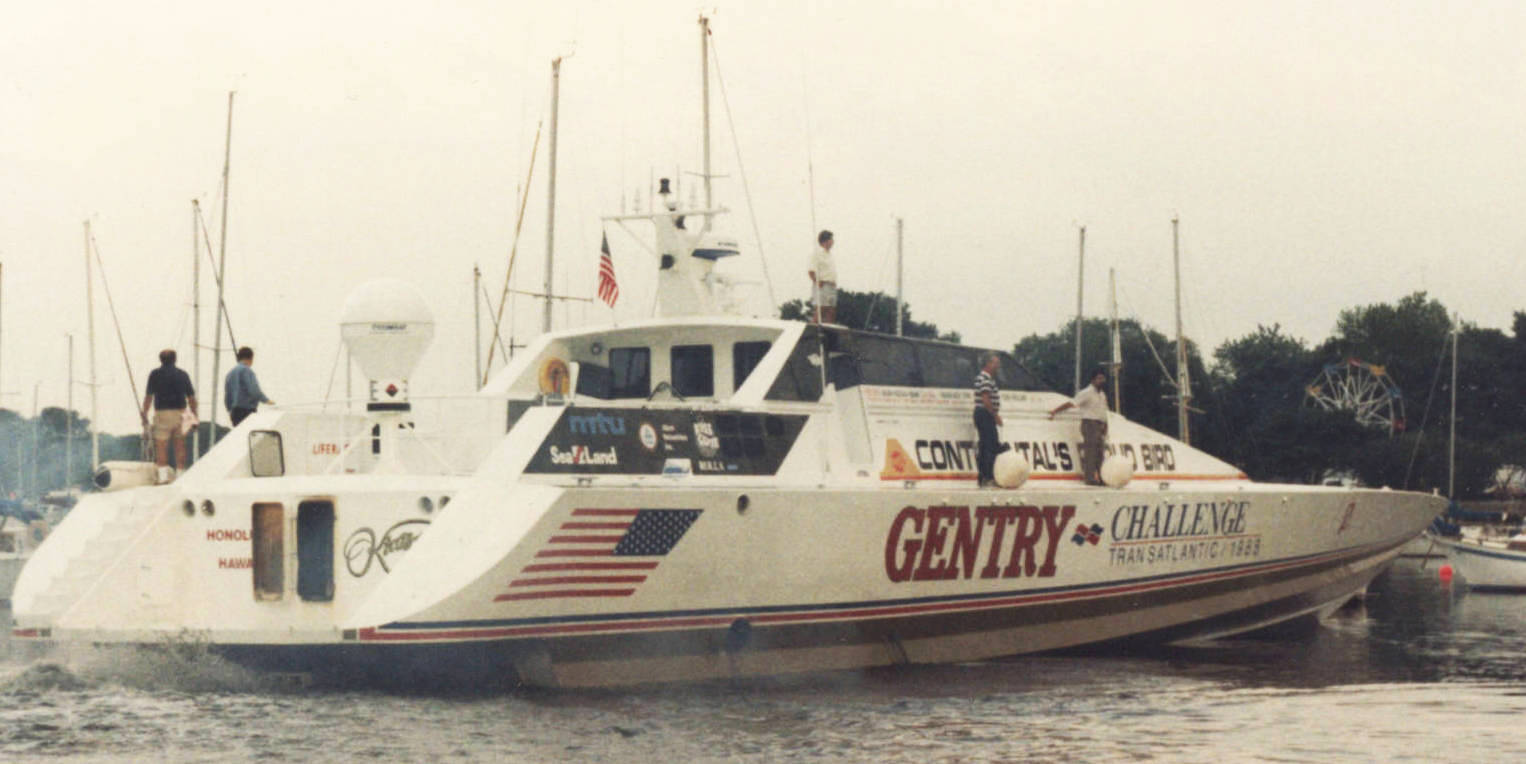
Tom Gentry's Gentry Eagle at Mamaroneck, New York, prior to a record attempt

At sea, United States ' record stood until 1986, when it was challenged by British businessman Richard Branson and his high-speed motor vessel, Virgin Atlantic Challenger. Despite having to stop to refuel on several occasions, Branson shaved two hours off the record, increasing the average speed to 36.4 knots (67.4 km/h). However, as Virgin Atlantic Challenger was not a passenger vessel, the New York Maritime Museum refused to part with the Hales Trophy, so Branson inaugurated the Virgin Atlantic Challenge Trophy, for the fastest unqualified Atlantic crossing, open to all challengers. Three years later, this was won by Tom Gentry, whose Gentry Eagle slashed the record, crossing in 62 hours at an average speed of 47.4 knots (87.8 km/h). In 1992, the Virgin Atlantic Challenge was won by the Aga Khan's Destriero, crossing in 58 hours 34 minutes and averaging 53.09 knots (98.32 km/h). She also made a record-breaking return journey, winning the Columbus Atlantic Trophy, posted by the yacht club in response to the Virgin Atlantic Challenge for the fastest two-way voyage, i.e. a single crossing and return voyage within a specified time.

Meanwhile, Incat, builders of fast catamaran ferries, and therefore indisputably commercial vessels, decided to make an attempt to win the Hales Trophy, the record still held by United States. This was achieved in 1990 by Hoverspeed Great Britain, with a non-stop crossing of 79 hours 54 minutes, averaging 36.6 knots (67.8 km/h), and Incat were awarded the trophy by the Hales Trophy Committee. Eight years later, this record was broken by another Incat vessel, Catalonia, and again the following month by Cat-Link V with 68 hours and 9 minutes, at 41.28 knots (76.45 km/h).

With the end of the express liners era, the Blue Riband has become an item of largely historical interest, with some authors regarding the United States as the last holder of the accolade.

== List of record breakers ==
The following is the latest consensus list of the research to date. Because there was no sanctioning body for the Blue Riband, researchers are limited to surviving shipping company archives and press reports to develop the list of Blue Riband winners. These lists are retrospective and limited to steamships only. Therefore, most lists feature Sirius, in her race with Great Western in 1838, as the first record-holder, although her crossing was not as fast as some sail packet ships of the period. Early writers including Arthur Maginnus (1892), Henry Frey (1896), Charles Lee (1931) and C. R. Benstead (1936) were the standard sources until the 1950s. Since then, C. R. Vernon Gibbs (1952), and Noel Bonsor (1975) added to the body of knowledge, with additional detail about the German ships provided by Arnold Kludas.

Over the years, the lists have not agreed. For example, Gibbs credits Inman's City of Paris with an 1866 Blue Riband voyage, and Cunard's Russia with an eastbound record the following year because he considered as dubious Scotia's Blue Riband claim of 14.46 knots (26.78 km/h), supposedly based on a very long track. Later writers have included the Scotia claim. Gibbs also includes the claimed Blue Riband voyage at 17.6 knots (32.6 km/h) of the National Line's America of 1884 that was not confirmed by later researchers.

=== Westbound record breakers ===
Ship	Flag	Year	Dates	Line	From	To	Distance	Days, hours, minutes	Speed
Sirius		1838	4–22 April	British & American	Queenstown	Sandy Hook	3,583 nautical miles (6,636 km)	18 d, 14 h, 22 m	8.03 knots (14.87 km/h)
Great Western		1838	8–23 April	GW	Avonmouth	New York	3,220 nautical miles (5,960 km)	15 d, 12 h, 0 m	8.66 knots (16.04 km/h)
Great Western		1838	2–17 June	GW	Avonmouth	New York	3,140 nautical miles (5,820 km)	14 d, 16 h, 0 m	8.92 knots (16.52 km/h)
Great Western		1839	18–31 May	GW	Avonmouth	New York	3,086 nautical miles (5,715 km)	13 d, 12 h, 0 m	9.52 knots (17.63 km/h)
Columbia		1841	4–15 June	Cunard	Liverpool	Halifax	2,534 nautical miles (4,693 km)	10 d, 19 h, 0 m	9.78 knots (18.11 km/h)
Great Western		1843	29 April – 11 May	GW	Liverpool	New York	3,068 nautical miles (5,682 km)	12 d, 18 h, 0 m	10.03 knots (18.58 km/h)
Cambria		1845	19–29 July	Cunard	Liverpool	Halifax	2,534 nautical miles (4,693 km)	9 d, 20 h, 30 m	10.71 knots (19.83 km/h)
America		1848	3–12 June	Cunard	Liverpool	Halifax	2,534 nautical miles (4,693 km)	9 d, 0 h, 16 m	11.71 knots (21.69 km/h)
Europa		1848	14–23 October	Cunard	Liverpool	Halifax	2,534 nautical miles (4,693 km)	8 d, 23 h, 0 m	11.79 knots (21.84 km/h)
Asia		1850	18–27 May	Cunard	Liverpool	Halifax	2,534 nautical miles (4,693 km)	8 d, 14 h, 50 m	12.25 knots (22.69 km/h)
Pacific		1850	11–21 September	Collins	Liverpool	New York	3,050 nautical miles (5,650 km)	10 d, 4 h, 45 m	12.46 knots (23.08 km/h)
Baltic		1851	6–16 August	Collins	Liverpool	New York	3,039 nautical miles (5,628 km)	9 d, 19 h, 26 m	12.91 knots (23.91 km/h)
Baltic		1854	28 June – 7 July	Collins	Liverpool	New York	3,037 nautical miles (5,625 km)	9 d, 16 h, 52 m	13.04 knots (24.15 km/h)
Persia		1856	19–29 April	Cunard	Liverpool	Sandy Hook	3,045 nautical miles (5,639 km)	9 d, 16 h, 16 m	13.11 knots (24.28 km/h)
Scotia		1863	19–27 July	Cunard	Queenstown	New York	2,820 nautical miles (5,220 km)	8 d, 3 h, 0 m	14.46 knots (26.78 km/h)
Adriatic		1872	17–25 May	W.Star	Queenstown	Sandy Hook	2,778 nautical miles (5,145 km)	7 d, 23 h, 17 m	14.53 knots (26.91 km/h)
Germanic		1875	30 July – 7 August	W.Star	Queenstown	Sandy Hook	2,800 nautical miles (5,200 km)	7 d, 23 h, 7 m	14.65 knots (27.13 km/h)
City of Berlin		1875	17–25 September	Inman	Queenstown	Sandy Bank	2,829 nautical miles (5,239 km)	7 d, 18 h, 2 m	15.21 knots (28.17 km/h)
Britannic		1876	27 October – 4 November	W.Star	Queenstown	Sandy Hook	2,795 nautical miles (5,176 km)	7 d, 13 h, 11 m	15.43 knots (28.58 km/h)
Germanic		1877	6–13 April	W.Star	Queenstown	Sandy Hook	2,830 nautical miles (5,240 km)	7 d, 11 h, 37 m	15.76 knots (29.19 km/h)
Alaska		1882	9–16 April	Guion	Queenstown	Sandy Hook	2,802 nautical miles (5,189 km)	7 d, 6 h, 20 m	16.07 knots (29.76 km/h)
Alaska		1882	14–21 May	Guion	Queenstown	Sandy Hook	2,871 nautical miles (5,317 km)	7 d, 4 h, 12 m	16.67 knots (30.87 km/h)
Alaska		1882	18–25 June	Guion	Queenstown	Sandy Hook	2,886 nautical miles (5,345 km)	7 d, 1 h, 58 m	16.98 knots (31.45 km/h)
Alaska		1883	29 April – 6 May	Guion	Queenstown	Sandy Hook	2,844 nautical miles (5,267 km)	6 d, 23 h, 48 m	17.05 knots (31.58 km/h)
Oregon		1884	13–19 April	Guion	Queenstown	Sandy Hook	2,861 nautical miles (5,299 km)	6 d, 10 h, 10 m	18.56 knots (34.37 km/h)
Etruria		1885	16–22 August	Cunard	Queenstown	Sandy Hook	2,801 nautical miles (5,187 km)	6 d, 5 h, 31 m	18.73 knots (34.69 km/h)
Umbria		1887	29 May – 4 June	Cunard	Queenstown	Sandy Hook	2,848 nautical miles (5,274 km)	6 d, 4 h, 12 m	19.22 knots (35.60 km/h)
Etruria		1888	27 May – 2 June	Cunard	Queenstown	Sandy Hook	2,854 nautical miles (5,286 km)	6 d, 1 h, 55 m	19.56 knots (36.23 km/h)
City of Paris		1889	2–8 May	Inman	Queenstown	Sandy Hook	2,855 nautical miles (5,287 km)	5 d, 23 h, 7 m	19.95 knots (36.95 km/h)
City of Paris		1889	22–28 August	Inman	Queenstown	Sandy Hook	2,788 nautical miles (5,163 km)	5 d, 19 h, 18 m	20.01 knots (37.06 km/h)
Majestic		1891	30 July – 5 August	W.Star	Queenstown	Sandy Hook	2,777 nautical miles (5,143 km)	5 d, 18 h, 8 m	20.10 knots (37.23 km/h)
Teutonic		1891	13–19 August	W.Star	Queenstown	Sandy Hook	2,778 nautical miles (5,145 km)	5 d, 16 h, 31 m	20.35 knots (37.69 km/h)
City of Paris		1892	20–27 July	Inman	Queenstown	Sandy Hook	2,785 nautical miles (5,158 km)	5 d, 15 h, 58 m	20.48 knots (37.93 km/h)
City of Paris		1892	13–18 October	Inman	Queenstown	Sandy Hook	2,782 nautical miles (5,152 km)	5 d, 14 h, 24 m	20.70 knots (38.34 km/h)
Campania		1893	18–23 June	Cunard	Queenstown	Sandy Hook	2,864 nautical miles (5,304 km)	5 d, 15 h, 37 m	21.12 knots (39.11 km/h)
Campania		1894	12–17 August	Cunard	Queenstown	Sandy Hook	2,776 nautical miles (5,141 km)	5 d, 9 h, 29 m	21.44 knots (39.71 km/h)
Lucania		1894	26–31 August	Cunard	Queenstown	Sandy Hook	2,787 nautical miles (5,162 km)	5 d, 8 h, 38 m	21.65 knots (40.10 km/h)
Lucania		1894	23–28 September	Cunard	Queenstown	Sandy Hook	2,782 nautical miles (5,152 km)	5 d, 7 h, 48 m	21.75 knots (40.28 km/h)
Lucania		1894	21–26 October	Cunard	Queenstown	Sandy Hook	2,779 nautical miles (5,147 km)	5 d, 7 h, 23 m	21.81 knots (40.39 km/h)
Kaiser Wilhelm der Grosse	German Empire	1898	30 March – 3 April	NDL	The Needles	Sandy Hook	3,120 nautical miles (5,780 km)	5 d, 20 h, 0 m	22.29 knots (41.28 km/h)
Deutschland	German Empire	1900	6–12 July	Hapag	Eddystone	Sandy Hook	3,044 nautical miles (5,637 km)	5 d, 15 h, 46 m	22.42 knots (41.52 km/h)
Deutschland	German Empire	1900	26 August – 1 September	Hapag	Cherbourg	Sandy Hook	3,050 nautical miles (5,650 km)	5 d, 12 h, 29 m	23.02 knots (42.63 km/h)
Deutschland	German Empire	1901	26 July – 1 August	Hapag	Cherbourg	Sandy Hook	3,141 nautical miles (5,817 km)	5 d, 16 h, 12 m	23.06 knots (42.71 km/h)
Kronprinz Wilhelm	German Empire	1902	10–16 September	NDL	Cherbourg	Sandy Hook	3,047 nautical miles (5,643 km)	5 d, 11 h, 57 m	23.09 knots (42.76 km/h)
Deutschland	German Empire	1903	2–8 September	Hapag	Cherbourg	Sandy Hook	3,054 nautical miles (5,656 km)	5 d, 11 h, 54 m	23.15 knots (42.87 km/h)
Lusitania		1907	6–10 October	Cunard	Queenstown	Sandy Hook	2,780 nautical miles (5,150 km)	4 d, 19 h, 52 m	23.99 knots (44.43 km/h)
Lusitania		1908	17–21 May	Cunard	Queenstown	Sandy Hook	2,889 nautical miles (5,350 km)	4 d, 20 h, 22 m	24.83 knots (45.99 km/h)
Lusitania		1908	5–10 July	Cunard	Queenstown	Sandy Hook	2,891 nautical miles (5,354 km)	4 d, 19 h, 36 m	25.01 knots (46.32 km/h)
Lusitania		1909	8–12 August	Cunard	Queenstown	Ambrose Light	2,890 nautical miles (5,350 km)	4 d, 16 h, 40 m	25.65 knots (47.50 km/h)
Mauretania		1909	26–30 September	Cunard	Queenstown	Ambrose Light	2,784 nautical miles (5,156 km)	4 d, 10 h, 51 m	26.06 knots (48.26 km/h)
Bremen		1929	17–22 July	NDL	Cherbourg	Ambrose Light	3,164 nautical miles (5,860 km)	4 d, 17 h, 42 m	27.83 knots (51.54 km/h)
Europa		1930	20–25 March	NDL	Cherbourg	Ambrose Light	3,157 nautical miles (5,847 km)	4 d, 17 h, 6 m	27.91 knots (51.69 km/h)
Bremen	German Reich	1933	27 June – 2 July	NDL	Cherbourg	Ambrose Light	3,149 nautical miles (5,832 km)	4 d, 16 h, 48 m	27.92 knots (51.71 km/h)
Rex	Italy	1933	11–16 August	Italian	Gibraltar	Ambrose Light	3,181 nautical miles (5,891 km)	4 d, 13 h, 58 m	28.92 knots (53.56 km/h)
Normandie		1935	30 May – 3 June	CGT	Bishop Rock	Ambrose Light	2,971 nautical miles (5,502 km)	4 d, 3 h, 2 m	29.98 knots (55.52 km/h)
Queen Mary		1936	20–24 August	C-WS	Bishop Rock	Ambrose Light	2,907 nautical miles (5,384 km)	4 d, 0 h, 27 m	30.14 knots (55.82 km/h)
Normandie		1937	29 July – 2 August	CGT	Bishop Rock	Ambrose Light	2,906 nautical miles (5,382 km)	3 d, 23 h, 2 m	30.58 knots (56.63 km/h)
Queen Mary		1938	4–8 August	C-WS	Bishop Rock	Ambrose Light	2,907 nautical miles (5,384 km)	3 d, 21 h, 48 m	30.99 knots (57.39 km/h)
United States		1952	11–15 July	USL	Bishop Rock	Ambrose Light	2,906 nautical miles (5,382 km)	3 d, 12 h, 12 m	34.51 knots (63.91 km/h)

=== Eastbound record breakers ===
Ship	Flag	Year	Dates	Line	From	To	Distance	Days, hours, minutes	Speed
Sirius		1838	1–19 May	British & American	New York	Falmouth	3,159 nautical miles (5,850 km)	15 d 0 h	7.31 knots (13.54 km/h)
Great Western		1838	7–22 May	GW	New York	Avonmouth	3,218 nautical miles (5,960 km)	14 d, 15 h, 59 m	9.14 knots (16.93 km/h)
Great Western		1838	25 June – 8 July	GW	New York	Avonmouth	3,099 nautical miles (5,739 km)	12 d, 16 h, 34 m	10.17 knots (18.83 km/h)
Britannia		1841	4–14 August	Cunard	Halifax	Liverpool	2,610 nautical miles (4,830 km)	9 d, 21 h, 44 m	10.98 knots (20.33 km/h)
Great Western		1842	28 April – 11 May	GW	New York	Liverpool	3,248 nautical miles (6,015 km)	12 d, 7 h, 30 m	10.99 knots (20.35 km/h)
Columbia		1843	4–14 April	Cunard	Halifax	Liverpool	2,534 nautical miles (4,693 km)	9 d, 12 h, 0 m	11.11 knots (20.58 km/h)
Hibernia		1843	18–27 May	Cunard	Halifax	Liverpool	2,534 nautical miles (4,693 km)	9 d, 10 h, 44 m	11.18 knots (20.71 km/h)
Hibernia		1843	18–27 July	Cunard	Halifax	Liverpool	2,534 nautical miles (4,693 km)	8 d, 22 h, 44 m	11.80 knots (21.85 km/h)
Canada		1849	19–28 July	Cunard	Halifax	Liverpool	2,534 nautical miles (4,693 km)	8 d, 12 h, 44 m	12.38 knots (22.93 km/h)
Pacific		1851	10–20 May	Collins	New York	Liverpool	3,078 nautical miles (5,700 km)	9 d, 20 h, 14 m	13.03 knots (24.13 km/h)
Arctic		1852	7–17 February	Collins	New York	Liverpool	3,051 nautical miles (5,650 km)	9 d, 17 h, 15 m	13.06 knots (24.19 km/h)
Persia		1856	2–12 April	Cunard	Sandy Hook	Liverpool	3,048 nautical miles (5,645 km)	9 d, 10 h, 22 m	13.46 knots (24.93 km/h)
Persia		1856	14–23 May	Cunard	Sandy Hook	Liverpool	3,048 nautical miles (5,645 km)	9 d, 3 h, 24 m	13.89 knots (25.72 km/h)
Persia		1856	6–15 August	Cunard	Sandy Hook	Liverpool	3,046 nautical miles (5,641 km)	8 d, 23 h, 19 m	14.15 knots (26.21 km/h)
Scotia		1863	16–24 December	Cunard	New York	Queenstown	2,800 nautical miles (5,200 km)	8 d, 5 h, 42 m	14.16 knots (26.22 km/h)
City of Brussels		1869	4–12 December	Inman	Sandy Hook	Queenstown	2,780 nautical miles (5,150 km)	7 d, 20 h, 33 m	14.74 knots (27.30 km/h)
Baltic		1873	11–19 January	W.Star	Sandy Hook	Queenstown	2,840 nautical miles (5,260 km)	7 d, 20 h, 9 m	15.09 knots (27.95 km/h)
City of Berlin		1875	2–10 October	Inman	Sandy Hook	Queenstown	2,820 nautical miles (5,220 km)	7 d, 15 h, 28 m	15.37 knots (28.47 km/h)
Germanic		1876	5–13 February	W.Star	Sandy Hook	Queenstown	2,894 nautical miles (5,360 km)	7 d, 15 h, 17 m	15.79 knots (29.24 km/h)
Britannic		1876	16–24 December	W.Star	Sandy Hook	Queenstown	2,892 nautical miles (5,356 km)	7 d, 12 h, 41 m	15.94 knots (29.52 km/h)
Arizona		1879	22–29 July	Guion	Sandy Hook	Queenstown	2,810 nautical miles (5,200 km)	7 d, 8 h, 11 m	15.96 knots (29.56 km/h)
Alaska		1882	30 May – 6 June	Guion	Sandy Hook	Queenstown	2,791 nautical miles (5,169 km)	6 d, 22 h, 0 m	16.81 knots (31.13 km/h)
Alaska		1882	12–19 September	Guion	Sandy Hook	Queenstown	2,781 nautical miles (5,150 km)	6 d, 18 h, 37 m	17.10 knots (31.67 km/h)
Oregon		1884	29 March – 5 April	Guion	Sandy Hook	Queenstown	2,916 nautical miles (5,400 km)	7 d, 2 h, 18 m	17.12 knots (31.71 km/h)
Oregon		1884	26 April – 3 May	Guion	Sandy Hook	Queenstown	2,916 nautical miles (5,400 km)	6 d, 16 h, 57 m	18.09 knots (33.50 km/h)
Oregon		1884	30 July – 6 August	Cunard	Sandy Hook	Queenstown	2,853 nautical miles (5,284 km)	6 d, 12 h, 54 m	18.18 knots (33.67 km/h)
Oregon		1884	3–10 September	Cunard	Sandy Hook	Queenstown	2,853 nautical miles (5,284 km)	6 d, 11 h, 9 m	18.39 knots (34.06 km/h)
Etruria		1885	1–7 August	Cunard	Sandy Hook	Queenstown	2,822 nautical miles (5,226 km)	6 d, 9 h, 0 m	18.44 knots (34.15 km/h)
Etruria		1888	7–14 July	Cunard	Sandy Hook	Queenstown	2,981 nautical miles (5,521 km)	6 d, 4 h, 50 m	19.36 knots (35.85 km/h)
City of Paris		1889	15–22 May	Inman	Sandy Hook	Queenstown	2,894 nautical miles (5,360 km)	6 d, 0 h, 29 m	20.03 knots (37.10 km/h)
City of New York		1892	17–23 August	Inman	Sandy Hook	Queenstown	2,814 nautical miles (5,212 km)	5 d, 19 h, 57 m	20.11 knots (37.24 km/h)
Campania		1893	6–12 May	Cunard	Sandy Hook	Queenstown	2,928 nautical miles (5,423 km)	5 d, 17 h, 27 m	21.30 knots (39.45 km/h)
Lucania		1894	6–12 May	Cunard	Sandy Hook	Queenstown	2,911 nautical miles (5,391 km)	5 d, 13 h, 28 m	21.81 knots (40.39 km/h)
Lucania		1894	2–8 June	Cunard	Sandy Hook	Queenstown	2,911 nautical miles (5,391 km)	5 d, 12 h, 59 m	21.90 knots (40.56 km/h)
Lucania		1895	18–24 May	Cunard	Sandy Hook	Queenstown	2,897 nautical miles (5,365 km)	5 d, 11 h, 40 m	22.00 knots (40.74 km/h)
Kaiser Wilhelm der Grosse	German Empire	1897	23–29 November	NDL	Sandy Hook	Needles	3,065 nautical miles (5,676 km)	5 d, 17 h, 23 m	22.33 knots (41.36 km/h)
Deutschland	German Empire	1900	18–24 July	Hapag	Sandy Hook	Eddystone	3,085 nautical miles (5,713 km)	5 d, 15 h, 5 m	22.84 knots (42.30 km/h)
Deutschland	German Empire	1900	4–10 September	Hapag	Sandy Hook	Eddystone	2,981 nautical miles (5,521 km)	5 d, 7 h, 38 m	23.36 knots (43.26 km/h)
Deutschland	German Empire	1901	13–19 June	Hapag	Sandy Hook	Eddystone	3,083 nautical miles (5,710 km)	5 d, 11 h, 51 m	23.38 knots (43.30 km/h)
Deutschland	German Empire	1901	10–17 July	Hapag	Sandy Hook	Eddystone	3,082 nautical miles (5,708 km)	5 d, 11 h, 5 m	23.51 knots (43.54 km/h)
Kaiser Wilhelm II	German Empire	1904	14–20 June	NDL	Sandy Hook	Eddystone	3,112 nautical miles (5,763 km)	5 d, 11 h, 58 m	23.58 knots (43.67 km/h)
Lusitania		1907	19–24 October	Cunard	Sandy Hook	Queenstown	2,807 nautical miles (5,199 km)	4 d, 22 h, 53 m	23.61 knots (43.73 km/h)
Mauretania		1907	30 November–5 December	Cunard	Beady Hook	Queenstown	2,807 nautical miles (5,199 km)	4 d, 22 h, 33 m	23.69 knots (43.87 km/h)
Mauretania		1908	25–30 January	Cunard	Sandy Hook	Queenstown	2,932 nautical miles (5,430 km)	5 d, 2 h, 41 m	23.90 knots (44.26 km/h)
Mauretania		1908	7–12 March	Cunard	Sandy Hook	Queenstown	2,932 nautical miles (5,430 km)	5 d, 0 h, 5 m	24.42 knots (45.23 km/h)
Mauretania		1909	3–8 February	Cunard	Ambrose	Queenstown,	2,930 nautical miles (5,430 km)	4 d, 20 h, 27 m	25.16 knots (46.60 km/h)
Mauretania		1909	17–22 March	Cunard	Ambrose	Queenstown	2,934 nautical miles (5,434 km)	4 d, 18 h, 35 m	25.61 knots (47.43 km/h)
Mauretania		1909	5–10 May	Cunard	Ambrose	Queenstown	2,934 nautical miles (5,434 km)	4 d, 18 h, 11 m	25.70 knots (47.60 km/h)
Mauretania		1909	16–21 June	Cunard	Ambrose	Queenstown	2,933 nautical miles (5,432 km)	4 d, 17 h, 21 m	25.88 knots (47.93 km/h)
Mauretania		1924	20–25 August	Cunard	Ambrose	Cherbourg	3,198 nautical miles (5,923 km)	5 d, 1 h, 49 m	26.25 knots (48.62 km/h)
Bremen		1929	27 July – 1 August	NDL	Ambrose	Eddystone	3,084 nautical miles (5,712 km)	4 d, 14 h, 30 m	27.91 knots (51.69 km/h)
Bremen	German Reich	1933	10–15 June	NDL	Ambrose	Cherbourg	3,199 nautical miles (5,925 km)	4 d, 16 h, 15 m	28.51 knots (52.80 km/h)
Normandie		1935	7–11 June	CGT	Ambrose	Bishop Rock	3,015 nautical miles (5,584 km)	4 d, 3 h, 25 m	30.31 knots (56.13 km/h)
Queen Mary		1936	26–30 August	C-WS	Ambrose	Bishop Rock	2,939 nautical miles (5,443 km)	3 d, 23 h, 57 m	30.63 knots (56.73 km/h)
Normandie		1937	18–22 March	CGT	Ambrose	Bishop Rock	2,967 nautical miles (5,495 km)	4 d, 0 h, 6 m	30.99 knots (57.39 km/h)
Normandie		1937	4–8 August	CGT	Ambrose	Bishop Rock	2,936 nautical miles (5,437 km)	3 d, 22 h, 7 m	31.20 knots (57.78 km/h)
Queen Mary		1938	10–14 August	C-WS	Ambrose	Bishop Rock	2,938 nautical miles (5,441 km)	3 d, 20 h, 42 m	31.69 knots (58.69 km/h)
United States		1952	3–7 July	USL	Ambrose	Bishop Rock	2,942 nautical miles (5,449 km)	3 d, 10 h, 40 m	35.59 knots (65.91 km/h)

== See also ==
- Transatlantic sailing record
- Ocean Rowing Society
- Orteig Prize
