= List of shipwrecks in June 1878 =

The list of shipwrecks in June 1878 includes ships sunk, foundered, grounded, or otherwise lost during June 1878.

== 1 June ==
List of shipwrecks: 1 June 1878
Ship	State	Description
HMS Elk	Royal Navy	The Beacon-class gunvessel was driven ashore at Punta Lara, Argentina. She was refloated the next day.
Idaho	United Kingdom	The passenger ship, on a voyage from New York, United States to Liverpool, Lancashire via Queenstown, County Cork, after delivering mail to Queenstown, ran aground on Connigmore rocks off the Saltee Islands, County Wexford. Idaho carried 151 passengers and a mixed cargo of fifty-one horses, some cattle and a 1,000 tons of beef. She drifted off the rock and sank within twenty minutes. Her passengers and crew were rescued.
Loch Ard	United Kingdom	The clipper ran onto rocks in fog and sank at Muttonbird Island, Victoria with the loss of 52 of the 54 people on board. She was on a voyage from London to Melbourne, Victoria.

== 2 June ==
List of shipwrecks: 2 June 1878
Ship	State	Description
Arab	United Kingdom	The steamship struck a sunken wreck and was damaged. She was on a voyage from Grimsby, Lincolnshire to Nicolaieff, Russia. She put back to Grimsby.
Blackbird	Victoria	The ship was wrecked at Port Albert. Her crew were rescued.
Gunga	Flag unknown	The steamship ran aground in the Cayaijanes, Spanish East Indies. She was on a voyage from Hong Kong to Cooktown, Queensland. She was refloated.

== 4 June ==
List of shipwrecks: 4 June 1878
Ship	State	Description
Jacob Aal	Denmark	The schooner ran aground on the Wresen Sandbank. She was on a voyage from West Hartlepool, County Durham, United Kingdom to Flensburg, Germany. She was refloated and taken in to Nyborg.

== 5 June ==
List of shipwrecks: 5 June 1878
Ship	State	Description
Afton	United Kingdom	The steamship ran aground on the Crow Rock.
Palermo	Italy	The schooner was wrecked near Balestrate, Sicily.

== 6 June ==
List of shipwrecks: 6 June 1878
Ship	State	Description
Chrysolite	United Kingdom	The steamship suffered an onboard explosion and caught fire at Newport, Monmouthshire. Four of her crew were killed.
Garonne	United Kingdom	The steamship ran aground in the Red Sea off Ras Hafun, Majeerteen Sultanate. She was on a voyage from Adelaide, South Australia to London. She was refloated between 8 and 11 June and resumed her voyage.

== 7 June ==
List of shipwrecks: 7 June 1878
Ship	State	Description
Colibri	Italy	The brig put in to Falmouth, Cornwall, United Kingdom on fire. She was on a voyage from Rockhampton, Queensland to London, United Kingdom.
Jane Law	United Kingdom	The barque was driven ashore at Kingsdown, Kent. She was on a voyage from Dundee, Forfarshire to Cardiff, Glamorgan. She was refloated with assistance and taken in tow for the English Channel.
Rival	United Kingdom	The ship ran aground on the Goodwin Sands, Kent. She was on a voyage from Cardiff to Kronstadt, Russia. She was refloated with assistance and taken in to The Downs.
Stralna	Russia	The steamship was driven ashore in the Gulf of Finland near "Sommar". She was on a voyage from Kronstadt to London.
Wildfire	Royal Navy	The paddle steamer collided with HMS Cherub (Royal Navy) in the River Medway and was damaged.

== 8 June ==
List of shipwrecks: 8 June 1878
Ship	State	Description
Bernice	Netherlands	The steamship ran aground at St. Margaret's Bay, Kent, United Kingdom. She was on a voyage from Amsterdam, North Holland to Lisbon, Portugal. She was refloated and taken in to The Downs.
Carolina	United States	The ship ran aground at Alloa, Clackmannanshire, Scotland, and sprang a leak. She was on a voyage from Baltimore to Alloa.
Norma	United Kingdom	The steamship ran aground on the Cradle Rock, in the Channel Islands. She was refloated and taken in to Saint Helier, Jersey.
W. N. H. Clements	United States	The ship was driven ashore at New York. She was on a voyage from New York to Cork, Ireland.

== 9 June ==
List of shipwrecks: 9 June 1878
Ship	State	Description
Unnamed	United Kingdom	The smack was run into by the steamship Viceroy (United Kingdom) and sank in the Clyde upstream of Port Glasgow, Renfrewshire. Her crew were rescued.

== 10 June ==
List of shipwrecks: 10 June 1878
Ship	State	Description
Fortuna	Norway	The barque was driven ashore near Port Kunda, Russia. Her crew were rescued. She was on a voyage from Narva, Russia to South Alloa, Clackmannanshire, Scotland.
Kaiateur	Flag unknown	The steamship ran aground at Kertch, Russia. She was on a voyage from Hartlepool, County Durham, United Kingdom to Kertch. She was refloated.
Maria	Spain	The barque collided with the steamship Aurora (United Kingdom) and sank in the Thames Estuary off Southend-on-Sea, Essex, United Kingdom. Each vessel lost a crew member. Maria was on a voyage from Havana, Cuba to London, United Kingdom.

== 11 June ==
List of shipwrecks: 11 June 1878
Ship	State	Description
Aid	United Kingdom	The sloop was driven ashore at the mouth of the River Ythan and was wrecked. Both crew were rescued by a pilot boat.
Rose des Alps	France	The lugger was wrecked on the coast of Iceland. Her eighteen crew were rescued by the steamship Diana (Denmark).

== 12 June ==
List of shipwrecks: 12 June 1878
Ship	State	Description
James Groves	United Kingdom	The steamship ran aground at Yenikale, Russia. She was on a voyage from Hartlepool, County Durham to Kertch, Russia. She was refloated on 14 June.

== 13 June ==
List of shipwrecks: 13 June 1878
Ship	State	Description
Ethan Allan	United States	The ship was driven ashore at the Raffles Lighthouse, Straits Settlements. She was on a voyage from New York City to Manila, Spanish East Indies. She was refloated and put in to Singapore, Straits Settlements for repairs.
Jenny Otto	United Kingdom	The steamship ran aground at Dover, Kent. She was on a voyage from Kurrachee, India to Dover.

== 14 June ==
List of shipwrecks: 14 June 1878
Ship	State	Description
Alphens	United Kingdom	The steam barge was severely damaged by fire at Penzance, Cornwall. She was on a voyage from Sunderland, County Durham to Alloa, Clackmannanshire.
Vernon	United Kingdom	The steamship was driven ashore near Sandhamn, Sweden. She was on a voyage from Stockholm, Sweden to Riga, Russia. She was refloated and resumed her voyage.
Westbourne	United Kingdom	The steamship was driven ashore near Lake Turkos, Ottoman Empire. She was refloated on 20 June and taken in to Constantinople, Ottoman Empire.

== 15 June ==
List of shipwrecks: 15 June 1878
Ship	State	Description
Henry Coxon	United Kingdom	The steamship was sighted off Copenhagen, Denmark whilst on a voyage from Riga, Russia to Grimsby, Lincolnshire. Presumed foundered with the loss of all twenty crew. A lifeboat from the ship was found in the North Sea in September.
Ocean Maid	United Kingdom	The schooner collided with the steamship Montana (United Kingdom) and sank in the River Mersey. Her five crew were rescued. Ocean Maid was on a voyage from Liverpool, Lancashire to Fraserburgh, Aberdeenshire. She was subsequently refloated and beached.
Olga R.	Austria-Hungary	The barque ran aground at Queenstown, County Cork, Ireland. She was on a voyage from Queenstown to Cork.
Olive	United Kingdom	The schooner ran aground and was wrecked at Buckie, Moray. Her crew were rescued.
Vintage	United Kingdom	The brigantine ran aground on the Maplin Sand, in the North Sea off the coast of Essex. She was on a voyage from South Shields, County Durham to London. She was refloated and resumed her voyage.

== 16 June ==
List of shipwrecks: 16 June 1878
Ship	State	Description
Helen	New Zealand	The 23-ton schooner foundered off the northern tip of Great Barrier Island during a storm.

== 17 June ==
List of shipwrecks: 17 June 1878
Ship	State	Description
Francoisier	France	The ship collided with Alliance (United Kingdom) at Havre de Grâce, Seine-Inférieure and was severely damaged. Several passengers were severely wounded.
Joshua	United Kingdom	The barque was wrecked at Beypore, India with the loss of seven of her crew.
Chile	United Kingdom	The barque was struck by a wave and severely damaged in the Pacific Ocean. She was on a voyage from San Francisco, California, United States to London. She put in to Melville Sound, Chile on 2 July. A boat was despatched the next day for Punta Arenas, it was picked up by the steamship Potosi (Chile). The corvette Magallanes (navy) was despatched and towed her in to Punta Arenas, where she arrived on 3 August. Subsequently condemned and sold to the Chilean Navy for use as a hulk.
Marittimo	Italy	The barque ran aground at Goole, Yorkshire, United Kingdom. She was on a voyage from Goole to Naples. She was refloated and put back to Goole.
Minniehaha	United Kingdom	The schooner was driven ashore and wrecked at Beddingestrand, Sweden. She was on a voyage from Hamburg, Germany to Sundsvall, Sweden.
Onni	Norway	The ship ran aground on Inchgarvie, in the Firth of Forth and broke her back.

== 19 June ==
List of shipwrecks: 19 June 1878
Ship	State	Description
Mercury	Flag unknown	The ketch was lost in Spencer Gulf with her crew of two.
Monarch	(United Kingdom of Great Britain and Ireland) Jersey	The brig collided with Silbury (United Kingdom) in the River Thames and was severely damaged. She was on a voyage from London to Newcastle upon Tyne, Northumberland.

== 20 June ==
List of shipwrecks: 20 June 1878
Ship	State	Description
Hanna Christensen	Denmark	The schooner was wrecked at Thisted. Her crew were rescued. She was on a voyage from East Wemyss, Fife, United Kingdom to Horsens.
Unnamed	Netherlands	The barque ran aground at Hittarp, Sweden. She was refloated and resumed her voyage.

== 21 June ==
List of shipwrecks: 21 June 1878
Ship	State	Description
Leopard	United Kingdom	The ship ran aground off Gotland, Sweden. She was on a voyage from Kotka, Russia to Hull, Yorkshire. She was refloated and towed in to Stockholm, Sweden in a waterlogged condition.
Modena	United States	The schooner was abandoned at sea. Her crew were rescued.
Xantho	United Kingdom	The steamship ran aground on the Lantarupaal, in the Scheldt. She was on a voyage from Odesa, Russia to Antwerp, Belgium.

== 22 June ==
List of shipwrecks: 22 June 1878
Ship	State	Description
Helene	Germany	The barque was driven ashore on Öland, Sweden. She was on a voyage from Riga, Russia to an English port. Helene was refloated and taken in to Copenhagen, Denmark in a leaky condition. She was placed under repair.
Nor	Norway	The schooner was wrecked at Bahia, Brazil. She was on a voyage from Rio de Janeiro to Aracaju.

== 23 June ==
List of shipwrecks: 23 June 1878
Ship	State	Description
Confederate	Canada	The brig was run into by the barque Antwerp ( Canada) and sank off Brier Island, Nova Scotia with the loss of three of her crew. Survivors were rescued by Antwerp.
Norah Creina	United Kingdom	The paddle steamer ran aground at Drogheda, County Louth. She was refloated with assistance from the tug Black Eagle (United Kingdom).

== 24 June ==
List of shipwrecks: 24 June 1878
Ship	State	Description
Hydrabad	United Kingdom	Hydrabad The full-rigged ship was caught in a storm and beached at Waitarere Beach, New Zealand. All on board were rescued. She was on a voyage from Lyttelton, New Zealand to Adelaide, South Australia. She was refloated on 7 January 1879 with assistance from the steamship Glenelg (New Zealand) but was found to be severely leaky and was beached. She was then damaged by fire and was abandoned as a total loss.

== 25 June ==
List of shipwrecks: 25 June 1878
Ship	State	Description
Apollo, and Larry Bane	United Kingdom	The steamship Larry Bane collided with the steamship Apollo and sank in the Clyde at Bowling, Dunbartonshire. Her crew survived. Apollo was on a voyage from Glasgow, Renfrewshire to Barrow-in-Furness, Lancashire. She was severely damaged and put back to Glasgow.
Medora	United Kingdom	The brig foundered 32 nautical miles (59 km) north west of Cape St. Vincent, Portugal. Her crew were rescued by the schooner San José (Spain). Medora was on a voyage from Alexandria, Egypt to Falmouth, Cornwall.
Prospero	Canada	The schooner was wrecked on Scatarie Island, Nova Scotia.
Unnamed	United Kingdom	The schooner was driven ashore near Fishbourne, Isle of Wight.

== 26 June ==
List of shipwrecks: 26 June 1878
Ship	State	Description
Lady Don	New Zealand	The schooner (also reported as a brigantine) was driven off course and stranded at the mouth of the Waikato River. She was later refloated and is likely to be the same Lady Don wrecked in early 1881.
Peshtigo	United States	The barquentine was sunk in a collision with St. Andrews (United States) in Lake Michigan near Beaver Island.
St. Andrews	United States	The vessel was sunk in a collision with Peshtigo (United States) in Lake Michigan near Beaver Island.
Unnamed	United Kingdom	The flat was run into by the steamship Peshawur (India) and sank at "Atchiepore", India.

== 27 June ==
List of shipwrecks: 27 June 1878
Ship	State	Description
Dream	United Kingdom	The ship ran aground and sank at Alderney, Channel Islands. She was on a voyage from Portsmouth, Hampshire to Alderney.
P. C. Blanchard	United Kingdom	The ship was driven ashore at Penarth, Glamorgan. She was on a voyage from Antwerp, Belgium to Penarth.
Wild Rose	United Kingdom	The ship caught fire at Calcutta, India.

== 28 June ==
List of shipwrecks: 28 June 1878
Ship	State	Description
Aberystwyth	United Kingdom	The steamship ran aground on the Skullmartin Rock, off Ballywalter, County Down.
Garland	United Kingdom	The steamship ran aground. She was on a round trip from the Isle of Wight to Weymouth, Dorset. She was refloated and completed her voyage.
Neptune	Germany	The schooner collided with the schooner Mary Block (United Kingdom) and foundered in the English Channel with the loss of six of her eight crew. Survivors were rescued by Mary Block. Neptune was on a voyage from Elsfleth to Cardiff, Glamorgan, United Kingdom.
Stamford	United Kingdom	The steamship struck the Paganello Rock, off Point Margarita, Italy. She foundered on 1 July. Her crew were rescued. She was on a voyage from Messina, Sicily, Italy to Marseille, Bouches-du-Rhône, France.

== 29 June ==
List of shipwrecks: 29 June 1878
Ship	State	Description
Little Florrie	United Kingdom	The ship foundered off Land's End, Cornwall. She was on a voyage from Watchet, Somerset to Falmouth, Cornwall.

== 30 June ==
List of shipwrecks: 30 June 1878
Ship	State	Description
Charles Jackson	United Kingdom	The ship ran aground on Owen's Shoal. She was on a voyage from Demerara, British Guiana to Sunderland, County Durham. She was refloated and resumed her voyagea.
Lady Elizabeth	United Kingdom	The barque ran aground and sank at Bickley Bay, Australia.

== Unknown date ==
List of shipwrecks: Unknown date in June 1878
Ship	State	Description
Cambrian	United Kingdom	The ship was abandoned in the Pacific Ocean before 17 June with some loss of life.
Charlotte	United Kingdom	The schooner ran aground on the Pennington Spit, off the coast of Hampshire.
Cumbrae	United Kingdom	The steamship struck rocks off the coast of Iceland. She was on a voyage from Iceland to Leith, Lothian. She completed her voyage in a leaky condition.
Farragut	United States	The schooner was wrecked at the mouth of the Tonalá River.
Glenrosa	United Kingdom	The steamship was driven ashore at Fahludd, Gotland, Sweden. She was on a voyage from Riga, Russia to Leith, Lothian.
Goldstream	United Kingdom	The brig was wrecked at the mouth of the Tonalá River.
Haabet	Norway	The barque was driven ashore at "Corp". She was refloated with assistance and taken in to Copenhagen, Denmark for repairs.
Jennie R. Deverty	United States	The barque was driven ashore at Bassa, Liberia before 4 June. She was on a voyage from Africa to Boston, Massachusetts. She was refloated and put in to a port in Sierra Leone.
Knight of Snowdon	United Kingdom	The barque was wrecked on Punta Santiago Island, in the Pacific Ocean before 18 June. Her crew were rescued. She was on a voyage from Newcastle, New South Wales to Manila, Spanish East Indies.
Mary	United Kingdom	The brigantine was lost at sea. She was on a voyage from Antigua to the Newfoundland Colony.
Moderator	United Kingdom	The schooner foundered in the Bristol Channel. She was on a voyage from Cardiff, Glamorgan to Highbridge, Somerset.
Polarstjernen	Flag unknown	The ship collided with the steamship Hermod (Denmark) in the Baltic Sea between 24 and 26 June and was severely damaged. She was towed in to Bolderāja, Russia by Hermod.
Royal Dane	United Kingdom	The ship was abandoned in the Pacific Ocean. Her crew were rescued.
RMS Tasmanian	United Kingdom	The steamship was driven ashore and wrecked at Ponce, Puerto Rico. Attempts to refloat her were abandoned on 23 June. She capsized and her crew were rescued by the steamship Tourmaline (United Kingdom)
Thomas Brocklebank	United Kingdom	The ship was wrecked on the Isla de la Juventud, Cuba. She was on a voyage from Montego Bay, Jamaica to Liverpool, Lancashire.
Vintage	United Kingdom	The brigantine was driven ashore at Shoeburyness, Essex before 15 June. She was on a voyage from Seaham, County Durham to London. She was refloated and resumed her voyage.
Four unnamed vessels	Flags unknown	The ships were wrecked on the coast of Iceland before 11 June.
