= SS Arizona =

Record breaking British passenger liner, later a US military ship

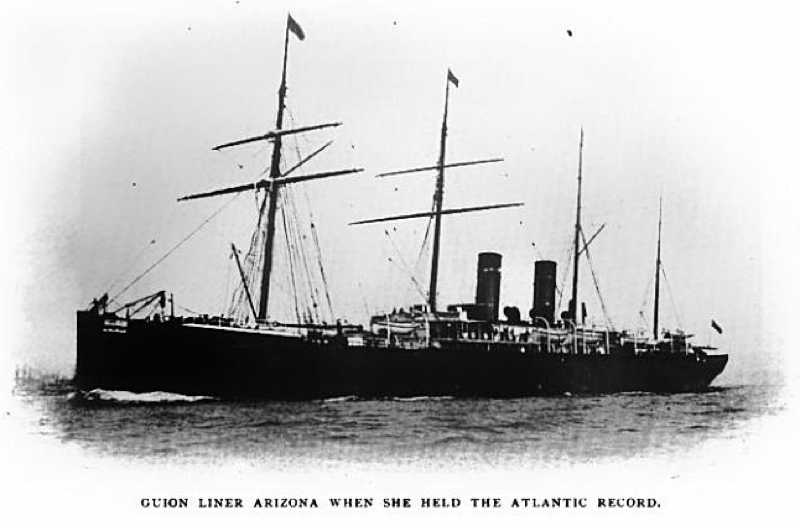
- Arizona when she held Atlantic Record.

History

United Kingdom
- Name: Arizona
- Owner: Guion Line
- Port of registry: Liverpool
- Builder: John Elder & Co, Govan
- Yard number: 222
- Laid down: 1879
- Launched: 10 March 1879
- Identification: UK official number 81271
- Fate: Broken up May 1926
- Notes: Renamed Hancock in 1898

General characteristics
- Type: Ocean liner
- Tonnage: 5,146 GRT, 2,928 NRT
- Length: 450.2 ft (137.2 m)
- Beam: 45.4 ft (13.8 m)
- Depth: 35.7 ft (10.9 m)
- Installed power: 1,200 NHP
- Propulsion: Single screw; 1879: Compound steam engine; 1898: Triple expansion steam engine
- Sail plan: Four masts
- Speed: 15 knots (28 km/h)

Arizona was a record breaking British passenger liner that was the first of the Guion Line's Atlantic Greyhounds on the Liverpool-Queenstown-New York route. One nautical historian called Arizona "a souped up transatlantic hot rod." Entering service in 1879, she was the prototype for Atlantic express liners until the Inman Line introduced its twin screw City of New York in 1889. The Arizona type liner is generally considered as unsuccessful because too much was sacrificed for speed. Laid up in 1894 when Guion stopped sailings, Arizona was sold four years later and briefly employed in the Pacific until she was acquired by the US Government for service in the Spanish–American War. As the US Navy's Hancock she continued trooping through World War I, and was scrapped in 1926.

== Development and design ==
Starting in 1866, the Guion Line was successful in the Liverpool-Queenstown-New York steerage trade. In 1875, Guion began commissioning express liners to compete for first class business, but its first two ships were total failures. William Pearce, the controlling partner of the John Elder shipyard, was convinced that a crack steamer that carried only passengers and light freight could be profitable because she would attract more passengers and spend less time in port. When Cunard rejected his proposal, Pearce offered his idea to the Guion line at a bargain price of £140,000 at a time when express liners typically cost £200,000. He also agreed to share the initial costs. Stephen Guion, managing director of the line, personally owned the new vessel.

As completed, Arizona appeared similar to White Star's Germanic, the current holder of the Blue Riband, but with greater power. Her engine produced 6,400 indicated horsepower, 1,400 more than Germanic. Arizona's six double-ended boilers and 39 furnaces consumed 135 tons of coal per day, considerably more than her White Star rival. She also had less room for cargo and steerage passengers.

Because of her high power, Arizona was an uncomfortable ship. However, publicity at the time tried to hide this by describing the luxury of her interior. Her saloon "contained six long tables, with revolving chairs. A large dome-like aperture, with a skylight at the top, rose from the centre of the saloon, and was crossed by beams, supported by small pillars of polished wood, upon which were placed plants and flowers. The saloon extended the entire width of the vessel, and contained a fine piano at the forward end, and a library at the after end. The state-rooms were elegantly upholstered, and contained every facility for comfort. Pneumatic bells connected all the state-rooms with the steward's pantry, which was situated just aft the main saloon. A richly-furnished ladies' boudoir was on the promenade deck, just aft of the forward wheel-house."

== Service history ==
Arizona's bow after her 1879 collision with an iceberg.

Shortly after her maiden voyage on 31 May 1879, Arizona won the eastbound record for a Sandy Hook-Queenstown run of seven days, eight hours, 11 minutes (15.96 knots). However, despite her greater power and coal consumption, she failed to take the westbound Blue Riband record from Germanic.

On 7 November 1879, Arizona suffered a collision with an iceberg en route to Liverpool. Stephen Guion was on board with two of his nieces. It was found that the ship was holding an insufficient watch in the bow, with most of the deck crew positioned on or around the bridge. Fortunately, while she was going at full speed, the ship's top speed was only about 15 knots, so the damage was not threatening. As such, she remained afloat and was able to proceed to St. John's where she underwent temporary repairs before returning to Scotland. Guion advertised this near disaster as proof of Arizona's strength.

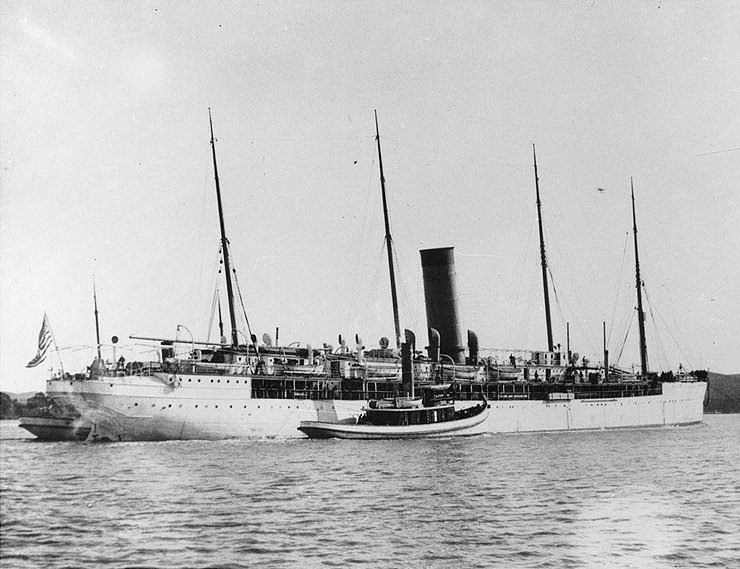
In 1897, Arizona was rebuilt with one funnel and served the US Government as the USAT and USS Hancock until after the First World War.

While uncomfortable, Arizona proved popular with American passengers because the Guion Line was majority-owned by Americans.

Stephen Guion died in December 1885, and the line was reorganized as a public stock corporation to settle the estate. The company did not invest in new units and by 1894 when Guion stopped sailings, Arizona and her running mate, Alaska of 1881 were hopelessly outpaced by the latest twin-screw liners from Cunard, White Star and Inman.

It was on Arizona that Oscar Wilde first sailed to America, arriving in New York on 2 January 1882. On 23 October 1882 he welcomed his friend Lillie Langtry on her arrival in New York on Arizona.

On 13 January 1887, a schooner collided with Arizona in the River Mersey and sank. Her crew were rescued by Arizona.

On 26 July 1887, she rescued the eight crew of the British brig Arthur, which foundered in the Atlantic Ocean.

On 29 May 1888, she rescued the passengers and crew of the British barque Henry James, which had been wrecked on a reef off Palmyra Island on 16 April whilst on a voyage from Newcastle, New South Wales to San Francisco, California, United States.

Arizona was laid up in Scotland until 1897 when she was sold to a British-flagged San Francisco-China service. She was extensively rebuilt and her two funnels were replaced with one enormous funnel that dominated her profile. After a few Pacific voyages, Arizona was sold to the War Department and used designated US Army Transport (USAT) Arizona.

=== Spanish–American War service ===
In 1898, USAT Arizona was refitted and new triple-expansion steam engines replaced her old compound engines in preparation for the San Francisco-to-China route. On 16 July 1898 Arizona was purchased from the Northern Pacific Railway Company by the US Army for $600,000.

USAT Arizona transported the following United States Volunteers (USV) and Regular Army units from Honolulu, Territory of Hawaii to Manila, Philippines as part of the 5th (US) Philippine Expeditionary Force in the Spanish–American War:

- 1st Colorado (National Guard) Infantry Regiment, USV (1st Battalion, 2nd Battalion and Company C).
- 1st Nebraska (National Guard) Infantry Regiment, USV (part).
- 10th Pennsylvania (National Guard) Infantry Regiment, USV (part).
- 18th US Infantry, Companies I, K, L, M.

On January 24, 1902, the ship transported part of the 22nd Infantry home to the States from the Philippine–American War and Moro Rebellion, arriving in San Francisco on February 25. It sailed with the USAT Rosecrans.

In 1902, she was acquired by the US Navy for use as a receiving ship at the Brooklyn Navy Yard and commissioned as USS Hancock. She served as a troopship in the First World War and continued in various duties until she was sold for scrapping in May 1926.

== See also ==
- More Ships Built in Govan

Records
Preceded by Britannic	Blue Riband (Eastbound record); 1879–1882	Succeeded by Alaska
