= John Stanton Williams =

John Stanton Williams (8 October 1814 – 14 November 1876) with Stephen Barker Guion owned and operated the Williams & Guion Black Star Line.

He was born in 1814 and married Mary Maclay Pentz (c. 1810–1891). They owned a 121-acre (0.49 km^{2}) tract in Somerset, New Jersey, which was inherited by their son, Stephen Guion Williams, on February 28, 1891. He died in 1876.

== Stephen Guion Williams ==
Stephen Guion Williams earned the first Ph.D. from Columbia University in political science in 1883. By 1892 he was a practicing law in New York City. Tulipwood was built for him in 1892 and was the third house built by Williams family members on that site.

On November 9, 1914, he married Charlotte Grosvenor Wyeth.
