= Stephen Barker Guion =

Stephen Barker Guion (June 17, 1820 – December 20, 1885) with John Stanton Williams formed the Williams & Guion Black Star Line.

== Biography ==
He was born on June 17, 1820.

In 1848 with John Stanton Williams he started the Williams & Guion Black Star Line

He was ill starting in 1883 and he died on December 20, 1885, of apoplexy.
