= Oceanic-class ocean liner =

Iron-hulled ocean liner class

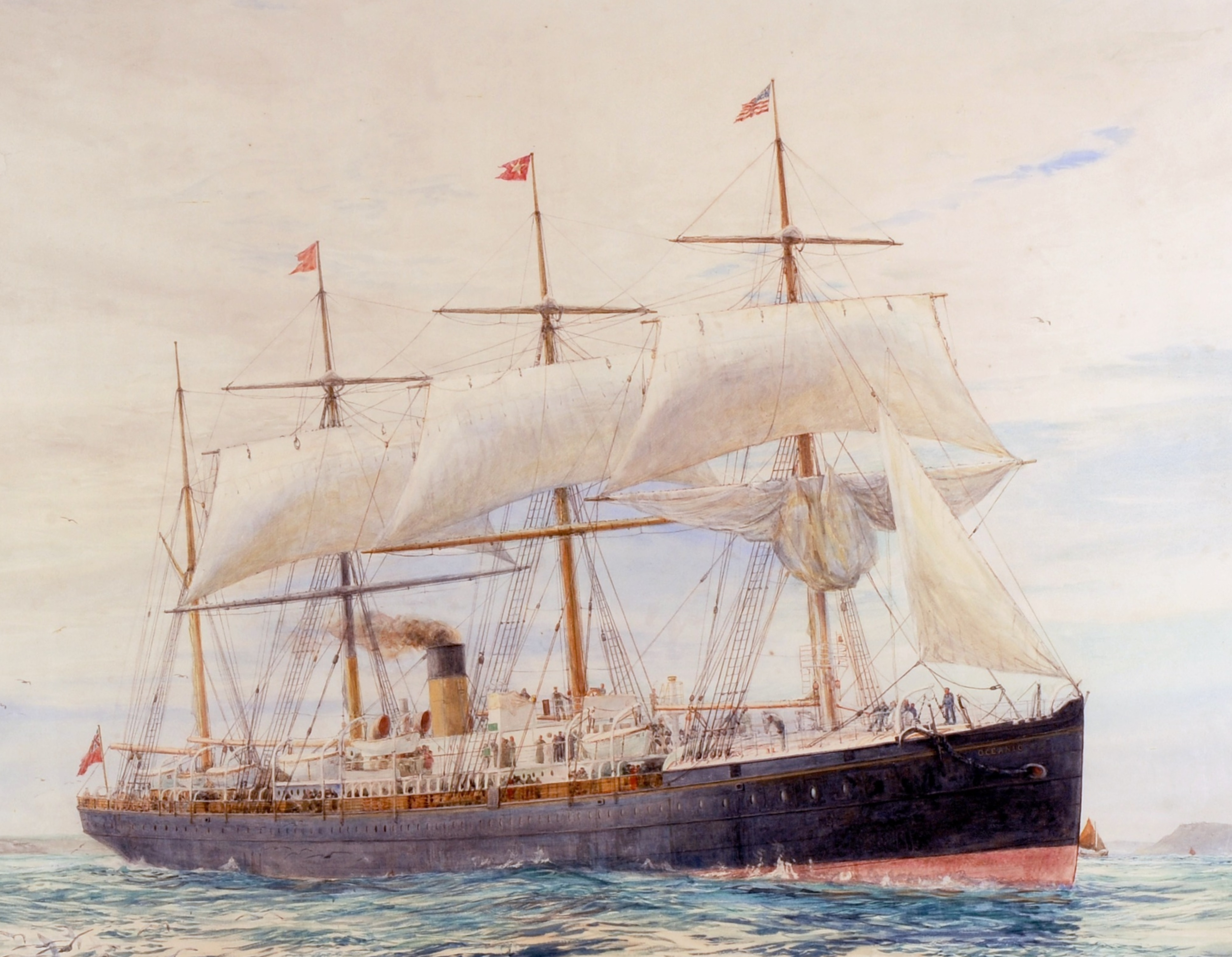
- SS Oceanic

Class overview
- Name: Oceanic class
- Builders: Harland & Wolff
- Operators: White Star Line
- Succeeded by: Britannic class
- Built: 1870–1872
- In service: 1871–1910
- Planned: 4
- Completed: 6
- Lost: 2
- Scrapped: 4

General characteristics
- Type: Ocean liner
- Tonnage: 3,707–3,888 GRT
- Length: 420 ft 2 in (128.07 m); to 452 ft 2 in (137.82 m)
- Beam: 40 ft 10 in (12.45 m)
- Installed power: 1,990 ihp (1,484 kW) - 3,500 ihp (2,610 kW)
- Propulsion: One four-cylinder compound reciprocating engine, single propeller
- Sail plan: Four-masted barque
- Speed: 14 knots (26 km/h; 16 mph) service speed
- Capacity: 166 first class, 1,000 steerage passengers
- Crew: 166

The Oceanic class were a group of six ocean liners built by Harland & Wolff at Belfast, for the White Star Line, for the transatlantic service. They were the company's first generation of steamships to serve the North Atlantic passenger trade, entering service between 1871 and 1872.

The class consisted of two groups, the first four ships were:

- SS Oceanic
- SS Atlantic
- SS Baltic
- SS Republic

These were followed by two further ships of similar design which were slightly larger than the first four, these were:

- SS Adriatic
- SS Celtic

The class has been hailed as a landmark in the development of ocean liner design. One member of the class, Atlantic, was lost early on in her career in a disaster which claimed the lives of more than 500 people; the remainder of the class however had long and successful careers.

== Background ==
The first company known as the White Star Line had been set up in 1845 by two Liverpool businessmen John Pilkington and Henry Threlfall Wilson, which had been largely concerned with transporting emigrants to Australia using sailing ships. In 1867 this first incarnation of the company entered liquidation after accumulating large debts. The name, goodwill and house flag of the White Star Line were sold to the shipowner Thomas Henry Ismay for £1,000.

Ismay had ambitions to own a fleet of steamships for the North Atlantic route, and in 1869 he met with the shipping financier Gustav Schwabe, who was the uncle of Gustav Wolff, the joint owner of the Harland & Wolff shipbuilding company in Belfast. Schwabe proposed to Ismay that he would provide the finance for Ismay's ships, on the condition that all of them would be built at his nephew's shipyard. Ismay agreed on the condition that Harland and Wolff would not build ships for his competitors. To this end the Oceanic Steam Navigation Company (OSNCo) was established in September that year, using the established White Star Line name as its public facing brand.

Immediately four steamships, which were to become the Oceanic class were ordered from Harland & Wolff, with the order later increased to six. In order for the company to compete against established shipping lines, such as the Cunard Line, the Inman Line, the Guion Line and the National Line, then on the lucrative North Atlantic run, the new steamers were intended to set new standards of passenger comfort and amenities.

== Features ==
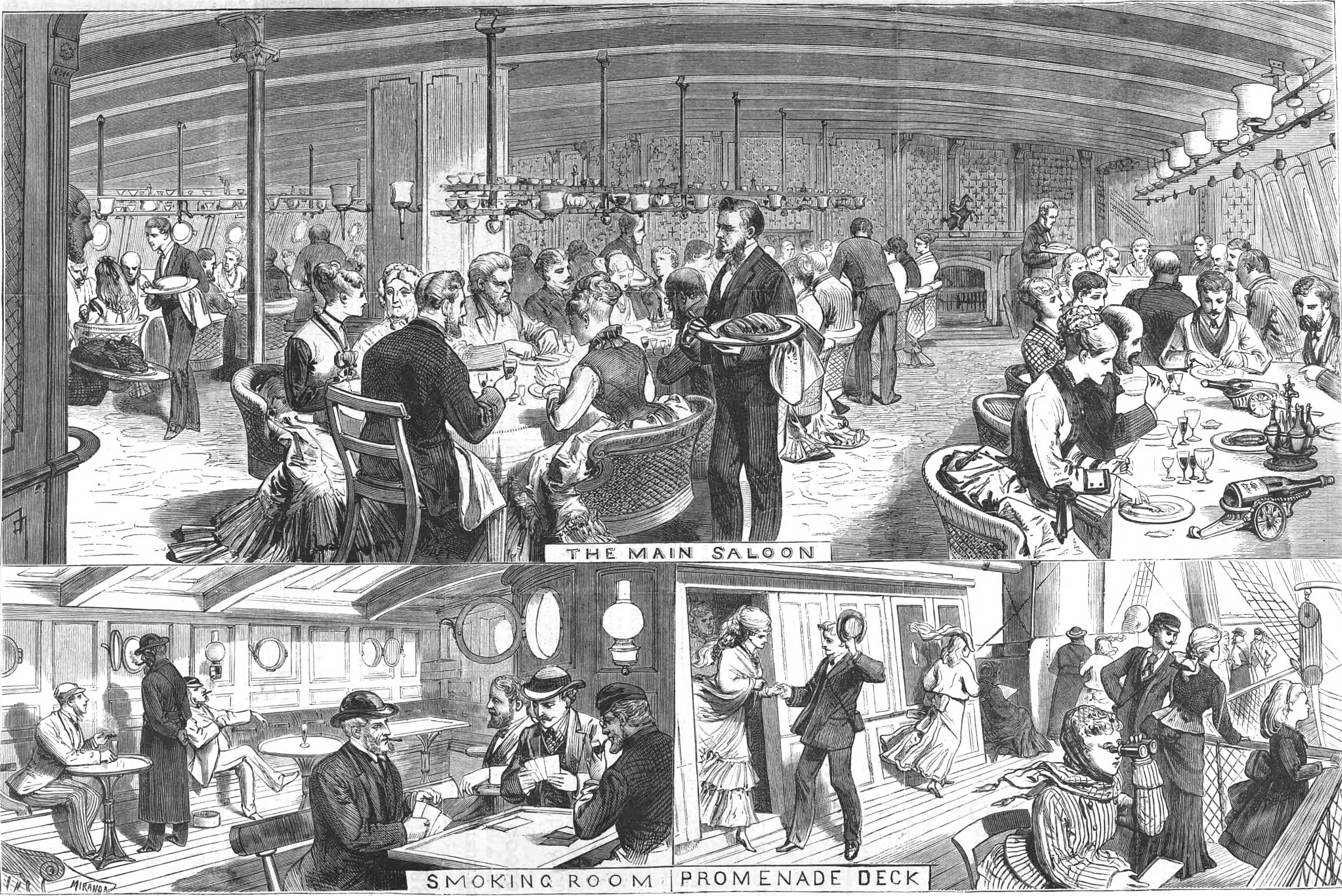
Illustrations of the interiors of the Oceanic-class ships

Designed by Edward Harland, the class featured a number of innovations in ocean liner design. Amongst these, was the moving of the first class passenger accommodation amidships, as this was located further away from the noise and vibration of the propeller, as well as being less affected by the extreme motion of the ship in rough weather. On previous ships, the passenger accommodation had been located aft below the poop deck; a leftover from sailing ship days. Another innovation was in the length to breadth ratio, which was 10/1 in place of the usual 8/1.

The ships were designed to carry 166 crew, plus 166 saloon, or first class passengers, and 1,000 steerage, or third class passengers. The saloon passenger accommodation was luxuriously furnished, and was described as being 'more like an imperial yacht' than a passenger liner, and included features such as running water with bathtubs provided for passengers. Each saloon class cabin was equipped with larger than normal portholes, to let in more light. Electric bells were provided in each saloon cabin, in order to allow the occupants to summon stewards. The dining saloon, which was also amidships, provided individual seats rather than older style bench seating. The steerage accommodation, although lacking in the comfort of the first class, was of higher quality than was common for ships of the period.

Another innovation was the use of lightweight railings around the edges of the decks, replacing the old and heavy bulwarks. The ships also featured a single deck structure, which itself supported a deck, a change from the isolated deckhouses of earlier ships. The ships had three decks, and were divided into watertight compartments by seven bulkheads.

The ships were powered by four-cylinder compound reciprocating steam engines, which could propel the ships via a single propeller to a speed of 14 knots (26 km/h; 16 mph), these were supplied with steam by twelve double ended boilers, which consumed around 70 tons of coal per-day. As Harland & Wolff had not yet gained any expertise in building engines, they were built by either Maudslay, Sons & Field of Lambeth, or George Forrester and Company of Liverpool. As was common for steamships of the era, the class were equipped with auxiliary sails, and were rigged as four masted barques.

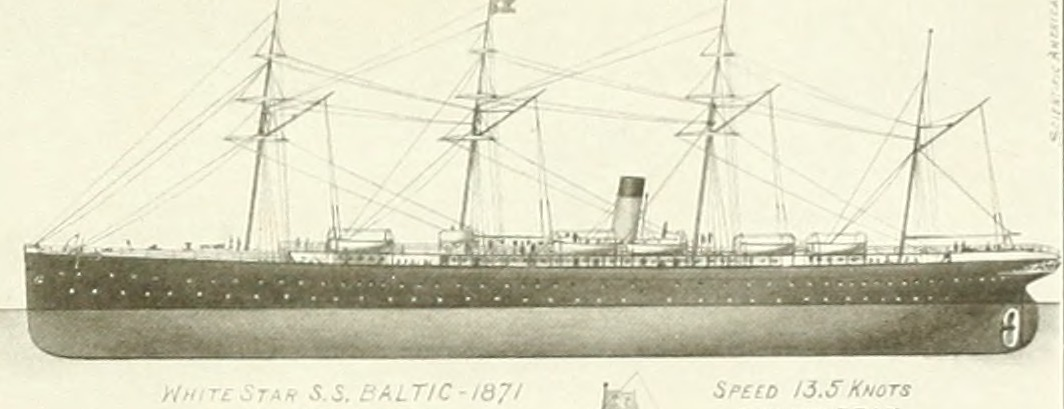
Postcard showing the side profile of Baltic

== Careers ==
=== Oceanic ===
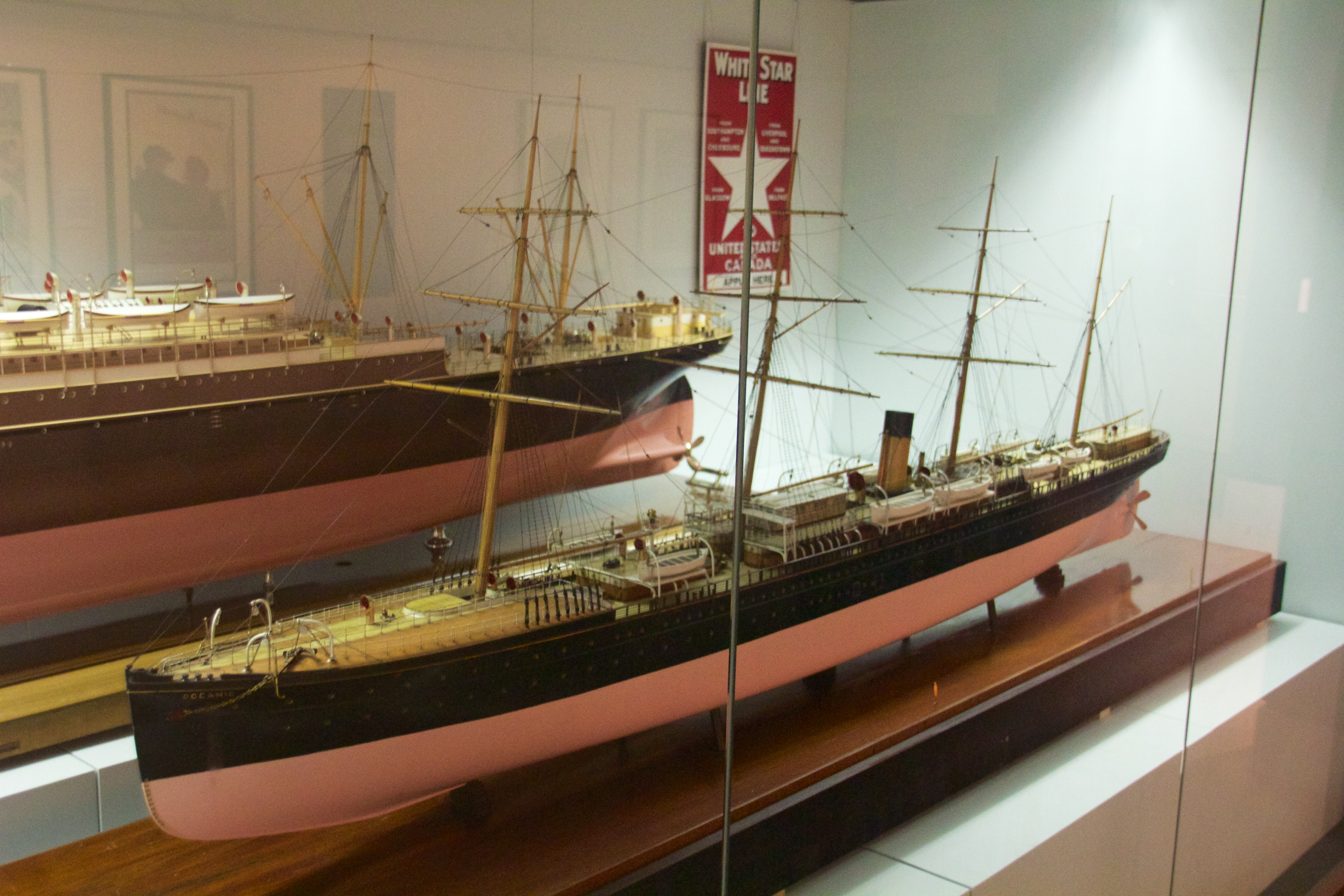
Builder's model of Oceanic at the Merseyside Maritime Museum, the following three ships were built to the same design

Oceanic was launched in August 1870, built at a cost of £120,000 (equivalent to £12,350,000 in 2025) it was the first White Star ship to use a name ending with ic, beginning a naming tradition which would last for the rest of the company's existence. Oceanic made her maiden voyage in March 1871, which failed to attract much custom, carrying only 64 passengers, whilst 300 people sailed on the more established Cunard Line's Calabria, although business picked up on subsequent voyages thereafter. In 1872, she was refitted with a forecastle deck, to act as a breakwater. Although Oceanic was the class pioneer, her service with the White Star Line was fairly short lived, as, when Germanic came into service in 1875, Oceanic became surplus to the company's needs on the North Atlantic, and instead, she was chartered to the Occidental and Oriental Steamship Company (O&O) to operate on the Pacific Ocean between San Francisco, Yokohama, and Hong Kong, a route which she served successfully for the next twenty years, except for one incidence in 1888 when she collided with, and sank City of Chester. In 1895, she was sent back to Harland & Wolff with the intention of fitting a new engine in order to prolong her service life, instead it was found to be uneconomical to do this work due to the ship's age, and she was sold for scrap and broken up the following year.

=== Atlantic ===
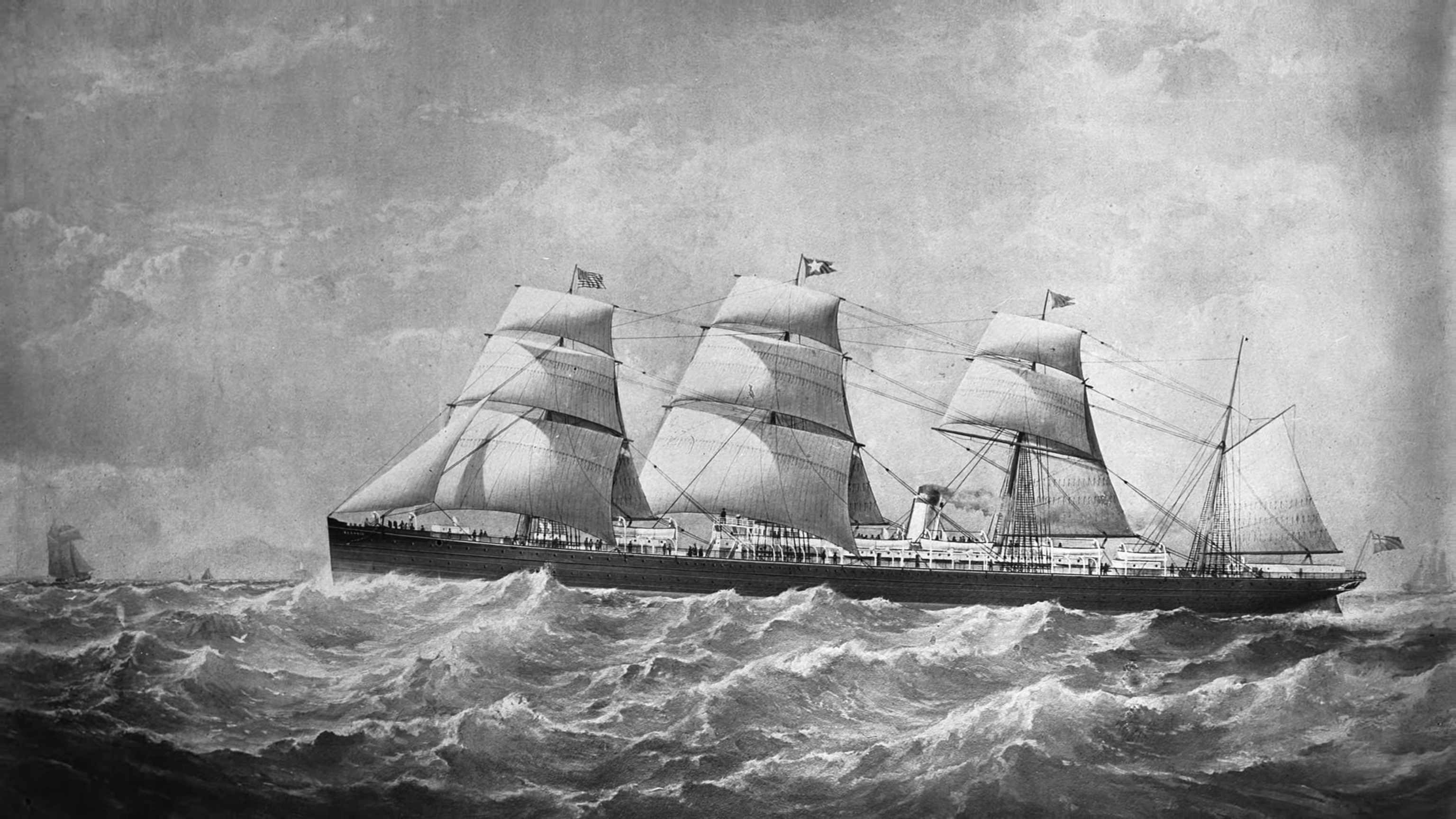
Atlantic

Atlantic was nearly identical to her older sister ship Oceanic in most respects, except that her engines were built by G. Forrester & Co of Liverpool as opposed to Maudslay, Sons & Field of Lambeth. Atlantic was launched in November 1870, and commenced her maiden voyage in June 1871. She successfully completed eighteen voyages, however her nineteenth voyage commencing in March 1873 would end in tragedy: On a westbound crossing, Atlantic battled against heavy seas and strong winds the whole way, the slow progress of the journey, led to concerns that the ship would not have enough coal remaining to make it to New York, leading the captain to decide instead to divert to Halifax, Nova Scotia in order to refuel the ship. Few of the crew had any experience of the approach to Halifax harbour, and unbeknown to them, the ship was miles off course, and en route to the harbour, the ship struck an underwater rock. Atlantic rapidly foundered, leading to the deaths of at least 585 of the 952 persons on board. This would be the largest tragedy to occur on a White Star Line ship until the sinking of Titanic 39 years later in 1912.

=== Baltic ===
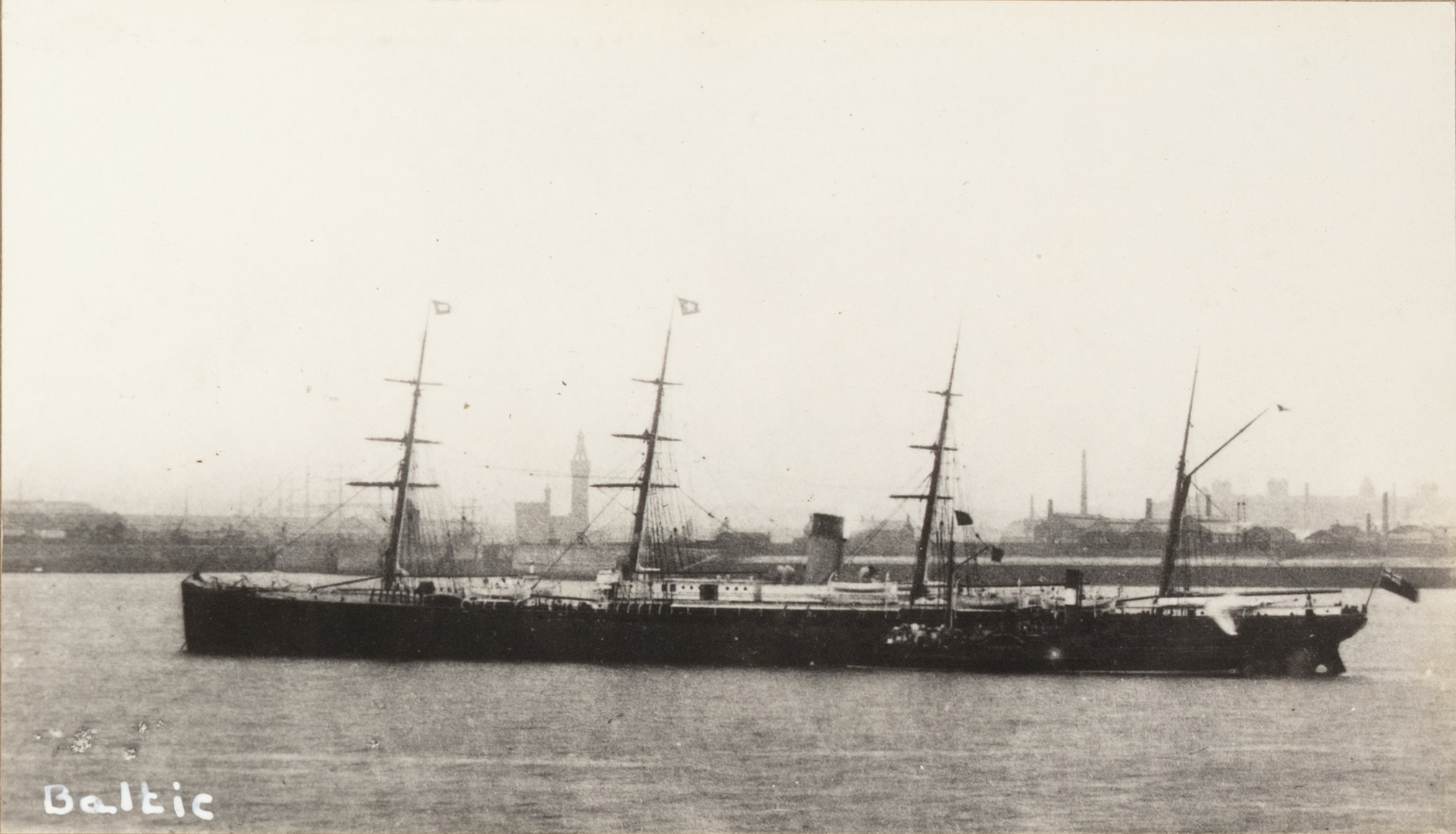
Baltic

The third ship in the class was launched in March 1871 with the name Pacific, however, the press raised memories of an earlier ship by that name which had disappeared in the Atlantic in 1856. This led to the decision to rename the ship Baltic prior to her completion. Baltic was an improved version of Oceanic, in that her engines, built by Maudslay, Sons & Field were of an improved design, and she had improved passenger accommodation. She made her maiden voyage on the Liverpool-Queenstown-New York route in September 1871, and in January 1873, she captured the much sought after westbound Blue Riband achieving a timing of 7 days, 20 hours, 9 minutes, from New York to Queenstown. Baltic served White Star on the North Atlantic run for 17 years, except for two brief periods in 1883 and 1885 when she was chartered to the Inman Line. In 1888 she was sold to the Holland America Line and renamed Veendam, in 1890 she had new engines fitted, and in February 1898, she struck a submerged derelict wreck and sank without any loss of life.

=== Republic ===
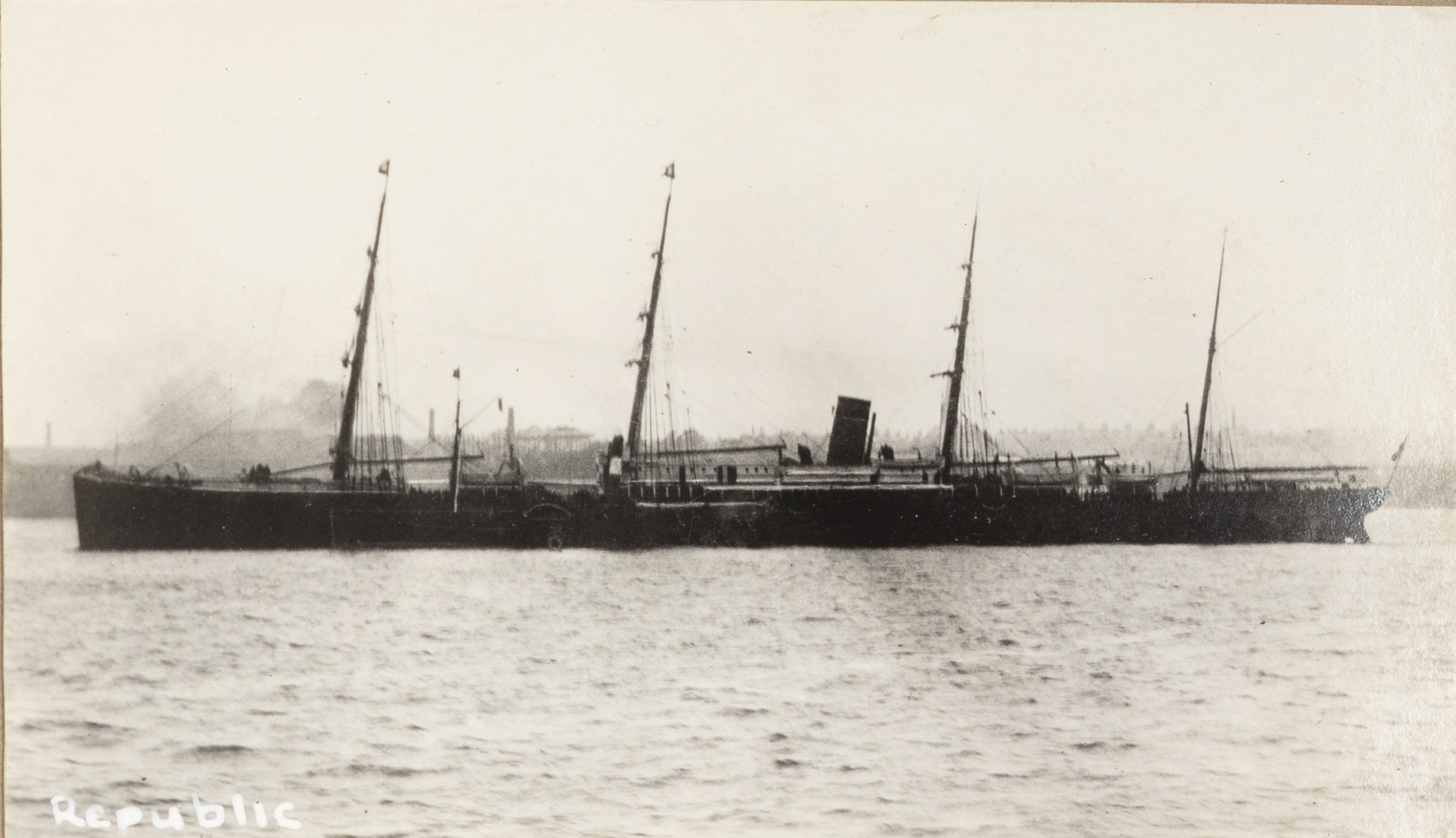
Republic

Republic was launched on 4 July 1871, which is the United States Independence Day, which accounts for the name. She was the last of the initial quartet of ships, and her engines were built by G. Forrester & Co. She made her maiden voyage in February 1872, from Liverpool to New York, which was marked by extremely rough seas, causing extensive, but minor damage to the ship. From October 1872, she was used experimentally on a service to South America, however by the following year it became clear that this service was not commercially viable and it was abandoned. When the larger liners Britannic and Germanic came into service in 1875, Republic became White Star's reserve vessel, used whenever another ship was undergoing repairs or maintenance. In 1889 she was sold to the Holland America Line and renamed Maasdam, and as placed on the Rotterdam-New York route. In 1902 she was sold to the Italian company La Veloce and renamed Vittoria, before quickly being switching to Città di Napoli. In 1908 she was used by the Italian government as an accommodation ship for victims of the 1908 Messina earthquake in Sicily, and in 1910 she was broken up for scrap, after a total career of 38 years, making her the longest lived member of the class.

=== Adriatic ===
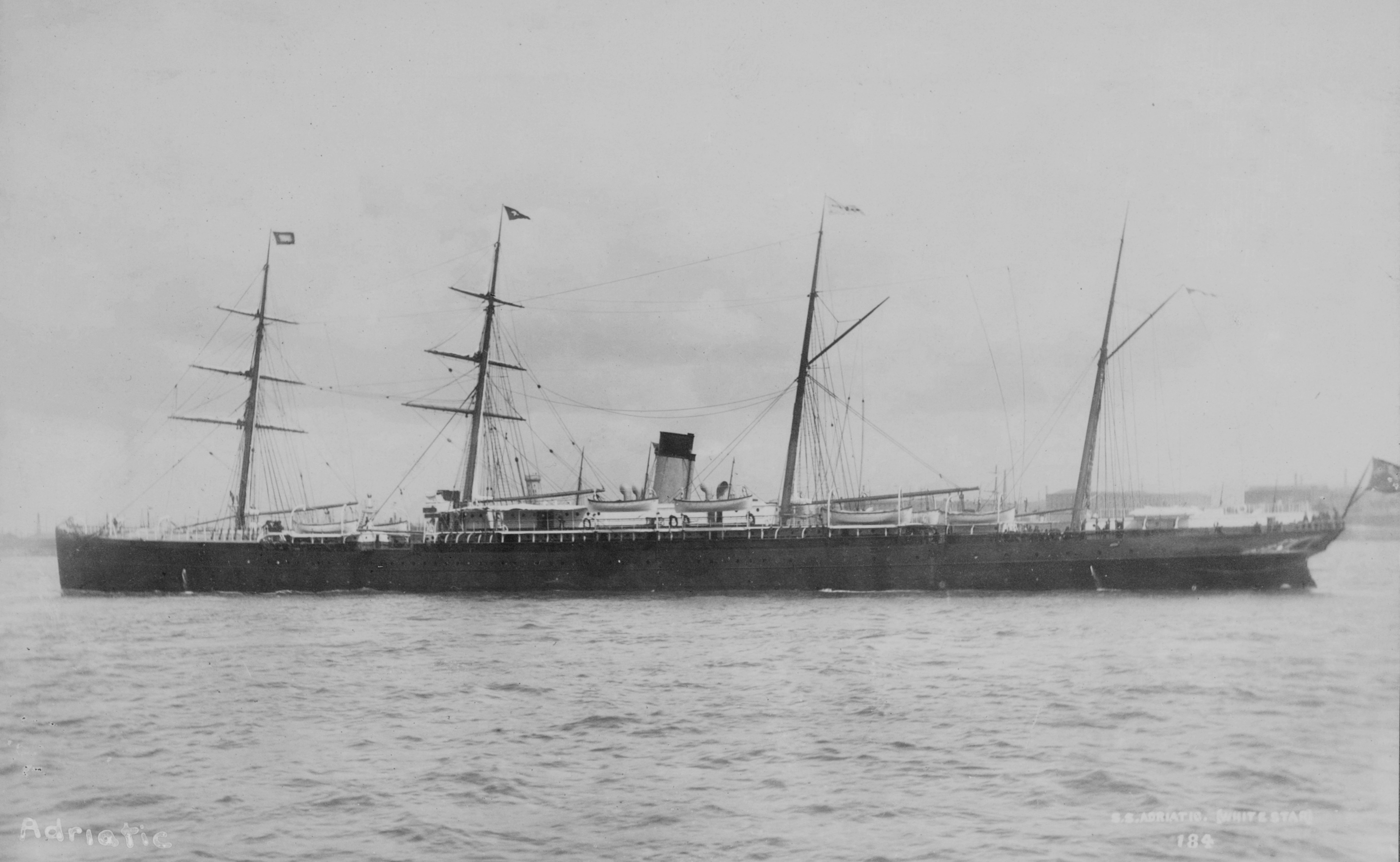
Adriatic

Adriatic was launched in October 1871 and was a different design than the previous four ships, being slightly larger, and with more powerful engines. In April 1872, she made her maiden voyage to New York. She was fitted with an experimental gas lighting system in place of the usual oil lamps. However, this proved unsuccessful due to gas leaks caused by the motion of the ship, and the ship reverted to oil lamps. In October 1874, she collided with Cunard Line's Parthia when leaving New York, causing substantial damage. Adriatic had a somewhat accident prone career and was involved in two further collisions with smaller ships in 1875 and 1878 respectively. both of which sank the smaller vessels, and the latter involved loss of life. In 1884, Adriatic was refitted and second-class accommodation was added. She made her final voyage in 1897 and was scrapped two years later.

=== Celtic ===
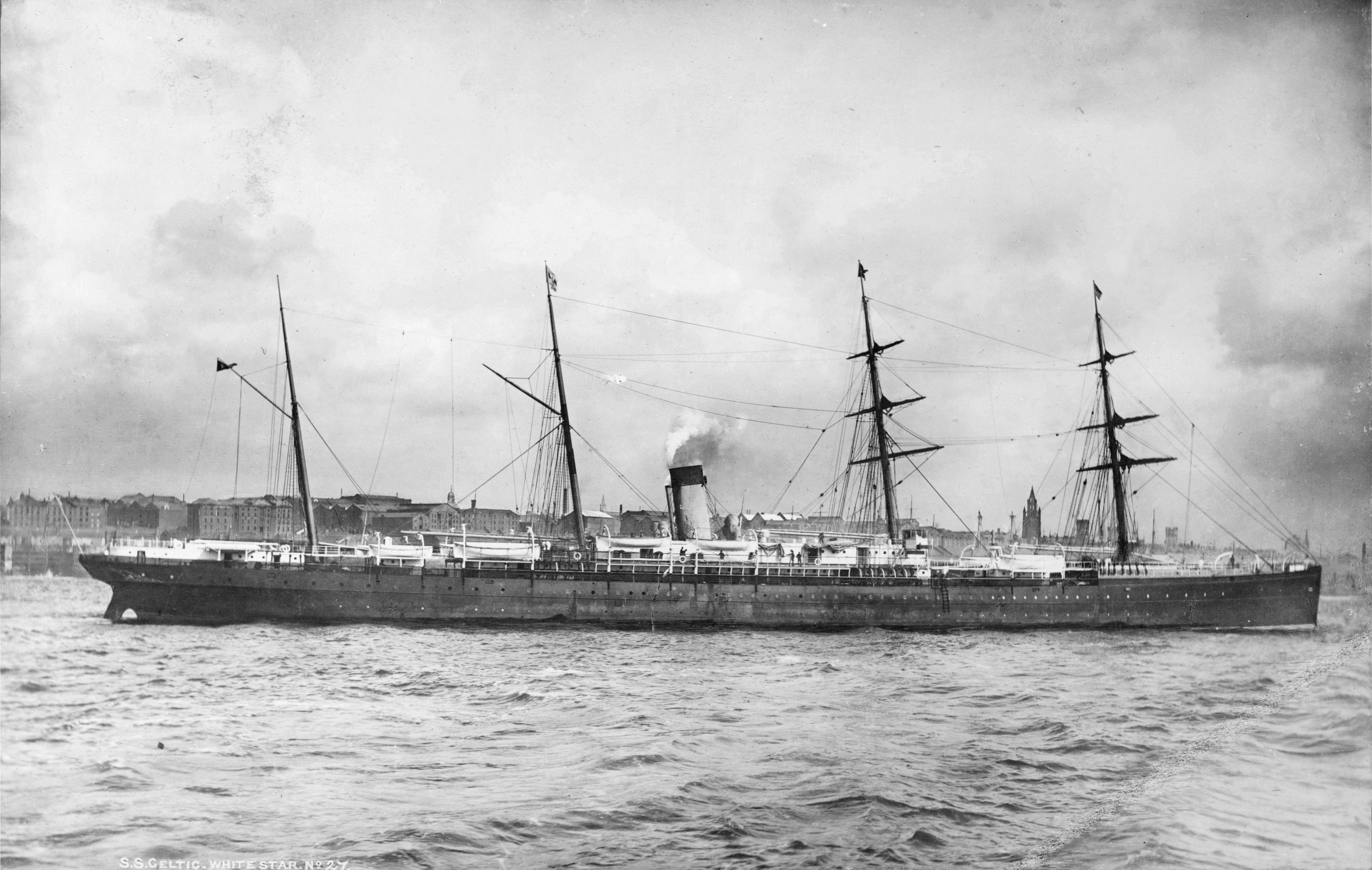
Celtic

The sixth and final ship of the group was originally to be called Arctic, however there had been another ship of that name which had sunk in 1854, and so the decision was taken to rename the vessel Celtic whilst she was still being built. The ship was launched in June 1871. Celtic was the same design as Adriatic except for her engines being made by G. Forrester & Co. Her maiden voyage was in October 1871. She served with reasonable success on the North Atlantic route, until May 1887, when she was involved in a serious coilision with the fellow White Star liner Britannic, when she collided at right angle with the larger ship in fog, nearly sinking Britannic and badly damaging Celtic. She was repaired and returned to service until 1891, when she was retired and put up for sale. In 1893, she was sold to the Danish Thingvalla Line and renamed Amerika and put on the Copenhagen to New York route. However, it was found that the ship was too large for the passenger loadings on that route, and the service was not a commercial success and only eight sailings were made. In 1898, she was sold for scrap.

== See also ==
- RMS Oceanic, later White Star ship named after its earlier namesake.
  - Oceanic (ship), for other ships of the same name.
