= SS Adriatic (1871) =

Transatlantic liner

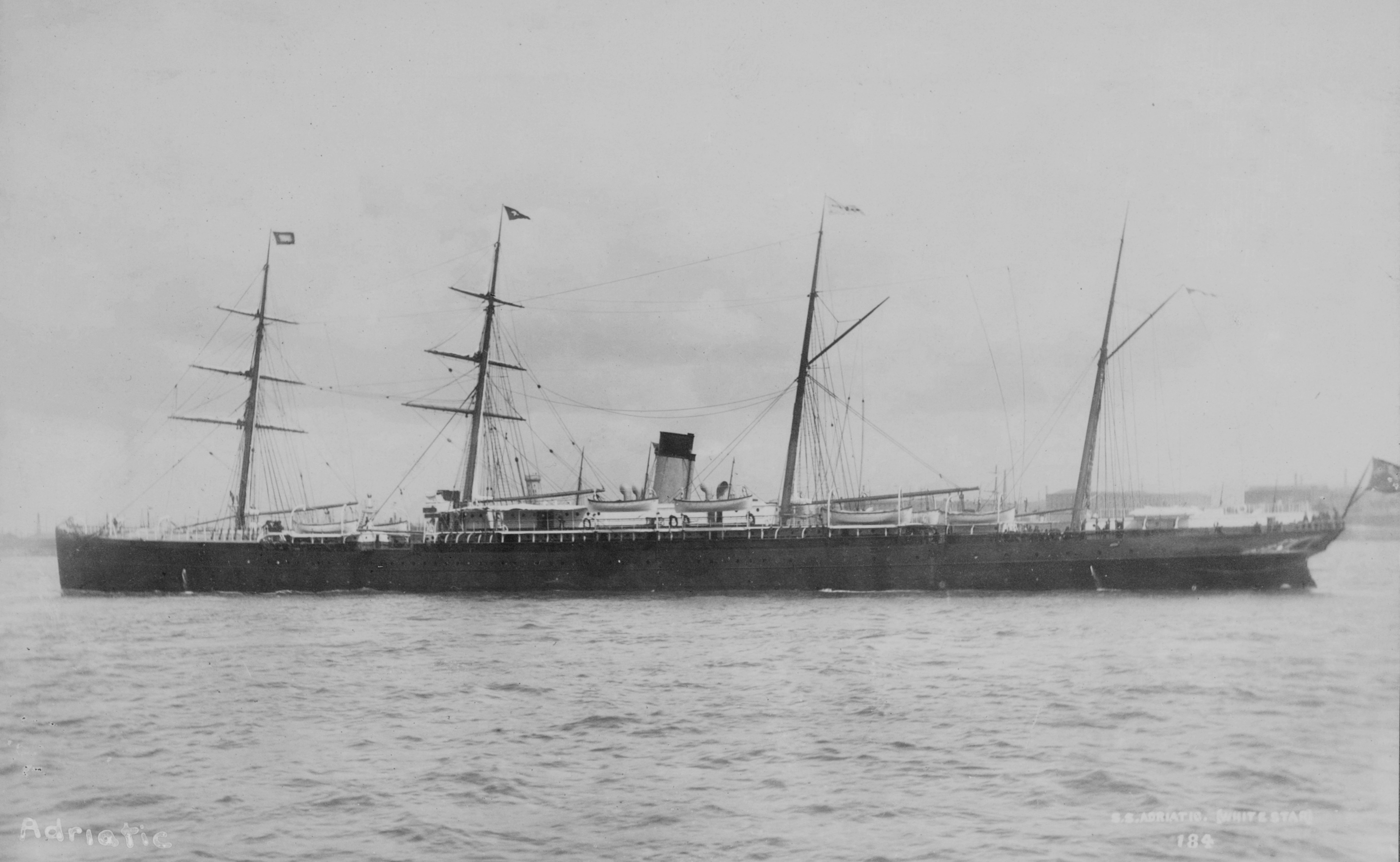
- SS Adriatic in the Mersey

History
- Name: SS Adriatic
- Namesake: Adriatic Sea
- Owner: White Star Line
- Port of registry: United Kingdom
- Builder: Harland & Wolff, Belfast
- Yard number: 77
- Laid down: 1871
- Launched: 17 October 1871
- Completed: 31 March 1872
- Maiden voyage: Liverpool–New York, 11 April 1872
- Refit: 1884
- Home port: Liverpool
- Fate: Sold for scrap, 1899

General characteristics
- Class & type: Oceanic-class ocean liner
- Tonnage: 3,888 GRT; 2,458 NRT
- Length: 452 ft (138 m); 437.2 ft (133.3 m)
- Beam: 40.9 ft (12.5 m)
- Depth: 31.0 ft (9.4 m)
- Decks: 2
- Propulsion: 2 × 2-cylinder compound engines; 12 boilers, single screw; 600hp
- Speed: 14.5 knots (26.9 km/h; 16.7 mph)
- Capacity: 850 passengers

SS Adriatic was the first of two White Star Line ocean liners to carry the name Adriatic. The White Star Line's first four steamships of the Oceanic-class, the (Oceanic (I), Atlantic, Baltic, and the Republic) met with great success in the trans-Atlantic market, and the line decided to build two more. The first of these was the SS Adriatic, which was built by Harland & Wolff and launched on 17 October 1871; the second was the SS Celtic.

== History ==
During the remainder of 1871 and the early part of 1872, Adriatic was fitted out. As a part of this process, a technology new to that era was tried on the ship. Up to this point, ships' cabins had been lit by oil lamps, but the builders decided to try new gas lamps on Adriatic and her sister, Celtic. A machine was added to the engine room to produce gas from oil. This worked well, initially, but the motion of the ship caused gas leaks to develop at the joints in the pipework and the system had to be removed.

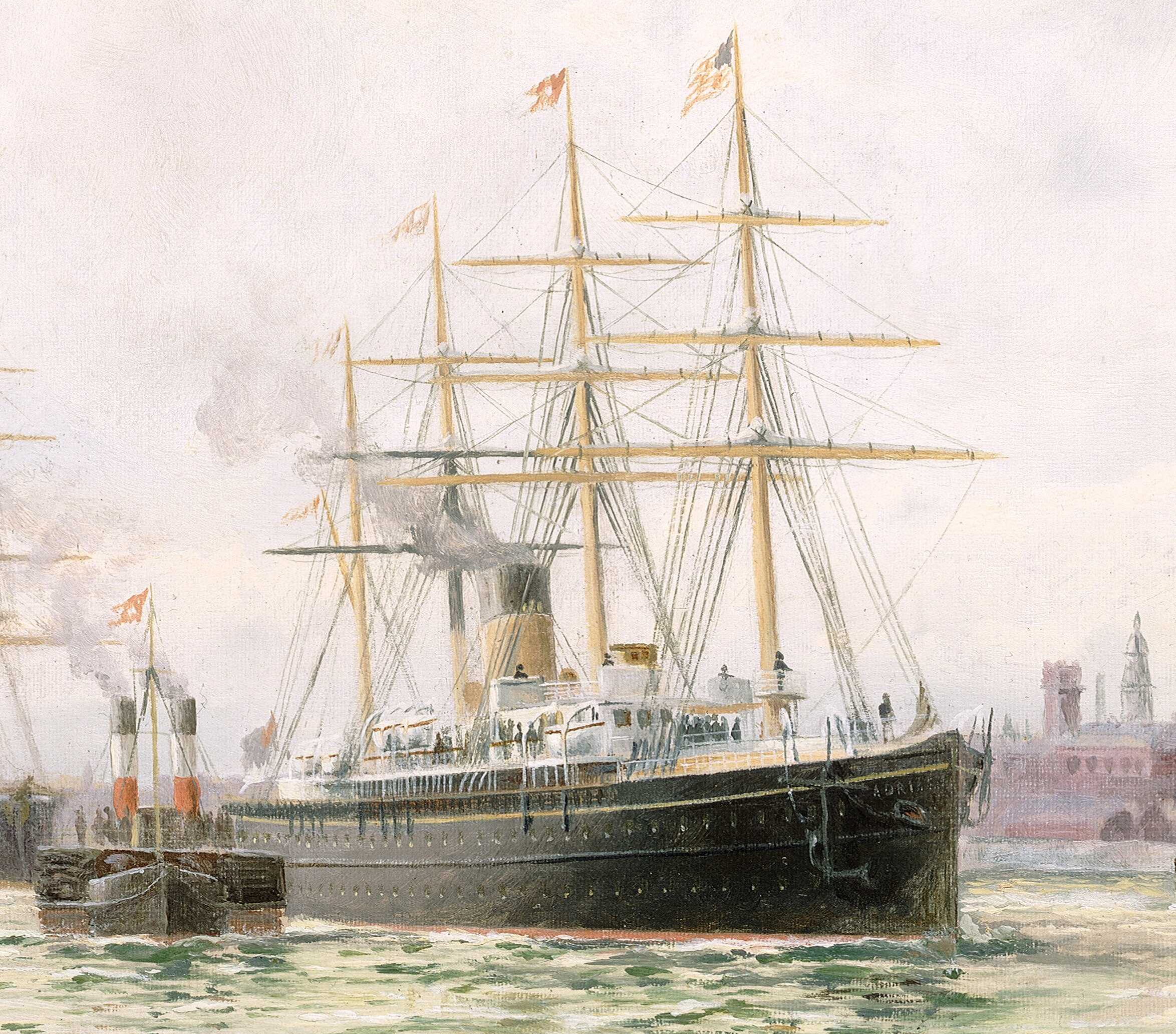
Painting of Adriatic

Adriatic left on her maiden voyage on 11 April 1872, sailing from Liverpool to New York, under Captain Sir Digby Murray, who had captained the maiden voyage of the White Star's first ship, Oceanic the year before. Adriatic was similar in configuration to the earlier Oceanic-class ships, with a single funnel and four masts, with the highest towering to 150 ft (46 m), and the first three square-rigged. Her hull was painted black in typical White Star fashion, and accommodated two classes, First and Steerage. As the largest of the six White Star Line ships, Adriatic received the designation as the Line's flagship, a title she held until the larger Britannic came on line in 1874.

A month later, during a subsequent Atlantic crossing to New York, Adriatic maintained an average speed of 14.52 knots and won the Blue Riband away from the Cunard Line's Scotia, which she had held since 1863. On 4 January 1873, Adriatic rescued the crew of the Norwegian barque Carmen, which had become waterlogged in the Atlantic Ocean whilst on a voyage from Saint George, New Brunswick, Canada to Liverpool. Adriatic was involved in several accidents. The first occurred in October 1874, when she collided with the Cunard Line's Parthia while sailing parallel. There was little damage to either ship. On 8 March 1875, Adriatic rammed the British schooner Columbus in the Crosby Channel at Liverpool; Columbus was sunk and her captain's child was drowned, but the other seven people on board were rescued by the steamship Enterprise. Adriatic was held solely to blame for the collision. A claim that Columbus was not showing any lights was dismissed and Adriatic had failed to go to the assistance of Columbus.

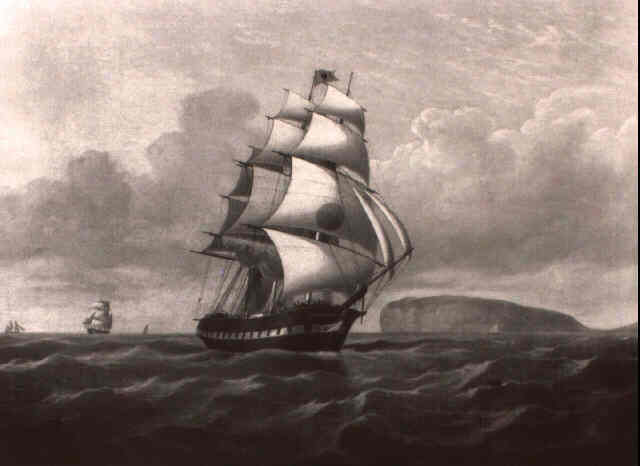
Harvest Queen, sunk in a collision with Adriatic.

In December of the same year, in St. Georges Channel, Adriatic ran down and sank the sailing vessel Harvest Queen in an accident that resulted in the loss of all life aboard Harvest Queen. Harvest Queen sank so quickly that the crew of Adriatic could not identify what ship they had hit, and only a records search later showed who the victim had been. On 19 July 1878, Adriatic collided with Hengist 18 nautical miles (33 km) off Holyhead in dense fog. Later that day, she collided with and sank the brig G. A. Pike off of South Wales, killing five crew on board Pike. Blame was fixed on Adriatic for excessive speed.

In 1884, Adriatic underwent a refit, during which accommodations for 50 second class passengers were added.

On 4 October 1889 the Adriatic crashed into the New York piers while docking. Her starboard anchor crashed 50 ft (15.45m) through the new dock house with the well-wishers running away for cover.

In 1897, she was deemed too old for regular trans-Atlantic service, and was laid up as a reserve ship for the Line, at Birkenhead. When RMS Oceanic entered service in 1899, Adriatic was sold for scrap, arriving in Preston on 12 February.

== See also ==
- RMS Adriatic (1906) – later namesake ship of the White Star Line.

Records
| Preceded by Scotia | Holder of the Blue Riband (Westbound); 1872–1875 | Succeeded by Germanic |
