= SS Oceanic (1870) =

British passenger liner, launched 1870

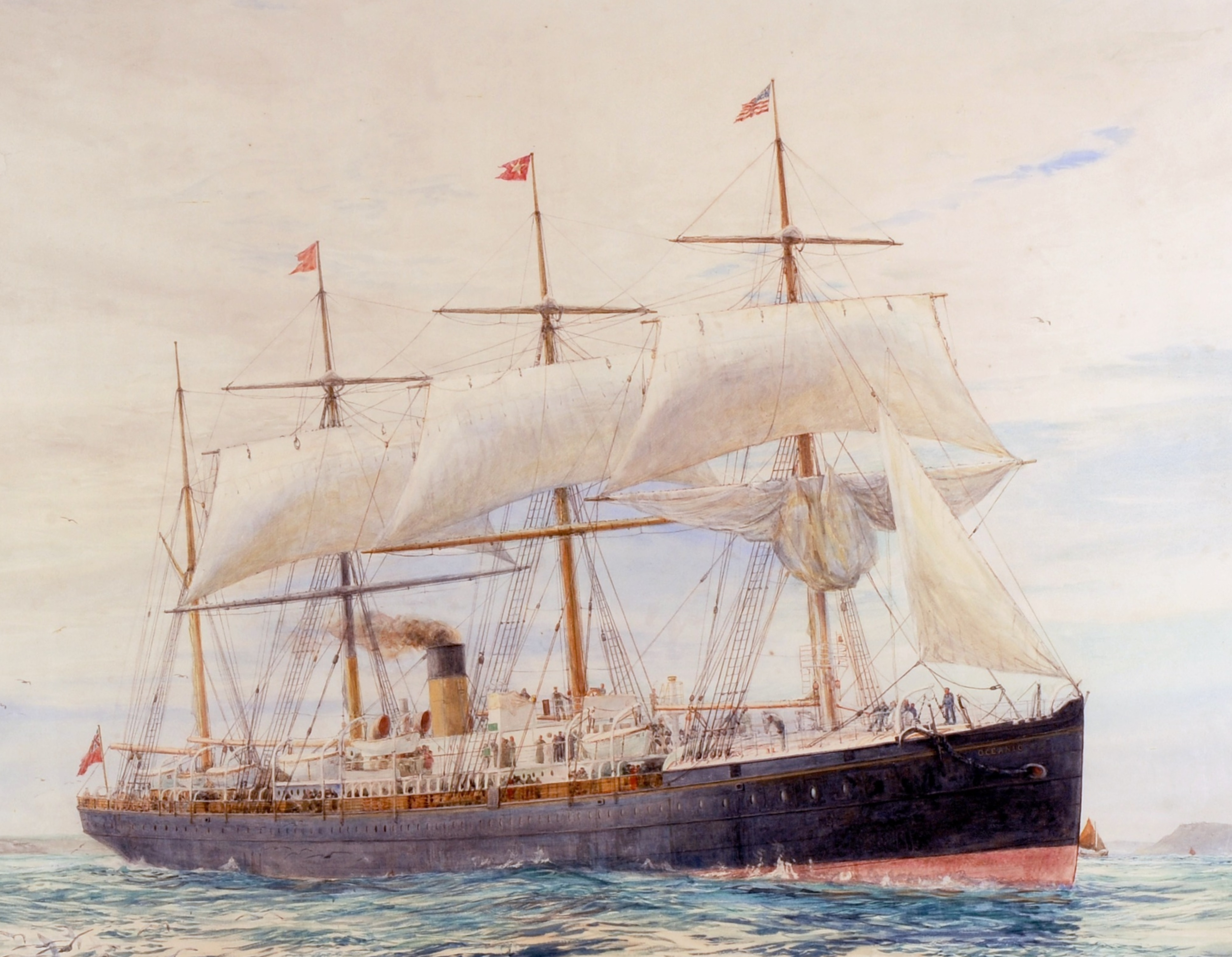
- The Oceanic off Queenstown on her second homeward voyage from New York, 12 June 1871, by William Lionel Wyllie, 1895

History

United Kingdom
- Name: Oceanic
- Owner: White Star Line
- Operator: White Star Line (1871–1875); Occidental and Oriental Steamship Company (1875–1895)
- Route: Liverpool to New York (1871–1875); San Francisco, Yokohama and Hong Kong (1875–1895)
- Ordered: 30 July 1869
- Builder: Harland and Wolff, Belfast
- Yard number: 73
- Launched: 27 August 1870
- Completed: 24 February 1871
- Maiden voyage: 2 March 1871
- Out of service: 17 May 1895
- Fate: Sold for scrap, 1895; Broken up on the River Thames, 10 February 1896

General characteristics
- Class & type: Oceanic-class ocean liner
- Type: Ocean liner
- Tonnage: 3,707 GRT
- Displacement: 7,940 tons (loaded)
- Length: 420 ft 4 in (128.12 m)
- Beam: 40 ft 10 in (12.45 m)
- Depth: 31 ft 5 in (9.58 m)
- Installed power: Four-cylinder compound steam reciprocating engine, comprising two high-pressure and two low-pressure cylinders, generating 1,990 ihp (1,480 kW)
- Propulsion: Propeller, sails
- Sail plan: Barque
- Speed: 14.5 knots (26.9 km/h; 16.7 mph) (service speed)
- Capacity: 166 first class and 1,000 third class passengers
- Crew: 143

SS Oceanic was the White Star Line's first liner and first member of the Oceanic class; she was an important turning point in passenger liner design. Entering service in 1871 for Atlantic crossings, she was later chartered to Occidental and Oriental Steamship Company (O&O) in 1875. The ship provided passenger service for O&O in the Pacific until 1895 when she was sold for scrap.

== Design and construction ==
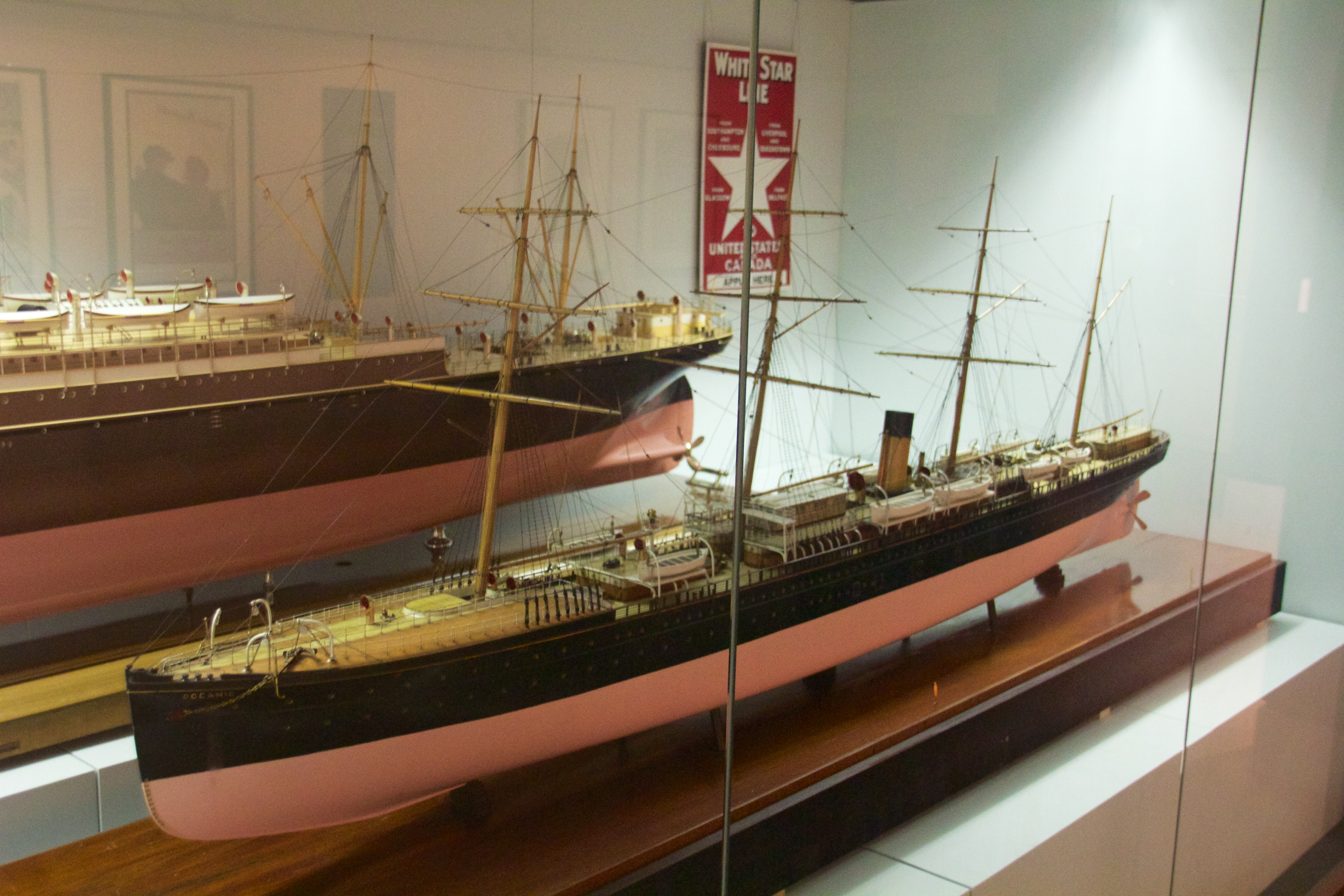
Builders' model, at the Merseyside Maritime Museum, showing the ship as altered in 1872.

Oceanic was built by Harland and Wolff in Belfast, and was launched on 27 August 1870, arriving in Liverpool for her maiden voyage on 26 February 1871. Powered by a combination of steam and sail, she had twelve boilers generating steam at 65 pounds-force per square inch (450 kPa) powering a single four cylinder compound steam engine, 2 x 78 in (2.0 m) and 2 x 41 in (1.0 m), with a stroke of 60 in (1.5 m). A single funnel exhausted smoke. Four masts carried sail; square sails on the first three masts, and fore-and-aft sails on the mizzenmast, for a four-masted barque rig. The hull was constructed of iron and divided into eleven watertight compartments. A crew of 143 operated the vessel.

The Oceanic had a capacity of approximately 1,000 third-class and 166 first-class passengers, known at the time as 'steerage' and 'saloon' class. The White Star Line was among only a handful of trans-Atlantic passenger lines to segregate their third-class accommodations; single men were berthed in the bow while berthing for single women and families was in the stern. First-class cabins were positioned amidship, away from ocean movements and the vibration of the engines.

The contemporary press described her "more an imperial yacht than a passenger liner".. Innovative features included running water and electric bells to summon stewards in the first-class cabins. Portholes in the ship were much larger than on contemporary liners, providing more light. The saloon dining room was large enough to seat all first-class passengers at once.

Oceanic was built at a cost of £120,000 (equivalent to £14,830,000 in 2024) She was the first White Star ship to use a name ending with ic, beginning a naming tradition which would last for the rest of the company's existence. She was to be the first ship of the Oceanic-class; a series of six sister ships constructed in rapid succession: Atlantic, Baltic, Republic, Adriatic and Celtic. All were of the same approximate dimensions with differences in tonnage, with the exception of the Adriatic and the Celtic, the designs for which were later modified to slightly increase their sizes.

== Service history ==
Oceanic left for her maiden voyage from Liverpool on 2 March 1871. This was the White Star Line's inaugural service on the North Atlantic run against established competitors, and it initially failed to generate much custom, as Oceanic carried only 64 passengers, whilst 300 sailed on the parallel departure of the Cunard Line's Calabria. Not long after departing, she had to return because of overheated bearings. Her voyage restarted on 16 March. When she reached New York, she was visited by 50,000 people. From that point onward, business picked up and Oceanic was a success for the White Star Line.

In January 1872, Oceanic underwent a refit, during which a large forecastle was added to help prevent the bow being inundated during high seas. Two new boilers were added to increase steam pressure and thus engine power, and the four masts were shortened.

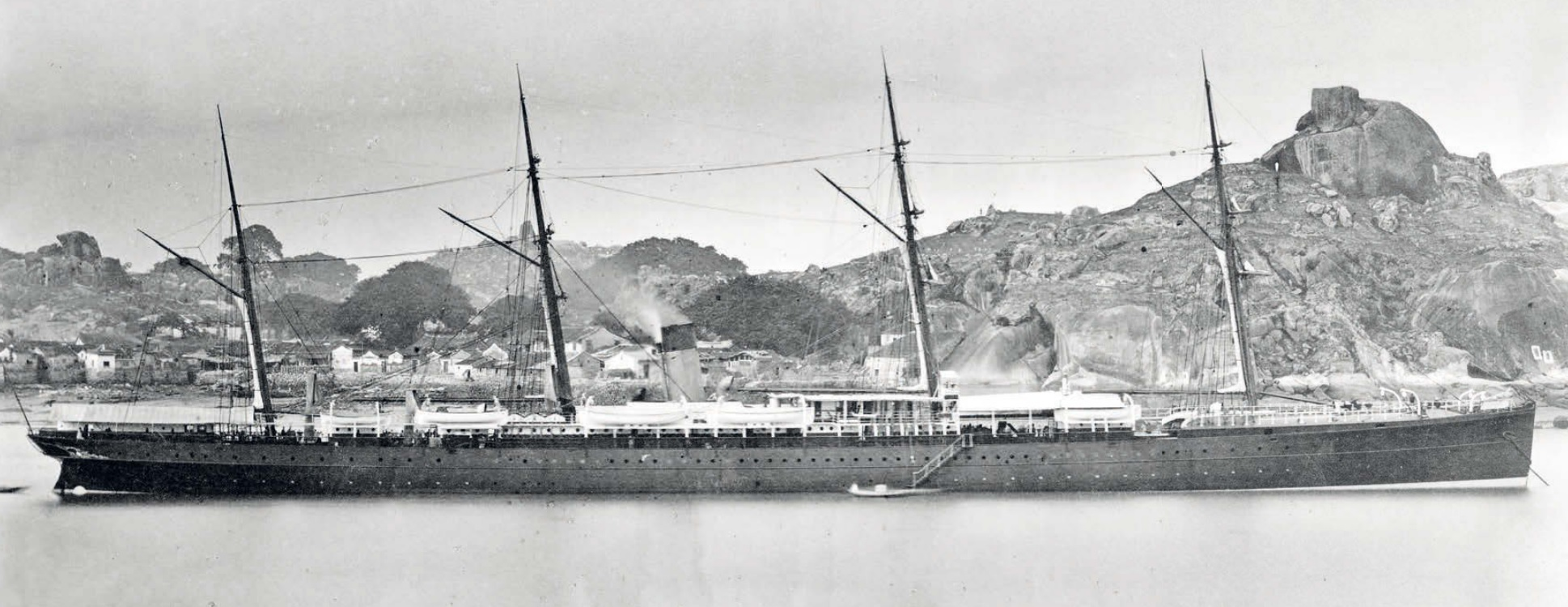
Oceanic at Amoy in 1879

Oceanic continued sailing with the White Star Line on the Liverpool to New York City route until 11 March 1875, when she became surplus to the company's needs on the North Atlantic when the larger Britannic entered service. Instead, Oceanic was chartered to the Occidental and Oriental Steamship Company (O&O) for service on the Pacific Ocean between San Francisco, Yokohama and Hong Kong. The White Star Line provided the officers, while the crew was Chinese. The ship itself remained in White Star Line colours, but flew the O&O flag. During the repositioning voyage from Liverpool to Hong Kong, Oceanic set a speed record for that route. Later, she also set a speed record for Yokohama to San Francisco in December 1876, of 14 days, 15 hours, and then broke her own record over that route in November 1889, with a time of 13 days, 14 hours and 5 minutes.

During 1879-80 she returned to Liverpool for another major refit, which included new boilers.

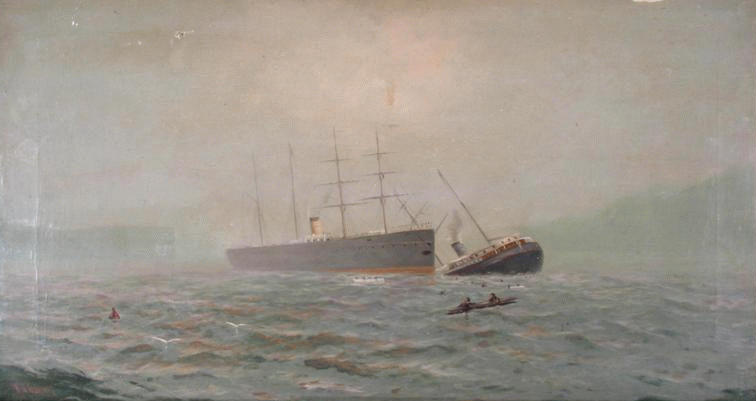
A painting of Oceanic (left) standing by the sinking City of Chester

On 22 August 1888, Oceanic collided with the coastal liner SS City of Chester just outside the Golden Gate; the latter ship sank, killing 16 on board.

On 7 January 1890, Nellie Bly boarded Oceanic in Yokohama to cross the Pacific as part of her voyage Around the World in Seventy-Two Days. She arrived in San Francisco on 21 January 1890, which was a day behind schedule as a result of rough weather.

In 1895, Oceanic was returned to the White Star Line, which planned to modernise the ship, and put her back into service. She was sent back to Harland and Wolff for new engines to be installed, but when the ship was inspected closely, it was found not to be cost-effective to carry out the work. Instead, she was sold for scrap for £8,000, and left Belfast for the last time on 10 February 1896, under tow, for a scrapyard on the River Thames.

== See also ==
- RMS Oceanic (1899) – later namesake ship of the White Star Line
- Oceanic (unfinished ship) – proposed White Star Liner of the 1920s which was never built
