= SS Vittoria =

Two steamships of La Veloce Navigazione Italiana a Vapore were named Vittoria:

- SS Vittoria (1871), in service 1902–10
- SS Vittoria (1873), in service 1887–99
