= Oceanic (ship) =

Several ships have been named Oceanic. They include:

- SS Oceanic (1870), the White Star Line's first ocean liner
  - Oceanic-class ocean liner, class of liners based on SS Oceanic (1870)
- RMS Oceanic, a transatlantic ocean liner built for the White Star Line
- Oceanic (unfinished ship), a project of the 1930s
- SS Oceanic (1950), built as SS Independence in 1950
- SS Oceanic (1965), also named Big Red Boat I by Premier Cruises
