= Harvest Queen =

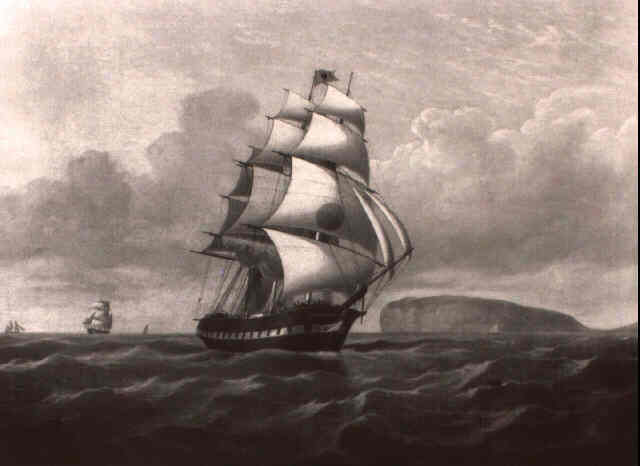
- Harvest Queen

History

United States
- Name: Harvest Queen
- Owner: C.H. Marshall & Co., New York
- Builder: William H. Webb, New York, NY
- Launched: May 1854
- Fate: Sank in the Irish Channel on 31 December 1875, after a collision with the steamer Adriatic

General characteristics
- Class & type: Packet ship
- Tons burthen: 1383 tons
- Sail plan: Barque
- Notes: Yard No. 86

Harvest Queen was a packet ship of the Black Ball Line built in 1854, by William H. Webb, which sank in a collision with the steamer Adriatic at 3 a.m. on 31 December 1875.

== Voyages ==
The artist Charles Henry Miller, a recent graduate of New York Homeopathic Medical College, sailed on the Harvest Queen as ship's surgeon in 1864, under Captain Hutchinson, between New York and Liverpool.

This vessel, though never renowned for fast voyages, as were so many of her sister clippers, was a noted emigrant ship ... In 1864, when our artist made his first and last voyage in her, common sailors were getting ninety dollars for the trip, and bounty jumping was frequently practised. Many desperadoes, attracted by the high rate of wages, shipped as foremast hands, and stirring scenes were enacted. A mutiny, which was luckily quelled without loss of life, broke out twice on the Harvest Queen; and Mr. Miller, among his other reminiscences of an eventful voyage, recalls a day when he was ranged beside the captain on the quarter-deck, revolver in hand, ready to aid in overcoming the mutineers ... When the ship reached New York on her return trip, two of the sailors were drowned in an attempt to escape from her; and the sketches made by Mr. Miller on board include one of a luckless and forlorn-looking seaman, standing at the wheel, who had jumped overboard, but was captured and severely beaten.

While the Harvest Queen was lying in the Liverpool docks, Miller took a flying trip to London, Scotland, and France, making numerous sketches. When he reached home again, his love of art, freshly kindled by the sight of some of the great art galleries of Europe, and the wonderful ocean scenes which he had attempted to draw on the voyage, proved itself too strong to be overcome. He abandoned medicine, and returned to the practice of art in New York.

== Collision and sinking ==
"The American ship Harvest Queen ... while beating up the English Channel, having nearly completed her voyage from San Francisco, and, we may suppose, with most of her crew in the forecastle singing, yarning, and getting their "shore togs" ready for the morrow, was cut down by the steamship Adriatic. She sank almost immediately. Not a soul was saved. A terrible shriek floated across the sea and then all was still. Boats were lowered from the Adriatic, which cruised about all night, but in vain; when daylight spread over the Channel not a spar nor a vestige of the unfortunate ship marked her grave."

Harvest Queen sank so quickly that the crew of Adriatic could not identify what ship they had hit, and only a records search later showed who the victim had been.

"Before a Court of Admiralty held in New York on the White Star Liner's arrival, testimony was adduced throwing the blame on the Harvest Queen because her lights were not visible."
