= Charles Henry Miller =

American painter

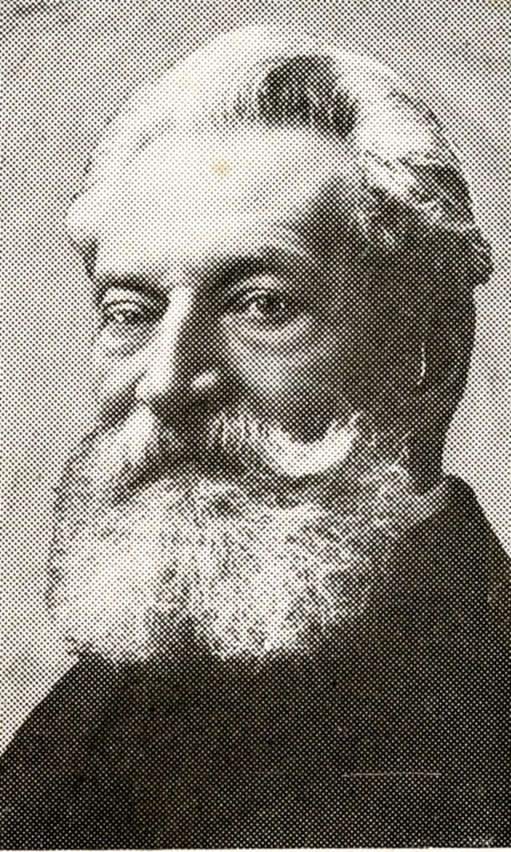
- Charles Henry Miller, N.A.
- Born: March 20, 1842; Long Island, New York
- Died: January 21, 1922 (aged 79); Queens, New York
- Education: Bavarian Royal Academy
- Known for: Painting

Charles Henry Miller, N.A. (March 20, 1842 – January 21, 1922) was an artist and painter of landscapes from Long Island, New York. The American poet Bayard Taylor (1825–1878) called him, "The artistic discoverer of the little continent of Long Island."

== Biography ==
Miller was educated at Mount Washington Collegiate Institute and graduated in medicine at the New York Homeopathic Medical College in 1863 or 1864, receiving his diploma from the hand of William Cullen Bryant, then President of that institution. He then offered his services to our Government; but his homoeopathic faith proving a barrier, and meeting Captain Hutchinson of the once famous "Black Ball" line of packets, he accepted from him the position of surgeon on his ship, the Harvest Queen, sailing from New York to Liverpool. This vessel, though never renowned for fast voyages, as were so many of her sister clippers, was a noted emigrant ship ... In 1864, when our artist made his first and last voyage in her, common sailors were getting ninety dollars for the trip, and bounty jumping was frequently practised. Many desperadoes, attracted by the high rate of wages, shipped as foremast hands, and stirring scenes were enacted. A mutiny, which was luckily quelled without loss of life, broke out twice on the Harvest Queen; and Mr. Miller, among his other reminiscences of an eventful voyage, recalls a day when he was ranged beside the captain on the quarter-deck, revolver in hand, ready to aid in overcoming the mutineers ... When the ship reached New York on her return trip, two of the sailors were drowned in an attempt to escape from her; and the sketches made by Mr. Miller on board include one of a luckless and forlorn-looking seaman, standing at the wheel, who had jumped overboard, but was captured and severely beaten.

While the Harvest Queen was lying in the Liverpool docks, Miller took a flying trip to London, Scotland, and France, making numerous sketches. When he reached home again, his love of art, freshly kindled by the sight of some of the great art galleries of Europe, and the wonderful ocean scenes which he had attempted to draw on the voyage, proved itself too strong to be overcome. He abandoned medicine and returned to the practice of art in New York.

Before his graduation, Miller had occasionally painted pictures. In 1860, at the age of eighteen, he had exhibited The Challenge Accepted at the National Academy of Design, in New York City.

Miller lived in Queens at the summer estate, Queenslawn, originally purchased by his parents, Jacob (1803–1874) and Jane Taylor Miller (1806–1895). He went abroad again in 1867, spending three years as a pupil in the Bavarian Royal Academy at Munich under the instruction of Adolf Lier.

=== Career ===
After the death of his father in 1874, who was a wealthy architect and builder, Miller received a large inheritance that allowed him to paint as an independent artist for the remainder of his long life. He worked seriously and exhibited regularly, including at international exhibitions.

The majority of his oil paintings depict Long Island subjects, especially those in and around Queens Village. Fed up with the development of the eastern part of Queens (present-day Nassau County), he began to spend part of his summers in East Marion, Long Island, c. 1910. Here he spent his time sketching and painting the surrounding areas.

In 1885 he published The Philosophy of Art in America, using the pseudonym Carl De Muldor (he was descended from the De Muldor family).

He served as president of the New York Art Club in 1879 and of the American Committee at the Munich International Exposition in 1883.

Charles Henry Miller died at his home in Queens on January 21, 1922.

== Legacy and honors ==
- In 1910 Miller founded the Queens Borough Allied Arts & Crafts Society.
- A New York City public school, Queens P.S. 33, was once named for him.
- 1878, gold medal awarded by the Massachusetts Charitable Association
- 1885, gold medal at the World's Exposition in New Orleans.

== Exhibition history ==
The following list includes many his known exhibitions, though there are likely more:

- National Academy of Design, New York, NY, 1860–61, 1865–67, 1870–1921
- Brooklyn Art Association, Brooklyn, NY, 1872–84, 1891–92
- Artist's Fund Society, New York, NY, 1874 (exhibition & sale), 1886 (exhibition & sale)
- Century Association, New York, NY, (1874–1917)
- Philadelphia Centennial Exhibition, Philadelphia, PA, 1876 (prize)
- Society of American Artists, New York, NY, (1878–1882)
- Massachusetts Charitable Mechanic Association, Boston, MA, 1878 (prize)
- Paris International Exposition, Paris, France, 1878, 1889
- American Water Color Society Exhibition, New York, NY, 1879
- Pennsylvania Academy of Fine Arts, Philadelphia, PA, 1879–99
- Boston Art Club, Boston, MA, 1880-1907 (prize)
- Union League Club, New York, NY, 1880
- Lotos Club, New York, NY, 1880, 1896, 1899–1900, 1906
- Salons of Paris, Paris, France, 1882
- International Exhibition, Munich, Germany, 1883 (president & exhibitor)
- New Orleans Exposition, New Orleans, LA, 1885 (prize)
- Art Institute of Chicago, Chicago, IL, 1888–89, 1891, 1894–98, 1904
- Fifth Avenue Art Gallery, New York, NY, 1889 (exhibition & sale)
- World's Columbian Exposition, Chicago, IL, 1892
- Frederick A. Chapman Gallery, New York, NY, 1898 (solo)
- Miller Studio Exhibition, New York, NY, 1901
- Brooklyn Museum Opening Exhibition, Brooklyn, NY, 1902
- Silo Galleries, New York, NY, 1902 (Jane Miller estate, exhibition & sale)
- Corcoran Gallery of Art, Washington, DC, 1908
- American Red Cross Exhibition at the American Art Galleries, New York, NY, 1922 (exhibition & sale)
- DaFalco Art Gallery, New York, NY, c. 1922 (exhibition & sale).

== Holding institutions ==
- Brigham Young University Art Museum, Salt Lake City, UT
- Brooklyn Institute Museum, Brooklyn, NY
- Brooklyn Museum of Art, Brooklyn, NY
- Democratic Club, New York, NY
- Heckscher Museum of Art, Huntington, NY
- Long Island Museum, Stony Brook, NY
- Metropolitan Museum of Art, New York, NY
- Museum of the City of New York, New York, NY
- Nassau County Historical Society, Garden City, NY
- Nassau County Museum of Art, Glen Cove, NY
- National Academy of Design, New York, NY
- Parrish Art Museum, Southampton, NY
- Republican Club, New York, NY
- Rhode Island School of Design, Providence, RI.
