= SS City of Chester =

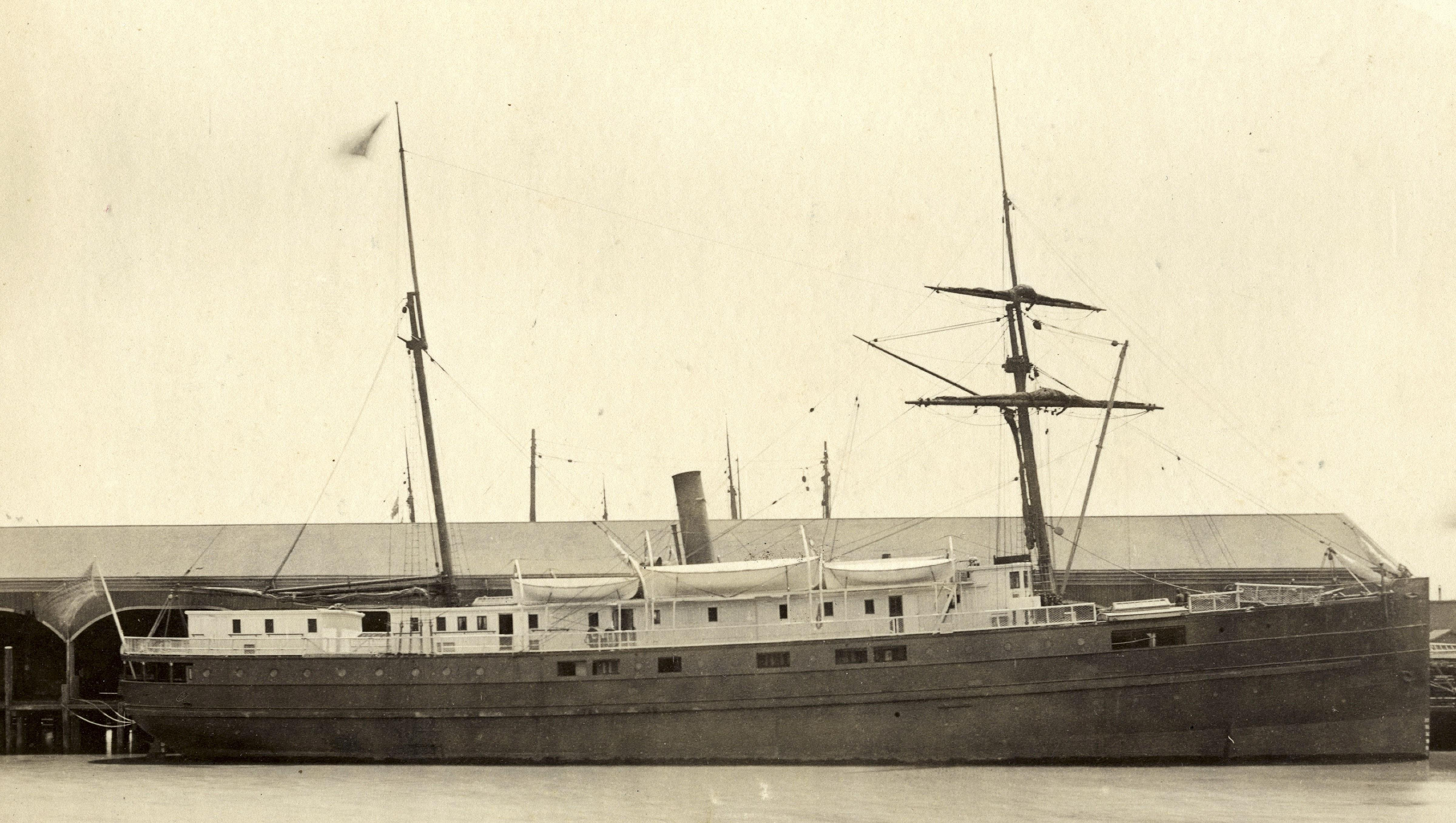
- center

History

United States
- Name: SS City of Chester
- Owner: Oregon Railroad Co.
- Operator: Pacific Coast Steamship Company
- Port of registry: Portland, Oregon
- Builder: John Roach & Sons, Chester, Pennsylvania
- Launched: 11 February 1873
- Completed: April 1873
- In service: 1875
- Identification: U.S. Official Number: 125473; Signal: JRNK
- Fate: Sunk in collision 22 August 1888
- Notes: Sometimes confused with 1872 City of Chester also built Chester, Pa., O/N 125002, 153.78 GRT, 107 feet (33 m) length registered at New York, N.Y.

General characteristics
- Tonnage: 1,106.21 GRT, 785.33 NRT
- Length: 202 feet (62 m)
- Beam: 33.2 ft (10.1 m)
- Depth: 15.9 feet (4.8 m)
- Installed power: 2 X 11 ft 6 in (3.5 m) long boilers, 1 X 9 ft 6 in (2.9 m), 1 X 12 ft 6 in (3.8 m) diameter
- Propulsion: 2 cyl compound steam engine; 24 in (61.0 cm) & 44 ft (13.4 m), 45 ft (13.7 m) stroke
- Speed: 11 nmi (13 mi; 20 km)
- Capacity: Passengers: 114 first class, 200 steerage

The SS City of Chester was a steamship built in 1875 that sank after a collision in a dense fog with SS Oceanic at the Golden Gate in San Francisco Bay on August 22, 1888. She was owned by the Oregon Railroad Co. and leased by the Pacific Coast Steamship Company.

City of Chester had been purchased in October 1876 and brought from New York around South America to Portland, Oregon in March 1877 and used in coastal trade. At the time of the collision the ship was in service from San Francisco to Eureka and other locations in the vicinity. City of Chester was outbound with Oceanic inbound from Hong Kong. Though the ships sighted each other findings indicated the smaller vessel was caught in a tidal current, cut almost in two by the liner and sank in about six minutes with loss of sixteen passengers and three crew.

The wreck was relocated in May 2013 by National Oceanic and Atmospheric Administration (NOAA) Office of Coast Survey Navigational Response Team 6 with multi-beam sonar.

== Construction ==
City of Chester was built in 1875 by John Roach & Sons in Chester, Pennsylvania. The ship was 1,106.21 GRT, 785.33 NRT, 202 feet (62 m) long, 33.2 feet (10.1 m) beam, 15.9 feet (4.8 m) depth of hold, with two boilers, a compound steam engine rated at 600 indicated horsepower. The ship was registered at Portland, Oregon with U.S. Official Number 125473, signal JRNK.

== History ==
City of Chester, purchased in October 1876 by the Oregon Steamship Company to replace the steamer John L. Stephnes, left New York December 29, 1876 for San Francisco. The ship was the first to use the newly opened East River channel through Hell Gate then passing around South America through the Strait of Magellan. After voyage repairs at San Francisco the ship departed for Portland, Oregon on March 24, 1877. The Oregon Steamship Company merged with the Oregon Steam Navigation Company in 1879 forming the Oregon Railway and Navigation Company. The ship was used in coast-wise trade.

At the time of the collision the ship was chartered to the Pacific Coast Steamship Company. The normal route at that time was departure from San Francisco's Broadway Wharf on Wednesdays for the California cities of Eureka, Arcata and Fields Landing on Humboldt Bay returning from Eureka on Saturdays.

== Sinking ==
Heading to Eureka, California, with 90 passengers on the foggy morning of August 22, 1888, at about 10 am she collided with Oceanic, a liner inbound from Hong Kong. The two ships saw each other, but as was later determined by a British Naval Court, City of Chester was caught by tidal current and carried into the path of the larger ship. An eyewitness aboard Oceanic said: "Into her we crashed with irrisistible force, cutting her just as though she was a cheese." She sank in six minutes, and despite rescue efforts by those aboard Oceanic, sixteen passengers, including two children, and three crew members died. In terms of loss of life, this is the second most deadly wreck in the history of San Francisco Bay, after the sinking of the SS City of Rio de Janeiro in 1901.

Oceanic had Chinese crew and her steerage passengers were Chinese immigrants; anti-Chinese xenophobia was high in the US at the time and initially the Chinese were accused of letting City of Chester's passengers drown. When news of their efforts to save them came out, it helped to reduce the prejudice against the Chinese.

== Discovery of wreck ==
The wreck is located in 216 feet (66 m) of water just inside the Golden Gate Bridge at 37°48′50″N 122°28′00″W and was found in May 2013 by National Oceanic and Atmospheric Administration Office of Coast Survey Navigational Response Team 6 using multi-beam sonar. It is only 400 feet (120 m) from where it was located by the United States Coast and Geodetic Survey, one of the ancestor agencies of NOAA, in September 1888 in a hydrographic survey using a wire dragged from the tug Raymond.

An exhibit on City of Chester is to be created at the Gulf of the Farallones National Marine Sanctuary office at Crissy Field. The office occupies the building erected as a United States Life-Saving Service station in response to the disaster.

== Gallery ==
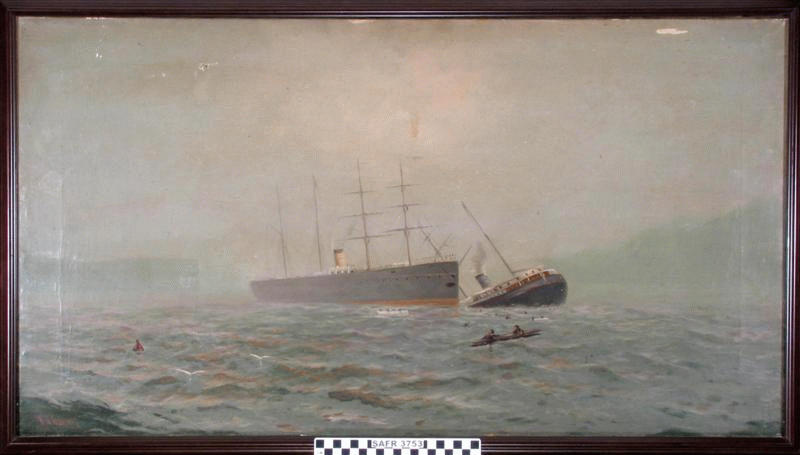
Oil painting by Robert Gilbert of the collision of Oceanic and City of Chester near Fort Point in 1888

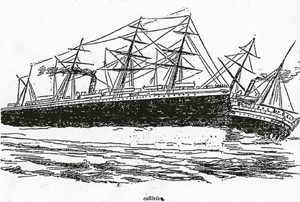
Illustration of the collision from the San Francisco Chronicle
