= SS Celtic (1872) =

Ocean liner

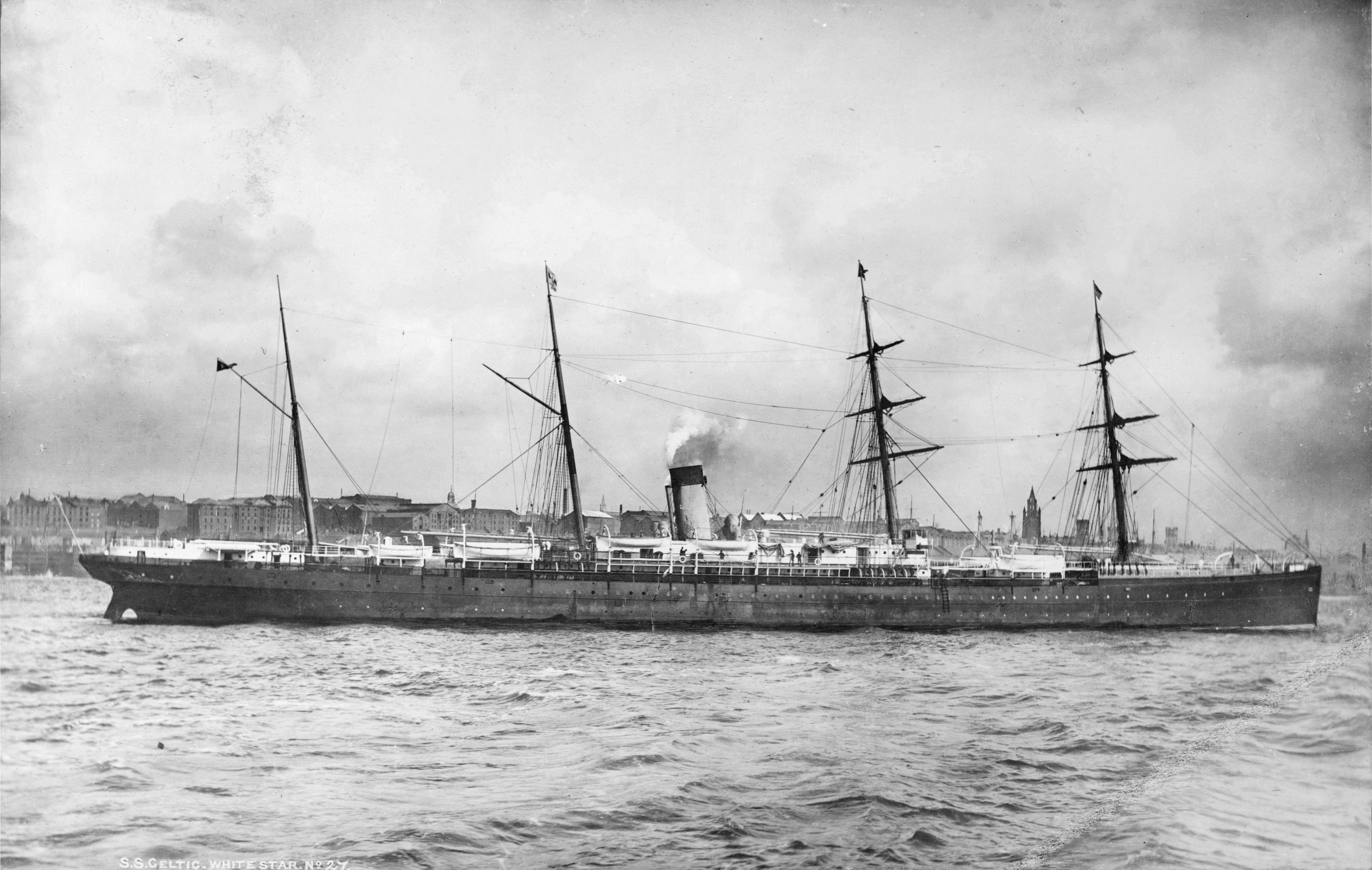
- Celtic in the River Mersey

History

United Kingdom
- Name: SS Celtic
- Namesake: Celtic Sea
- Owner: White Star Line
- Route: Liverpool - Queenstown (Cobh) - New York City
- Builder: Harland and Wolff, Belfast; Engines by George Forrester and Company, Liverpool
- Yard number: 79
- Laid down: as Arctic
- Launched: 18 June 1872
- Completed: 17 October 1872
- Maiden voyage: 24 October 1872
- Fate: Sold to the Thingvalla Line of Copenhagen on 6 April 1893

Denmark
- Name: SS Amerika
- Owner: Thingvalla Line of Copenhagen
- Route: Copenhagen - Christiania (Oslo) - Christiansand - New York City
- Acquired: 6 April 1893
- In service: 27 May 1893
- Out of service: September 1897
- Fate: Scrapped at Brest in 1898

General characteristics
- Class & type: Oceanic-class ocean liner
- Tonnage: 3,867 gross register tons
- Length: 437.2 ft (133.3 m)
- Beam: 40.9 ft (12.5 m)
- Installed power: Steam
- Propulsion: Single screw
- Sail plan: Four masts (rigged for sail)
- Speed: 14 kn (26 km/h; 16 mph)
- Capacity: 166 1st- and 1,000 3rd-class passengers
- Notes: Iron construction, single funnel

SS Celtic was an ocean liner built for the White Star Line by shipbuilders Harland and Wolff of Belfast.

The Celtic, the first of two White Star ships to bear the name, was the last of six Oceanic-class liners commissioned by White Star; she and her older sister Adriatic were ordered following the success of what was originally a series of four.

== Naming ==
The new ship was originally proposed to be named Arctic, but as the American Collins Line had a Paddle steamer with that name which sank in 1854, the White Star managers changed their minds, and settled on the name Celtic.

== Career ==
=== Early career ===
Celtic was one of six liners built for White Star to allow the line to operate a mail service across the Atlantic. (As the ships had a five-week turnaround, five ships were needed to allow a weekly service, with the sixth ship acting as a spare). Celtic was a duplicate of Adriatic and like Adriatic, was larger than the first four ships. Celtic was 437 ft 2 in (133.25 m) long, with a beam of 40 ft 9 in (12.42 m). Twelve single-ended boilers fed steam at 70 psi (480 kPa) to a four-cylinder tandem steam engine, rated at 600 NHP. The ship had a Gross register tonnage of 3867 tons and a Net register tonnage of 2439 tons.

Celtic was built by Harland and Wolff at their Belfast shipyard, and was launched on 8 June 1872.

Celtic left Liverpool on her maiden voyage in October 1872. On 18 January 1873, Celtic struck floating wreckage in the Atlantic Ocean and lost her propeller blades. She was towed in to Queenstown, County Cork on 20 January by Gaelic. On 24 January 1877, Celtic rescued the survivors from the American schooner Island Belle, which resulted in Celtic's Commanding Officer, Benjamin Gleadell being thanked by the President of the United States, Ulysses S. Grant. In early 1879, Celtic's propeller became detached from the driveshaft while at sea, and the ship made its way to Queenstown (now Cobh) in Ireland by sail.

In 1880, Edward Smith, who later became the Line's most celebrated Captain, and the Captain of the RMS Titanic, joined the crew of Celtic as her Fourth Officer.

In November 1881, Celtic again rescued a shipwrecked crew, this time of the Brigantine Alice.

=== Britannic collision ===
On 19 May 1887, at about 5:25 in the afternoon, the Celtic (commanded by Captain Peter John Irving) collided with the White Star liner Britannic in thick fog about 350 miles (560 km) east of Sandy Hook, New Jersey. The Celtic, with 870 passengers, had been steaming westbound for New York City, while the Britannic, carrying 450 passengers, was on the second day of her eastward journey to Liverpool. The two ships collided at almost right angles, with the Celtic burying her prow 10 feet (3 m) in the aft port side of Britannic. The Celtic rebounded and hit two more times, before sliding past behind Britannic.

Six steerage passengers were killed outright on board Britannic, and another six were later found to be missing, having been washed overboard. There were no deaths on board Celtic. Both ships were badly damaged, but Britannic more so, having a large hole below her waterline. Fearing that she would founder, the passengers on board began to panic and rushed the lifeboats. Britannic's captain, pistol in hand, was able to restore some semblance of order, and the boats were filled with women and children, although a few men forced their way on board. After the lifeboats had launched, it was realized that Britannic would be able to stay afloat, and the lifeboats within hailing distance were recalled. The rest made their way over to the Celtic. The two ships remained together through the night, and the next morning were joined by the Wilson Line's Marengo and the British Queen of the Inman Line, and the four slowly made their way into New York Harbor.

A subsequent Court of Enquiry held in New York in June 1887, found that the captains of both ships were guilty of 'not observing regulations for the prevention of collisions at sea'; the Celtic's captain Irvine was censured for failing to reduce speed whilst steaming through fog, whilst captain Perry of the Britannic was censured for failure to sound the ship's whistle before the collision. Another more far reaching recommendation was for the separate 'in' and 'out' shipping lanes be extended right across the Atlantic.

=== Later career ===
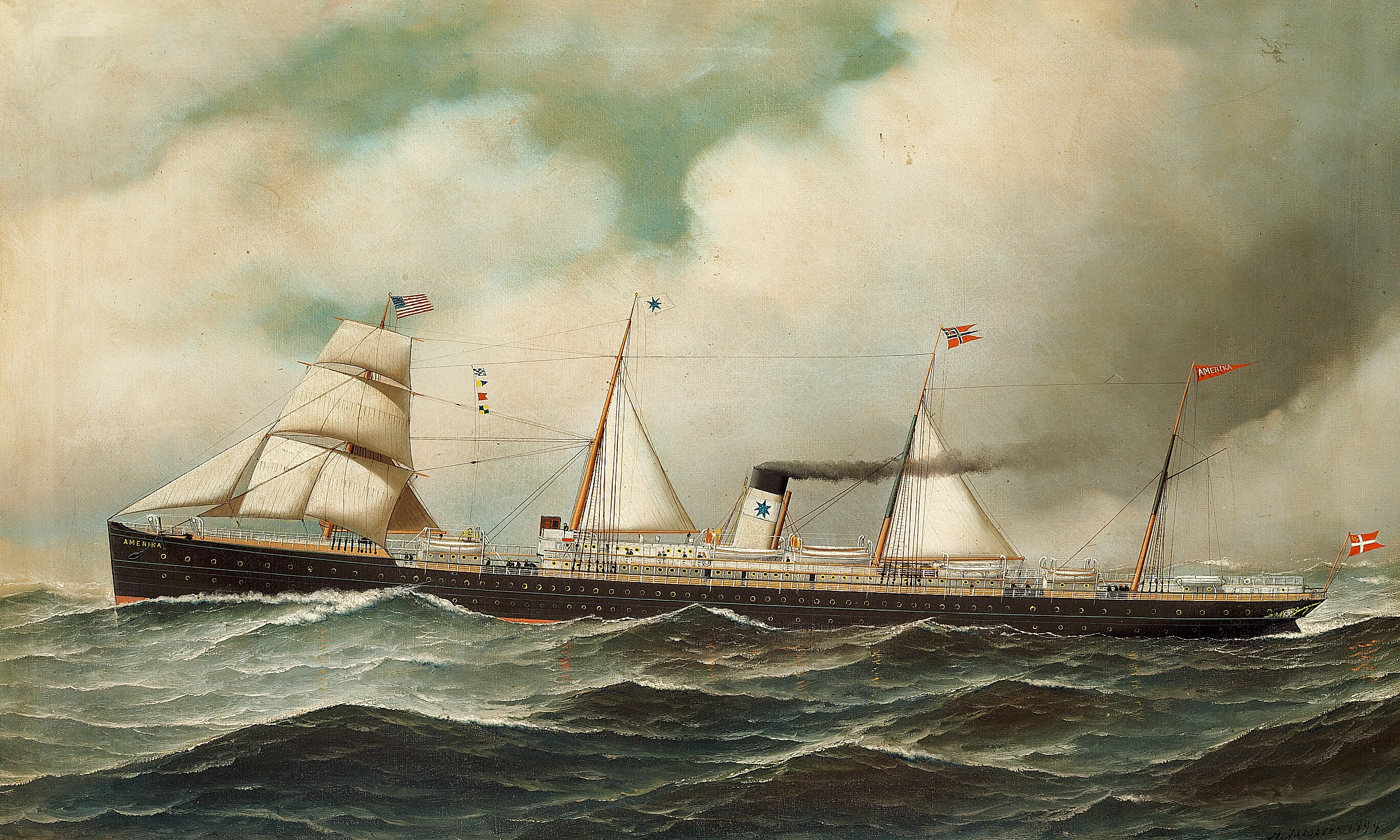
The ship sailing as Amerika

In 1892 she was retired by White Star and put up for sale. In 1893, she was sold to the Danish Thingvalla Line, and renamed Amerika and put on the Copenhagen to New York route, however the ship was too large for the passenger loadings on that route, and the service was not a commercial success, being used for only eight peak season sailings. In 1898, she was sold for scrap.

== See also ==
- RMS Celtic - later namesake ship of the White Star Line
