= SS Republic (1871) =

Ocean liner built in 1871

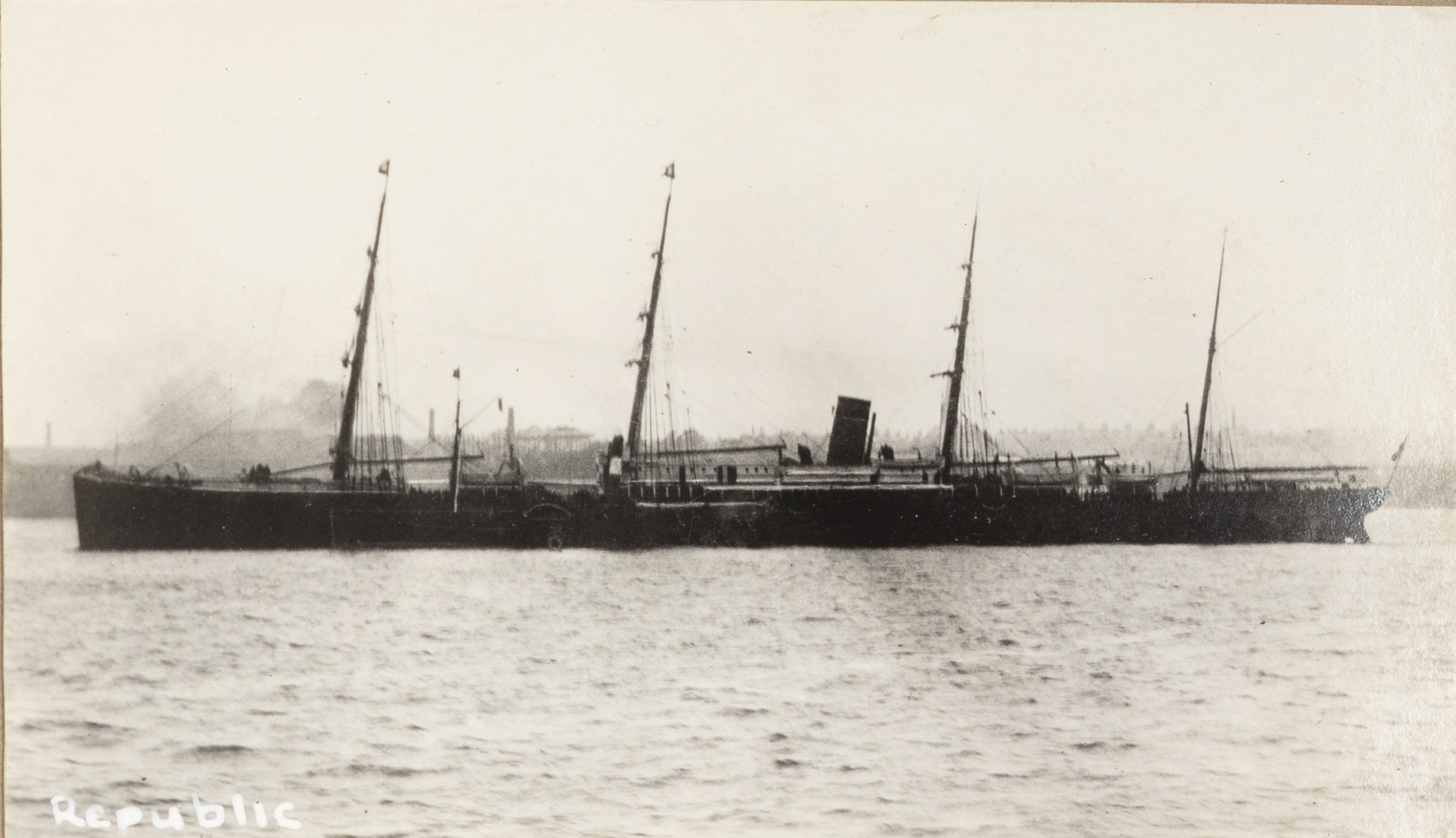
- SS Republic

History
- Name: Republic (1871–1889); Maasdam (c.1889–1902); Vittoria (1902); Citta di Napoli (1902–10)
- Owner: White Star Line (1871–1889); Holland America Line (1889–1902); La Veloce (1902–1910)
- Port of registry: (United Kingdom of Great Britain and Ireland) United Kingdom (1871–89); Netherlands (1889–1902); (Kingdom of Italy) Italy (1902–10)
- Builder: Harland and Wolff, Belfast; Engines by George Forrester and Company, Liverpool
- Yard number: 76
- Launched: 4 July 1871
- Maiden voyage: 1 February 1872
- Fate: Scrapped in 1910

General characteristics
- Class & type: Oceanic-class ocean liner
- Tonnage: 3,708 GRT
- Length: 128.1 m (420 ft)
- Beam: 41 ft (12 m)
- Installed power: Steam
- Propulsion: Single screw, sail

SS Republic was an ocean liner built in 1871 by Harland and Wolff for White Star Line. She was intended to be the last of four vessels forming the Oceanic-class, before two new ships were commissioned. After a rough maiden voyage from Liverpool to New York City on 1 February 1872, the ship was chosen to be on White Star Line's first voyage on the South Atlantic and Pacific line with four other ships, destined for Chile. In 1874, the construction of modern ships SS Germanic and SS Britannic led to SS Republic's becoming the standby vessel of White Star Line. She occupied this position for 15 years, and attempts were made to modernise her in 1888. When RMS Teutonic and RMS Majestic entered service in the following year, the Republic became surplus to White Star's needs.

Republic was sold in 1889 to Holland America Line and was renamed Maasdam, and served with the company for twelve years. In 1902, she was sold to Italian company La Veloce and initially renamed Vittoria, before being renamed again to Città di Napoli. She was used for many years to transport Italian migrants to America. The ship was retired in 1908, and was lent to the Italian government to house victims of the 1908 Messina earthquake. She was scrapped in 1910 in Genoa.

During her service she could carry a varying number of passengers; under White Star Line she could carry 166 first class and over 1,000 steerage passengers; under Holland America Line she could carry 150 first class, 60 second class, and 800 steerage passengers' and as a migrant ship she could carry 1,424 steerage passengers. The facilities on the ship were described as a "floating palace" when she was owned by White Star Line, and were similar to RMS Oceanic, but were slightly modernised.

== History ==
=== White Star Line ===
When Thomas Henry Ismay established White Star Line in 1867, he came to an agreement with Gustav Christian Schwabe in return for financial assistance. Ismay promised to build the company's future ships in Harland and Wolff's shipyards in Belfast, which had been founded by Schwabe's nephew Gustav Wilhelm Wolff. Four ships were originally commissioned to form the Oceanic class, but this was later expanded to six. Republic was the fourth ship of the class and was launched on 4 July 1871; although she was launched as Adriatic, her name was changed to Republic by late August. The name refers to the fact she was launched on Independence Day in the United States.

Her maiden voyage took place on 1 February 1872, from Liverpool to New York City, stopping at Queenstown. During this journey, the ship encountered exceptionally rough weather and high seas, so much so that water entered the ship via the ventilation cowls, and a wave smashed the glass of the skylight to the engine room, allowing much water to enter, which extinguished several boilers. One of the lifeboats broke loose in the rough conditions, badly injuring the ship's Second Mate. As a result of this incident, White Star Line changed their policy towards the stowage of lifeboats in rough weather, as it had been observed that the boats which had been tightly tied down were smashed by the waves, while those which were given more freedom of movement suffered less damage.

At the end of 1872, all six Oceanic class ships were in service, but White Star Line only required five. Ismay attempted to compete with the Pacific Steam Navigation Company on the line of the South Atlantic and the Pacific, destined for Chile. Republic was chosen to serve this route with two smaller mixed-liners, SS Asiatic and SS Tropic, and two other ships, SS Gaelic and SS Belgic.

Faced with this offensive, the Pacific Steam Navigation Company attempted to construct a vessel capable of competing with Republic, the Tacora. Both ships participated in a race between Liverpool and Callao in October 1871; the Tacora was unable to travel beyond Montevideo, but Republic successfully completed the journey. Despite the success of the trip, Republic was placed back on the route to New York, while the South Atlantic and Pacific routes were cancelled, as they were too expensive.

=== Reserve vessel ===
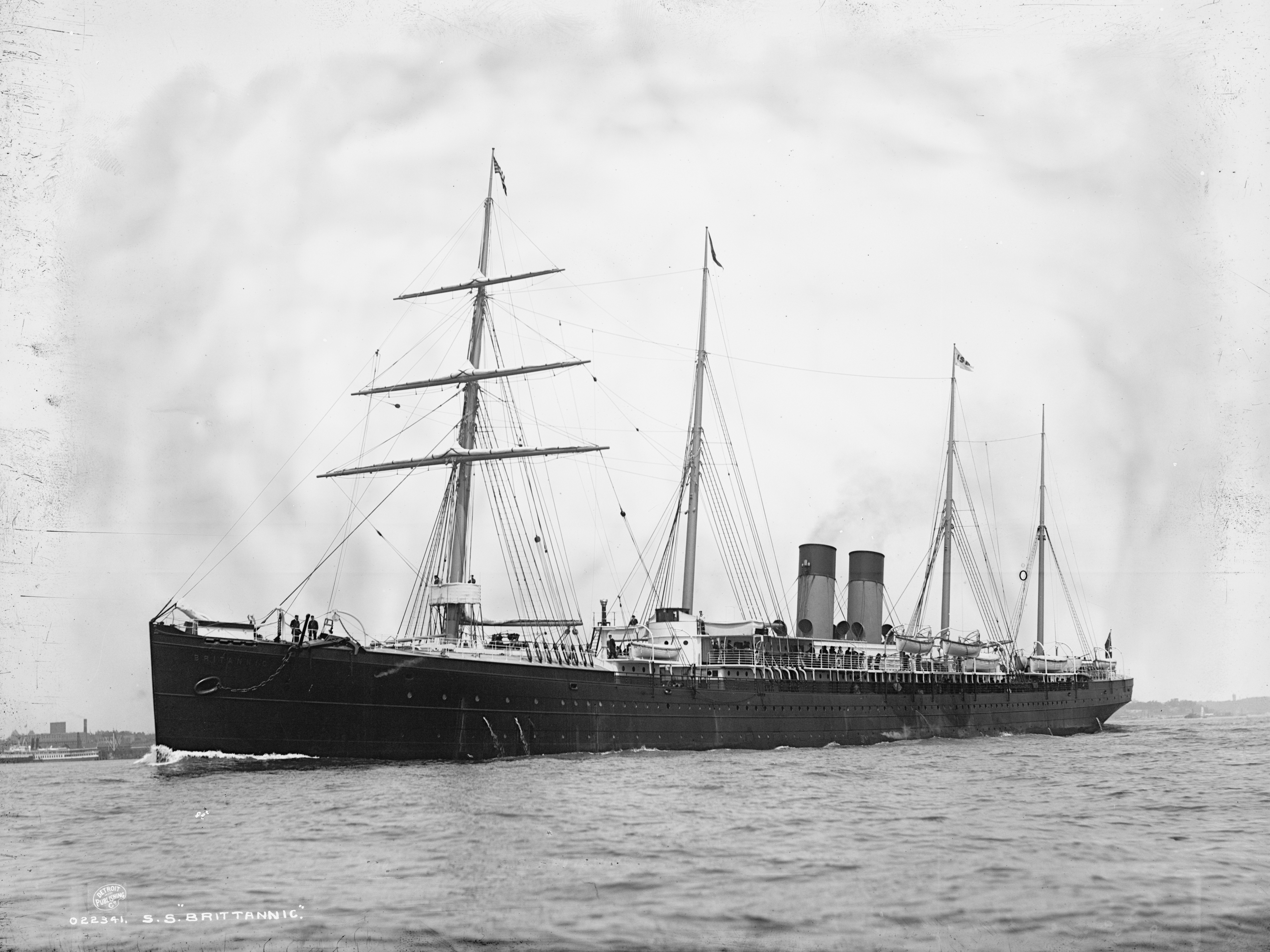
SS Britannic, one of the modern ships that led to SS Republic's becoming unnecessary to White Star Line.

In 1874, White Star Line had two modern ships produced, the SS Britannic and the SS Germanic. The Republic was deemed unnecessary for the regular service to New York and became a standby vessel for the company. Despite this, the SS Republic was used repeatedly in the future, whenever one of the modern vessels had to undergo repairs or maintenance. On 8 August 1875, she discovered the Norwegian barque Velox abandoned in the Atlantic Ocean. Some of her crew were put aboard with the intention of taking Velox in to Queenstown, County Cork.

In February 1879, the ship was badly damaged after being struck on the River Mersey by schooner Ocean Queen. In December of the same year, the Republic faced rough seas during a crossing of the Atlantic, and its smokestack was damaged and had to be repaired by the crew. In December 1880, Republic was damaged and was meant to be towed by German steam vessel Mosel. This vessel did not have enough coal, but Republic managed to reach New York a few days later without assistance. On 9 February 1883, Republic rescued 44 survivors from the Warren Line steamship Glamorgan, which had foundered in the Atlantic Ocean. One of her crew was lost effecting the rescue.

In 1885, White Star Line briefly provided the Inman Line with SS Baltic, as Inman was having financial difficulties. The Republic temporarily served as the replacement for this ship. On 20 September 1885, the Republic collided with the Cunard Line steamer Aurania while leaving the port of New York, following the error of a coast pilot. Republic was sufficiently damaged for the journey to be cancelled, and the ship was put into dry dock.

In 1888, the Republic underwent a redesign, and a second class was added. In January 1889, the ship began her final voyage with White Star Line under the command of Edward Smith, who later became the captain of the RMS Titanic. On 27 January, the ship was grounded a few hours before her arrival in New York; an incident near the boilers killed three trimmers and seriously injured several others. Despite this, the ship underwent repairs and made its last voyage to England.

=== Flagging and retirement ===
The arrival of Teutonic in 1889 and the announcement of RMS Majestic made the Republic unnecessary, and she was put up for sale. The ship was purchased in June 1889 by the Holland America Line, which paid £35,000 to acquire her. Renamed Maasdam, she was immediately sent to G. Forrester & Co. in Liverpool for an overhaul of machinery (for more economical and effective machines) and a reorganisation of her facilities. Once this overhaul was completed, the Maasdam was able to carry 150 first class passengers, 60 second class passengers, and 800 steerage/third class passengers. From 15 March 1890, she served on a route between Rotterdam and New York, and was not damaged during her service with the Holland America Line, which satisfied the company. In 1902, a brief stopover at Boulogne-sur-Mer was added to the route to New York.

In 1902, she was sold to Italian company La Veloce, which first renamed her Vittoria, before quickly switching to Città di Napoli. The ship transported migrants from Genoa, Naples, Palermo, and Gibraltar to New York, and underwent an overhaul which increased her capacity to 1,424 steerage passengers. Her first voyage with the company began on 30 September 1902. Città di Napoli was used until 27 April 1907, when she was withdrawn by the company.

After the 1908 Messina earthquake, La Veloce lent Città di Napoli, North America, and Savoia to the Italian government, in order to shelter the victims. La Veloce re-obtained the ship in 1909, and she was scrapped in Genoa the following year. With a lifetime of 38 years, the ship was the last of the Oceanic class to be scrapped.

== Features ==
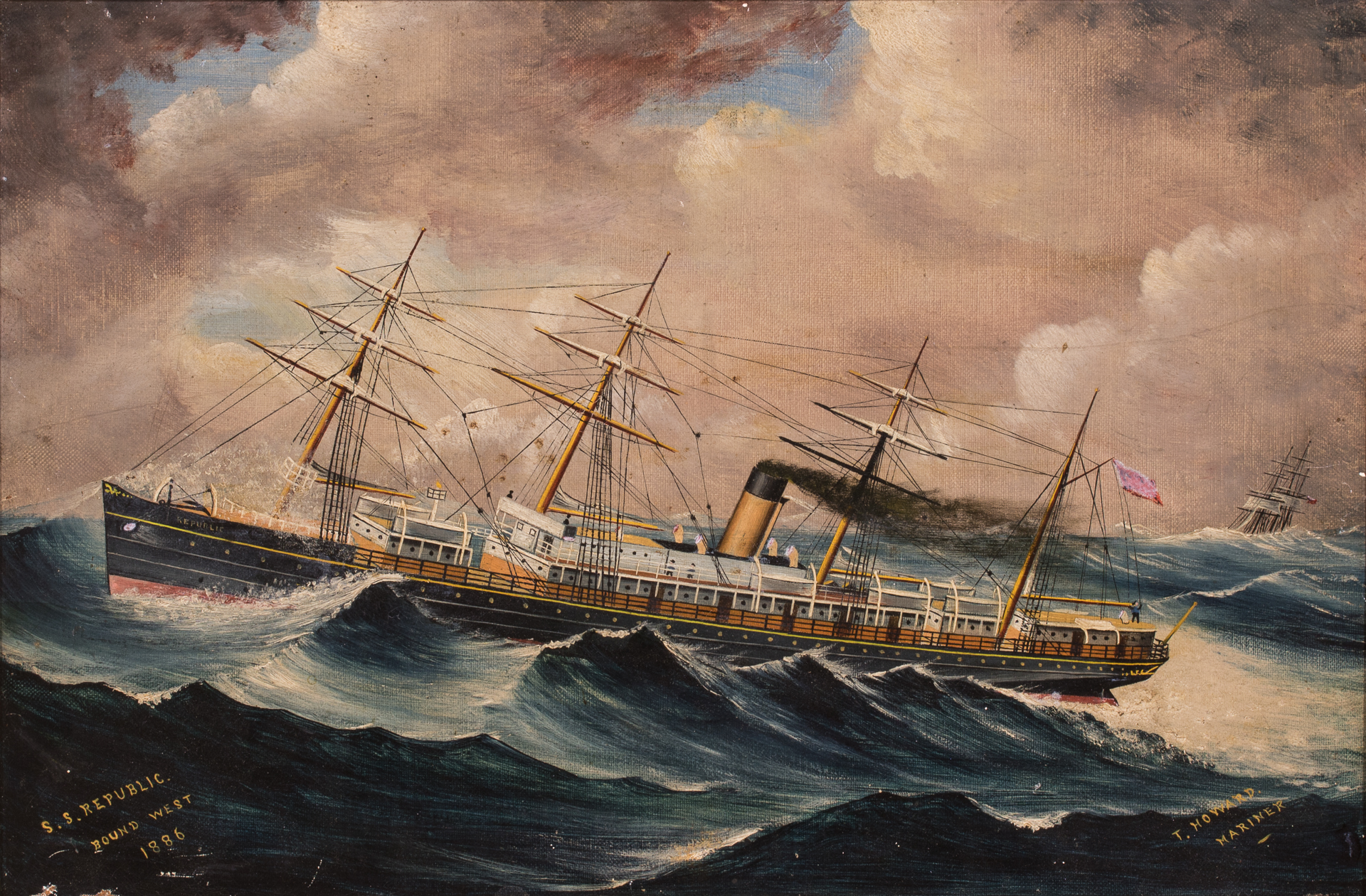
S.S. Republic, Bound West, 1886, by T. Howard (mariner)

Republic shared many characteristics with those of the first liner in the Oceanic series, Oceanic, constructed in 1870. Republic measured 128.1 by 12.4 m (420 by 41 ft) and had a gross register tonnage of 3708. She could be powered by sail, with four masts, but also had funnels painted the colours of White Star Line, brown and black. Her machines came from G. Forrester & Co. of Liverpool and were two reciprocating engines (able to accommodate two cylinders), similar to those of the RMS Atlantic. Although she could theoretically reach speeds of 14.5 knots, she never managed to reach that speed. When the ship was renamed to Maasdam, her propulsion system was redesigned and was equipped with alternative machines, and could support three cylinders.

Republic, like Oceanic, was initially able to carry 1,000 steerage passengers and 166 in first class. The facilities on the Oceanic revolutionized nautical travel, earning it the nickname of "imperial yacht", as she had facilities for wealthy passengers and was more stable than other ships. The first class passengers had bathtubs, a dining room, and chairs rather than benches. There is no precise information regarding the facilities of the Republic, but it is thought that they was similar to Oceanic, but had been improved. A passenger in 1874 described Republic as a "floating palace, with the style and comfort of a Swiss hotel", and said their room was welcoming and gold, and the ship contained a piano, library, smoking room, and barber.

When the ship became the Maasdam, the liner was able to accommodate 150 first class, 60 second class, and 800 steerage passengers. Finally, when she was designed to transport migrants, she could accommodate 1,424 steerage passengers.
