= SS Britannic =

British ocean liner

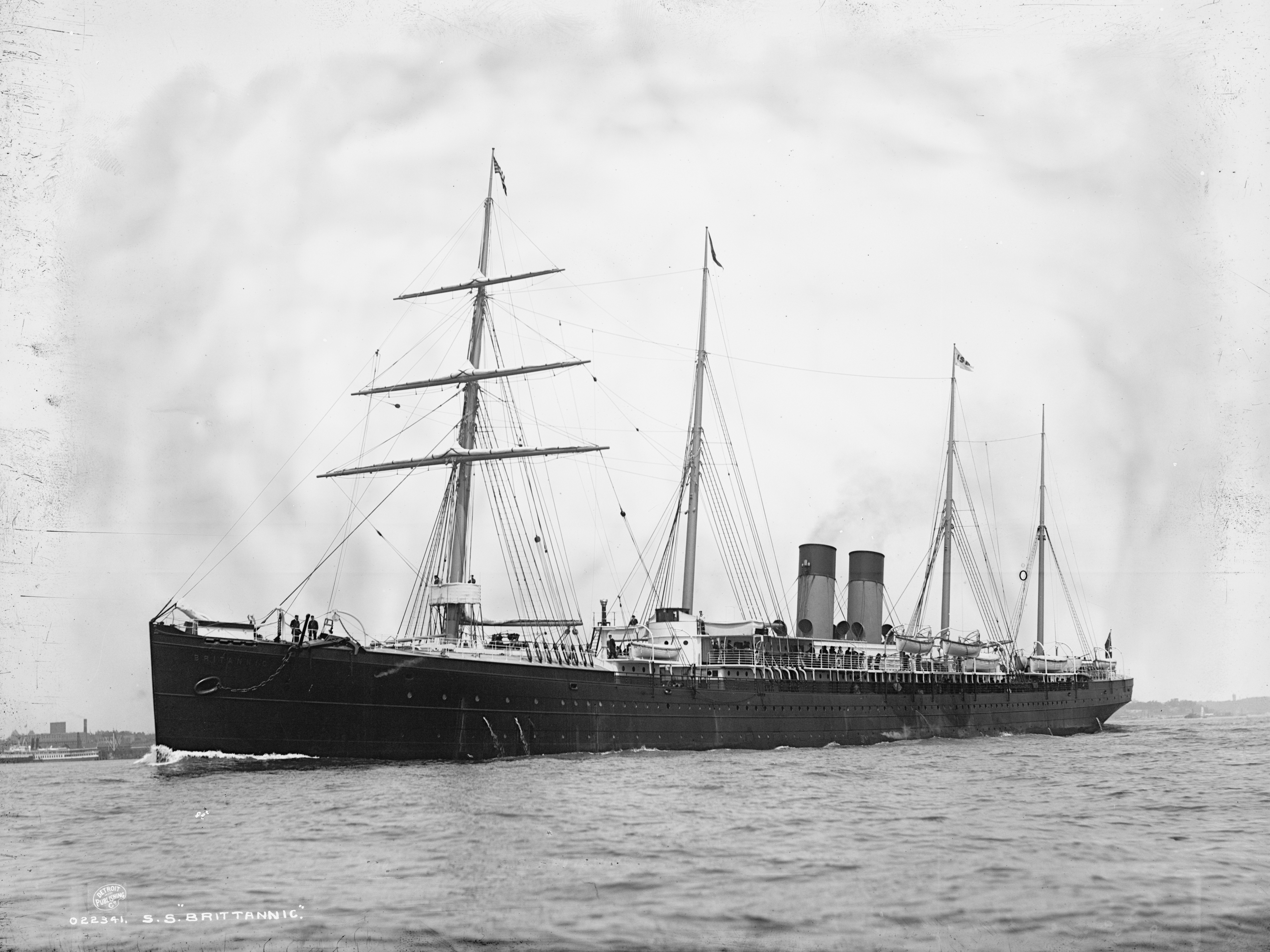

History
- Name: Britannic
- Owner: White Star Line
- Port of registry: (United Kingdom)
- Route: Liverpool to New York standard route.
- Builder: Harland & Wolff, Belfast
- Yard number: 83
- Laid down: August 1872
- Launched: 3 February 1874
- Completed: 6 June 1874
- Maiden voyage: 25 June 1874
- Honors and awards: Blue Riband winner
- Fate: Scrapped in 1903

General characteristics
- Type: Steamship
- Tonnage: 5,004 GRT
- Length: 468 ft (142.65 m)
- Depth: 45 ft (13.72 m)
- Installed power: Steam
- Propulsion: Single screw propeller
- Sail plan: 4 masts, full-rigged ship
- Speed: 16 knots (30 km/h; 18 mph)
- Capacity: 220 Saloon- 1500 Steerage
- Crew: 150

SS Britannic was an ocean liner of the White Star Line. She was the first of three ships of the White Star Line to sail with the Britannic name.

Britannic was a single-screw passenger steamship equipped with sails built for the White Star Line's North Atlantic run. She was initially to be called Hellenic, but, just prior to her launch, her name was changed to Britannic. Together with her sister Germanic, Britannic sailed for nearly thirty years, primarily carrying immigrant passengers on the highly trafficked Liverpool to New York City route. In 1876 she received the Blue Riband, both westbound and eastbound, by averaging almost 16 knots (30 km/h).

== Design and engineering ==
As with nearly all White Star ships Britannic was built at Harland & Wolff, Belfast, largely designed by Edward Harland. She was built at a cost of £200,000 (equivalent to £19,550,000 in 2025), Britannic was the first White Star ship to sport two funnels. She was primarily steam powered but, as was common for steamships of the era, was fitted with auxiliary sails, and was rigged as a four masted barque. She was powered by two compound reciprocating engines, which could produce 4,970 ihp, and could propel the ship via a single screw to a maximum speed of 16 knots (30 km/h; 18 mph). As Harland & Wolff had not yet gained an expertise in building steam engines, the engines were supplied by Messrs Maudslay, Sons & Field of Lambeth. Britannic's hull was subdivided into eight watertight compartments by nine watertight bulkheads.

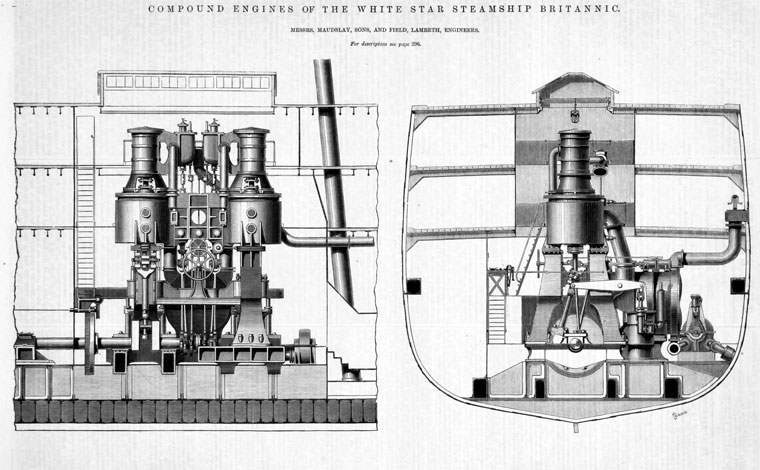
Drawing of Britannic's engines

As built the Britannic incorporated an experimental system which allowed the single propeller to be raised and lowered while still connected to its shaft and without stopping the engine. This was achieved with a flexible coupling and an elongated aperture in the ship's sternpost. This feature was an attempt to overcome the disadvantage of long-hulled single-screw liners, which pitched in heavy seas. In bad weather the stern could rise enough to lift the propeller partially out of the water, reducing thrust and causing unpleasant vibration. The Britannic's adjustable propeller was angled below the horizontal when in the lowest position, to ensure the entire propeller remained submerged. In shallow water the shaft could be raised to the horizontal or slightly upwards to reduce the ship's draught and prevent a blade striking the seabed. The shaft was raised and lowered by a small auxiliary steam engine in the ship's stern, operating rods connected to a bearing collar on the propeller shaft via a worm drive reduction gear.

The system however was not a success, as it made little difference to the tendency for the propeller to lift out of the water in heavy seas, it also proved to have significant downsides: When set at certain angles the flexible coupling caused heavy vibration and the equipment required significantly more maintenance than a standard drive system. It also reduced the efficiency of the propeller in calm weather unless the angle was adjusted to be perfectly parallel to the line of the hull, making Britannic slower than her conventionally-built sistership, the Germanic. In 1875, after only nine voyages, Britannic was taken out of service to be refitted with the same conventional propeller arrangement as her sister - this work required not only removing the propeller mechanism and installing a new drive shaft but also fitting a new bed for the main engine to change its alignment. Once the ship was back in service her performance matched that of the Germanic, allowing the ship to make its own attempts at the Blue Riband.

== Accommodations ==
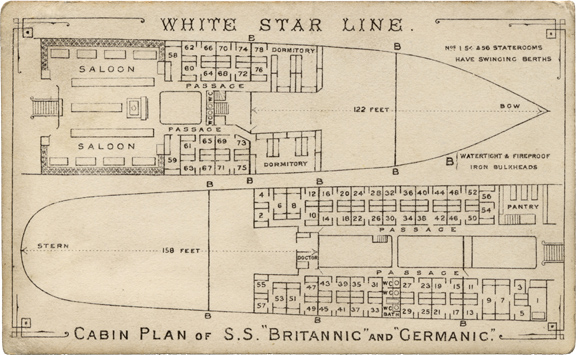
Deck plan of the Saloon accommodation on Britannic and Germanic

The Britannic and her sister Germanic were both built to carry a total of 1,720 passengers in two classes when fully booked, 220 Saloon Class Passengers (title of First Class at that time) and 1,500 Steerage Passengers. Saloon Class facilities, which included a dining saloon, a ladies Boudoir, lounge and smoking rooms, a library and a barber shop were located amidships, and were luxuriously furnished.

The ship had three decks enclosed within the hull, the upper two of which were above the waterline. Britannic and Germanic's saloon accommodations, consisting of a number of two- and four-berth cabins were located in the center of the upper of these decks. The steerage accommodations were located on the lower two decks and consisted of large open berth dormitory type cabins arranged around the edge of the deck, with an open space for the passengers to congregate in the center. The steerage accommodation was of higher quality than was typical for ships of the period, being well lighted, ventilated and heated. An innovative feature of Britannic and Germanic was a ventilation system driven by a large steam powered fan, which could propel hot or cold air to every portion of the ship.

== Career ==
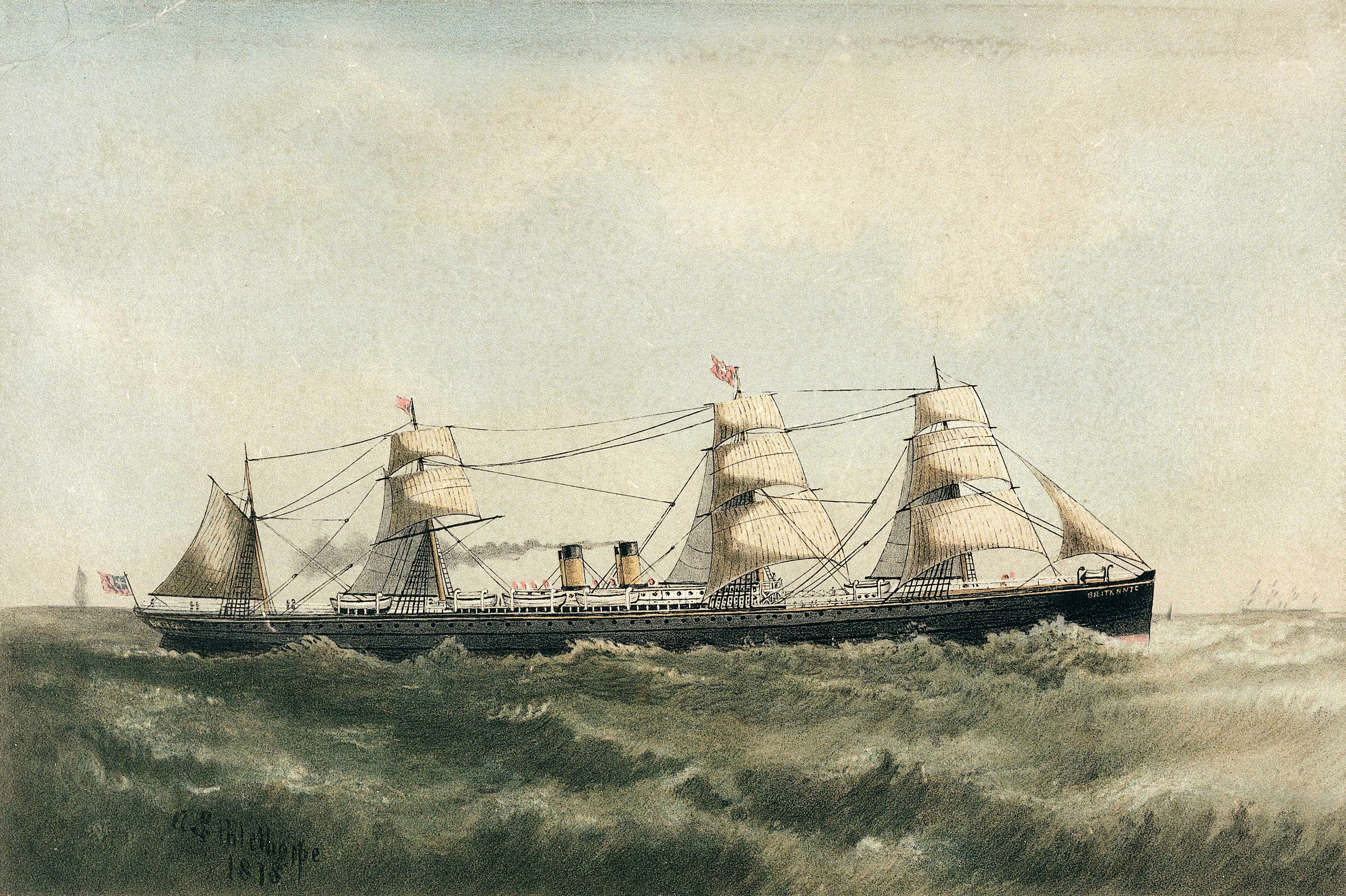
Drawing from 1878 of Britannic at sea

Launched on 3 February 1874, Britannic set out on her maiden voyage on 25 June 1874 from Liverpool to New York. On 8 March 1876, a fire developed in one of her forward holds whilst she was under repair at Belfast. The fire was extinguished and the ship was only slightly damaged. Following the work to modify her propeller system, she became competitive for the Blue Riband. In November 1876, she captured the westbound Blue Riband, averaging a speed of 15.44 knots (28.59 km/h; 17.77 mph), and a month later set the eastbound record as well, averaging 15.95 knots (29.54 km/h; 18.35 mph), becoming the only White Star ship ever to hold both records simultaneously. She lost the westbound record to her sister, Germanic, in April 1877 and the eastbound one to the Guion Line's Arizona in July 1879.

Her first four years in service passed without incidents. However, on 26 October 1878 she ran down and sank the tug Willie at Wapping, Middlesex whilst on a voyage from London to Dundee, Forfarshire. The tug's crew were rescued. On 31 March 1881, she collided with and sank the schooner Julia near Belfast. The crew however were all saved, and the undamaged Britannic continued her voyage. Later that year on 4 July 1881 Britannic had another mishap, when she ran aground in fog off Kilmore, County Wexford, Ireland, en route to Liverpool and remained stuck for several days. The passengers boarded the lifeboats and were safely landed at Wexford. The ship was at first thought to be undamaged, but soon sprang a leak in her engine room. A team of salvage experts from Liverpool was quickly despatched, and set to work with pumps and divers to save the ship. The leak was patched up, the water pumped out, and her cargo was unloaded onto barges to lighten the ship, and on 8 July she was re-floated. On 9 July Britannic left for Liverpool under tow of tugs, but soon sprang another leak in her engine room which flooded within the hour, and she was hastily beached at Wexford Bay. She had to be patched up and pumped again before returning to Liverpool on 14 July for repairs. As the damage was only minor and easily repaired, she re-entered service on schedule on 18 July. In 1883 Bram Stoker, the Irish author famed for Dracula is believed to have crossed the Atlantic onboard Britannic. On 13 January 1887, she collided with the steamship St. Fillans in the River Mersey. Both vessels sustained slight damage.

=== SS Celtic collision ===
On 19 May 1887, at about 5:25pm, the White Star liner SS Celtic collided with Britannic in thick fog about 350 miles (560 km) east of Sandy Hook, New Jersey. Celtic, with 870 passengers, had been steaming westbound for New York City, while Britannic, carrying 450 passengers, was on the second day of her eastward journey to Liverpool. The two ships collided at almost right angles, with Celtic burying her prow 10 feet (3 m) in the aft port side of Britannic. Celtic rebounded and hit two more times, before sliding past behind Britannic.

Six steerage passengers were killed outright on board Britannic and another six were later found to be missing, having been washed overboard. There were no deaths on board Celtic. Both ships were badly damaged, but Britannic more so, having a large hole below her waterline. Fearing that she would founder, the passengers on board began to panic and rushed the lifeboats. Britannic's captain, Hugh Hamilton Perry, pistol in hand, was able to restore some semblance of order, and the boats were filled with women and children, although a few men forced their way on board. After the lifeboats had launched, it was realised that Britannic would be able to stay afloat, and the lifeboats within hailing distance were recalled. The rest made their way over to Celtic. The two ships remained together through the night and the next morning were joined by the Wilson Line's Marengo and British Queen of the Inman Line, and the four slowly made their way into New York Harbor. Britannic was repaired at New York and was out of service for nearly a month.

Two-and-a-half-year-old Eleanor Roosevelt was on board the Britannic at the time of the collision, with her father Elliott, mother Anna and aunt Tissie. Eleanor was lowered into a lifeboat, screaming and protesting. She and her parents were taken to the Celtic and eventually returned to New York. Eleanor raised a huge protest at the prospect of going back on board a ship to continue the family's trip to Europe. Her parents went on to Europe, leaving the little girl with a maternal aunt. Eleanor had a lifelong fear of water and ships as a result of this incident.

A subsequent Court of Enquiry held in New York in June 1887, found that the captains of both ships were guilty of 'not observing regulations for the prevention of collisions at sea'; the Celtic's captain Irvine was censured for failing to reduce speed whilst steaming through fog, whilst captain Perry of the Britannic was censured for failure to sound the ship's whistle before the collision. Another more far reaching recommendation was for the separate 'in' and 'out' shipping lanes be extended right across the Atlantic.

=== Later career ===
On 2 January 1890, Britannic collided with Czarowitz—a British brigantine bound from Fowey, Cornwall, England, to Runcorn, Cheshire, England, with a cargo of china clay—in the Crosby Channel as Czarowitz was about to enter the River Mersey. Czarowitz sank.

On one journey in August 1891 Britannic, now 17 years old, recorded her fastest-ever crossing from New York to Queenstown, making the journey in 7 days, 6 hours, and 52 min.

==== Naval service ====
Britannic made her final transatlantic voyage for White Star in August 1899; following this, she was requisitioned by the Royal Navy and converted for use as a troopship to transport soldiers to the Second Boer War in South Africa, gaining the designation HMT (hired military transport) #62. During this period, under the command of Bertram Fox Hayes, Britannic transported 37,000 troops to and from the conflict over three years. In November 1900, Britannic sailed to Australia with a guard of honour to represent Great Britain at the inauguration of the Australian Commonwealth. Upon arrival, she took part in the fleet review at Sydney Harbour to mark the occasion. On the return journey, she grounded in the Suez Canal and had to be refloated.

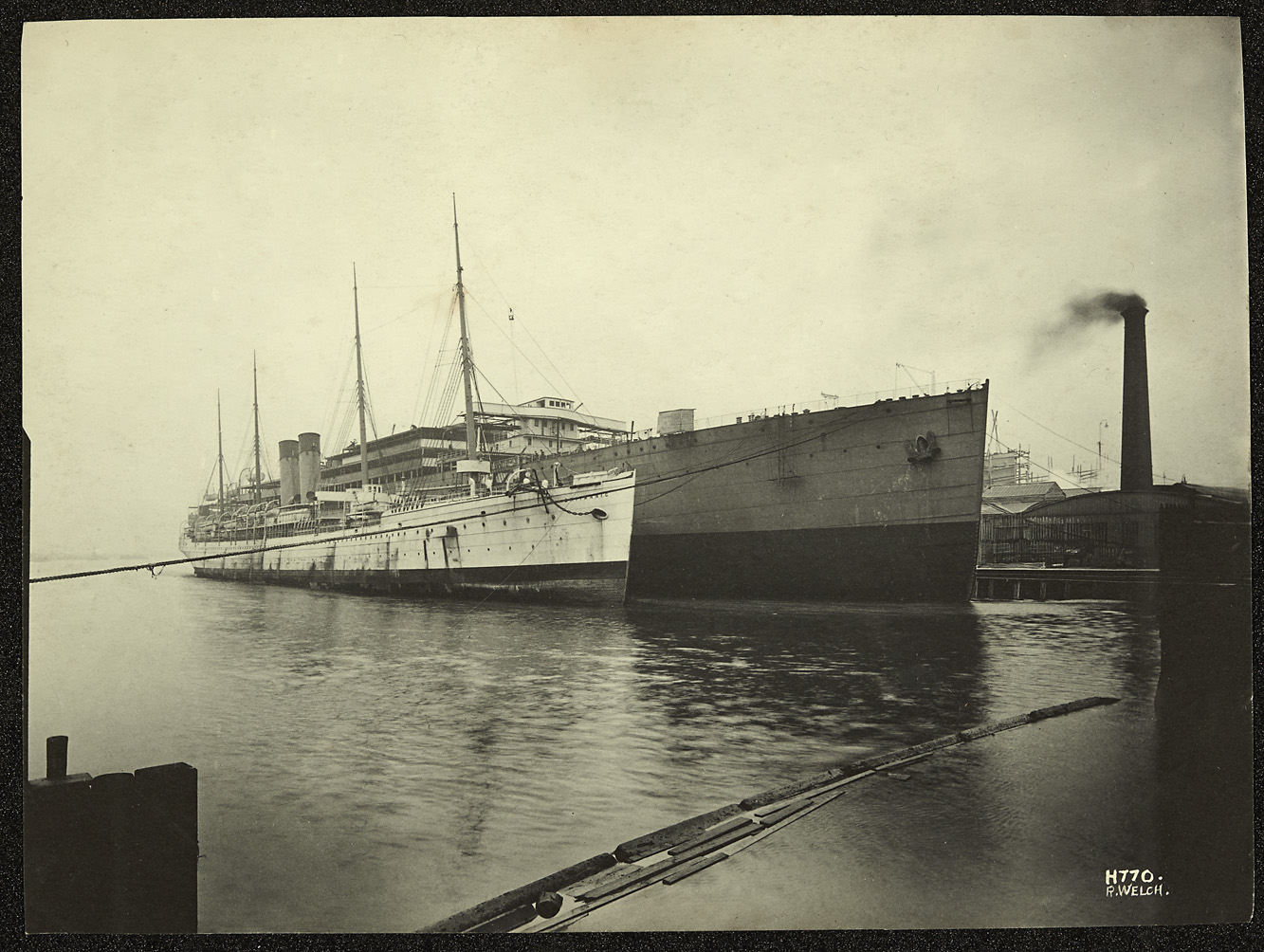
Britannic laid up alongside the unfinished RMS Cedric, just before being scrapped

=== Demise ===
Following the end of the war in October 1902, Britannic was released from government service and returned to White Star who sent her to her builders in Belfast for a survey, with the intention that she might be refurbished and modernised for further use. It was proposed that Britannic could be refitted with more modern triple-expansion engines, as her sister Germanic had been, and that her interiors could be refurbished. The builders report in 1903 concluded that the expenditure required to bring the 29-year-old ship up to modern standards would not be cost effective; instead, Britannic was sold for scrap for £11,500, and on 11 August 1903 she left Belfast under tow to Hamburg, Germany, where she was broken up.

== See also ==
- SS Germanic (1874) - sister ship
- HMHS Britannic
- MV Britannic (1929)
- List of White Star Line ships

Records
Preceded by City of Berlin	Holder of the Blue Riband (Westbound record); 1876–1877	Succeeded by Germanic
Preceded by Germanic	Blue Riband (Eastbound record); 1876–1879	Succeeded by Arizona
