= SS City of Antwerp =

Single screw steamship (built 1867)

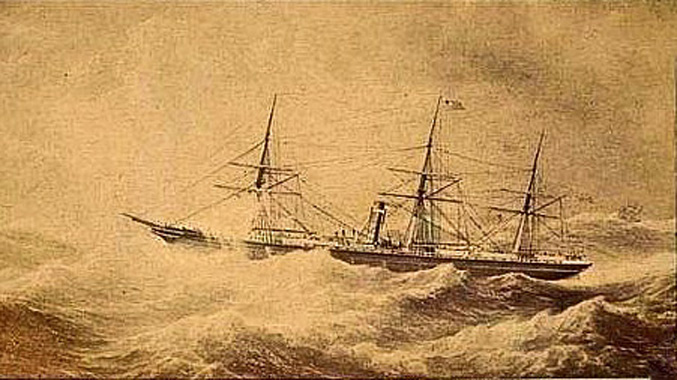

History
- Name: City of Antwerp
- Owner: 1867: Tod & Macgregor; 1867–79: Inman Line; 1879-90 Johnston Line
- Port of registry: Liverpool
- Route: Trans-Atlantic route
- Ordered: 1865
- Builder: Tod & Macgregor, Partick, Glasgow
- Yard number: 137
- Launched: 8 November 1866
- Completed: February 1867
- Maiden voyage: 20 February 1867
- Fate: Presumably caught fire, 1 December 1890

General characteristics
- Type: Ocean liner
- Tonnage: 2391 grt
- Length: 332.0 ft (101.194 m)
- Beam: 39.4 ft (12.00912 m)
- Depth: 25.9 ft (7.89432 m)
- Propulsion: 2-cylinder beam engine; single screw

The S.S. City of Antwerp was a single screw steamship built out of iron for the Inman Line in 1867. She was built by Tod & Macgregor, Glasgow, Scotland.

== Inman Line service ==
Shortly after being handed to the Inman Line by Tod & Macgregor she entered service. Her maiden voyage was on 20 February 1867. She had a successful career with the Inman Line until 1879 when she was sold off to the Johnston Line.

== Johnston Line service ==
She was sold to the Johnston line by the Inman Line in 1879 and had her name changed to Thanemore. She served as Thanemore until December 1890, when she caught fire and burnt up around 1500 nautical miles off the American coast, east of Newfoundland. The given coordinates of her sinking are 47°N 43°W.

== Sister ships ==
- SS City of Glasgow
- SS City of Manchester
- SS City of Philadelphia
- SS City of Baltimore
- SS City of Washington
- SS City of New York
- SS City of London
- SS City of Cork
- SS City of Dublin
- SS City of Boston
- SS City of New York
- SS City of Paris
- SS City of Brooklyn
- SS City of Brussels
- SS City of Montreal
