= SS City of Paris =

SS City of Paris may refer to one of these ships named after the French capital city of Paris:

- SS City of Paris (1865), operated by the Inman Line and later sold to a French company and renamed Tonquin.
- SS City of Paris (1888), operated by the Inman Line and later the American Line; won the Blue Riband on a number of occasions; served as troopship in the First World War; scrapped in 1923.
- SS City of Paris (1907), operated by Ellerman Lines. During the First World War, while carrying 168 crew and 28 passengers, she was torpedoed and sunk. All on but 74 people were killed, most of them from exposure at sea. It was the worst disaster for Ellerman Lines in the First World War.
- SS City of Paris (1920), operated by Ellerman Lines; used as a troopship in the Second World War, being damaged by a mine in 1939, but survived; scrapped in 1956
