= SS City of Brussels =

Coordinates: 53.564°N 3.542°W

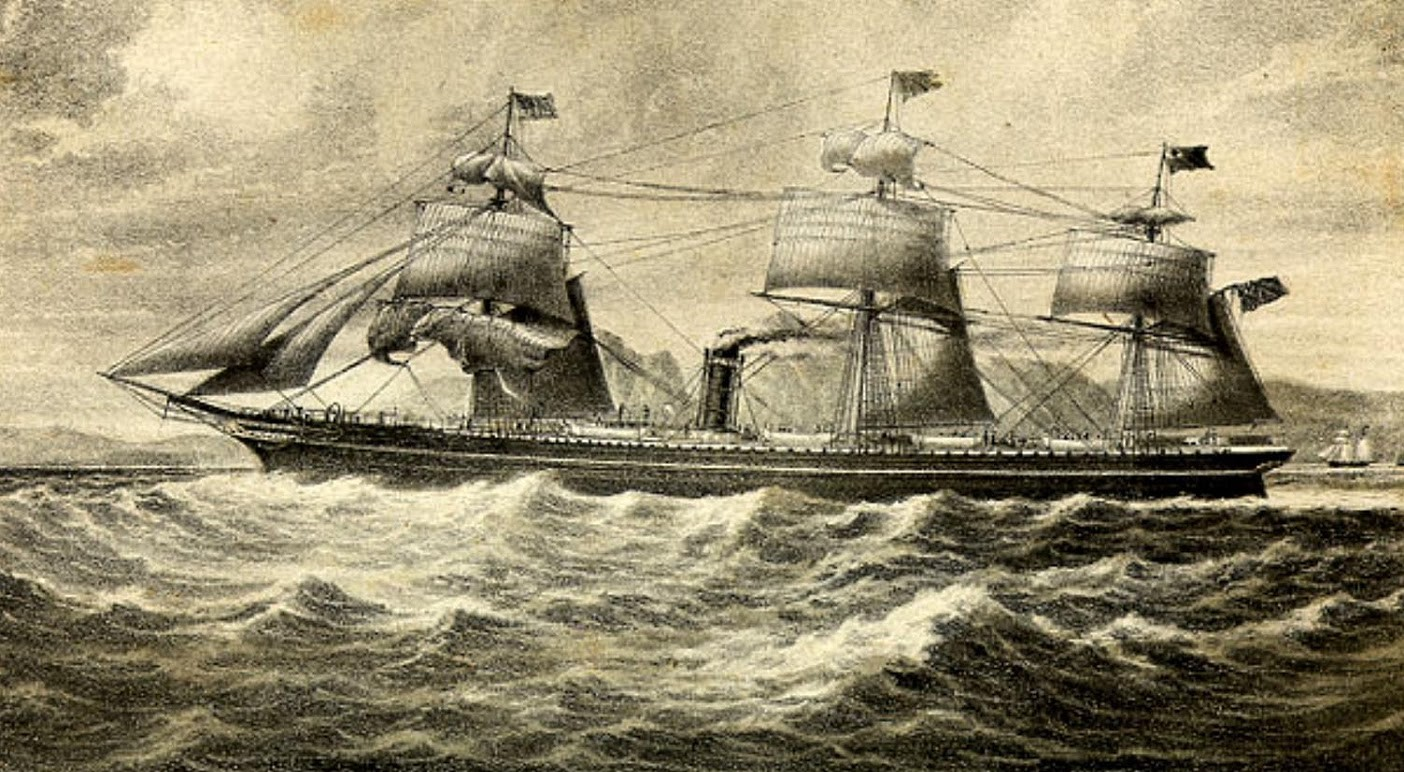
- City of Brussels

History

United Kingdom
- Name: City of Brussels
- Owner: Inman Line
- Route: Atlantic crossing
- Builder: Tod and Macgregor, Partick, Glasgow
- Launched: 11 August 1869
- Fate: Sunk in collision 7 January 1883

General characteristics
- Type: Passenger liner
- Tonnage: 3,100 tons
- Length: 390 ft (120 m)
- Beam: 40 ft (12 m)
- Sail plan: 3 masts

City of Brussels was a British passenger liner that set the record for the fastest Atlantic eastbound voyage in 1869, becoming the first record breaker driven by a screw. Built by Tod and Macgregor, she served the Inman Line until 1883 when she sank with the loss of ten people after a collision while entering the Mersey.

== Development and design ==
In 1866, Inman commissioned City of Paris, which was the equal of the best steamers in the Cunard express mail fleet. The next year, responsibility for mail contracts was transferred from the Admiralty to the Post Office and opened for bid. Inman was awarded one of the three weekly New York mail services and the fortnightly route to Halifax, Nova Scotia formerly held by Cunard. These contracts enabled Inman to continue building its own fleet of express liners.

City of Brussels was designed as the partner for City of Paris, and was built at the same as the Meadowside yard of Tod & Macgregor on the River Clyde. As built, the iron-hulled liner carried 200 first class and 600 steerage. She had an overall length of 390 feet and a 40-feet beam, with a ratio of waterline length to beam of 9.5:1, making her almost the first "long boat". Another innovation was her steam steering gear, which was the first installed on a liner after Great Eastern. She was powered by a steam trunk engine of 600 nhp, also made by Tod & Macgregor.

== Service history ==
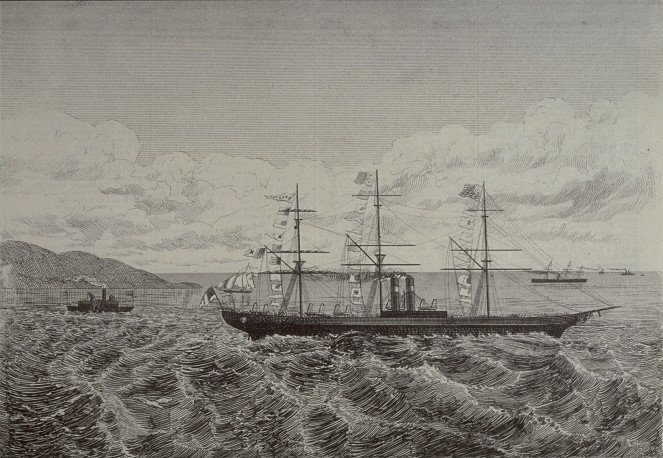
City of Brussels after modifications

In her first year of service, City of Brussels took the eastbound record with a New York - Queenstown passage of 7 days, 20 hours, 33 minutes with a speed of 14.74 knots (27.30 km/h; 16.96 mph). However, in 1870 she illustrated the problem with single screw liners of this power when she lost her propeller and returned to Queenstown by sail.

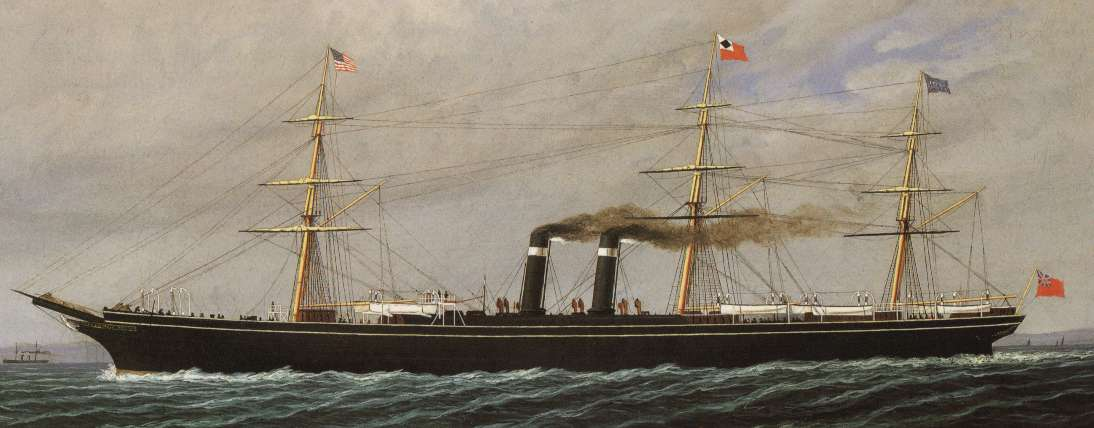
City of Brussels

Three years after she was commissioned, City of Brussels returned to the ship yard for an extra deck and other modifications to bring her into line with the innovative ships built for the new White Star Line. She emerged with a revised tonnage of 3,750. In 1876, she was re-engined with a more compact and efficient compound engine that reduced her coal consumption from 110 tons per day to 65 tons, and increased her cargo capacity. At this time she received a second funnel. However, these modifications did not resolve the problem with her shaft as on 23 April 1877 her shaft again broke, and she returned to port under sail after being posted as overdue.

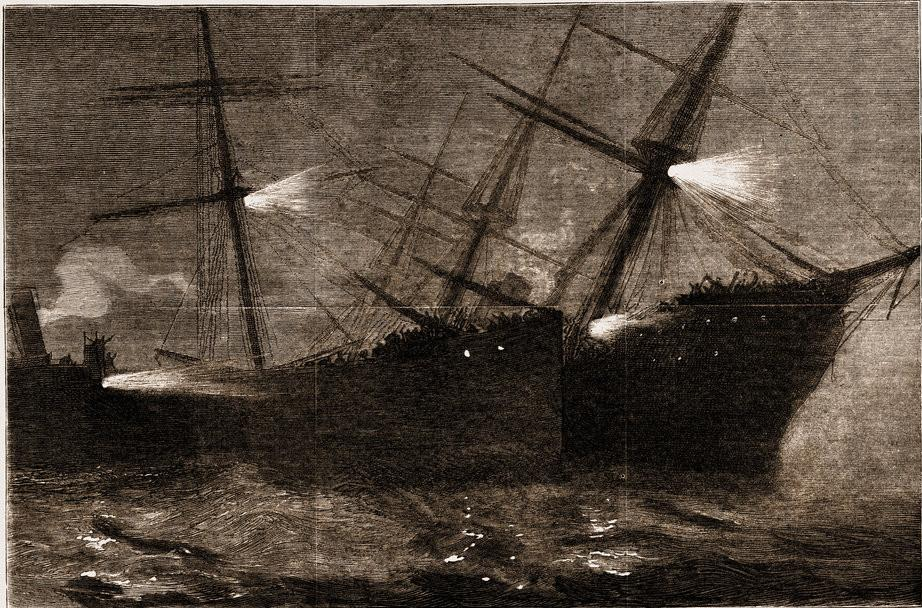
The fatal collision of the City of Brussels and the Kirby Hall, 1883

On the morning of 7 January 1883, City of Brussels encountered heavy fog entering the Mersey after dropping off some passengers and the mail at Queenstown on her return from New York. Her captain ordered the ship to stop until the weather cleared. Kirby Hall, a new cargo ship on her maiden voyage from the River Clyde for Bombay via Liverpool, struck City of Brussels on the starboard side forward of the bridge, almost cutting her in two. When the vessels separated, water flooded the exposed holds and quickly spread to the engine room of City of Brussels and she sank within 20 minutes with a loss of two passengers and eight of her crew. Sixty four passengers and ninety three crew were taken on board Kirby Hall from the liner's boats. In the subsequent Board of Trade Inquiry it was held that Kirby Hall, although slowing, has caused the collision by failing to stop her engines when first hearing the liner's whistle.

In 1984, the wreck of City of Brussels was found by Wirral Sub-Aqua Club in 24 metres (79 ft) of water, just off the Mersey Bar. The bell from the wreck was brought up that day. The bell was subsequently sold via the receiver of wrecks by sealed bid. Wirral Sub-Aqua Club member Mr David Lewis of Ellesmere Port was the successful purchaser. Its current whereabouts are unknown.

In 1998 one of the ship's two Cannons was raised by the Mersey Divers branch of the British Sub Aqua Club. After a 6-year conservation process it is now on display at the club's boathouse.

Records
Preceded by Scotia	Blue Riband (Eastbound Record); 1869–1873	Succeeded by Baltic
