= RMS Scotia =

British steamship

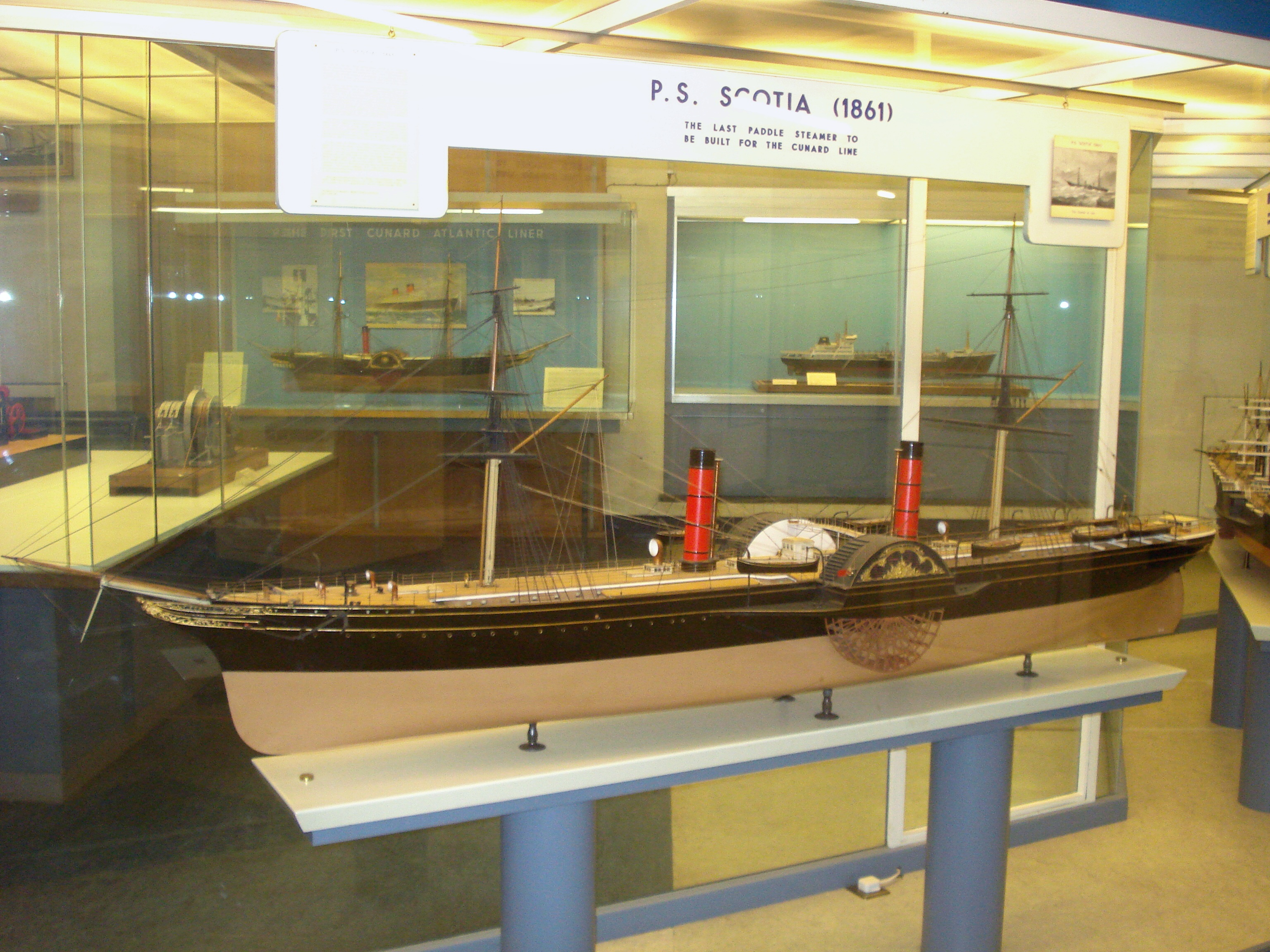
- A model of Cunard's Scotia at the Science Museum in London

History

United Kingdom
- Name: Scotia
- Namesake: Scotia
- Owner: Cunard Line
- Route: Atlantic crossing.
- Builder: Robert Napier and Sons, Glasgow
- Launched: 25 June 1861
- Maiden voyage: 10 May 1862
- Refit: As a cable layer, 1879
- Fate: Lost off Guam, 1904

General characteristics
- Type: Passenger liner
- Tonnage: 3,871 GRT
- Length: 400 ft (120 m)
- Beam: 47 ft (14 m)
- Installed power: 1 x twin-cylinder, 4,000 hp (3,000 kW) side-lever engine
- Sail plan: 2 masts
- Capacity: Approximately 270 saloon and 50 second class passengers.

Scotia was a British passenger liner operated by the Cunard Line that won the Blue Riband in 1863 for the fastest westbound transatlantic voyage. She was the last oceangoing paddle steamer, and as late as 1874 she made Cunard's second fastest voyage. Laid up in 1876, Scotia was converted to a twin-screw cable layer in 1879. She served in her new role for twenty-five years until she was wrecked off of Guam in March 1904.

== Development and design ==
As a result of competition from the Collins Line, Cunard ordered Persia of 1856, the first iron Blue Riband winner. Scotia was originally planned as a sister for Persia. However, the project was delayed after the loss of the Collins Arctic and Pacific left Cunard without effective competition on the express service. When Scotia was finally built, she was a larger edition of Persia with an extra deck. Safety improvements included seven watertight compartments, a reinforced forward bulkhead and buoyancy chambers.

There was considerable disagreement among Cunard's partners concerning the choice of paddle wheels for the new liner as screw propulsion was proving itself superior. While the firm already owned screw steamers for the secondary service, Samuel Cunard insisted that paddle wheels be retained for what was to be the line's premier unit. However, they agreed to order a second mail steamer, China, to test screws in the express service.

As completed by Robert Napier and Sons of Glasgow, Scotia was the second largest ship in the world after Great Eastern. She carried 273 first class passengers and 50 in second class. Scotia did not have quarters for steerage. Her two-cylinder side-lever engine produced 4,000 horsepower (3,000 kW), and consumed 164 tons of coal per day.

== Service history ==
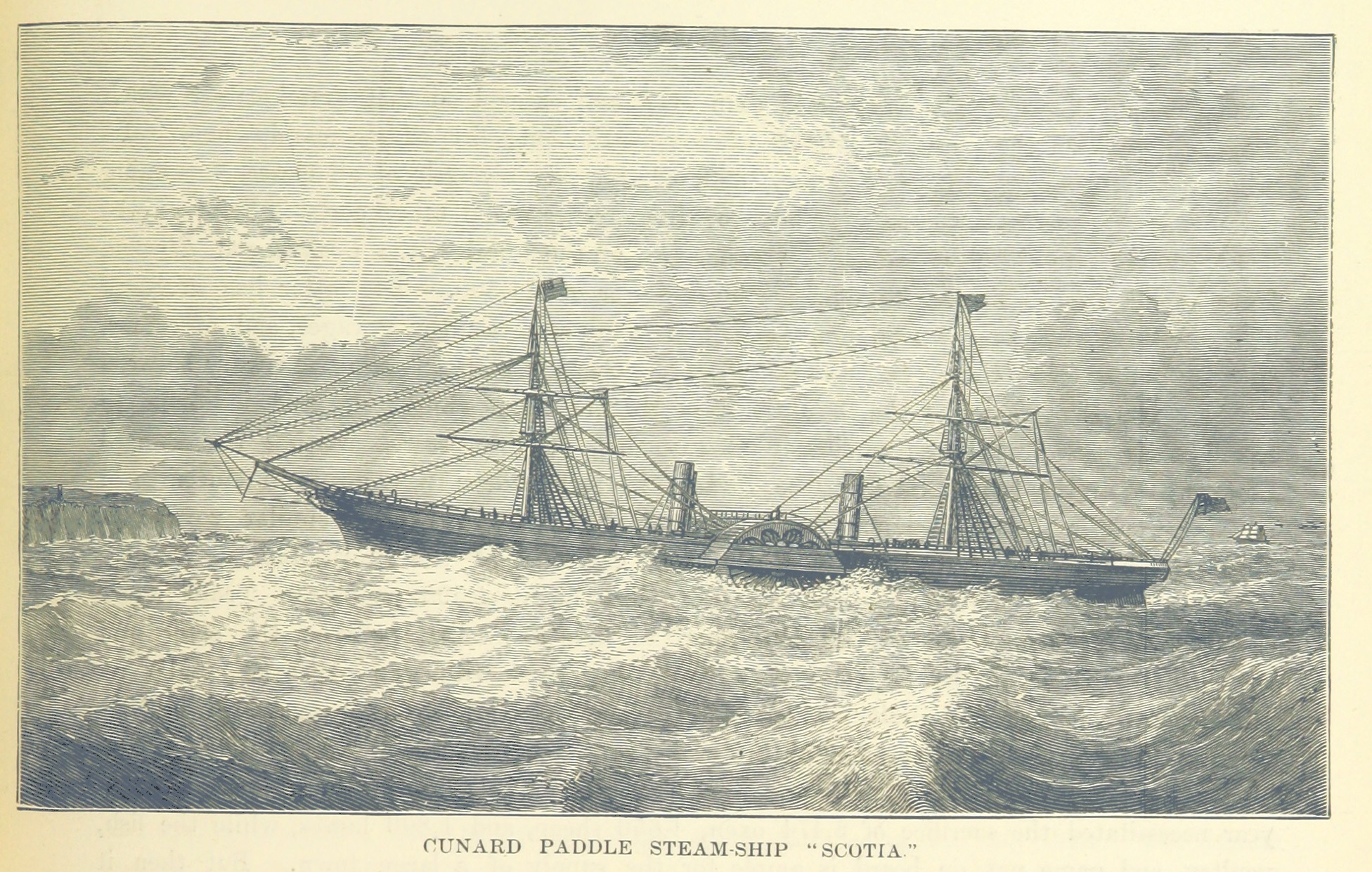
RMS Scotia underway

Scotia and China relieved Asia and Africa on the New York express route, and the older steamers were transferred to the Boston trade. In July 1863, Scotia won the Blue Riband with a Queenstown – New York voyage of 14.46 knots (26.78 km/h; 16.64 mph), beating Persia's record by a full knot. Scotia is generally credited with retaining the Blue Riband until 1872 when she was surpassed by Adriatic of the White Star Line. While Gibbs credits the screw steamer City of Paris of the Inman Line with a Blue Riband voyage in 1866, Scotia is universally considered as the equal of any pre-Oceanic liner.

Although she offered only first-class accommodations used by passengers such as Theodore Roosevelt's family, Scotia was not consistently profitable and China proved to be the better investment. China's coal consumption was half of Scotia's while China carried more cargo and was only a knot slower. The firm quickly ordered two additional screw steamers to replace the last wooden paddlers on the New York express service. Scotia herself remained as Cunard's largest unit until Bothnia and Scythia were completed in 1874. The conversion of the French Line's Ville Du Havre to screws in 1873 left Scotia as the last paddler on the Atlantic. She was finally withdrawn in 1876 and offered for sale.

Three years later, Scotia was converted to twin screws and refitted as a cable layer. She was enlarged to 4,667 GRT and commissioned by the Telegraph Construction and Maintenance Company. In 1896, Scotia suffered an explosion off Plymouth that destroyed her fore-part. She was only saved by the stoutness of her construction. Repaired, Scotia was sold in 1902 to the Commercial Pacific Cable Company.

On 11 March 1904, Scotia approached Guam to deliver cable and spares when she went off course while entering Apra Harbor and ran hard aground on a nearby reef. Weather conditions deteriorated and the ship broke in two and sank. The wreck is now a popular diving location.

== In fiction ==
Scotia makes an appearance in the 1870 novel Twenty Thousand Leagues Under the Seas by Jules Verne. On 13 April 1867 the ship is accidentally struck by the submarine Nautilus: "Two and a half metres below the water-line appeared a neat hole in the form of an isosceles triangle." Thanks to its watertight compartments, Scotia makes it safely to Liverpool.

In the second Sherlock Holmes: The Legend Begins book, the SS Scotia is the ship Sherlock and his accomplices travel on.

Records
Preceded by Persia	Holder of the Blue Riband (Westbound record); 1863–1872	Succeeded by Adriatic
Preceded by Persia	Blue Riband (Eastbound record); 1863–1869	Succeeded by City of Brussels
