= SS City of Boston =

Passenger steamship

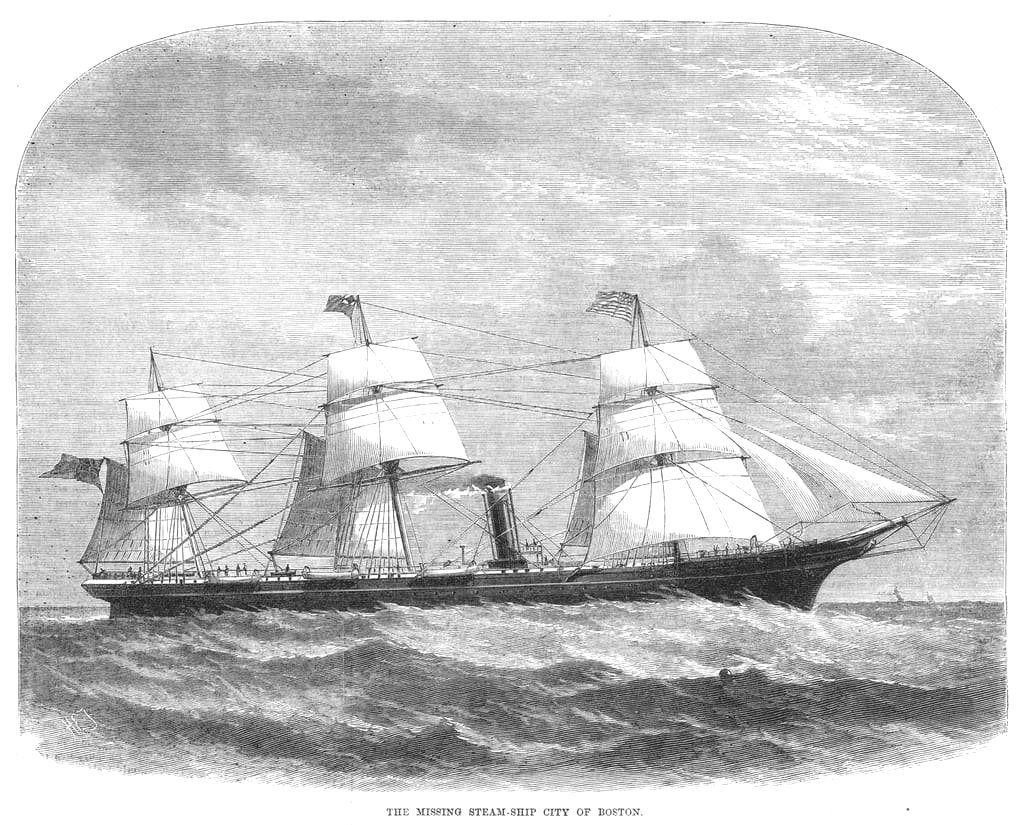
- City of Boston, by Henry Spernon Tozer

History

United Kingdom
- Name: City of Boston
- Operator: Inman Line
- Builder: Tod and Macgregor, Partick, Glasgow
- Yard number: 131
- Launched: 15 November 1864
- Fate: Lost 1870

General characteristics
- Tonnage: 2213 grt, 1650 nrt
- Length: 305 ft (93 m)
- Beam: 39 ft (12 m)
- Depth: 18.1 ft (5.5 m)
- Propulsion: 2 × steam engines (600 hp total); single screw
- Sail plan: Three-masted (ship rigged)
- Speed: 12 kn (22 km/h; 14 mph)

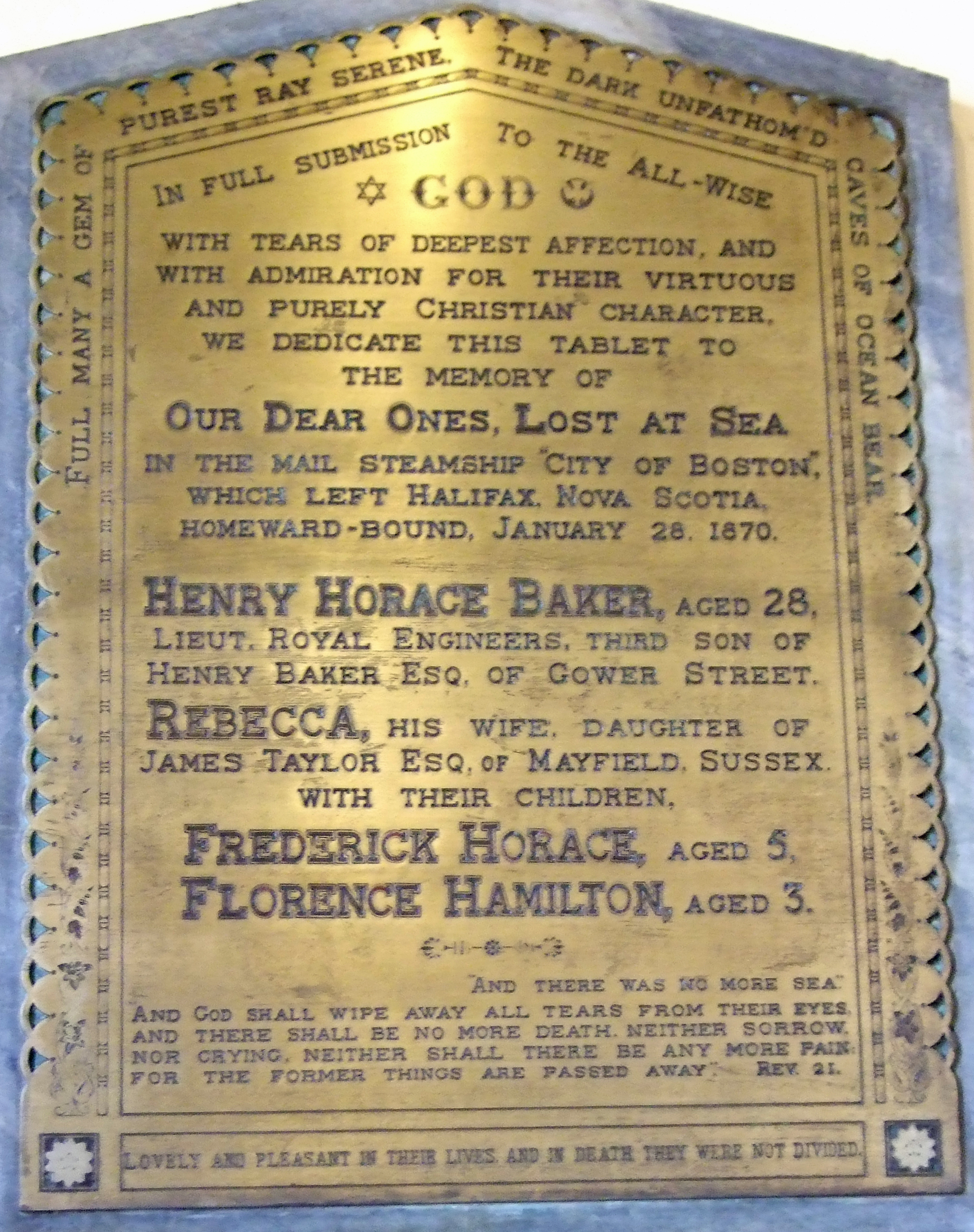
Memorial to a family lost in the disaster in the porch of St Pancras Parish Church, London.

The SS City of Boston was a British iron-hulled single-screw passenger steamship of the Inman Line which disappeared in the North Atlantic Ocean en route from Halifax, Nova Scotia, to Liverpool in January 1870.

== Description ==
The City of Boston was built by shipbuilders Tod & Macgregor of Partick, Glasgow and launched on 15 November 1864. Her maiden voyage, on 8 February 1865, was from Liverpool to New York via Queenstown.

== History ==
On 5 November 1868, she rescued the passengers and crew of Wabeno or Wahens, which had struck an iceberg in the Atlantic Ocean and was sinking. According to Henry Jenner, the City of Boston herself ran aground after leaving New York on 5 December 1868. The New York Herald refers to storms in New York on 5 November 1868, but makes no reference to a grounding.

=== Disappearance ===
The City of Boston sailed from Halifax, Nova Scotia for Liverpool on 28 January 1870 commanded by Captain Halcrow on her regular New York - Halifax - Liverpool route. She had 191 people on board: 55 cabin passengers, 52 steerage passengers and a crew of 84. (Other sources say 207 were aboard.) A number of the passengers were prominent businessmen and military officers from Halifax. She never reached her destination and no trace of her was ever found.

A violent gale and snowstorm took place two days after her departure which may have contributed to her loss. Collision with an iceberg was another explanation suggested at the time. It was reported at the time that she had been seen off the coast of Ireland on 25 February and had reported that both cylinders in her engine were broken. The barque Russell reported wreckage sunk 32 nautical miles (59 km) south west by south of the Smalls Lighthouse, with just a steamship's funnel out of the water. It was thought that this was from City of Boston. A piece of wood washed up at Perranporth, Cornwall on 25 April with the inscription "City of Boston is sinking. February 11th". A message in a bottle washed up at Cranstock, Cornwall in November 1870. The bottle had evidently been in the water for many months. The message claimed City of Boston had been in a collision with another vessel and was sinking. A message was found in a stone bottle at Waterloo on 6 May, dated 4 February, stating that the ship was on fire and the propellers broken. The signers were not listed as either crew or passengers. Another letter was found in a bottle on 19 April at Princes Bay, Staten Island, dated 2 March, stating that the engine room had caught fire and that the ship was swamped while trying to launch the lifeboat. The letter was signed with the probable name of one of the steerage passengers.

A statement was also published in the Times, that when she left, she was overladen, by 18 to 20 inches.

City of Boston had been fitted with a two-blade propeller to replace her original three-blade propeller which had been broken during her previous voyage, and Captain Brooks of the SS City of Brooklyn expressed the opinion that the new propeller would not be strong enough to let her make headway against the adverse weather.

In 1875, speculation emerged that a time bomb connected to an insurance fraud had been responsible for the ship's loss. A bomb exploded in a barrel being loaded onto a ship in Bremerhaven that year and killed 80 people. The bomb was planted by Alexander Keith, Jr., who lived on Halifax, Nova Scotia (the City of Boston's last port of call). However, no evidence emerged to connect Keith with the loss of the SS City of Boston.

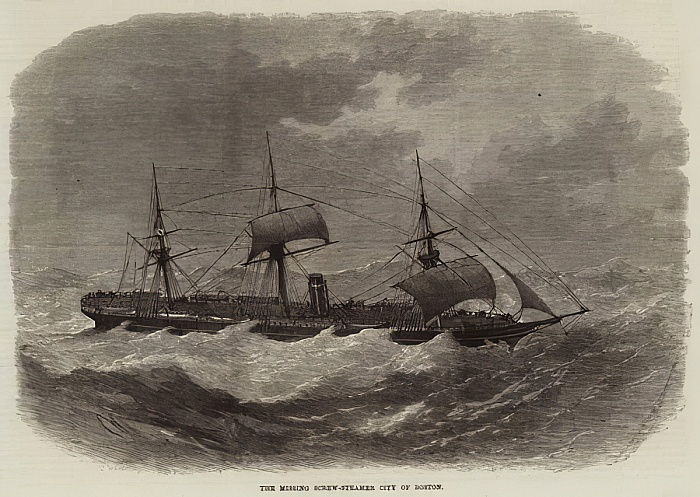
The Missing Screw-Steamer City of Boston, by Edwin Weedon

== See also ==
- List of shipwrecks
- List of United Kingdom disasters by death toll

== Sources ==
- Ann Larabee The Dynamite Fiend: The Chilling Tale of A Confederate Spy, Con Artist, and Mass Murderer (New York: Palgrave Macmillan, 2005), illus. p. 106, 144, 167, 177, 182. ISBN 1-4039-6794-6.
