= SS City of Berlin =

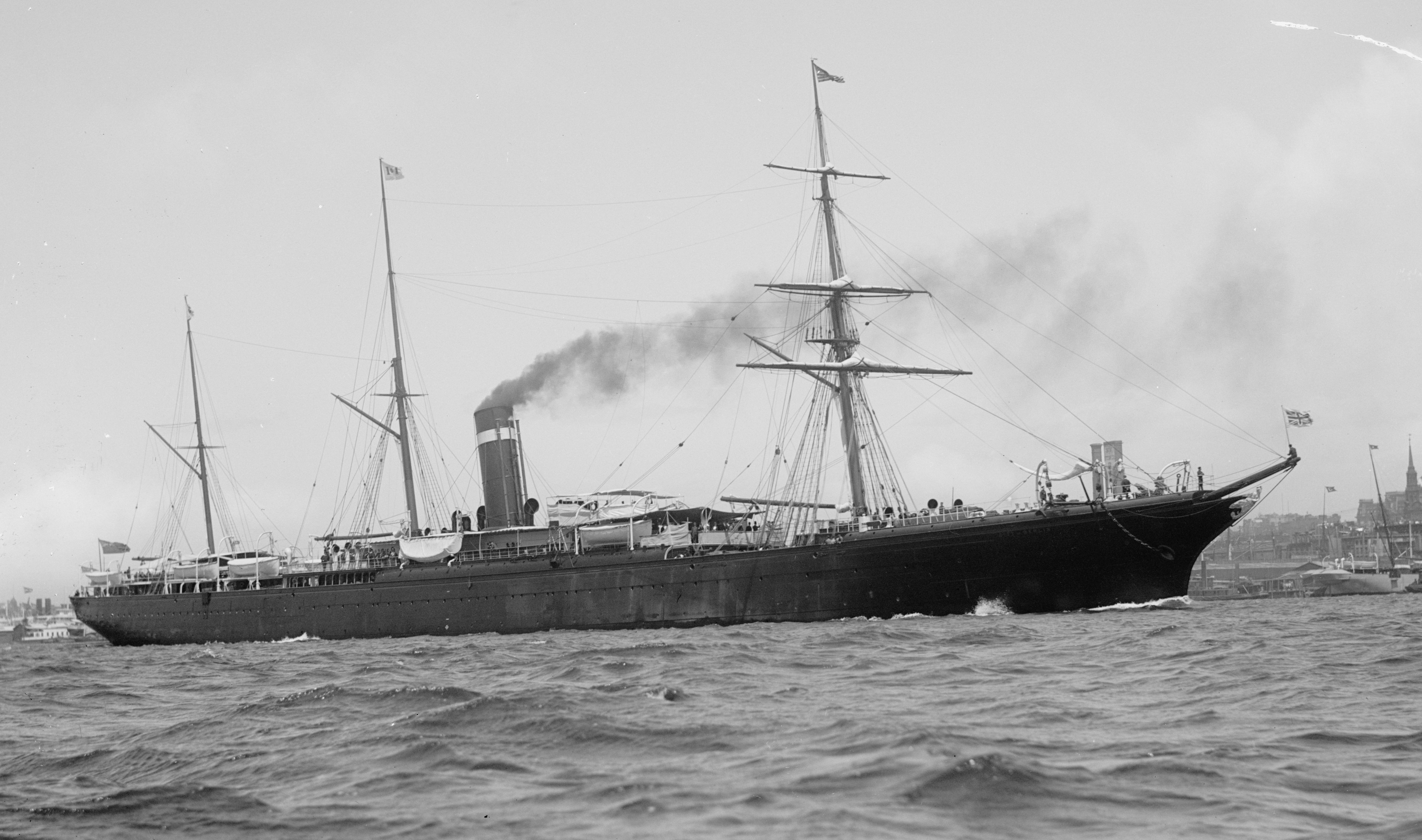
- Inman's City of Berlin

History

United Kingdom
- Name: City of Berlin
- Namesake: Berlin
- Owner: Inman Line
- Port of registry: Liverpool, United Kingdom
- Route: Atlantic crossing.
- Builder: Caird & Company, Greenock, Scotland
- Launched: 27 October 1874
- Maiden voyage: 29 April 1875
- Honors and awards: Blue Riband winner
- Fate: Sold 1898, scrapped 1921

General characteristics
- Type: Ocean Liner, single funnel
- Tonnage: 5491 tons
- Length: 488.6 ft (148.9 m)
- Beam: 44.2 ft (13.5 m)
- Installed power: Steam
- Propulsion: Single screw
- Sail plan: 3 masts
- Speed: 15 knots
- Notes: later names: SS Berlin (1893), SS Meade (1898)

City of Berlin was a British ocean liner that won the Blue Riband for the Inman Line in 1875 as the fastest liner on the Atlantic. She was also the largest active passenger ship for six years except for the inactive Great Eastern Built by Caird & Company in Scotland, City of Berlin was the Inman Line's premier unit for thirteen years until City of New York was commissioned in 1888. She served the Inman Line until 1893 when Inman was merged into the American Line, and she was operated by her new owners on both the American Line and Red Star Line until 1898. She was sold to the U.S. Government, and was in their service until after World War I.

== Development and design ==
When Inman learned of White Star's plans to build two larger and faster editions of the Oceanic, Inman's fleet on the competing weekly Liverpool–New York service consisted of four liners with service speeds of 13.5 knots and the recently completed SS City of Montreal, which while large, had a service speed of only 12 knots. Inman decided to replace City of Montreal in the express service with a new liner specifically designed to better White Star's new Britannic Class liners. The completion of the City of Berlin in 1875 finally gave the Inman Line the five fast express liners needed for a balanced year-round weekly service.

Larger than the White Star liners, City of Berlin carried 202 first class and 1,500 steerage passengers. She had a ratio of length to beam of 11:1, making her the longest "long boat" built for the Atlantic. Her two-cylinder compound steam engine was rated at 4800 indicated horsepower giving her a normal service speed of 15 knots. Because her speed and fuel consumption were disappointing during trials, machinery improvements were required before the ship was commissioned.

== Service history ==
In September 1875, City of Berlin won the Blue Riband from Britannic's sister, Germanic with a Queenstown–New York passage of 7 days, 18 hours, 2 minutes (15.21 knots). Two years later, she suffered shaft trouble on two voyages, arriving in tow, once by the National Line's Egypt and the second behind Inman's City of New York. In 1879, she became the first North Atlantic liner to be fitted with electric lighting, when six incandescent lamps where shared between the dining salon, boiler rooms and engine rooms. On 29 October 1883, she collided with HMS Hawk 47 nautical miles (87 km) north east of the Tuskar Rock. City of Berlin was undamaged. Her high coal consumption of 120 tons a day was reduced in 1887 when she was re-engined with triple expansion.

City of Berlin retained her British registration after Inman was merged into the American Line, but her name was reduced to Berlin. In 1895, she and the City of Chester were replaced in the American Line's weekly mail fleet by the new express liners, the St Louis and the St Paul. Berlin was placed on the Antwerp–New York route for the Red Star Line with occasional sailings for the American Line.

In 1898, Berlin was sold to the U.S. Government for the Spanish–American War, and was renamed Meade. She trooped to the Philippines until she was seriously damaged by a fire in San Francisco on 31 January 1906. Repaired, she continued service through World War I and was finally scrapped in 1921.

Records
Preceded by Germanic	Holder of the Blue Riband (Westbound record); 1875	Succeeded by Britannic
Preceded by Baltic	Blue Riband (Eastbound record); 1875	Succeeded by Germanic
