= Gülcemal =

Gülcemal is a Turkish name meaning "rose faced", and may refer to:

- Gülcemal Kadın (c. 1826–1851), a wife of Ottoman Sultan Abdülmecid I
- Gul Djemal (Ottoman ship), Ottoman passenger ship, ex SS Germanic (1874)
- Gülcemal (Turkish ship), Turkish passenger ship, ex Gul Djemal (Ottoman ship)
