= SS Baltic (1871) =

Ocean liner

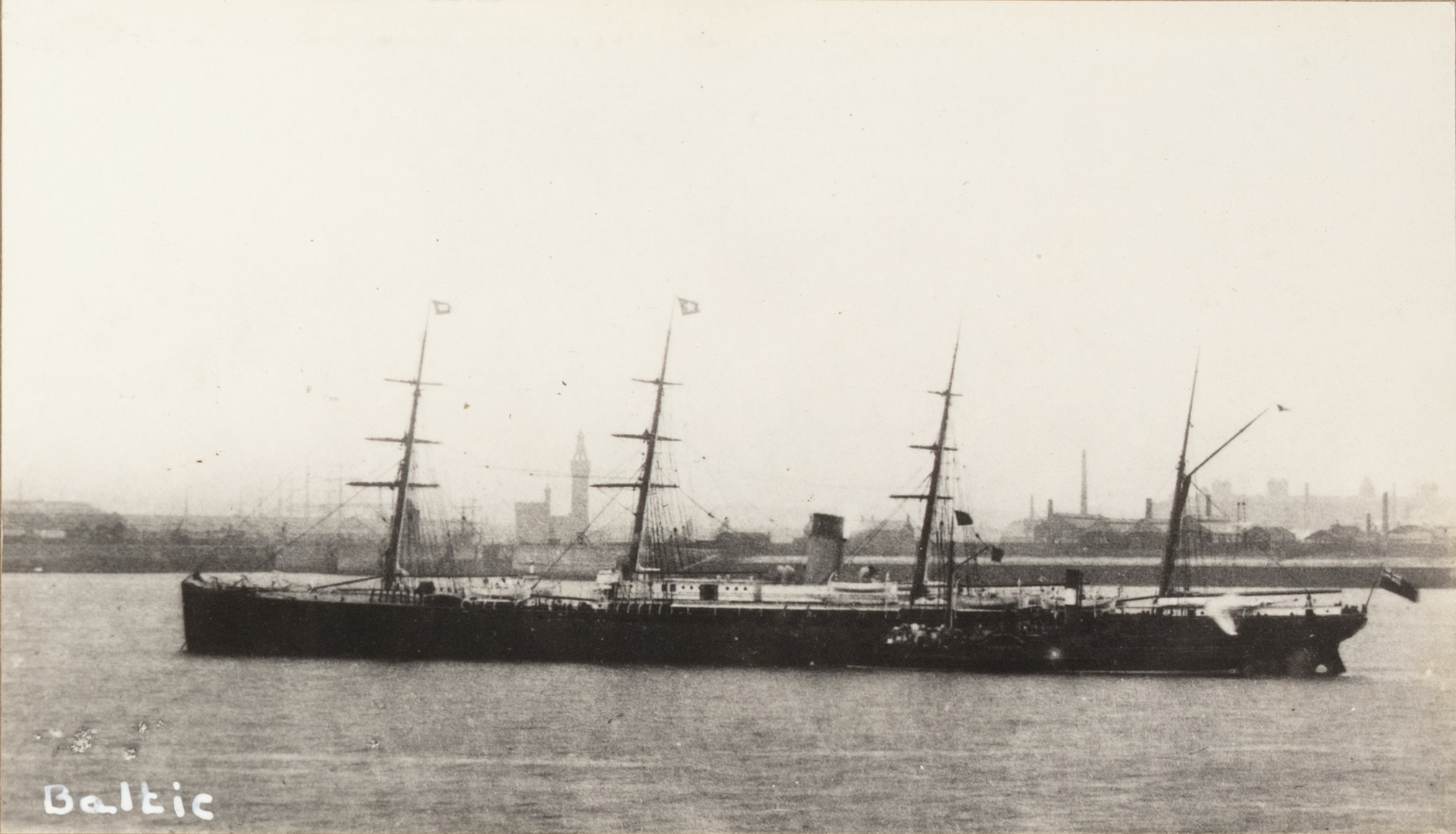
- SS Baltic

History
- Name: 1871: Pacific; 1871: Baltic; 1888: Veendam
- Namesake: 1871: Baltic Sea; 1888: Veendam
- Owner: 1871: White Star Line; 1888: Holland America Line
- Port of registry: 1871: (United Kingdom) Liverpool; 1888: (Netherlands) Rotterdam
- Builder: Harland & Wolff, Belfast
- Yard number: 75
- Laid down: 1870
- Launched: 8 March 1871
- Completed: 2 September 1871
- Maiden voyage: 14 September 1871
- In service: 1871–1898
- Fate: Sunk in collision 6 February 1898

General characteristics
- Class & type: Oceanic-class ocean liner
- Tonnage: 3,888 GRT; 2,458 NRT
- Length: 452 ft (138 m); 437.2 ft (133.3 m)
- Beam: 40.9 ft (12.5 m)
- Depth: 31.0 ft (9.4 m)
- Decks: 2
- Installed power: 600 hp
- Propulsion: 2 × 2-cylinder compound engines; 12 boilers, single propeller
- Sail plan: 4-masted barque
- Speed: 14.5 knots (26.9 km/h; 16.7 mph)
- Capacity: 850 passengers

SS Baltic was an Oceanic-class ocean liner that was built in 1871 for the White Star Line. She was one of the first four ships ordered by White Star from shipbuilders Harland & Wolff after Thomas Ismay bought the company, and the third ship of the Oceanic class to be delivered. In 1888 Holland America Line bought her, and renamed her Veendam. In 1898 she struck a submerged wreck and sank, but with no loss of life.

== Name ==
Originally the ship was to be named Pacific, and was launched under this name. This was changed to Baltic during her fitting out so as to avoid association with the Collins Line steamship Pacific, which had vanished with all hands in January 1856.

== Features ==
Baltic was largely identical in design to her three Oceanic-class sister ships, a general outline of her characteristics can be found at Oceanic-class_ocean_liner#Features.

Baltic was an improved version of her first sister ship Oceanic, in that her engines, built by Maudslay, Sons & Field were of an improved design, and she had improved passenger accommodation.

== Career ==
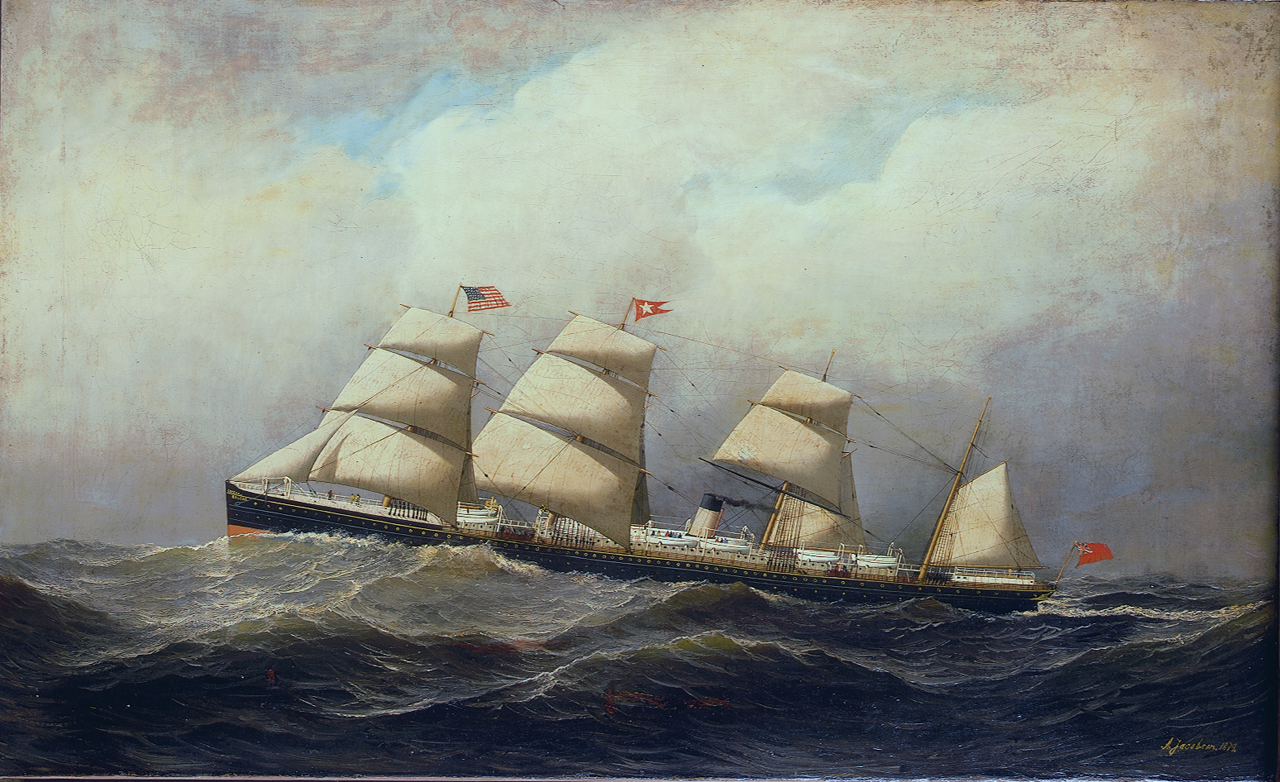
Painting of Baltic by Antonio Jacobsen

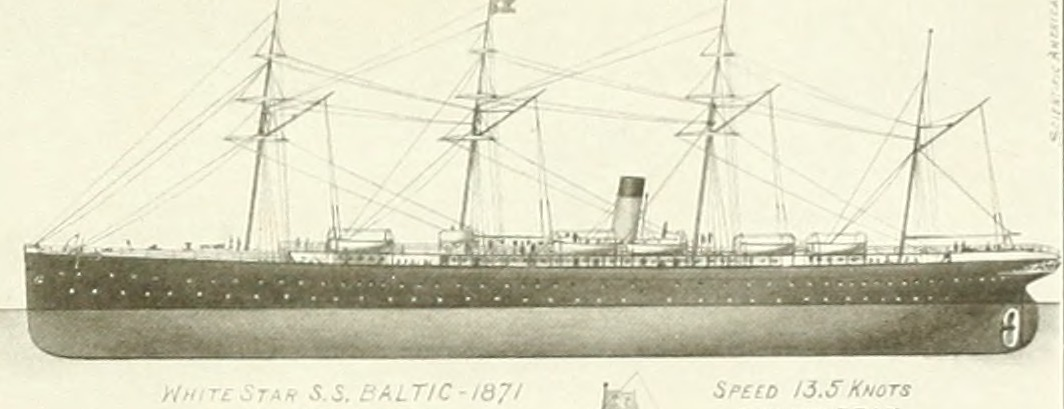
Postcard of Baltic

She made her maiden voyage on the Liverpool – Queenstown – New York route in September 1871, On 17 October 1871, Baltic ran aground on the Jordan Flats, in Liverpool Bay whilst on a voyage from New York to Liverpool, Lancashire. Her passengers were taken off. She was refloated and taken in to Birkenhead, Cheshire. On 20 November 1872, Baltic rescued the crew of Assyria.

In January 1873, she captured the much sought after eastbound Blue Riband achieving a timing of 7 days, 20 hours, 9 minutes, from New York to Queenstown, achieving an average speed of 15.09 knots (27.95 km/h; 17.37 mph).

On 19 November 1875, Baltic rescued the crew of the full-rigged ship Oriental, which had become waterlogged in the Atlantic Ocean. On 17 August 1880, the steamship Longford collided with her in the River Mersey and sank.

Baltic served White Star on the North Atlantic run for 17 years, except for two brief periods in 1883, and 1885 when she was chartered to the Inman Line. In 1888, Baltic was sold to the Holland America Line and renamed Veendam, after the town of Veendam in the province of Groningen. In 1890, she was fitted with new engines. On 6 February 1898, Veendam hit a submerged shipwreck and sank, with no loss of life.

== See also ==
- RMS Baltic (1903) – later namesake of White Star Line

Records
Preceded by City of Brussels	Blue Riband (Eastbound record); 1873–1875	Succeeded by City of Berlin
