= SS City of Rome =

British Ship

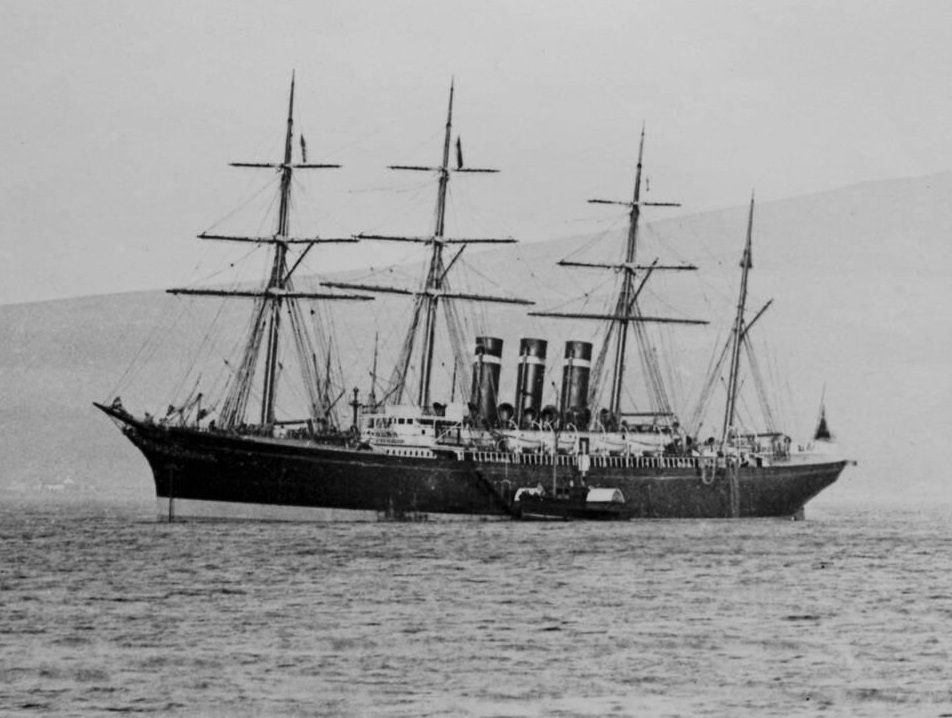
- City of Rome

History

United Kingdom
- Name: City of Rome
- Owner: Inman Line (1881)
- Operator: Anchor Line (1881–1900)
- Port of registry: (United Kingdom) Barrow-in-Furness
- Route: trans-Atlantic (1881)
- Builder: Barrow Ship Building Co
- Launched: 14 June 1881
- Commissioned: 1881
- Maiden voyage: 13 October 1881
- Fate: Scrapped 1902

General characteristics
- Type: Ocean liner
- Tonnage: 8,453 GRT; tonnage under deck 6,144; 7,468 NRT
- Length: 560.2 ft (170.7 m)
- Beam: 52.3 ft (15.9 m)
- Depth: 37.0 ft (11.3 m)
- Installed power: 1,500 NHP
- Propulsion: 3 × 2-cylinder compound inverted steam engines
- Sail plan: 4-masted; barque, then schooner
- Speed: 1881: 15.75 knots (29.17 km/h); 1883: 18.25 knots (33.80 km/h)
- Capacity: passengers, 1881: 520 First Class, 810 Steerage Class; passengers, 1891: 75 First Class, 250 Second Class, 1,000 Steerage Class; cargo: 2,200 tons

City of Rome was a British ocean liner, built by the Barrow Ship Building Company for the Inman Line to be the largest and fastest liner on the North Atlantic route. Though not achieving the requested specifications due to design compromise, and so returned to Barrow-in-Furness after only six voyages, The Anchor Line managed her on various routes until 1900. She was scrapped in 1902.

== Development and design ==
The completion of the Guion Line's Arizona in 1879 forced all major trans-Atlantic companies to consider building new high-speed passenger liners. Designed by William John, who later would design the United States Navy's first battleship, the USS Texas, City of Rome was Inman's answer. She was a much larger ship designed to cross the Atlantic at 18 knots (33 km/h). City of Rome carried 520 first class passengers in quarters of especially high quality, as well as 810 in the inexpensive steerage class. She was one of the first liners to be lighted entirely by electricity.

The contract specified a steel hull, but Barrows convinced Inman to accept iron due to the difficulties in securing sufficient supplies of the then relatively new metal. Unfortunately, because of this and also inadequate calculations resulting from the change of material, City of Rome's draught was too great.

Twin screws were at first considered but ultimately rejected. Her boilers supplied steam at 90 lb_{f}/in^{2} to three inverted two-cylinder compound steam engines to drive her single screw. These produced a total of 1,500 Nominal Horsepower, which was only 75% of her intended power. She was completed in June 1881.

Being under-powered, too heavy and drawing too much water, City of Rome reached only 15.75 knots (29.17 km/h) on sea trial. Also, her cargo capacity was only 2,200 tons, instead of the 3,800 tons originally specified.

== Service history ==
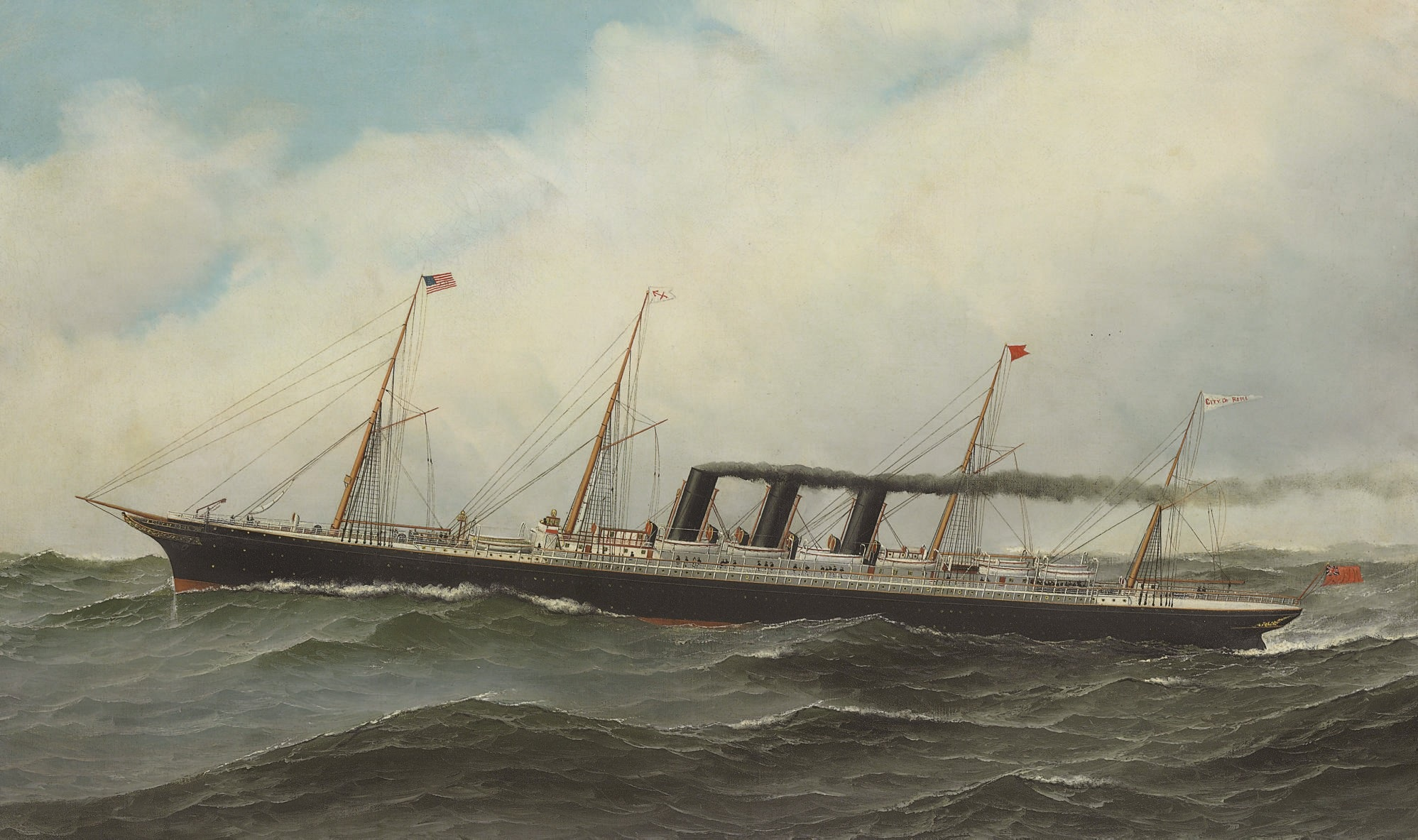
SS City of Rome by Antonio Jacobsen

In August 1882, Inman rejected City of Rome after just six cross-Atlantic voyages because of her under-performance. Barrows lost in the lengthy court case that followed. The Anchor Line was associated with Barrows, and it was now contracted to manage its white elephant. Barrows modified her machinery and reduced her weight, and City of Rome was able to reach an impressive 18.25 knots (33.80 km/h) on new trials. Starting in May 1883, Anchor assigned her on the Liverpool – New York route, where she proved comfortable and popular. Nevertheless, she was still unprofitable because she lacked a suitable consort. Anchor made attempts to overcome this, including pairing her with the National Line's America in 1886, but none of them proved satisfactory.

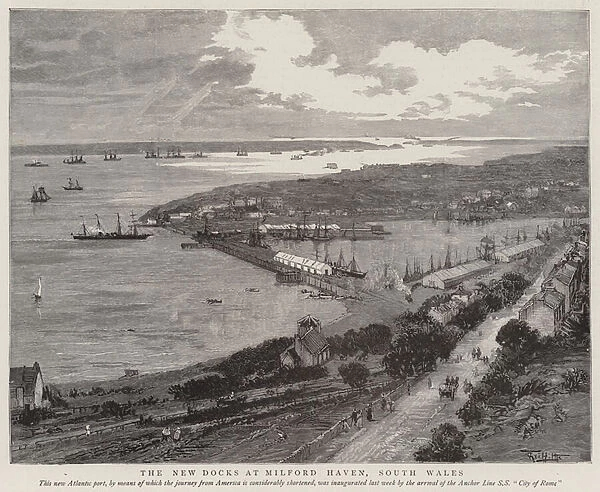
The New Docks at Milford Haven, was inaugurated by the arrival of the City of Rome. The Graphic 1889

In 1891 City of Rome was withdrawn from Liverpool and placed on the Glasgow – New York route, paired with vessels only half her size. Her passenger accommodation was changed to just 75 in first class, 250 in second class, and now 1,000 in steerage. In September 1898, after the conclusion of the Spanish–American War, the United States government chartered City of Rome to repatriate Spanish Navy prisoners of war. The following year, she suffered damaged in a collision with an iceberg. In 1900, she served Britain as a troopship during the Second Boer War. Later that year, she was sold to a German scrap firm, but instead returned to transatlantic duty for a short time on the Glasgow – Moville – New York route. By now the liner was obviously reaching the end of her service. One voyage took eleven days. She left Glasgow on Thursday 27 September 1900 and did not reach New York until Monday 8 October 1900. En route she had suffered two mechanical breakdowns. The first (a blown cylinder head) occurred on Sunday 30 September, taking 14 hours to repair. The second took place three days later, and for four hours the ship was tossed about in very heavy seas. By 1902 the decision had been made to break her up for scrap. She arrived in Lemwerder, Germany in January 1903 for breaking up.

== The ship's automaton ==
In March 2010, an automaton from City of Rome made the news when it was auctioned in New Zealand, where it been in a private collection of automata. In the 1920s it had been featured in the London Mechanical and Electrical Exhibition, an exhibition that travelled across England, Europe, Australia, and New Zealand. It is thought to have been made in the 1880s as an advertising piece to attract passengers. The automaton features a ship sailing before a revolving pulley-driven backdrop, with waves visible below it, and a hot air balloon floating overhead. Needing repair to the masts and rigging, the automaton sold for NZ$7,000.
