= SS Germanic (1874) =

British transatlantic ocean liner

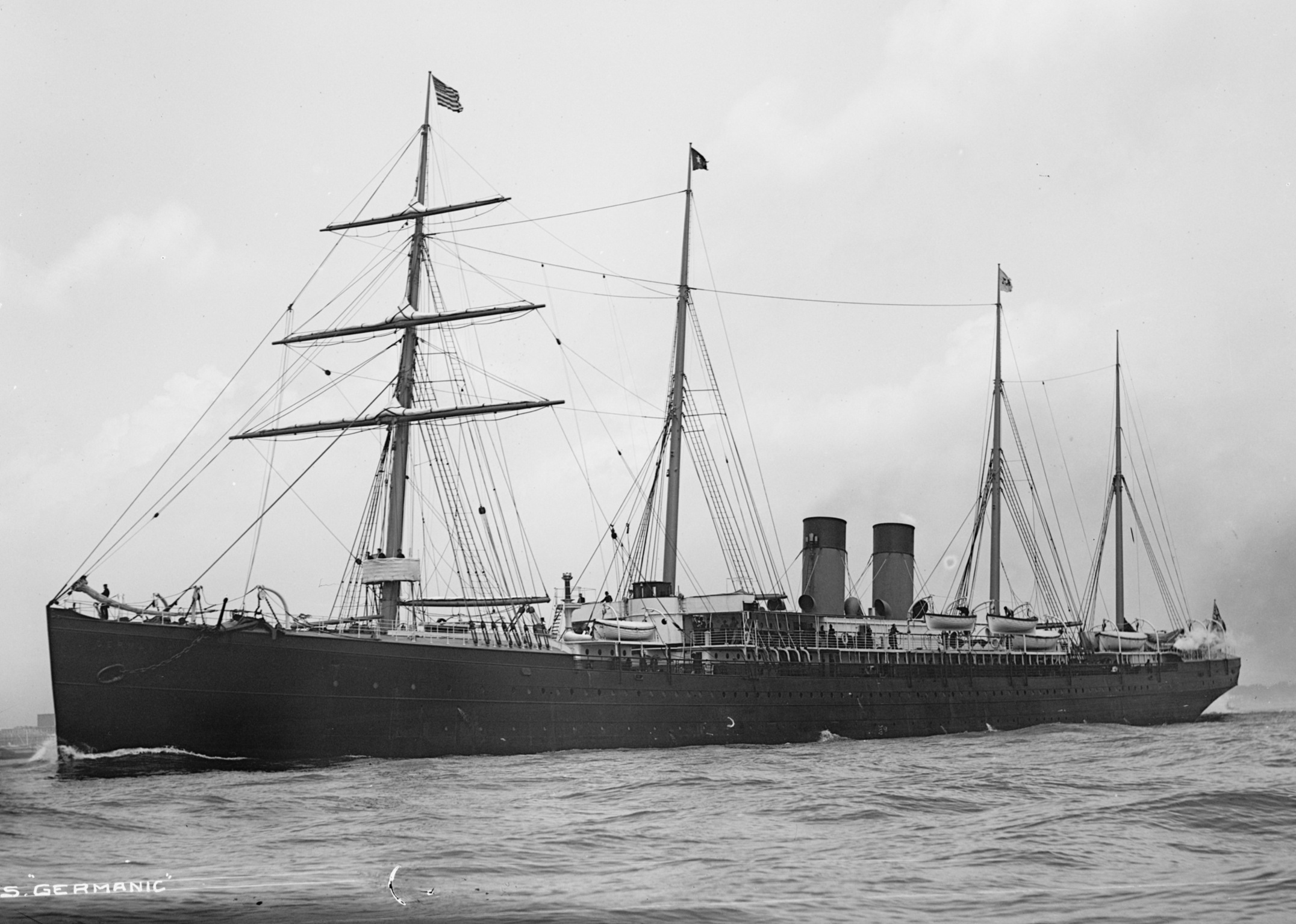
- Germanic between 1890 and 1895

History

United Kingdom
- Name: Germanic (1874–1905); Ottawa (1905–1910)
- Operator: White Star Line (1874–1904); American Line (1904–1905); Dominion Line (1905–1910)
- Port of registry: Liverpool
- Builder: Harland and Wolff, Belfast, UK
- Yard number: 85
- Laid down: October 1872
- Launched: 15 July 1874
- Completed: 24 April 1875
- In service: 20 May 1875
- Out of service: 1910
- Fate: Sold to Ottoman Empire, 1910

Turkey
- Name: Gul Djemal (1910–1928); Gülcemal (1928–1950)
- Owner: Administration de Navigation à Vapeur Ottomane (1910–1928); Türkiye Seyr-i Sefain İdaresi(1928–1950)
- In service: 1910
- Out of service: 1950
- Fate: Scrapped, 1950

General characteristics
- Class & type: Britannic-class ocean liner
- Type: Ocean liner
- Tonnage: 5,008 GRT
- Length: 455 ft (139 m)
- Beam: 45 ft 2 in (13.77 m)
- Propulsion: As built; 8 × boilers; 2 × 2-cylinder compound steam engines; 1 screw propeller; From 1895; Triple-expansion steam engines
- Speed: 16 knots (30 km/h; 18 mph)
- Capacity: 1,720 passengers: 220 × 1st class; 1500 × 3rd class

SS Germanic was an ocean liner built by Harland and Wolff in 1874 and operated by the White Star Line. She was the sister ship of Britannic, serving with the White Star Line until 1904. She later operated under the name Ottawa until 1910. After passing into Turkish ownership she operated under the name Gülcemal (English: rose-faced Latinized as Gül Djemal before adoption of Latin-based script) and gained great popularity until she was broken up in 1950 after a total career of 75 years.

== Design and construction ==
In her original design, Germanic was nearly identical to her earlier sister Britannic, and details about the technical features and facilities of the two ships can be found on the Britannic article. Germanic was originally intended to be fitted with the same experimental adjustable propeller system as her sister, however as this proved to be unsuccessful in service on her sister, it was removed during construction, and Germanic was instead fitted with a conventional fixed propeller arrangement. Germanic was built at Harland and Wolff, Belfast and was launched on 15 July 1874. Although fitting out was completed in early 1875, delivery was delayed until May of that year so that she would arrive in time for the summer transatlantic season. She was primarily steam powered, but was equipped with auxiliary sails. Germanic was the last iron-hulled ship built for the White Star Line as all their future ships used steel.

== Career ==
=== Germanic ===
She departed on her maiden voyage on 20 May 1875 from Liverpool to New York, arriving ten days later. In doing so, she replaced Oceanic, the White Star's first post-Ismay steamship that was placed on charter by the company in the same year.

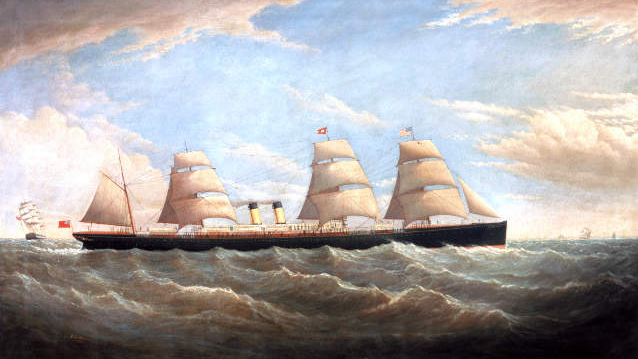
Germanic in 1876 by Joseph Witham

In February 1876 Germanic made a record eastbound crossing, sailing from New York to Queenstown in 7 days, 15 hours and 17 minutes at an average speed of 15.81 knots (29.28 km/h; 18.19 mph), and winning the much coveted record which would become known as the Blue Riband from the Inman Line's City of Berlin. In April 1877 she broke the westbound record, crossing from Queenstown to New York in 7 days 11 hours and 37 minutes, averaging 15.76 knots (29.19 km/h; 18.14 mph). Meaning that Germanic and Britannic (which had also set records) were recognised as among the finest liners on the Atlantic.

On 7 November 1880, she collided with Samarang off Sandy Hook, New Jersey, United States whilst on a voyage from Liverpool to New York. Germanic was undamaged and resumed her voyage. Samarang had to be beached. In January 1883 whilst on an eastbound crossing, Germanic's propeller shaft sheared at sea, and she was forced to make the rest of the journey by sail. In April 1885, Germanic encountered a severe storm whilst on a westbound crossing with 850 passengers on board. When she was around 500 miles (800 km) west of Ireland, an exceptionally large wave broke over the ship causing substantial damage, with several lifeboats torn away, the skylights to her engine rooms smashed, and her pilot house being stove in. Water flooded into the boiler and engine rooms, a hole was torn into the side of the reading room, which was flooded, along with the saloon and staterooms, and 13 people were injured, with one sailor being washed overboard. The captain decided that it would be unsafe to continue the journey, and so the ship was turned around and returned to port in order for the ship to be repaired. This was the first recorded incident where a White Star ship had to abort a journey due to a weather related incident. On 14 January 1886, she was driven ashore at Egremont, Lancashire. She was refloated and taken in to Birkenhead, Cheshire for examination.

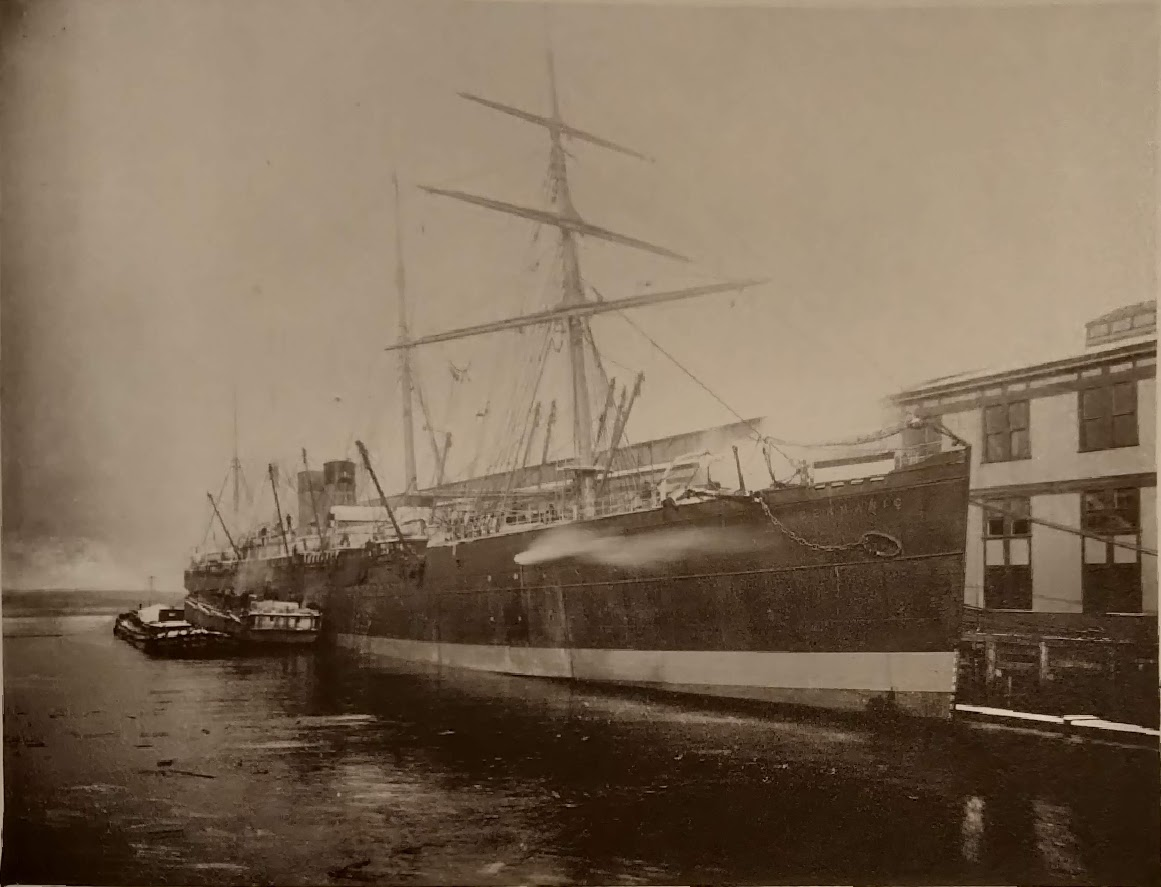
Germanic docked at New York c. 1890

In 1895, after twenty years of service, Germanic was withdrawn from service and returned to her builders to undergo a major refit, in order to modernise the ship and extend her service life: New higher pressure boilers were fitted, and her original compound engines were replaced by more modern triple expansion engines made by Harland & Wolff. New funnels were fitted which were taller than the originals, most of her rigging was removed, and her superstructure was enlarged by the addition of an extra deck. Her interiors were also extensively remodelled. Germanic's gross tonnage was increased to 5,066 tons by the refit, and she returned to regular service on 15 May that year under the command of Edward Smith, becoming the first vessel to embark passengers at Liverpool's new floating landing stage. The new engines improved Germanic's speed; her first voyage using them shaved several hours off her previous record. Being more efficient, they also reduced coal consumption.

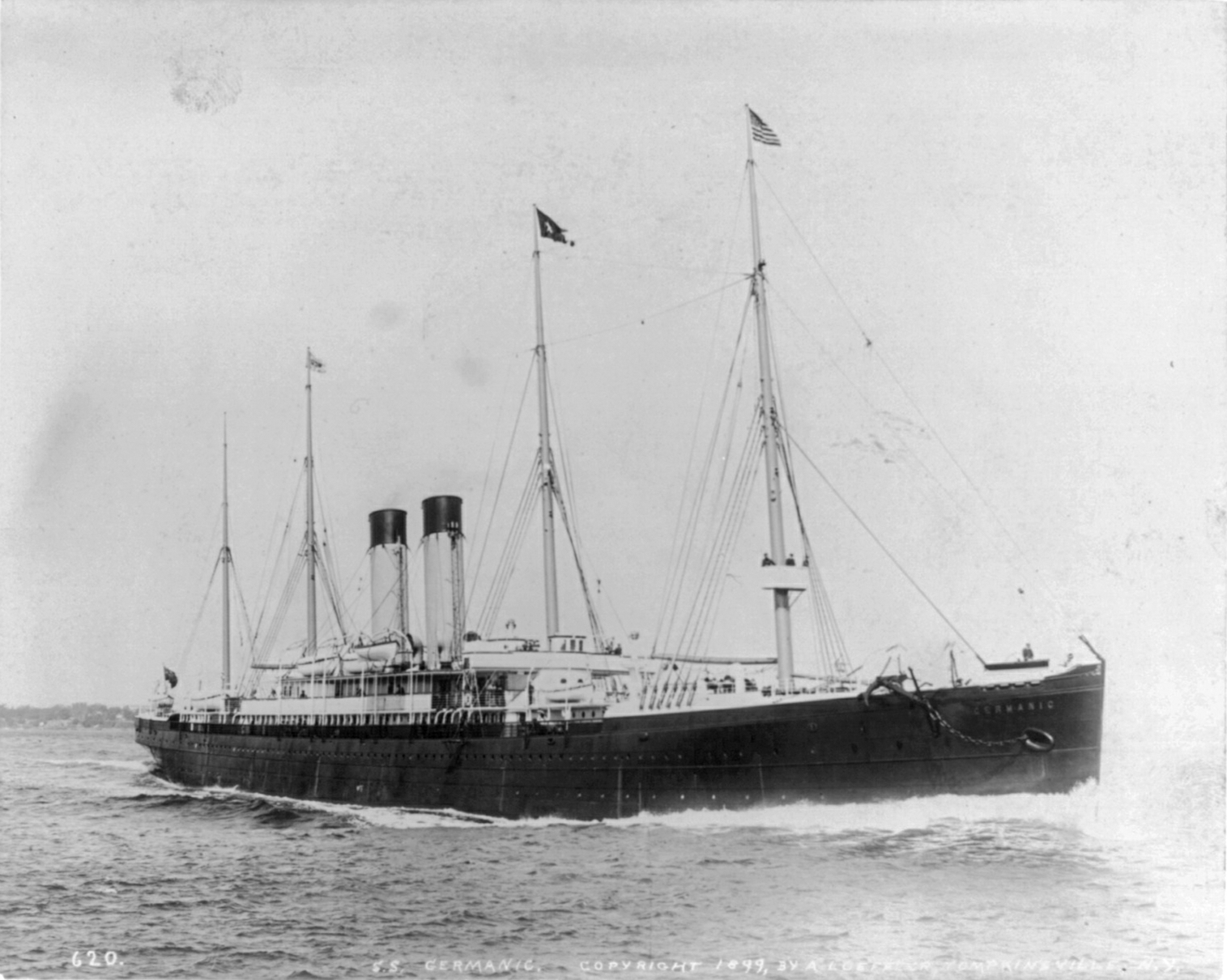
Germanic following her 1895 refit. Note the taller funnels, extra deck and lack of rigging

On 11 December 1895, Germanic left Liverpool for New York in dense fog; shortly after leaving the mouth of the River Mersey she collided with the 900-ton Glasgow registered steamship Cumbrae, with Germanic's bow penetrating 14 feet (4.3 m) into the side of the smaller ship. Germanic's captain kept the ship moving forward at dead slow, in order to keep the vessels locked together, so that the Cumbrae's 28 passengers and crew would have time to scramble aboard Germanic for safety. When the two vessels were parted, the Cumbrae rapidly sank. Germanic's bow was badly damaged, and she immediately returned to port, and was withdrawn from service for repairs. She re-entered service in January 1896.

On 11 February 1899, Germanic arrived at New York with her upper decks and rigging laden with ice and snow after sailing through a blizzard, which gave the ship a list to starboard. The crew chipped away enough of the ice to allow the ship to dock and the passengers to disembark, however on 13 February 1899, while being refuelled with coal at White Star's New York City pier, another heavy blizzard added an even heavier layer of ice and snow, which added an estimated 1,800 tons to her topweight. Now top heavy, and aided by strong winds, she listed to port, so much so that water began to enter doors opened for coaling. Germanic sank and settled upright on to the shallow harbour bottom. She was pumped out and raised by salvage teams; an operation which took just over a week. The ship had sustained water damage to her accommodation but was otherwise undamaged, and was determined to be worth saving, so she returned to Belfast for a refurbishment that lasted three months. The salvage and refurbishment cost White Star £40,000, (equivalent to £4,440,000 in 2025), an enormous sum for the time.

On 23 September 1903, Germanic left on her final run as a White Star liner after 28 years of service. She was then laid up for the winter, and in 1904 she was transferred to the American Line, one of White Star's sister companies within the International Mercantile Marine Co. (IMMCo), the holding group which White Star had been bought by in 1902. Still named Germanic, she served on the Southampton to New York route, with her first voyage starting on 23 April 1904, she completed only six round trips on this route, before being transferred yet again in October that year to another IMM company, the Dominion Line, to be used on that company's Canadian service, and her passenger accommodation was converted to carry 250 second class, and 1,500 third class passengers.

=== Ottawa ===
On 5 January 1905, Germanic was renamed Ottawa. For the next four years, Ottawa served on the Canadian route, alternating between the Liverpool to Halifax route during the winter months, and Liverpool to Quebec City and Montreal during the summer season, when the St. Lawrence River was ice free. In 1909, Ottawa joined four other liners to ensure a weekly joint White Star-Dominion Line service between Liverpool and the Canadian ports. After the 1909 summer season, Ottawa was laid up for winter.

=== Gul Djemal / Gülcemal ===
In 1910, the Government of the Ottoman Empire bought the ship from IMM for £20,000 (equivalent to £2,040,000 in 2025), to be used as a troop transport, as part of a five-ship transport fleet. She left Liverpool for the last time on 15 March 1911 for Constantinople, and was renamed Gul Djemal, in honour of the Sultan's mother. She was operated as part of the Ottoman Navy by the Administration de Navigation à Vapeur Ottomane (Ottoman Steamship Administration) of Istanbul. Within a few months, she was carrying Turkish soldiers to war duty in Yemen at the southern extremity of the Ottoman Empire in order to quell an uprising. In 1912 she was transferred to the Black Sea. She was also used to transport thousands of Muslim pilgrims to Jeddah, the nearest port to Mecca, for the annual Hajj pilgrimage.

When World War I began and the Ottoman Empire joined forces with Germany, she again became a troop ship, ferrying soldiers to the Gallipoli Peninsula for the Gallipoli campaign. On 3 May 1915, Gul Djemal was on this run, with a full complement of 1,600 soldiers, when she was torpedoed by the British submarine HMS E14. The ship was damaged but did not sink, and was assisted back to Istanbul, where her bow was found to be broken through. British sources incorrectly claimed that the ship was sunk with great loss of life.

Gul Djemal was repaired with German assistance and put back into service, at first as a naval auxiliary in the Black Sea. In November 1918, she was used to repatriate 1,500 German troops from Turkey after the Armistice. She turned up unannounced to the Allied control point at Dover, which caused alarm and confusion, however the German soldiers were disarmed and sent home. In 1919 the ship embarked returning German troops of General Kress's Caucasus expedition, and the remaining German residents of Constantinople, from there to Bremen, arriving 29 June 1919.

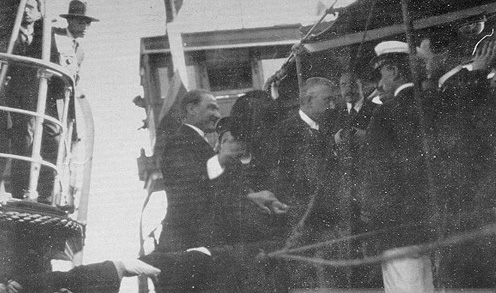
Turkish President Mustafa Kemal Atatürk boarding Gul Djemal in 1926.

After the collapse of the Ottoman Empire in 1920, Gul Djemal became a Turkish ship. In 1920, Gul Djemal went to work for the Ottoman American Line, and was put to work on a service from Istanbul to New York City, once again carrying immigrants across the Atlantic to America. She made her first journey on this route on 6 October 1920. This made history as being the first Turkish flagged ship to reach America. However, after only one year and four round trips, the service was terminated. She was later in service in the Black Sea. She was one of the ships responsible in transporting Turks from Crete, Greece to Turkey during the population exchange between Greece and Turkey after the Turkish War of Independence. After this mission she returned to regular services along the Turkish Black Sea coast between Istanbul and Trabzon.

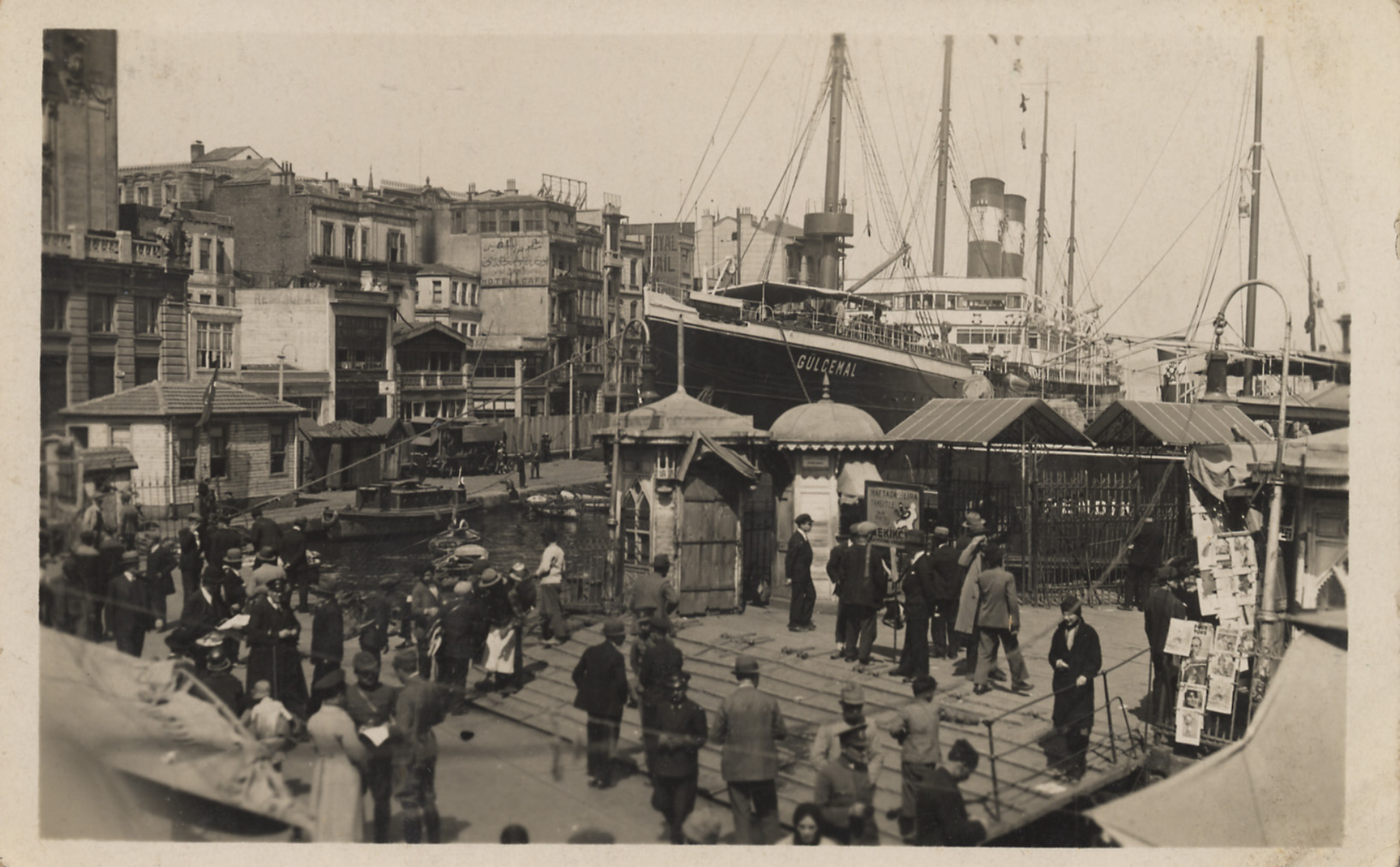
Gülcemal, in Karaköy, Istanbul. (Estimated photo date between 1928 and 1937)

The famed Turkish leader Mustafa Kemal Atatürk made several voyages on board the ship between 1926 and 1934.

In 1928, the ship was transferred to the Turkiye Seyrisefain Idaresi (Turkish Navigation Administration) and the spelling of her name amended to Gülcemal to comply with the new Turkish alphabet. In January 1931, she grounded in the Sea of Marmora, but was refloated and returned to service.

In 1937, Gülcemal, now 63 years old, was retired from regular service, and rarely left port after this date, by 1939 her voyages were few and far between. She survived World War II, although playing no notable part in it, and was last mentioned in the International Lloyd's records in 1945. By 1949, she was being used as a warehouse ship in the port. In 1950 it was rumored that she would be used briefly as a floating hotel, however on 29 October 1950, Gülcemal was taken from Istanbul under tow to Messina for scrapping, arriving on 16 November. The ship had lasted 75 years, surviving numerous major mishaps and two World Wars. When being demolished, her original White Star Line gold stripe could still be seen along her hull. Only Cunard's SS Parthia (1870) served a longer time afloat than Germanic, ending her days as a lumber tug in 1956. Parthia's record (84 years) as longest serving "floating palace", in any capacity, still holds today.

== See also ==
- List of White Star Line ships

Records
| Preceded by Adriatic | Holder of the Blue Riband (Westbound record); 1875 | Succeeded by City of Berlin |
| Preceded by City of Berlin | Blue Riband (Eastbound record); 1876 | Succeeded by Britannic |
| Preceded by Britannic | Blue Riband (Westbound record); 1877–1882 | Succeeded by Alaska |
