= SS City of Glasgow (1850) =

British passenger ship

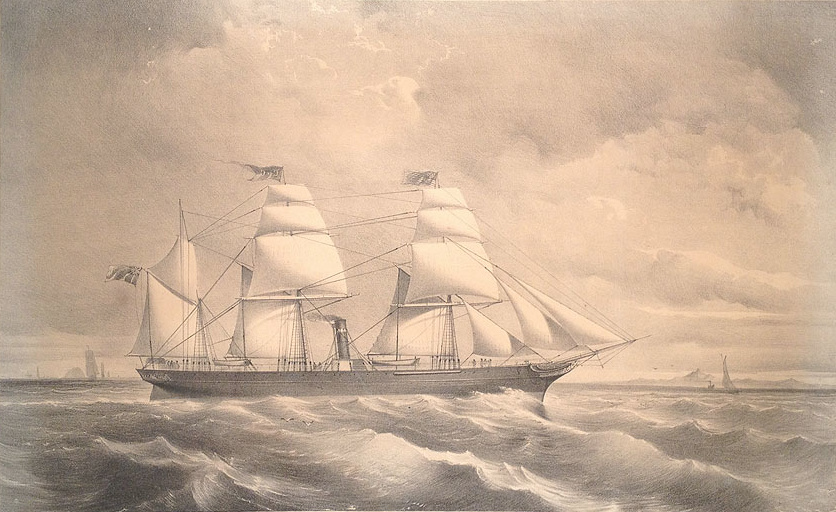
- City of Glasgow by Edward Duncan

History

United Kingdom
- Name: City of Glasgow
- Namesake: Glasgow
- Owner: 1850: Tod & Macgregor; 1850–54: Inman Line
- Port of registry: Glasgow
- Route: 1850 Glasgow – New York City; 1850–54 Liverpool – Philadelphia
- Ordered: 1849
- Builder: Tod & Macgregor, Partick, Glasgow
- Yard number: 57
- Launched: 28 February 1850
- Christened: 28 February 1850 by Miss M. Galbraith
- Completed: April 1850
- Maiden voyage: 16 April 1850
- Fate: Lost at sea March 1854

General characteristics
- Type: Ocean liner
- Tons burthen: 1,610 bm
- Length: 227.5 ft (69.3 m)
- Beam: 32.7 ft (10.0 m)
- Depth: 24.7 ft (7.5 m)
- Propulsion: 2-cylinder beam engine; single screw
- Sail plan: 3-masted barque
- Capacity: 137 cabin passengers as built. 400 steerage added later.
- Crew: 70

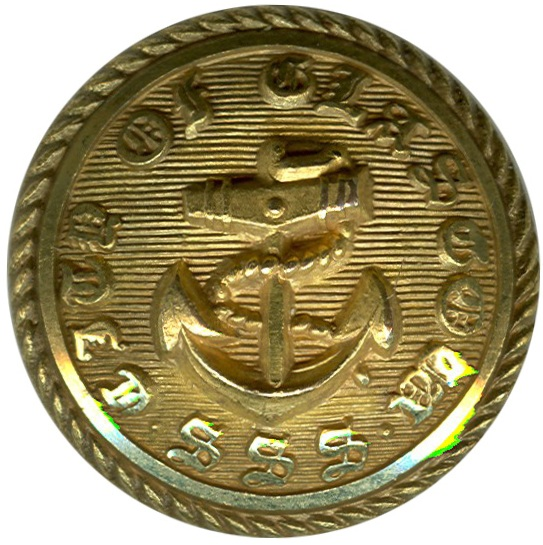
Button from officer's uniform

SS City of Glasgow (1850) was a single-screw iron hulled passenger steamship of the Inman Line. Based on ideas pioneered by Isambard Kingdom Brunel's SS Great Britain, City of Glasgow established that Atlantic steamships could be operated profitably without government subsidy. After a refit in 1852, she was also the first Atlantic steamship to carry steerage passengers, representing a significant improvement in the conditions experienced by immigrants. In March 1854 City of Glasgow vanished while enroute from Liverpool to Philadelphia with 480 passengers and crew aboard.

== Predecessors ==
SS City of Glasgow (1822) a wooden was the first ship of the eponymous City of Glasgow Steam Packet Company, founded in 1831. SS City of Glasgow (1835), also wooden.

== Development and design ==
Built by Tod & Macgregor of Partick, Glasgow and launched on 28 February 1850, City of Glasgow at first carried 44 first class and 85 second class passengers along with 1,200 tons of cargo. Her iron hull considerably reduced repair costs incurred by the wooden-hulled steamships of the day, and the use of a propeller instead of paddle wheels allowed more space for passengers and cargo. City of Glasgow especially economical because she was not built for speed; her best time across the Atlantic was 14 days, 4 hours, almost 4 days longer than Cunard Line's Asia, the record holder in 1850. While the City of Glasgow's two-cylinder lever-beam engine of 350 horsepower (260 kW) produced a moderate 9.5 knots (17.6 km/h; 10.9 mph), her coal consumption was only 20 tons per day, compared with 76 tons for Asia.

== Service history ==
She made five voyages on the Glasgow – New York City service on Tod & Macgregor's own account and sailed on her maiden voyage on 15 April 1850. City of Glasgow was the first steamship to travel from Glasgow to New York. William Inman, a business partner of the line of sailing packets, persuaded his other partners to expand their line by buying the advanced new steamship. On 5 October 1850, she was purchased by the newly formed Liverpool and Philadelphia Steam Ship Company (also known as the Inman Line) and moved to the Liverpool – Philadelphia route from 17 December 1850. In 1852, the company entered the immigrant trade and City of Glasgow was refitted to accommodate an additional 400 third class passengers in her holds.

Cabins were available in state rooms from fifteen to twenty one guineas for each berth. Steerage passengers were charged eight guineas. Dogs were £3.

== Disappearance ==
City of Glasgow left Liverpool on 1 March 1854, with 430 people aboard. There were 61 cabin and saloon passengers and 293 in steerage. Her crew was 73: captain and 4 officers, 1 surgeon, 1 purser, 4 engineers, 6 firemen, 5 coal trimmers, 19 stewards and waiters, 1 stewardess, 1 quartermaster and 27 able seamen. She sailed under Captain Kenneth Morrison. This was his first voyage in command, but he had served as her chief officer for many months before. He was reported to have considerable experience in navigating the Atlantic. She was due to return from Philadelphia on 25 March 1854.

No word was received from the ship after she left Liverpool. Her sister ship, the City of Manchester, met many icebergs and large fields of ice on her journey from Philadelphia on 8 March. Other ships reported that the ice was greater than had been witnessed for many years. Large icebergs and fields of ice were in the course that the steamers usually used. When news of her delay reached the ship's owners, they issued a report stating that they felt the ship had been detained in the ice. She was well supplied with water, coal and provisions. However, by the end of May 1854 she was accepted as lost. The ship and her cargo was insured for £50,000.

Her fate remains a mystery. Newspapers of the day reported various sightings of the ship, but these were often contradictory. For example, the captain of the Baldaur spotted a large steamer with a list to port on 21 April; however, he asserted it was "unlike that ill-fated vessel". The Mary Morris came upon the hull of a large iron vessel that was apparently Clyde built and thought to be of the City of Glasgow. However the owners of the City of Glasgow ascertained that this was in fact the Shannon from Glasgow to Montreal.

It was reported that a portion of the bow of a ship, bearing the name City of Glasgow in gilded letters, washed ashore at Ballochgair near Campbeltown on 25 October 1854. However another ship called City of Glasgow at 416 tons had sailed from the Clyde under Muir towards Calcutta at the end of October. She may have been caught in late gales in the area but continued on her way. Lloyd's List reported a head-board been found with City of Glasgow on it in Kilbrannan Sound around the same time. This may be related to the Campbeltown find.

== Musical pieces ==
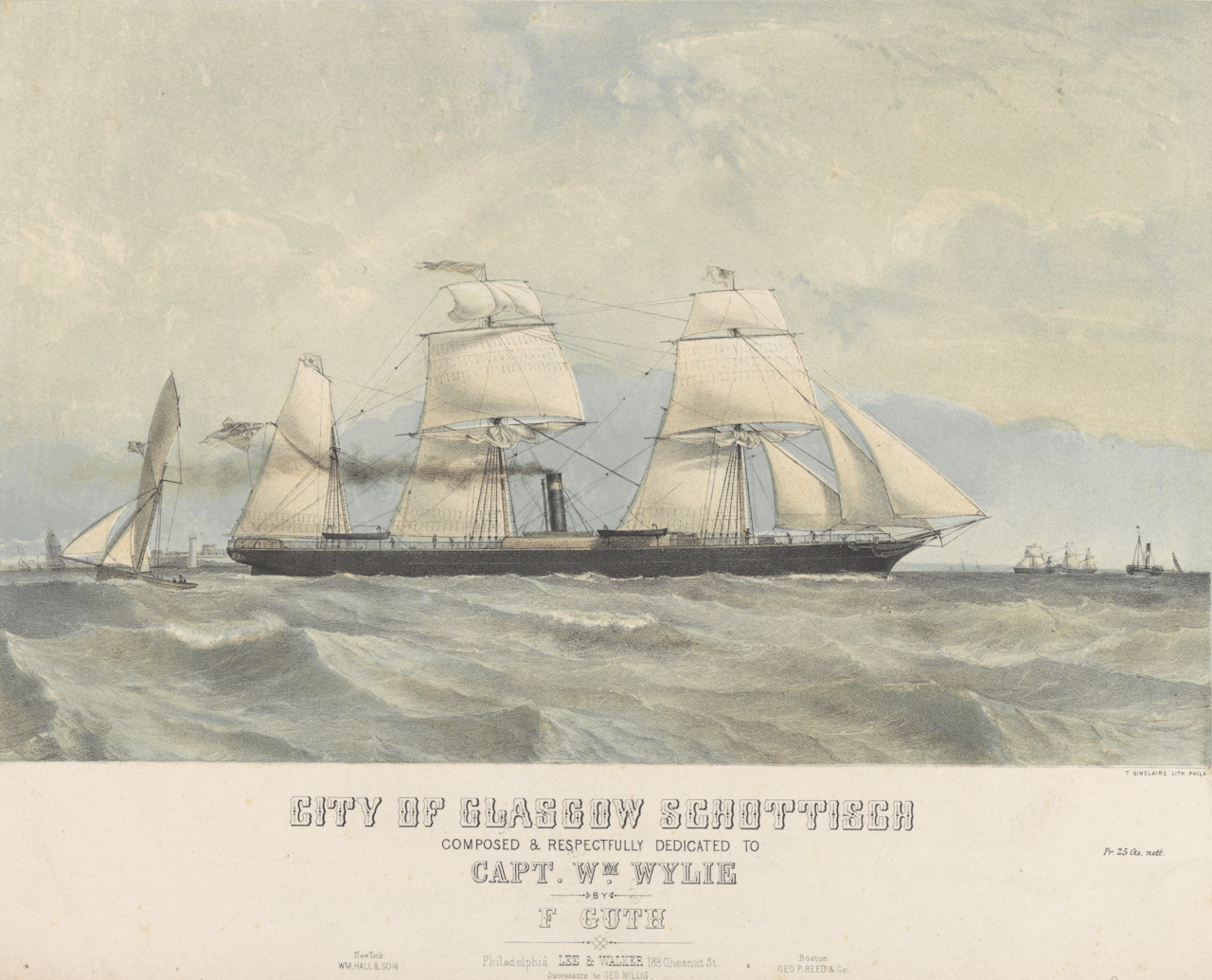
Cover of "City of Glasgow Schottisch"

In 1853, a musical piece titled "City of Glasgow Schottisch" was composed by F. Guth for the SS City of Glasgow.

== See also ==
- List of ocean liners
- List of United Kingdom disasters by death toll
