= SS City of London (1863) =

1863 steamship

History

United Kingdom
- Name: SS City of London
- Operator: Inman Line (1863–1878); Thistle Line (1878–1881)
- Ordered: 1859
- Builder: Tod & McGregor
- Laid down: 1861
- Launched: 21 April 1863
- Completed: 1863
- Fate: Lost at sea, 1881

General characteristics
- Class & type: Auxiliary steam passenger ship
- Tonnage: 2,560 GRT when built 2,765 GRT after enlargement
- Length: 102.4 m (336 ft), 114.6 m (376 ft) after improvements
- Beam: 12.3 m (40 ft)
- Height: 11 m (36 ft)
- Sail plan: 3 masted, ship rigged
- Speed: 15.3 kn (28.3 km/h; 17.6 mph) maximum

SS City of London was a passenger steamship built in Glasgow, Scotland, in 1863 by Tod & McGregor, and owned by the Inman Line.

She had a single funnel, and three masts.

She was in service sailing from Liverpool, to Queenstown, and then to New York with her maiden voyage dated July 8 1863. She carried immigrants from Liverpool to New York for many years.

In 1878 she was purchased by the Thistle Line.

In November 1881, 41 people died when she was lost at sea on passage from London to New York.
