= SS City of Philadelphia (1854) =

History

United Kingdom
- Name: SS City of Philadelphia
- Owner: Inman Line
- Route: Atlantic crossing.
- Launched: 30 May 1854
- Fate: Wrecked near Cape Race on maiden voyage, 7 September 1854

General characteristics
- Type: Steamship
- Tonnage: 2,150 GRT
- Length: 292 ft (89 m)
- Beam: 37 ft (11 m)
- Sail plan: 3 masts

The SS City of Philadelphia was an iron-hulled single screw passenger steam ship owned by the Liverpool and Philadelphia Steam Ship Company, also known as the "Inman Line."

The third vessel owned by the company, City of Philadelphia was an improvement on the design of SS City of Manchester.

On 7 September 1854, she was wrecked near Cape Race on her maiden voyage, without loss of life.
