= SS City of Glasgow =

Many ships have borne the name City of Glasgow including:

- SS City of Glasgow (1850)
- SS City of Glasgow (1906)
