= SS City of Brooklyn =

Coordinates: 49.52°N 63.1°W

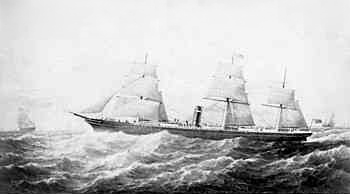

History
- Name: SS City of Brooklyn (1869-1878); SS Brooklyn (1878-1885)
- Operator: Inman Line (1869-1878); Dominion Line (1878-1885)
- Builder: Tod & McGregor, Glasgow
- Yard number: 145
- Launched: 2 December 1868
- Fate: Wrecked on 8 November 1885

General characteristics
- Type: Passenger cargo vessel
- Tonnage: 2,911 GRT; 1,979 NRT
- Length: 370 ft (110 m)
- Beam: 42 ft (13 m)
- Depth: 28.5 ft (8.7 m)
- Propulsion: 1-Screw, Steam 2cyl horizontal, 450nhp, 2000ihp

SS City of Brooklyn was a steam ship built in Glasgow in 1868 by Tod & McGregor. She was initially owned and operated by the Inman Line. She was of 2,911 GRT and was 370 ft (110 m) long and with a beam of 42 ft (13 m). She was used on sailings between Liverpool and New York. She was wrecked on 8 November 1885 on Anticosti Island. There were no deaths.
