= RMS City of Chester =

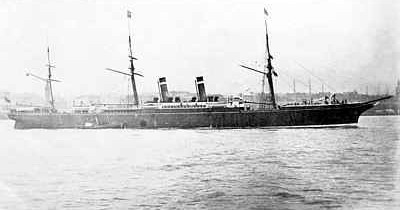

History

United Kingdom
- Name: RMS City of Chester
- Owner: Inman Line
- Route: Liverpool–New York
- Builder: Caird & Company, Greenock, Scotland
- Yard number: 171
- Launched: 29 March 1873
- In service: 10 July 1873
- Out of service: February 1893
- Fate: Transferred to American Line, 1893; Scrapped, 1907

General characteristics
- Tonnage: 4,566 GRT
- Length: 444 ft 6 in (135.48 m)
- Beam: 44 ft 2 in (13.46 m)
- Depth: 34 ft 7 in (10.54 m)
- Propulsion: 1 × 850 nhp 2-cylinder compound steam engine; 1 screw
- Sail plan: Full-rigged ship
- Speed: 15 knots (28 km/h; 17 mph)
- Capacity: 1,515 passengers

RMS City of Chester was a British passenger steamship that sailed on the transatlantic route from 1873 to 1898.

The ship was built by Caird & Company of Greenock for the Inman Line. At 4,566 tons she became the largest passenger ship afloat when launched on 29 March 1873 – a title she held until the 5,000-ton Britannic was launched in February 1874. Propulsion was by a 2-cylinder compound steam engine with nominal 850 horsepower, which drove a single 21-foot (6.4 m) diameter screw, and she was also ship-rigged with three masts. On sea trials, sailing from the Clyde to the Mersey, she made over 15 knots (28 km/h; 17 mph).

The ship was 444 feet long and 44 feet in the beam, and could accommodate over 1,500 passengers; 125 in 1st class, 80 in second class, and 1,310 in steerage. The first-class passengers enjoyed luxurious facilities; a walnut-panelled saloon with piano and library, a smoking room, and barber-shop. There was also a "Ladies Boudoir", and separate Ladies and Gentlemen's bath-rooms with marble sea-water baths. Forward, the steerage passengers slept in bunks.

On 11 October 1872, while the ship was finishing construction at the Caird Shipyard, it was boarded and shown to Japanese Ambassadors who were part of the Iwakura Mission.

The ship was employed on the Liverpool–Queenstown–New York route, making her maiden voyage on 10 July 1873. In February 1893 the Inman Line was taken over by the American Line and the ship was renamed Chester, making her first voyage under her new owners from New York to Southampton on 4 March 1893.

In 1898 she was sold to the United States Government, and renamed Sedgwick, serving as a U.S. Army transport ship during the Spanish–American War. In early March 1900, the Secretary of War Elihu Root sailed aboard the Sedgwick to Havana for discussions with the Military Governor of Cuba, General Leonard Wood.

In 1903 she was sold to an Italian shipping company and first renamed Arizona, then in 1906 Napoletano, before finally being scrapped in Italy in 1907.
