= SS City of Cork =

British single screw steamer (built 1862)

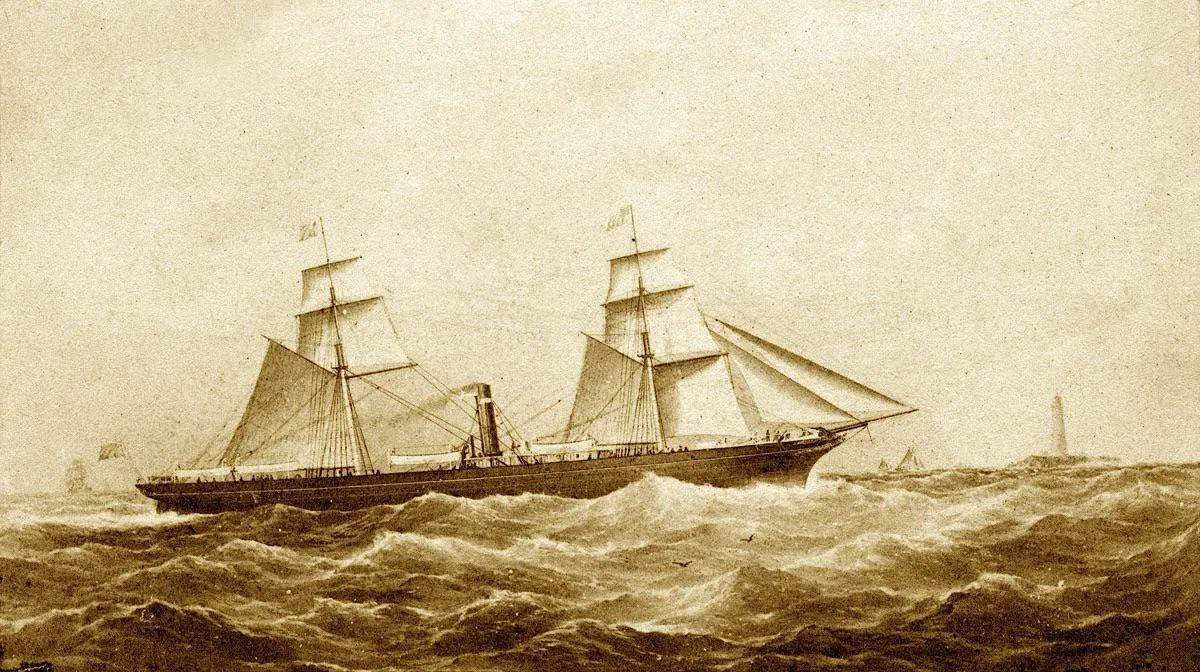
- City of Cork

History
- Name: City of Cork (1863–1871); Mediterraneo (1871–1900)
- Owner: Inman Line (1863–1871); I. & V. Florio (1871–81); Navigazione Generale Italiana (1881–1900)
- Port of registry: (United Kingdom of Great Britain and Ireland) Liverpool, United Kingdom (1862–1871); (Kingdom of Italy) Palermo, Italy (1871–1900)
- Route: Trans-Atlantic route
- Ordered: 1862
- Builder: William Denny & Co.
- Yard number: 86
- Launched: 22 November 1862
- Maiden voyage: 21 March 1863
- Identification: British Official Number 45864; Code letters VGCN (1863–71)
- Fate: Scrapped in 1900

General characteristics
- Type: Ocean liner
- Tonnage: 1,546 GRT, 1,084 NRT
- Length: 227 feet (69 m)
- Beam: 33 feet (10 m)
- Depth: 26 feet (7.9 m)
- Installed power: 2-cylinder direct-acting engine, 166nhp
- Propulsion: single screw propeller
- Speed: 10 knots
- Capacity: 60 1st, 150 3rd class

SS City of Cork was an iron-hulled British single-screw steamer passenger liner completed for the Inman Line in 1863. She was sold to Italy in 1871 and renamed Mediterraneo, remaining in service until c. 1900, when she was scrapped.

== Description ==
City of Cork was built by William Denny & Co., Dumbarton, United Kingdom, as yard number 86. She was laid down on 12 July 1862 as a speculation for Denny's and the Glasgow shipowner P. Henderson & Company, and launched without name on 22 November.

The ship was 227 feet (69 m) long, with a beam of 33 feet (10 m) and a depth of 26 feet (7.9 m). She was assessed at 1,546 GRT, 1,084 NRT. Her capacity was 60 first class and 150 third class passengers.

City of Cork was "fitted by John F. Spencer" with two "direct acting engines" which were "of the inverted type working with surface-condensers," with the condenser "between the two engines, and assisted to support the cylinders." It was reported that the ship "only consumed 2 lb (0.91 kg) of coal per indicated horsepower per hour." Both cylinders were of 50 inches (130 cm) diameter by 36 inches (91 cm) stroke. The engine was rated at 166nhp and 830ihp, making over 10 knots on trials.

== Inman Line service ==
The liner's addition to the Liverpool, Philadelphia and New York Steamship Company (Inman Line) passenger and mail service was announced in March 1863. She was readied at Liverpool for her maiden voyage, departing on 21 March 1863 for Queenstown and New York. The addition of City of Cork, along with the similarly named City of London, City of Limerick and City of Dublin, to the Inman Line in 1863 allowed the fleet to run transatlantic trips three times a fortnight and eventually twice a week and to include a call at Halifax, Nova Scotia.

On 17 May 1865, sailing from New York, she arrived in Queenstown with damaged machinery. In leaving under tow to Liverpool for repairs she collided with the liner Helvetia of the National Steam Navigation Company, Liverpool.

Inman Line's City of Washington become disabled on 5 April 1866, in mid-Atlantic, 1,000 nautical miles (1,900 km; 1,200 mi) west of Ireland, after losing her rudder and propeller. Her passengers were taken off and brought to Queenstown, but the casualty drifted in heavy gales for 23 days until City of Cork encountered her and, with some difficulty, took her in tow towards the Irish port, and subsequently onwards to Liverpool.

On 26 May 1868, City of Cork, from Liverpool for Halifax, was again disabled, this time by a broken propeller shaft, 210 nautical miles (390 km; 240 mi) west of Queenstown, but was able to reach there under sail alone after two days.

== Italian service ==
In 1871, City of Cork was sold to I. & V. Florio, Palermo, Sicily, Italy. She was renamed Mediterraneo and sailed from Liverpool on 7 September for Palermo in ballast.

On 12 March 1876, she was badly damaged, including losing her bowsprit, when she collided with the anchored Cunard liner Saragossa off Livorno.

The Florio company merged with the Genoa-based Compagnia Rubattino in 1881 and formed Navigazione Generale Italiana. Mediterraneo served until the late 1890s. The ship was sold in second quarter of 1899 to be scrapped.
