= SS City of Manchester (1851) =

- The 'City of Manchester' screw steamer (The Illustrated London News, 1851)

History

United Kingdom
- Name: SS City of Manchester
- Owner: Inman Line
- Route: Atlantic crossing.
- Builder: Tod and Macgregor, Partick, Glasgow
- Launched: 14 June 1851
- Maiden voyage: Liverpool—Philadelphia, 26 July 1851
- Fate: Wrecked in 1876

General characteristics
- Type: Steamship
- Tonnage: 2,109 GRT
- Length: 265.3 ft (80.9 m)
- Beam: 37.5 ft (11.4 m)
- Propulsion: steam & sail
- Sail plan: 4 masts
- Speed: 9 knots

The SS City of Manchester was an iron-hulled single screw liner built 1851 by Tod & McGregor, Glasgow, Scotland and the second such ship owned by the Inman Line (officially the Liverpool and Philadelphia Steam Ship Company). It was an improved version of their first ship City of Glasgow which had been launched a year earlier.

Steerage passengers were carried beginning in 1852. The City of Manchester was chartered to the French government during the Crimean War, and resumed Inman voyages in 1856. She departed London for Calcutta 24 August 1857 as a transport as a result of the Indian Mutiny. By the next year, New York replaced Philadelphia as the American destination. After 20 years of Inman service, the City of Manchester was sold and converted to sail. She was wrecked near Akyab, Burma in November 1876.

== References cited ==
- Gibbs, C. R. Vernon (1957). Passenger Liners of the Western Ocean: A Record of Atlantic Steam and Motor Passenger Vessels from 1838 to the Present Day. John De Graff. p. 116.
- S. Swiggum and M. Kohli (3 February 2005). "Inman Line / Liverpool and Philadelphia Steamship Company / Liverpool, New York and Philadelphia Steamship Company". TheShipsList.
- S. Swiggum and M. Kohli (1 November 2008). "Ship Descriptions - C: City of Manchester 1851". TheShipsList.
- Stephen P. Morse & Susan E. Swiggum. "None (List of ships named City of Manchester)". t.
