= SS City of Paris (1865) =

British passenger steamer

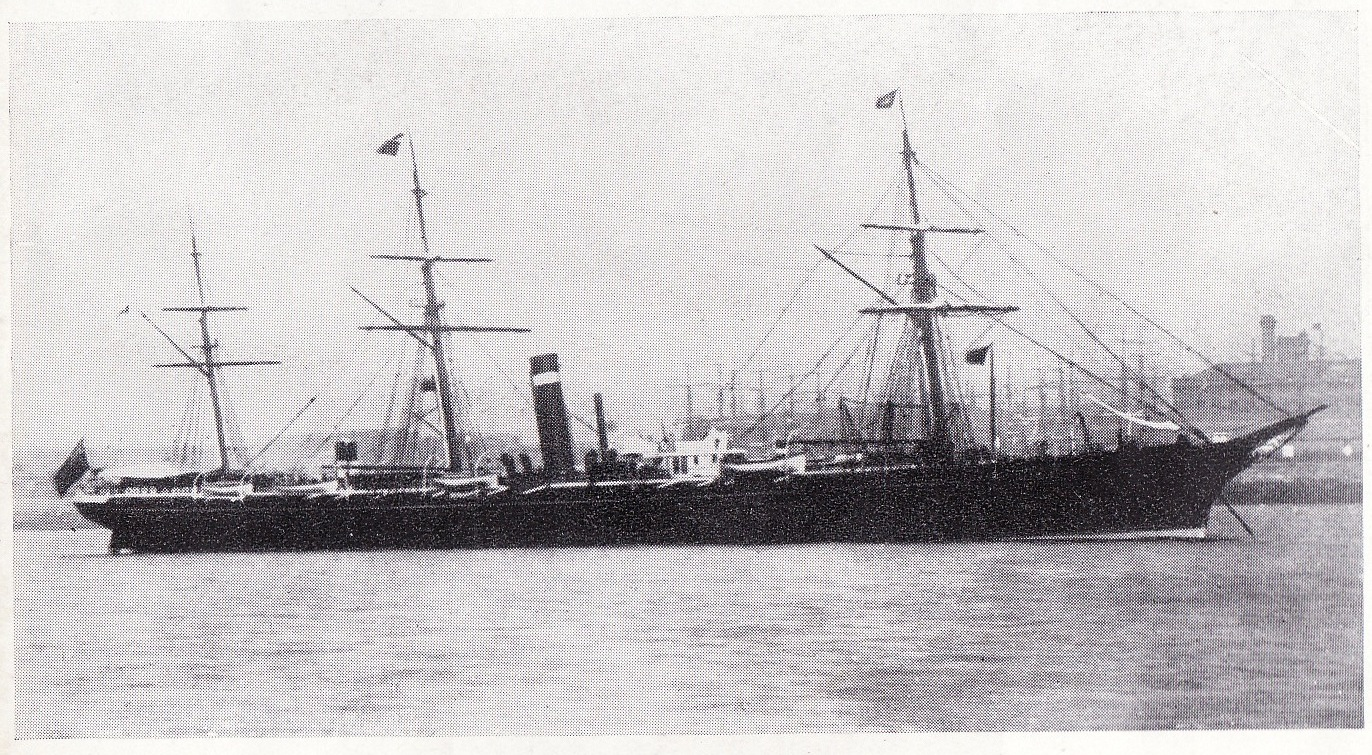
- Inman's City of Paris of 1866

History

United Kingdom
- Name: City of Paris
- Owner: Inman Line
- Route: Atlantic crossing.
- Builder: Tod and Macgregor, Partick, Glasgow, Scotland
- Launched: 6 December 1865
- Fate: Sold in 1884 to become the French Tonquin; Sunk in collision 4 March 1885

General characteristics
- Type: Steamship
- Tonnage: 2,650 GRT
- Length: 346 ft (105 m)
- Beam: 40 ft (12 m)
- Sail plan: 3 masts
- Capacity: Post 1870 refit- 150 saloon and 400 steerage.

City of Paris was a British passenger liner operated by the Inman Line that established that a ship driven by a screw could match the speed of the paddlers on the Atlantic crossing. Built by Tod and Macgregor, she served the Inman Line until 1884 when she was converted to a cargo ship.

== Development and design ==
By the end of the American Civil War in 1865, Inman was the largest passenger steam ship line to America, and was known for its screw-propelled ships that were economical, but not especially fast. When in 1862 Cunard commissioned RMS Scotia, a paddle wheel Blue Riband holder, it also commissioned China, the first screw steamer in Cunard's express mail service. While China was only a knot slower than Scotia, China's coal consumption was only half of Scotia's while China carried more cargo. Cunard quickly ordered two additional screw steamers to partner the paddlers Scotia and RMS Persia on the New York express route. Cunard also opened a secondary service for immigrants that directly competed against Inman. Inman countered Cunard by opening its own express service. With City of Paris, Tod and Macgregor started construction of five fast liners for Inman's Liverpool - New York route to rival the Cunard Line's best. In response, Cunard commissioned its own fast screw express liners, starting with Russia, which replaced Persia in 1867.

== Service history ==
A model of the City of Paris at the Science Museum in London.

After entering service in 1866, City of Paris established herself as at least the equal of Cunard's Scotia. Gibbs credits City of Paris herself with the Blue Riband for a November 1866 westbound voyage from Queenstown to New York at 13.75 knots. However, most nautical historians list Scotia as the record holder for her 1862 voyage at 14.46 knots that Gibbs discounts because Scotia claimed a particularly long track. In a famous February 1868 race, City of Paris and Russia sailed from New York within an hour of each other. The Inman liner claimed 8 days, 19 hours, 23 minutes to Queenstown, while the Cunarder required 42 minutes longer using a slightly different course. In part because of Inman's success with ships such as City of Paris, in 1867 the British Post Office Government awarded the Inman Line with a share of the North Atlantic mail contract. Throughout the 1870s, Inman's express service averaged lower passage times than Cunard's.

After four years of service, City of Paris was lengthened to 397 feet (121 metres) and re-engined with compounds in response to innovative ships built for the White Star Line. This raised her tonnage to 3100 and her capacity to 150 cabin and 400 steerage. On 21 March 1879, she grounded outside Simon's Town, Cape Colony while transporting troops from Queenstown, County Cork to Simon's Town. Her passengers were taken off by HMS Tamar. City of Paris was later refloated and taken in to Simon's Town. After her return, she was re-engined again. City of Paris was relieved in 1883 in the express service by City of Chicago and was sold to A Hoffnung & Company, London. In March 1884 she was one of the ships that participated in the 1878-to-1911 wave of Portuguese immigration to Hawaii, when she arrived on 13 June 1884 in Hawaii at Honolulu Harbor with 824 Portuguese immigrants from the Azores and Madeira Island to work as contract labor in the Hawaiian sugarcane plantations. The ship was subsequently sold to French owners who chartered her to the French Government as Tonquin to carry troops from Marseille, France, to Tonkin. However, en route to Marseille, she sank on 4 March 1885 off Málaga after colliding with the steamship Maurice et Réunion, with the loss of the master and 23 crew members from her 68 crew.
