= Inman Line =

Former British shipping line

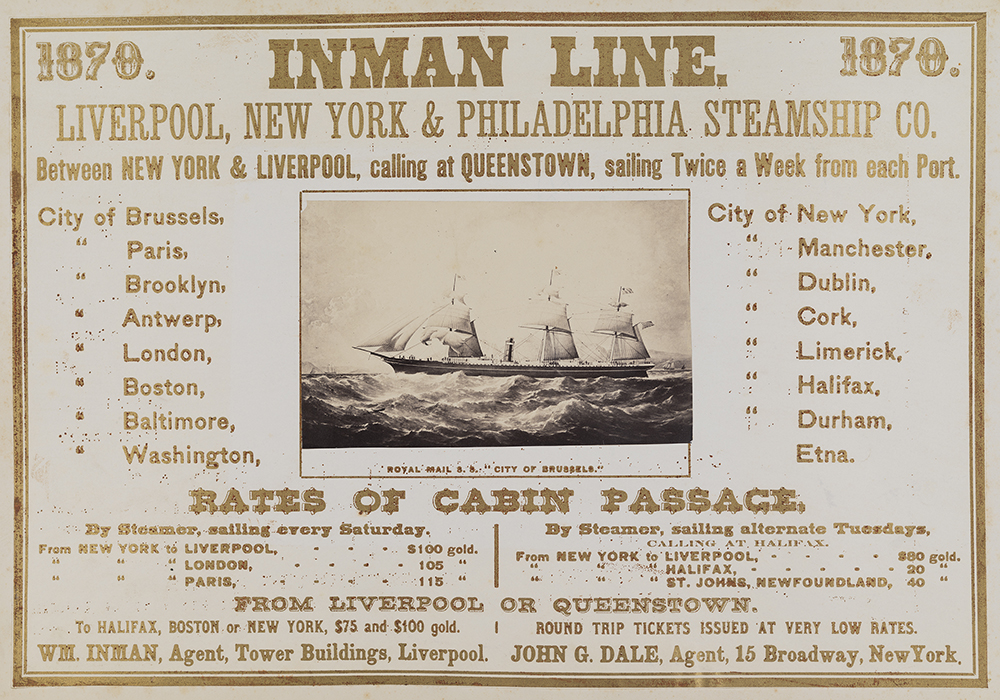
- Advertisment for the Inman Line
- Industry: Shipping and transportation
- Founded: 1850; 176 years ago
- Founder: William Inman
- Defunct: 1886
- Fate: Purchased by International Navigation Company in 1886; Absorbed into American Line in 1893
- Successor: Inman and International Steamship Company
- Headquarters: Liverpool, England
- Area served: Transatlantic
- Footnotes House flag

The Inman Line was one of the three largest 19th-century British passenger shipping companies on the North Atlantic, along with the White Star Line and Cunard Line. Founded in 1850, it was absorbed in 1893 into American Line. The firm's formal name for much of its history was the Liverpool, Philadelphia and New York Steamship Company, but it was also variously known as the Liverpool and Philadelphia Steamship Company, as Inman Steamship Company, Limited, and, in the last few years before absorption, as the Inman and International Steamship Company.

By embracing new technology, Inman Line became the first to show that unsubsidized ocean liners could profitably cross the North Atlantic. With its first steamer, City of Glasgow of 1850, Inman led the drive to replace wood-hulled paddle steamers with iron-hulled screw-propelled ships. In 1852, Inman established that steerage passengers could be transported in steamships. Inman's City of Paris of 1866 was the first screw liner that could match the speed of the paddlers. By 1870, Inman landed more passengers in New York than any other line.

In 1886, the US-owned International Navigation Company bought the company. The new owners began updating the express fleet with two Blue Riband winners, City of New York and the second City of Paris, ushering in the double-screw era that ended the need for auxiliary sails.

== History ==
=== 1850–66 ===
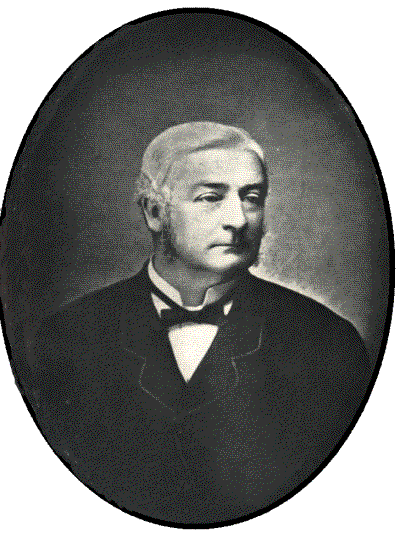
William Inman (1825–81)

The Inman Line had its roots in a line of sailing packets owned by John Grubb Richardson and his brothers along with their young business partner, William Inman (1825–81). In 1850, Inman persuaded his partners to form the Liverpool and Philadelphia Steamship Company and buy an advanced new ship, City of Glasgow. She proved profitable because her iron hull required less repair, and her screw propulsion system left more room for passengers and freight. City of Glasgow's moderate speed considerably reduced coal consumption. The ship's first voyage for her new owners departed for Philadelphia on 17 December 1850. The next year, she was joined by a larger edition, City of Manchester.

In 1852, the Inman broke new ground by transporting steerage passengers under steam. As Irish Quakers, the Richardsons were concerned about the poor conditions experienced by U.S.-bound emigrants, who traveled by sailing ship with unpredictable passage times. Steerage passengers were required to bring their own food, and often ran short. In 1836, Diamond lost 17 of her 180 steerage passengers to starvation when the ship required 100 days to make the crossing. From the beginning, Inman provided better steerage quarters and adopted the recommendation of a Parliamentary Committee to provide cooked meals to emigrants. As a result, Inman was able to charge steerage rates of 8 guineas, while the fastest sailing packets charged 4 to 6 guineas. During the period, Inman liners typically carried 500 passengers, 80 per cent in steerage.

Disaster struck the new firm in 1854 when the company lost both City of Glasgow with all hands and the brand new City of Philadelphia, albeit with no loss of life. The remaining liner, the City of Manchester, was chartered to the French government for the Crimean War, along with three more liners that were completed or bought in 1855. The Richardsons withdrew from the firm because of its involvement with the war, and William Inman assumed full control.

At the end of the war, Inman resumed service to Philadelphia. However, New York was the principal passenger arrival port in North America, and Inman soon altered its service routing. The firm's name was changed to the Liverpool, Philadelphia and New York Steam Ship Company, but all ships were routed to New York after its SS Kangaroo was trapped by ice in the Delaware River. Until 1857, the firm ran a fortnightly service from Liverpool. That same year Collins Line collapsed, and Inman succeeded it as the mail contractor for the United States Post Office. In 1859, a call at Queenstown was added to pick up Irish emigrants. The next year Inman ran a weekly service, increasing in 1863 to three sailings every fortnight, and twice a week during summer in 1866.

=== 1866–87 ===
With the celebrated City of Paris of 1866, the company ordered five express liners that matched the speed of Cunard's best. In 1867, responsibility for mail contracts was transferred from the Admiralty to the Post Office and opened for bid. Inman was awarded one of the three weekly New York mail services and the fortnightly route to Halifax, Nova Scotia formerly held by Cunard. While Cunard continued to receive a subsidy, Inman was paid sea postage. Two years later Inman's New York contract was extended for seven years at an annual subsidy of £35,000, half that of Cunard's subsidy of £70,000 for two weekly New York mail sailings. In 1870, Inman landed 44,100 passengers in New York, almost twice Cunard's 24,500, although Cunard still carried substantially more first-class passengers. Throughout the 1870s, Inman's passage times were shorter than Cunard's. City of Brussels of 1869 beat Scotia's eastbound record and in 1875 City of Berlin won the Blue Riband by taking the westbound record.

In 1871 both companies faced a new rival when White Star Line joined the Atlantic ferry with the revolutionary RMS Oceanic and her sisters. The new White Star record breakers were especially economical because of their use of compound engines. Oceanic consumed only 58 tons of coal per day, compared with 110 tons for City of Brussels. White Star also set new standards for comfort by placing the dining saloon midships and doubling the size of cabins. Inman reacted quickly, bringing its express liners back to the shipyards for compound engines and other changes to match the new White Star liners, while Cunard lagged behind.

The Panic of 1873 started a five-year shipping depression that strained the finances of Inman and its rivals. To raise more capital, the partnership was restructured in 1875 as a stock company and renamed the Inman Steamship Company, Limited. The next year, Inman and White Star agreed to coordinate their sailings to reduce competition. When the 1869 mail contracts expired, the UK Post Office ended both Cunard and Inman's subsidies and paid on the basis of weight, but at a rate substantially higher than paid by the US Post Office. Cunard's weekly New York mail sailings were reduced to one and White Star was awarded the third mail sailing. Every Tuesday, Thursday and Saturday, a liner from one of the three firms departed Liverpool with the mail for New York. Inman reduced its fleet so that only the express liners remained.

Profits still dropped in as new competitors sought the Blue Riband such as the National Line and the Guion Line, and numerous steamship concerns from mainland Europe competed for the emigrant trade. To restore its fortunes, Inman ordered City of Rome, which was designed as the largest and fastest liner yet. Unfortunately the ship failed to meet her design specifications and was rejected in 1882 after only six voyages.

William Inman died before the ship's maiden voyage and the company suffered without his leadership. In 1883, City of Brussels was lost in the Mersey after colliding with another steamship. Meanwhile, Cunard renewed its mail fleet with four exceptional steel-hulled liners. Needing capital to match its rivals, Inman directors agreed to voluntary liquidation so that the largest creditor, the Philadelphia-based International Navigation Company could buy Inman's assets.

=== Fate ===
The line was reorganized as the Inman and International Steamship Company, and its new owners provided the capital to build two outstanding record breakers, the twin-screw City of New York and City of Paris. However, the UK government responded to the ownership change by revoking Inman's mail contract. After considerable lobbying, the US Congress agreed to replace the contract and allow Inman to register its two new record breakers in the US if International Navigation built two similar express liners in US yards. Therefore, on 22 February 1893 the US flag was broken out over the two newest Inman vessels and the company merged into the American Line.

== Fleet ==
The Inman fleet—all of which built for Inman unless otherwise indicated—consisted of the following ships, presented in order of acquisition. List sourced from

List of Inman Line steamers
Ship	Built	In service for Inman	Type	GRT	Notes	Image
City of Glasgow	1850	1850–54	iron, screw	1,600	missing 1854, no survivors	
City of Manchester	1851	1851–71	iron, screw	1,900	sold and converted to sail 1871	
City of Philadelphia	1854	1854–54	iron, screw	2,100	wrecked, no loss of life	
City of Baltimore	1855	1855–74	iron, screw	2,400	sold	
City of Washington	1855	1855–73	iron-screw	2,400	wrecked 1873	
Kangaroo	1854	1855–69	iron, screw	1,850	built for other owners, sold 1869	
Virgo	1856	1858–61	iron, screw	1,600	built for other owners, sold to US Government 1861	
Glasgow	1851	1859–65	iron, screw	1,950	built for other owners, lost 1865	
Edinburgh	1855	1859–68	iron, screw	2,200	built for other owners, sold 1868	
Etna	1856	1860–75	iron, screw	2,200	built for Cunard, sold 1875	
City of New York	1861	1861–64	iron, screw	2,550	wrecked 1864	
City of London	1863	1863–78	iron, screw	2,550	sold 1878 to Thistle Line. Lost at sea, 1881.	
City of Cork	1863	1863–71	iron, screw	1,550	sold 1871	
City of Limerick	1863	1863–79	iron, screw	1,550	built for other owners, sold 1879	
City of Dublin	1864	1864–73	iron, screw	2,000	sold 1874 to Dominion Line	
City of Boston	1865	1865–70	iron, screw	2,200	missing 1870, no survivors	
City of New York	1865	1865–81	iron, screw	2,650	sold 1881	
City of Paris	1866	1866–84	iron, screw	2,650	sold 1884	
City of Antwerp	1867	1867–79	iron, screw	2,400	sold 1879	
City of Brooklyn	1869	1867–78	iron, screw	2,950	sold 1878 to Dominion Line	
City of Brussels	1869	1869–83	iron, screw	3,100	Eastbound record holder, sunk 1883, 10 lost	
City of Montreal	1872	1872–87	iron, screw	4,450	burned at sea 10 August 1887, no loss of life - passengers and crew were rescued by the Furness Line's York City	
City of Chester	1873	1873–93	iron, screw	4,800	express liner, joined American Line 1893	
City of Richmond	1873	1873–91	iron, screw	4,800	express liner, sold 1891	
City of Berlin	1875	1875–93	iron, screw	5,500	Blue Riband winner, joined American Line 1893	
City of Rome	1881	1881–81	iron, screw	8,413	returned to builder after 6 voyages, transferred to Anchor Line	
City of Chicago	1883	1883–92	steel, screw	5,150	built for other owners, wrecked 1892, no loss of life	
Baltic	1871	1885–86	iron, screw	3,850	chartered from White Star	
City of New York	1888	1888–93	steel, twin screw	10,650	Blue Riband winner, joined American Line 1893	
City of Paris	1888	1889–93	steel, twin screw	10,650	Blue Riband winner, joined American Line 1893	

== See also ==
- Liverpool, New York & Philadelphia Steamship Co. v. Commissioners of Emigration

In 1873, Alfred E. Warren wrote a theme for the line, called the Inman Line March. Unusually, it was written in 6/8 despite being a march.
