= John Macgregor =

Scottish shipbuilder

John Macgregor (1802–1858) was a Scottish shipbuilder.

== Birth and early life ==
John Macgregor was christened on 24 August 1802 at Fintry, Stirlingshire. He was the third son of Annie McNicol and James Macgregor, a clockmaker. He also had one elder sister, two younger sisters, and two younger brothers. His father qualified as a clockmaker and he moved through Balfron, Fintry, and Comrie with his family working all the time as an engineer in the cotton mills that were developing in these parts of the Highlands.

The family were incomers to Fintry, having moved from Balfron. They remained there for about 14 years, before moving on to Comrie in Perthshire, where the last two of their eight children were born. The stay in Comrie must have been short, although Macgregor received a rudimentary education there. When Macgregor was 16, the family moved to Glasgow.

Macgregor began his apprenticeship as an engineer under David Napier at Camlachie. He went to Lancefield Foundry with the others in 1821 and was a sea-going engineer on the Belfast – which had Napier machinery – while still in his early 20s. The Belfast plied between Liverpool and Dublin, and was one of the earliest steamers to cross the Irish Sea.

At David Napier's he made the acquaintance of David Tod. Together, they ran the engineering department for a while and gained considerable managerial experience during this period. They probably also acted as guarantee engineers from time to time.

== Tod and Macgregor ==
In 1833, Macgregor and David Tod formed a partnership to build steam engines. The partnership, Tod and Macgregor, was initially based at Carrick Street, Glasgow in 1834. The business grew quickly and moved to larger premises in Worroch Street, where they added boiler making to their engineering activities.

Towards the end of 1836, Tod and Macgregor opened a shipbuilding yard on the south bank of the River Clyde at Mavisbank. Finally, in 1845, the firm moved to a new purpose-built yard at Meadowside in the Borough of Partick. Tod and Macgregor were described as "the fathers of iron shipbuilding on the Clyde", building famous ships such as the City of Glasgow and the City of Paris.

In about 1830, he is assumed to have married Margaret Fleming (born 23 March 1809), the daughter of Margaret Biggar and James Fleming. Together they had seven children, of whom three daughters and two sons survived.

In 1834, Macgregor was to be found at 90 Carrick Street, and by 1841 had moved to Clydebank with Margaret and the family, who were found there at the time of the 1841 census. In 1845, he gave his address as Rutland Place, which may have been the same as Clydebank. The family must have moved as the shipyard went to Meadowside in 1846 as he was registered as living at Meadowside House, Partick in 1848.

On 18 September 1848 his wife Margaret Fleming died at the age of 39, the cause of her death is not known. On 9 March 1851 he married Margaret York (born 20 April 1823), the daughter of Janet Masterton and William York, at Barony, Glasgow. Together they had two children, William York Macgregor (born Finnart House, Loch Long, Dunbartonshire, 14 October 1855; died Oban, 28 September 1923) and Peter Macgregor (born 21 February 1857 at Partick; died Hove, Sussex 22 April 1901). At the time of the 1851 census, Margaret York, and the children from Macgregor's first marriage, were found at Meadowside House in Partick.

In around 1874, after the deaths of both David Tod and John Macgregor, the shipbuilding business was sold and renamed as D. and W. Henderson and Company.

== Death and obituaries ==
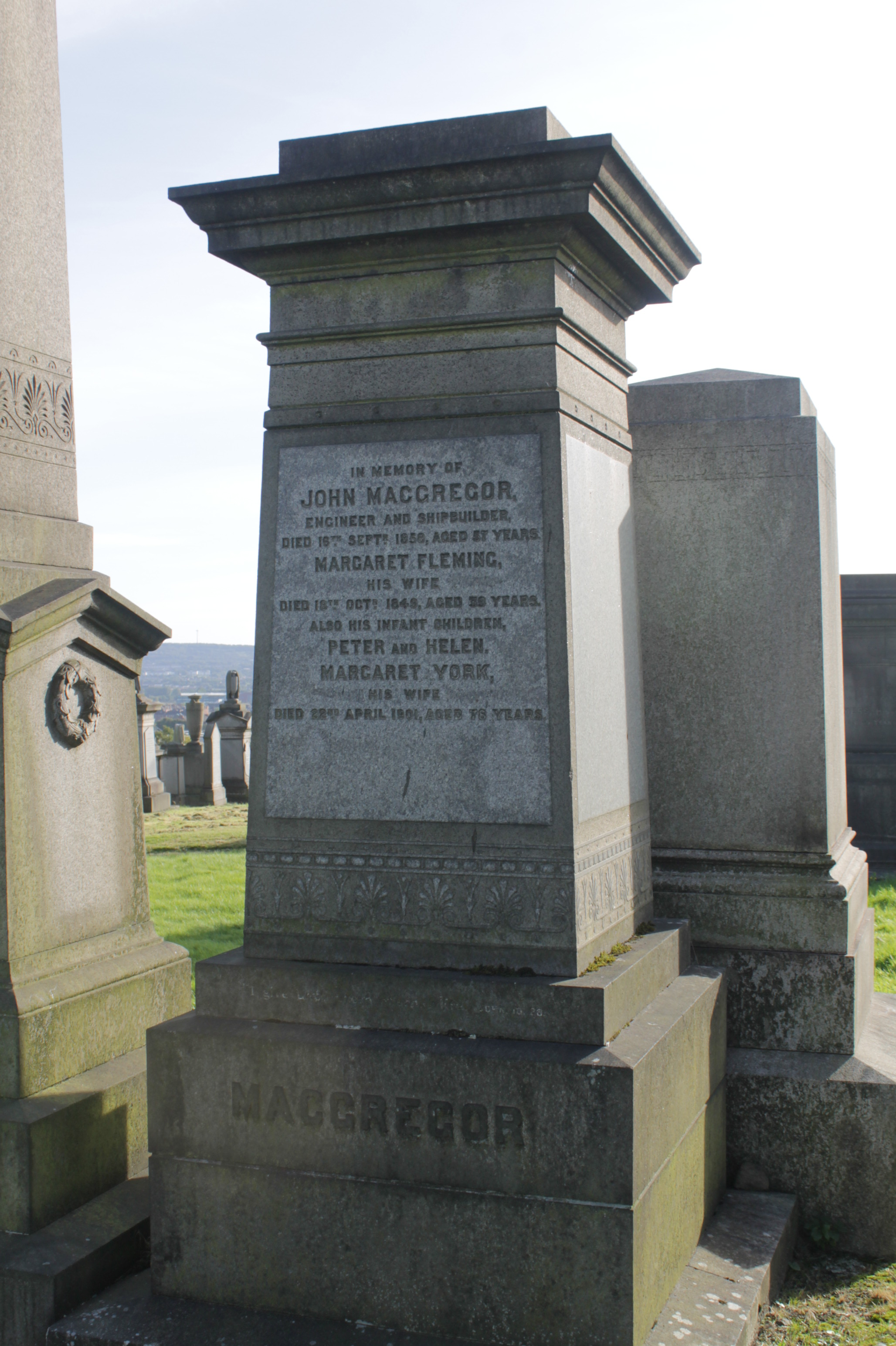
The grave of John Macgregor, Glasgow Necropolis

Macgregor died on 16 September 1858 from constipation, a treatable problem today. He is buried in the north-east section of the upper plateau at Glasgow Necropolis.

When his funeral cortege took place, beginning at North Street, Anderston, the shops in Partick were closed, the route was lined with thousands of spectators with 'grieved countenances', the bells of the city churches were tolled from 2- to 3 o'clock', and the flags in the harbour and on the shipping were at half-mast. His obituary states: "At the comparatively early age of 57, in the full flush and vigour of his mature manhood, after an illness of only three days, of constipation of the bowels, Mr Macgregor departed this life, at half past eleven o'clock on Thursday night, at his town residence, Meadowside House, Partick.

== Family ==
He was married twice: firstly to Margaret Fleming (1810–1849) then to Margaret York (1823–1901).
