= Harward =

Harward is a surname. Notable people with the surname include:

- Charles Harward (1723–1802), Anglican priest
- Donald West Harward, American philosopher, author, and academic administrator
- John Harward (1858–1932), British educationist and Principal of Royal College Colombo
- Robert Harward, American defense contractor for Lockheed Martin
- Robert Harward (MP) (d. c. 1534), English politician
- Samuel Harward (c. 1740–1809), English printer
- William Harward (d. 1589), Canon of Windsor

== See also ==
- Harvard (disambiguation)
