= Harvard (disambiguation) =

Harvard University is a university in Cambridge, Massachusetts, US.

Harvard may also refer to:

== People ==
- Harvard (name), a given name and surname, including list of people with this name

== Boston area ==
- Harvard Book Store, an independent bookstore in Harvard Square
- Harvard Bridge, a bridge over the Charles River near the Massachusetts Institute of Technology
- Harvard Club of Boston, a private social club founded by Harvard alumni
- Harvard College, the undergraduate division of Harvard University
- Harvard Crimson, Harvard University's athletic program
- The Harvard Crimson, Harvard University's daily student newspaper
- Harvard Square, a plaza in Cambridge, Massachusetts, adjacent to the Harvard University campus
- Harvard Yard, the center of the Harvard campus, adjacent to Harvard Square
- Harvard (MBTA station), the subway station located in Harvard Square

== Cities ==
- Harvard, Idaho
- Harvard, Illinois, a city in the United States
- Harvard, Massachusetts, a town in the United States
- Harvard, Nebraska, a city in the United States
- Harvard Township, Clay County, Nebraska, a township in the United States

== Aeroplanes ==
- Harvard (aeroplane), often used name for the North American T-6
- Harvard Blue Yonder EZ (aeroplane), a replica of the Harvard

== Ships ==
- List of ships named Harvard
- USS Harvard, several ships of the United States Navy

== Other ==
- Harvard architecture, a type of computer architecture
- Harvard (automobile), a Brass Era car built in New York between 1915 and 1921
- Harvard Graphics, an early breaking computer software for handling diagrams
- Harvard Mark I, an early digital computer
- Harvard referencing, a citation style also known as the "author-date method"
- Harvard station (disambiguation), stations of the name
- Harvard-Westlake School, a prep school in Los Angeles
- Harvard 736 (planet), a minor planet orbiting the Sun
- Fender Harvard, a guitar amplifier
- Harvard Islands, an island group in northwestern Greenland
- Sime Darby Harvard Championship, a golf tournament held in Kedah, Malaysia
