= RMS Teutonic =

British ocean liner

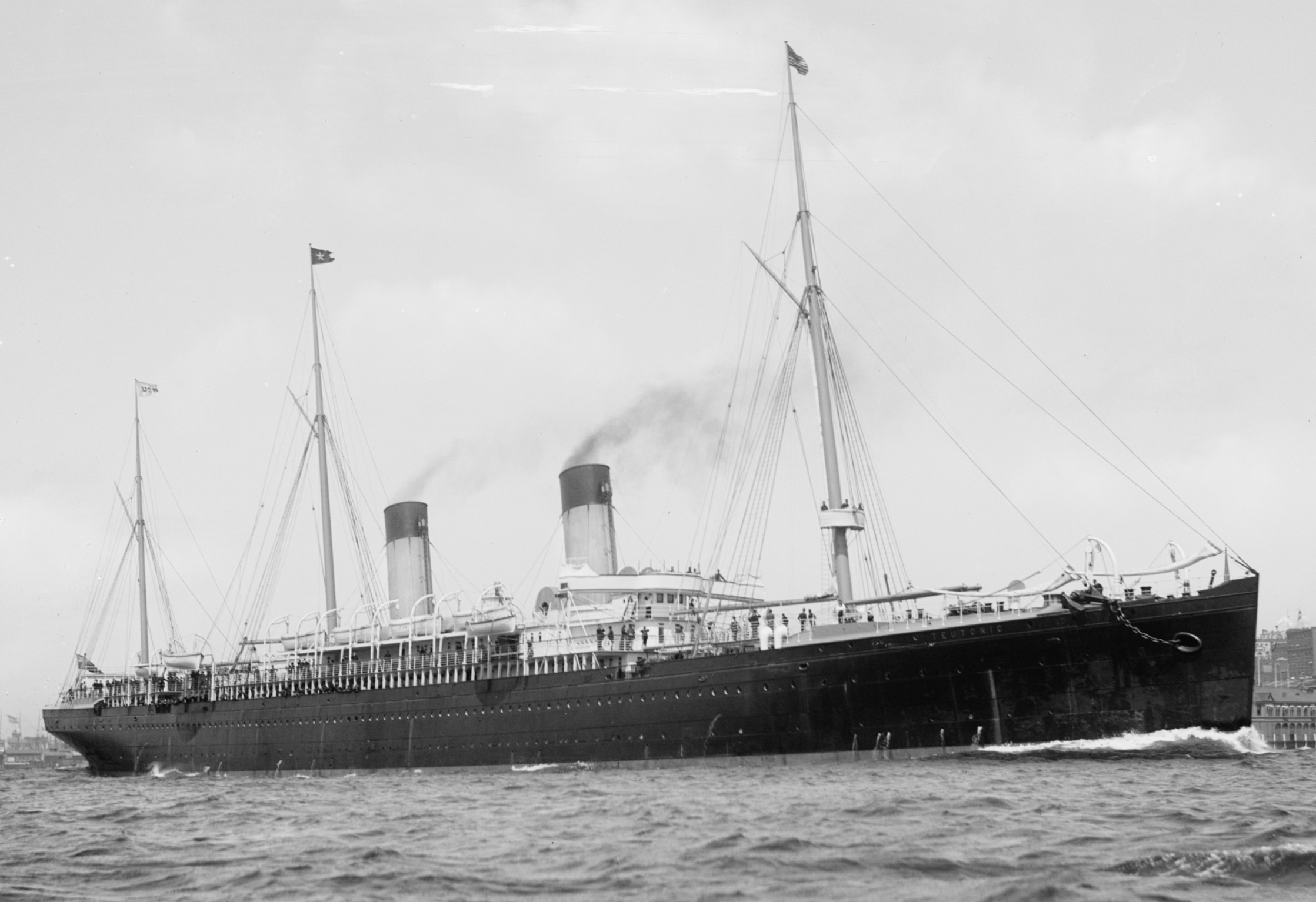

History

United Kingdom
- Name: Teutonic
- Owner: White Star Line
- Operator: White Star Line
- Port of registry: Liverpool, United Kingdom
- Route: Liverpool–Queenstown–New York (1889-1907); Southampton-Cherbourg-New York (1907-1911); Liverpool-Québec-Montreal (1911-1914)
- Builder: Harland and Wolff, Belfast
- Yard number: 208
- Laid down: March 1887
- Launched: 19 January 1889
- Completed: 25 July 1889
- Maiden voyage: 7 August 1889
- Fate: Scrapped in Emden in 1921

General characteristics
- Class & type: Teutonic class ocean liner
- Tonnage: 9,984 GRT, 4,269 NRT
- Length: 582 feet (177.7 m)
- Beam: 57.7 feet (17.6 m)
- Propulsion: Two triple expansion engines powering two propellers.
- Speed: 20 knots (37 km/h) – 23 knots (43 km/h)
- Capacity: Original configuration: 300 First Class, 190 Second Class, 1,000 Third Class passengers

RMS Teutonic was an ocean liner built for the White Star Line in Belfast, which entered service in 1889. She was the sister ship of RMS Majestic. Teutonic and her sister were the flagships of White Star Line's fleet for around a decade, until Oceanic entered service in 1899. She had a career of 32 years, which included war service during World War I, until being scrapped in 1921.

Teutonic was historically notable for three reasons: for being the first armed merchant cruiser; for being the inspiration behind Germany's Kaiser-class ocean liners; and for being the last White Star ship to hold the Blue Riband.

== History ==
=== Background ===
In the late 1880s competition for the Blue Riband, the award for the fastest Atlantic crossing, was fierce amongst the top steamship lines, and White Star decided to order two ships from Harland and Wolff that would be capable of an average Atlantic crossing speed of 20 knots (37 km/h; 23 mph). Construction of Teutonic and Majestic began in 1887. Teutonic and her sister were the first new additions to White Star's transatlantic fleet since the Britannic and Germanic had respectively entered service in 1874 and 1875. Teutonic replaced the ageing Baltic, which had been in service with White Star since 1871 and was subsequently sold to new owners. The pair were designed to allow White Star to compete with a new generation of liners which had entered service in the 1880s, such as the Cunard Line's Umbria and Etruria, and the Inman Line's duo of City of New York and City of Paris.

Teutonic and her sister were built under the British Auxiliary Armed Cruiser Agreement, under which they were built with government financial support, to Admiralty specifications, and received an operating subsidy from the British government. In return they would be made available to the government in times of war, to be used as armed merchant cruisers. Teutonic was the first such ship to be built under this arrangement.

=== Specifications ===
Teutonic and Majestic were the first White Star liners to have two engines, and two propellers, which allowed them to dispense with the auxiliary sails which had been required on earlier single-screw liners. They were powered by two triple expansion steam engines, which together produced 17,000 indicated horsepower (13,000 kW).

Teutonic and Majestic were built with three classes of accommodation, first, second and third (commonly known as steerage) they could carry 300 first class, 190 second class, and 1,000 third class passengers.

The first class accommodation was situated amidships where the motion of the ship was not so extreme, the two funnels were widely spaced so that the first class dining saloon could be situated between them, and be large enough to seat all 300 first class passengers in one sitting. The first class incorporated a number of single berth cabins to allow a passenger to have a room to themselves. The first class passengers were provided with a number of public rooms, including a library, a smoking room, and a barbers shop, all of which were richly decorated.

The second class accommodation was located abaft of the mainmast, and second class passengers were provided with their own open promenade deck.

The third class was, by the standards of the time well provided for. Third class accommodation was situated fore and aft on the lower decks. As was the case aboard all White Star vessels, third class spaces were segregated with single men berthed forward, and single women, married couples and families with children berthed aft. The third class passengers were provided with baths, a smoking room, some family rooms, and the third class spaces were ventilated with mechanical ventilation.

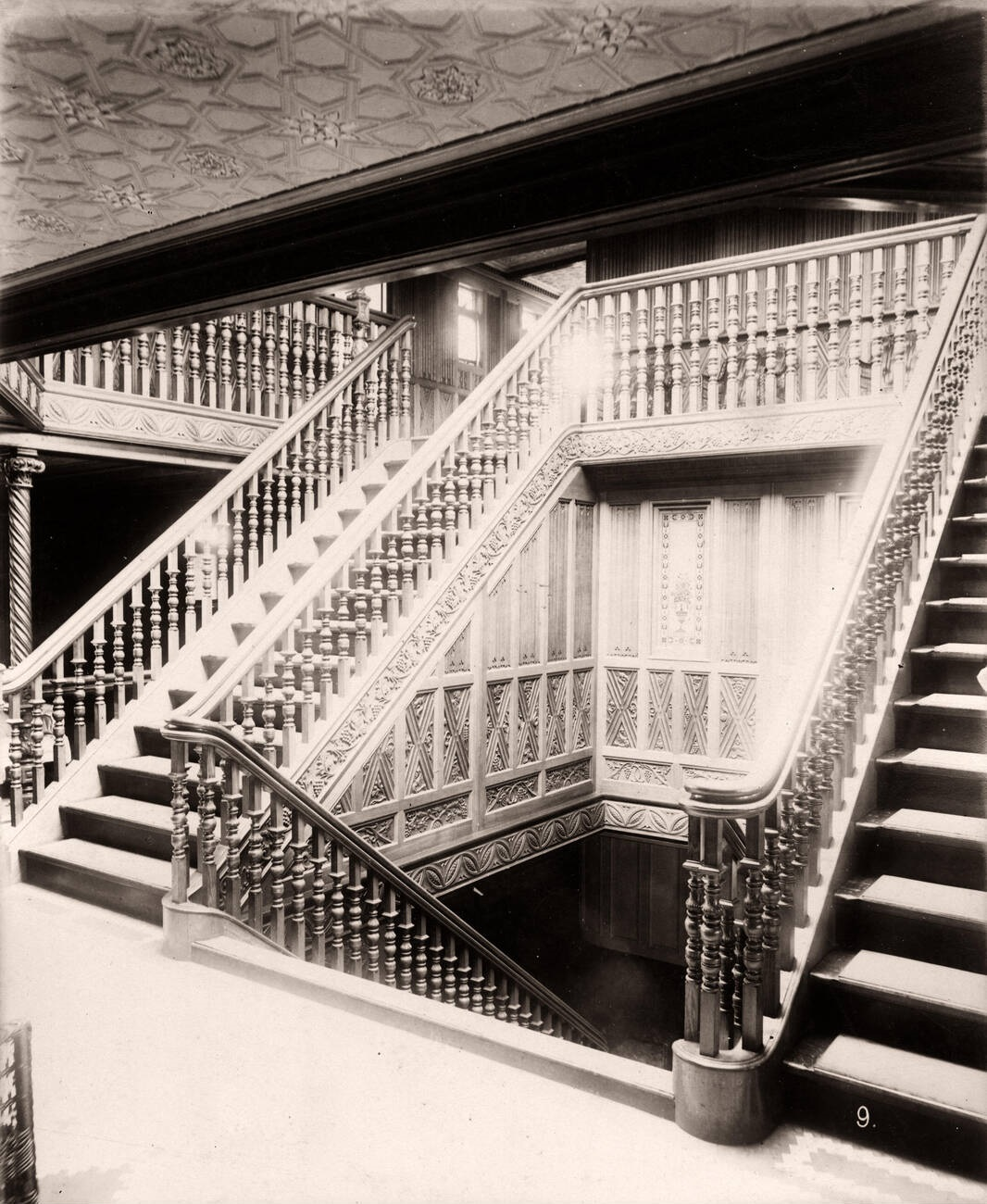
Staircase on Teutonic

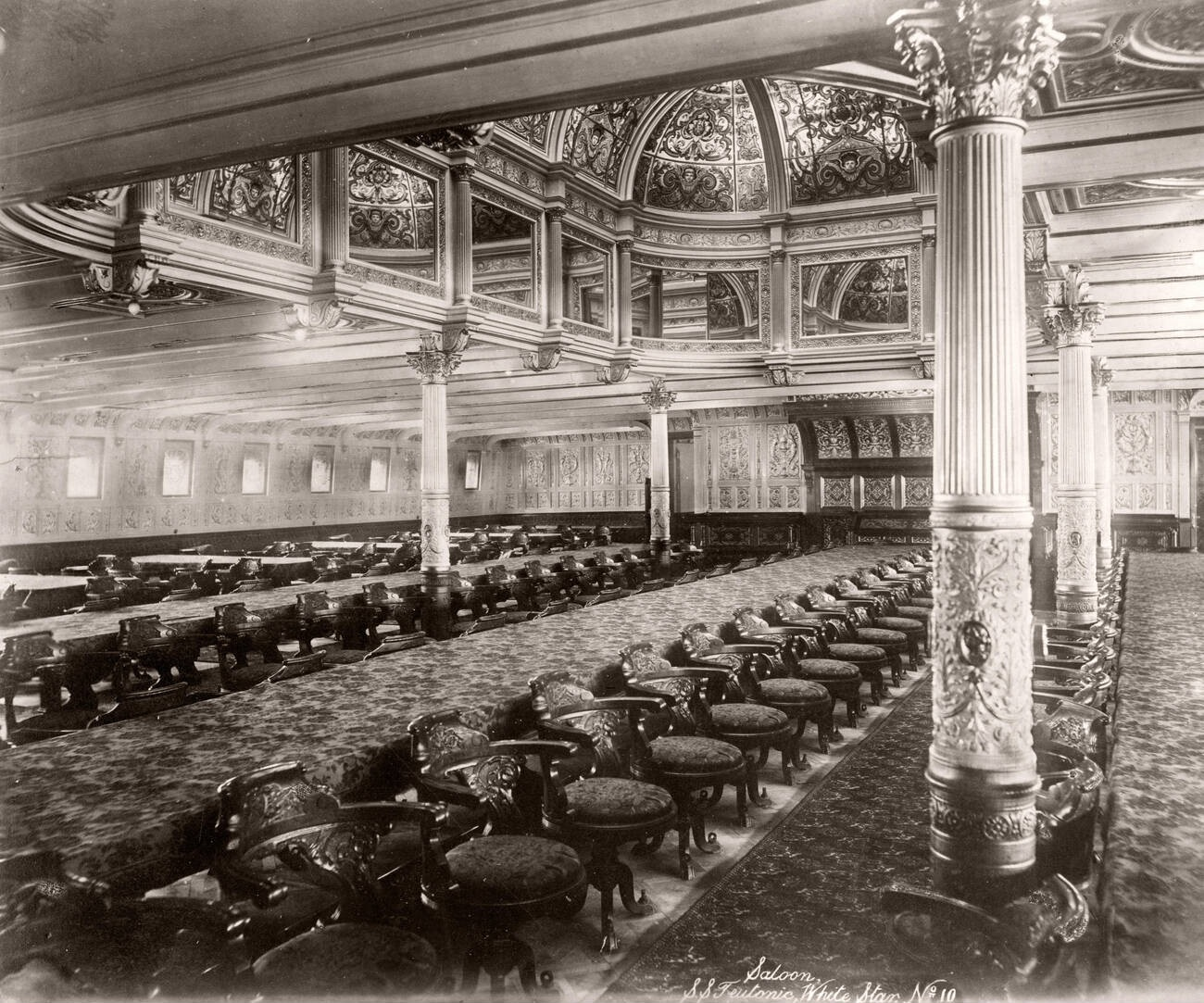
Saloon on Teutonic

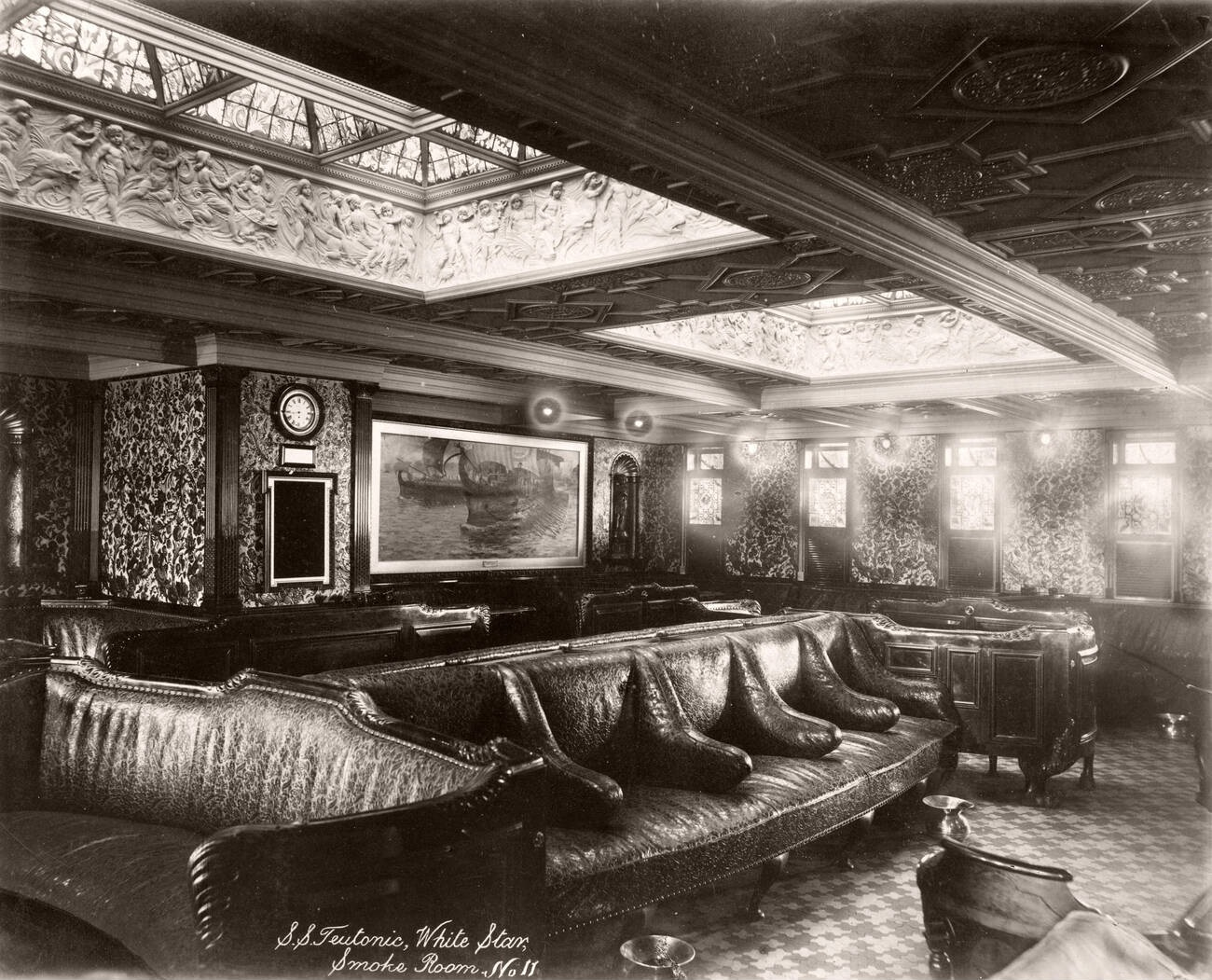
Smoke Room on Teutonic

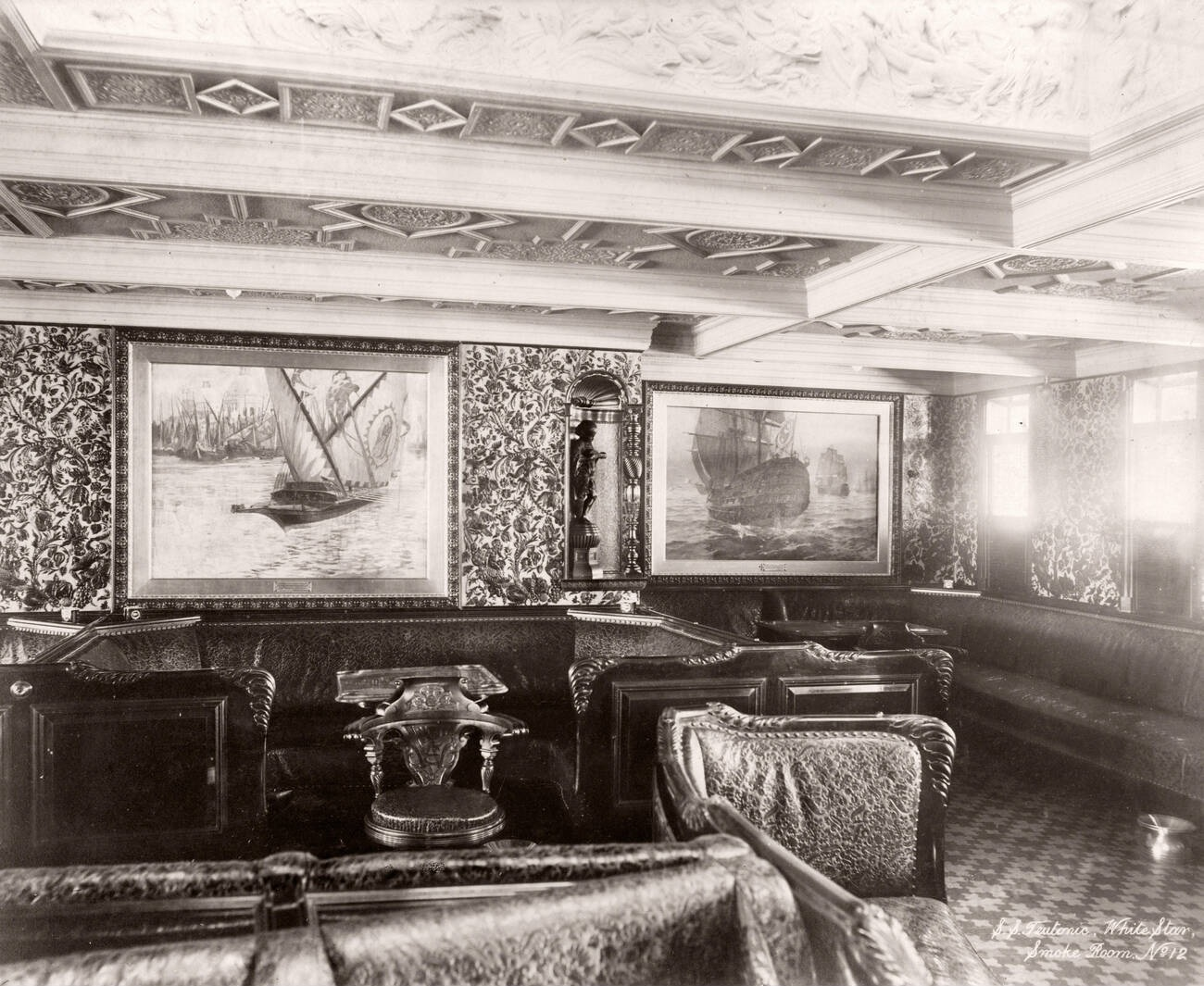
Smoke Room on Teutonic

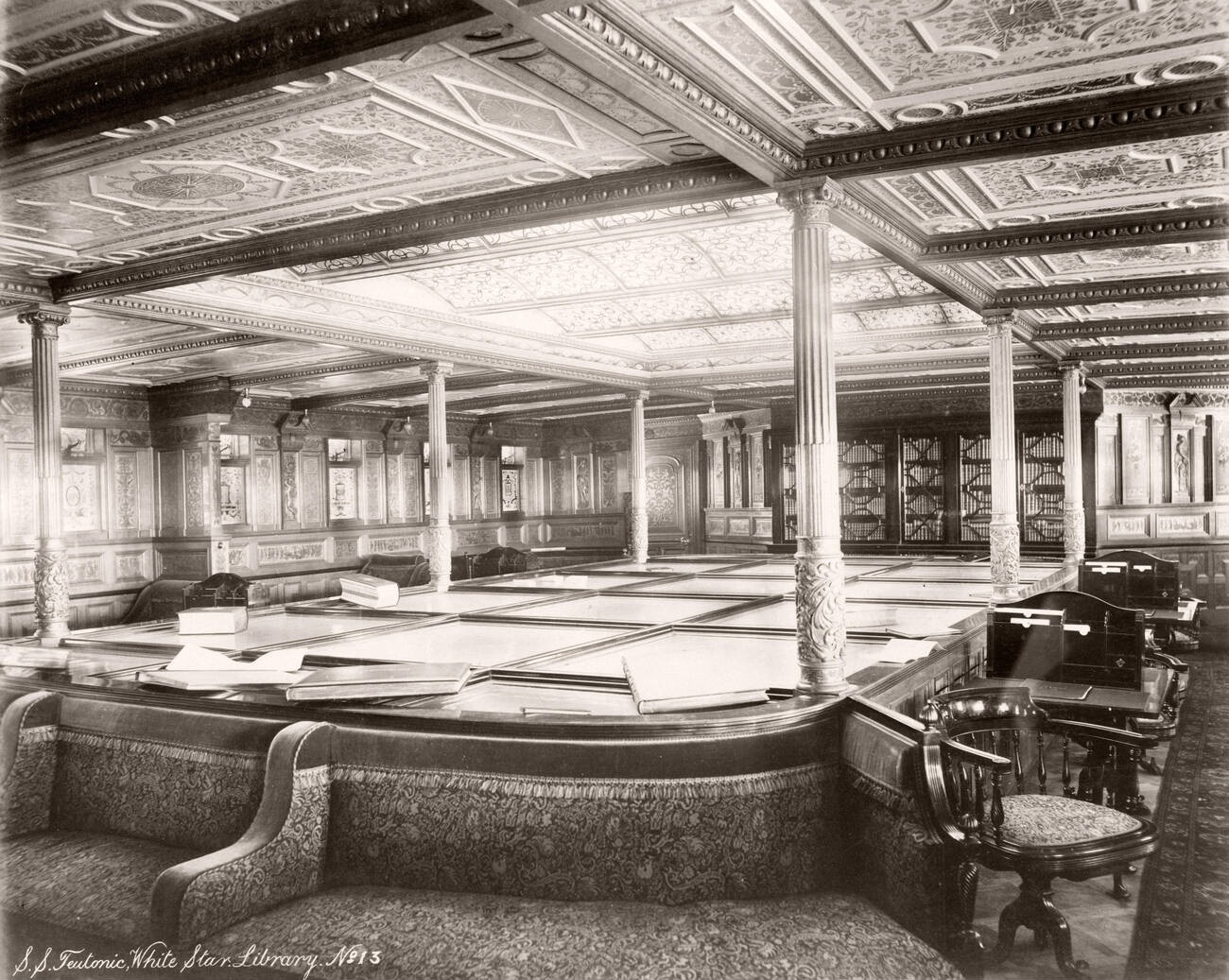
Library on Teutonic

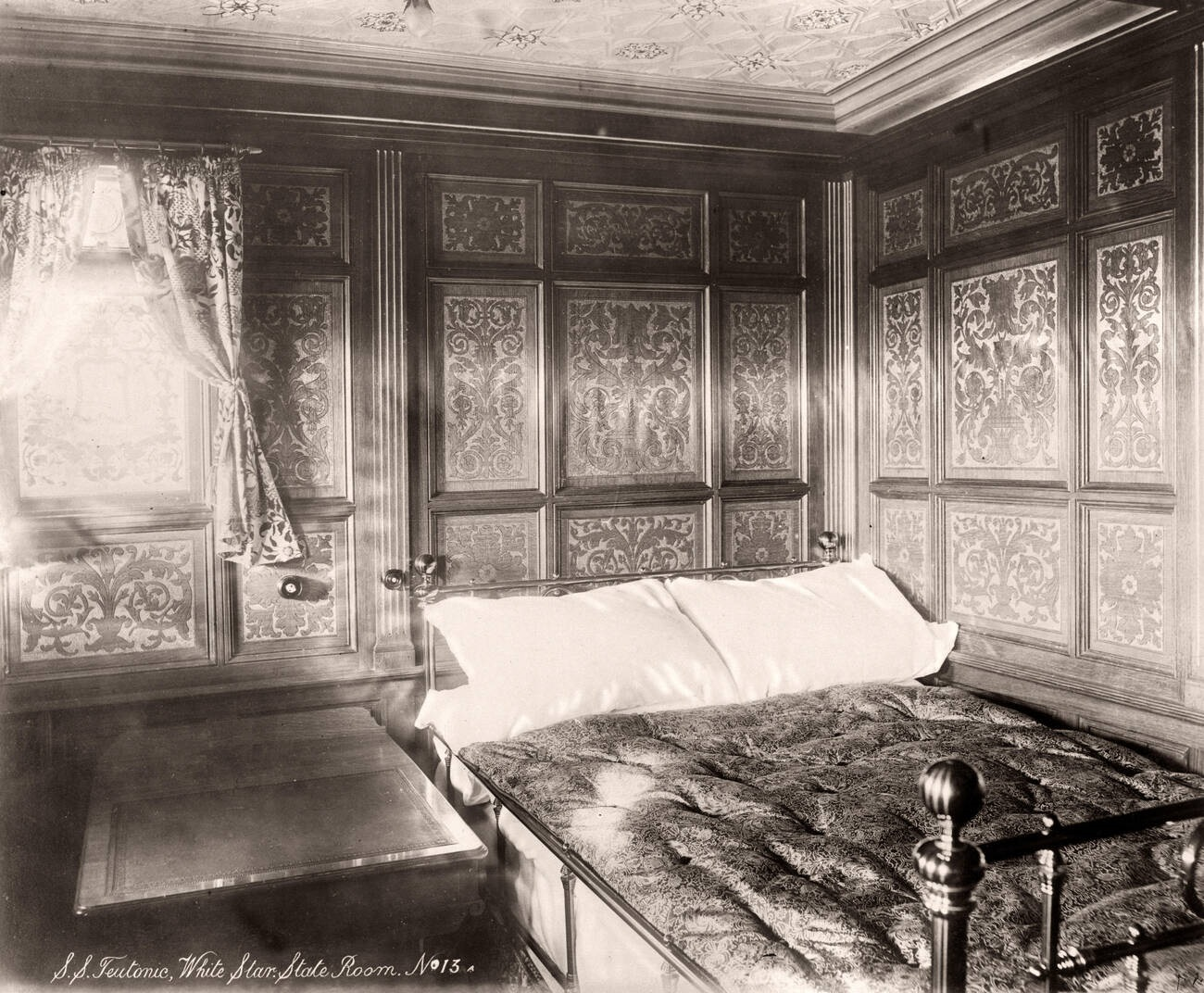
State Room on Teutonic

=== Career ===
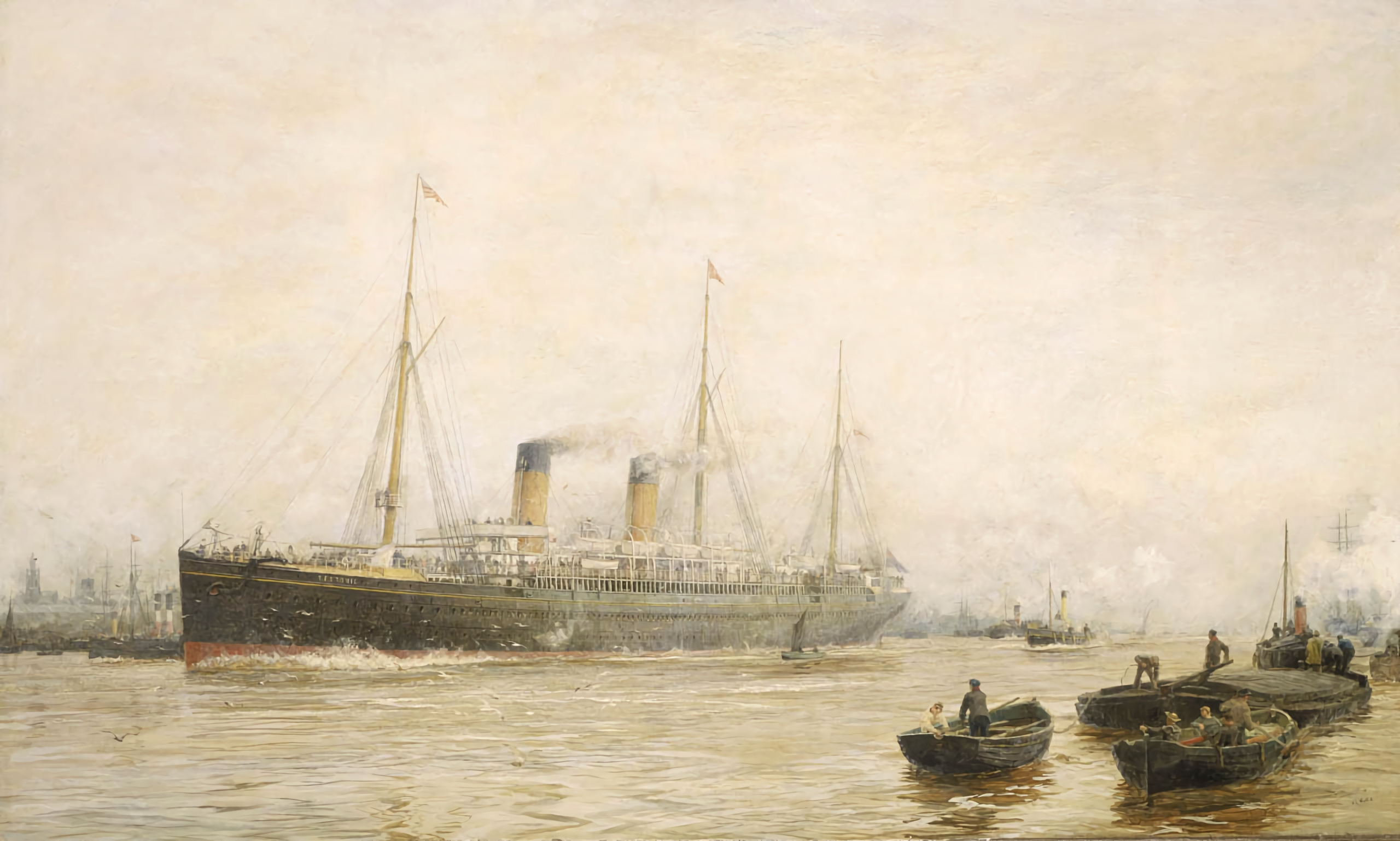
Illustration of RMS Teutonic of the White Star Line, the inspiration for the future "Four Flyers" of the Norddeutscher Lloyd.

When Teutonic was launched on 19 January 1889, she was the first White Star ship without square rigged sails. The ship was completed on 25 July 1889 and participated in the Spithead Naval Review on 5 and 6 August, in conjunction with the state visit of Kaiser Wilhelm II. Although Queen Victoria remained aboard the royal yacht, the Kaiser was given a two-hour tour of the new ship hosted by the Prince of Wales, the future Edward VII. During the tour, Wilhelm is reputed to have turned to a subaltern and remarked: "We must have one of these ..." The Kaiser's reaction is generally credited as the impetus for the creation of Germany's four funnel liners known as the Kaiser Class. She sported eight 4.7-inch (120 mm) guns. These were removed after the military reviews.

On 7 August 1889, she left on her maiden voyage to New York City. In August 1891, Teutonic won the Blue Riband from her sister Majestic, with a timing of 5 days, 16 hours and 31 minutes between Queenstown and Sandy Hook, with an average speed of 20.35 knots (37.69 km/h; 23.42 mph), she would hold the title for one year before losing it to City of Paris. Teutonic would be the last White Star ship to hold the Blue Riband, as from then on the company focused on size and comfort over speed in its subsequent ships.

Teutonic became known for her rivalry with City of New York, and there were a series of well publicised races across the Atlantic between the two ships, which lasted for as long as both ships were on the front line.

In 1897 Teutonic reassumed her military role for a Naval review commemorating Queen Victoria's Diamond Jubilee. In 1898, she had a minor collision in New York Harbor with the United States Lines' Berlin, but neither ship suffered major damage.

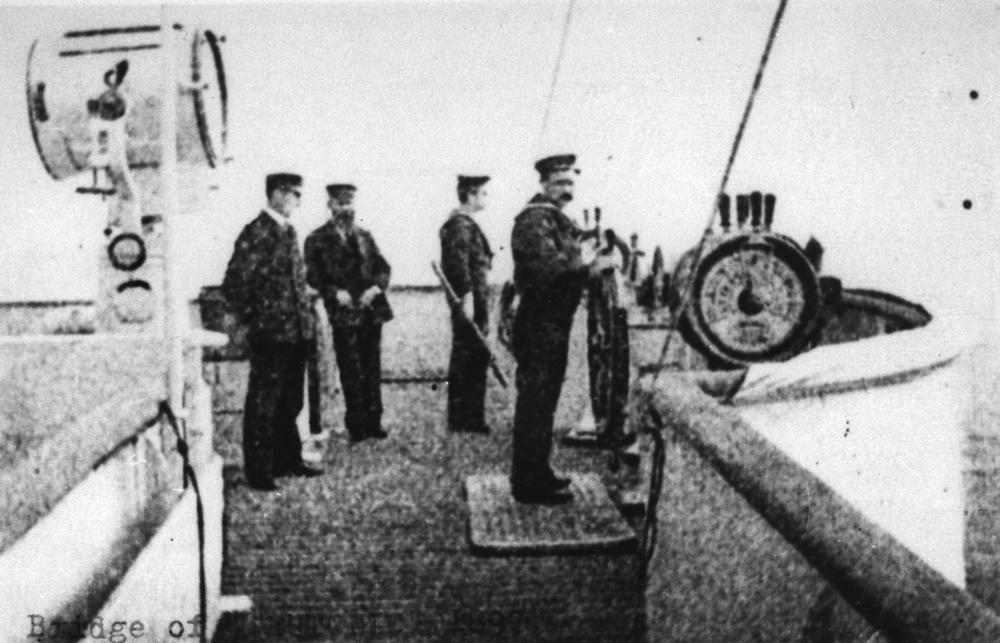
The bridge of Teutonic in 1897

Because of her Naval subsidy, in 1900, she served as a troop transport during the Boer War. In 1901, Teutonic encountered a tsunami, which washed two lookouts out of the crows nest who survived. The tsunami hit at night, so there were no passengers up on deck.

In 1907 Teutonic, along with Majestic, Oceanic and the new Adriatic was transferred to White Star's new 'Express Service' between Southampton and New York via Cherbourg and Queenstown. She made her first sailing on this route on 12 June that year.

In 1911, the now ageing Teutonic was replaced in the White Star lineup by the new Olympic. By the end of her career on White Star's UK-US services, she had carried a total of 209,466 passengers westbound and another 125,720 eastbound for a total of 335,186 passengers carried. She was transferred to White Star's sister company Dominion Line for a Canadian service, which ran from Liverpool, and terminated at Montreal in the summer season, and Portland, Maine in the winter. In order to prepare her for this service, she underwent a major refit at Belfast, in which her promenade decks were enclosed in order to protect passengers from the cold weather which could be expected on the route. Her accommodation was also extensively modified in order to carry 550 second class, and 1,000 third class passengers, with first class being discontinued.

In October 1913 the ship narrowly avoided the same fate as Titanic when, at 172 nautical miles (319 km) east of Belle Isle off the Newfoundland coast, she ran so close to an iceberg that she avoided collision only by reversing her engines and putting the helm hard aport. According to the 28 October 1913 issue of the Chicago Tribune, "the liner passed within twenty feet of the iceberg. The fog was so thick that even at that small distance the berg could scarcely be distinguished. It was so close that there was danger that the propeller of the ship would strike it as the vessel went around. The passengers were not aware of their peril until it had been averted. They signed a testimonial to the captain and his officers expressing their gratitude and admiration for the care and skill displayed by them."

==== War service and last years ====
In August 1914, with the start of World War I, Teutonic was requisitioned by the Royal Navy for use as an Armed Merchant Cruiser which she had been designed for. She was commissioned into the 10th Cruiser Squadron, where she took up position on the Northern Patrol between the Faroe Islands and the ice belt, and in the Denmark Strait between Iceland and Greenland. In 1916, she was bought outright by the Navy, and refitted with larger 6-inch (150 mm) guns. In 1917, she served as a White Sea convoy escort. The following year, she was used as a troopship, transporting soldiers between Britain and Alexandria in Egypt, with a capacity for 1,500 soldiers.

She continued to be used for transport duties by the Navy until early 1921, when she was sold to German shipbreakers, and scrapped at Emden.

Records
Preceded by Majestic	Holder of the Blue Riband (Westbound); 1891–1892	Succeeded by City of Paris
