= RMS Majestic (1889) =

White Star Line steamship

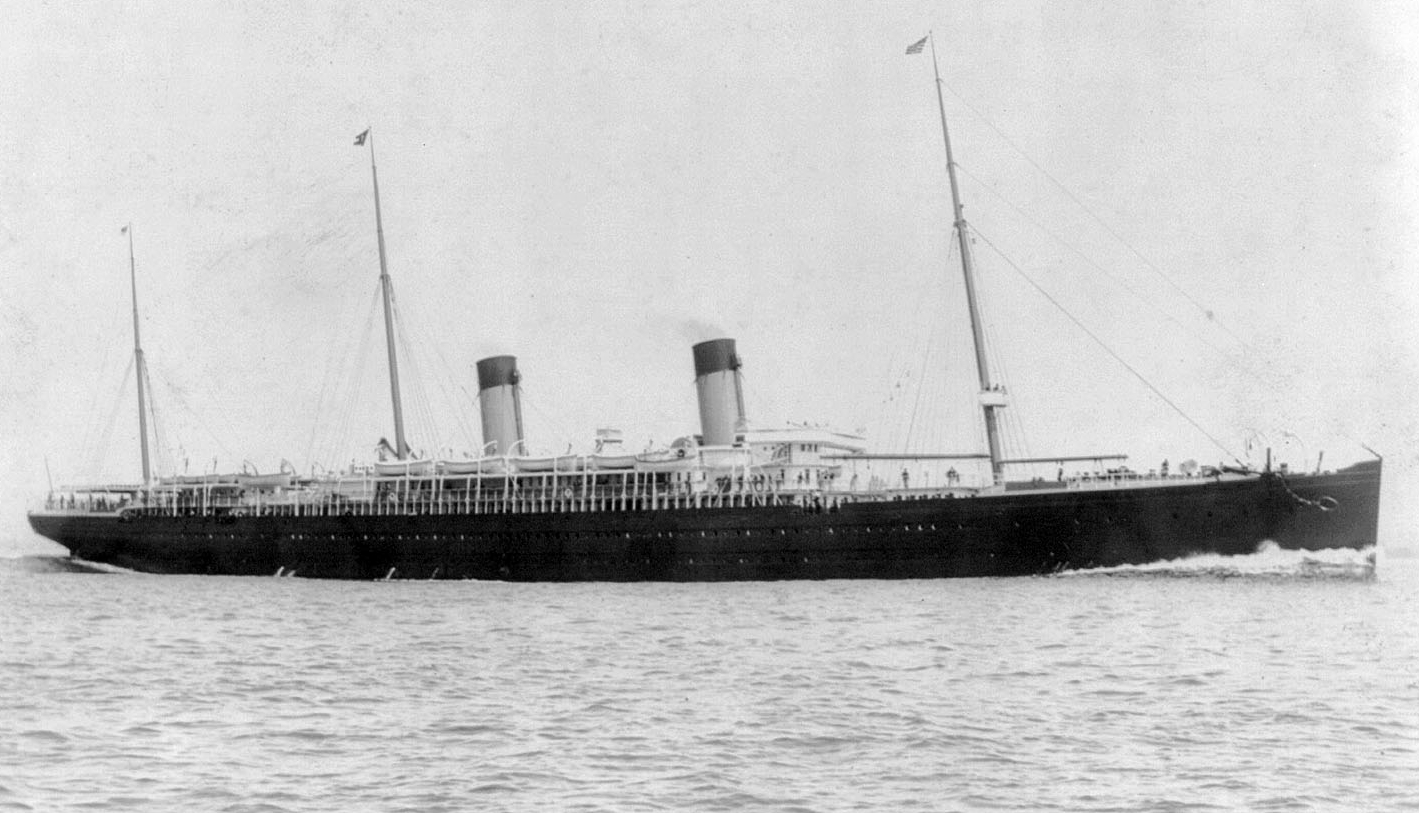
- Majestic in 1896

History

United Kingdom
- Name: RMS Majestic
- Owner: White Star Line
- Operator: White Star Line
- Port of registry: Liverpool, United Kingdom
- Route: Liverpool–Queenstown–New York (1890–1907); Southampton-Cherbourg-New York (1907–1914)
- Builder: Harland & Wolff, Belfast
- Yard number: 209
- Launched: 29 June 1889
- Completed: 22 March 1890
- Maiden voyage: 2 April 1890
- Fate: Scrapped; commenced 5 May 1914

General characteristics
- Class & type: Teutonic-class ocean liner
- Tonnage: 9,965 GRT, 4,270 NRT (1890); 10,147 GRT, 4,443 NRT (1903)
- Length: 582 ft (177 m)
- Beam: 57.7 ft (17.6 m)
- Propulsion: 2 × triple expansion engines; 2 × propellers
- Speed: 20–23 knots (37–43 km/h; 23–26 mph)
- Capacity: 1,490 passengers: 300 First Class; 190 Second Class; 1,000 Third Class

RMS Majestic was an ocean liner which entered service in 1890 and was operated by the White Star Line. She was the sister ship of RMS Teutonic. Majestic and her sister were the flagships of White Star Line's fleet for around a decade, until Oceanic entered service in 1899. Her career spanning 24 years ended when she was scrapped in 1914.

== Background ==
Constructed by Harland & Wolff, Majestic was launched on 29 June 1889 and was delivered to White Star Line in March 1890. White Star had sought to fund the construction of both Majestic and her sister Teutonic through the British government, a proposal which was accepted with the stipulation that the Royal Navy would have access to the two liners in a time of war as armed merchant cruisers. Majestic and her sister were the first new additions to White Star's transatlantic fleet since Britannic and Germanic had respectively entered service in 1874 and 1875. Majestic replaced the ageing Republic, which had been in service with White Star since 1872 and was subsequently sold to new owners. The pair were designed to be capable of an average Atlantic crossing speed of 20 knots (37 km/h; 23 mph), allowing White Star to compete with a new generation of mainly rival British liners which had entered service in the 1880s, such as the Cunard Line's Umbria and Etruria, and the Inman Line's duo of City of New York and City of Paris.

Teutonic and Majestic were the first White Star liners to have two engines, and two propellers, which allowed them to dispense with the auxiliary sails which had been required on earlier single-screw liners. They were powered by two triple expansion steam engines, which together produced 17,000 indicated horsepower (13,000 kW).

== Career ==
On 2 April 1890, Majestic left Liverpool on her maiden voyage to New York City. There was a strong desire among the White Star management to regain the coveted Blue Riband. Majestic eventually achieved this goal on a westbound voyage in July 1891, achieving a timing of 5 days, 18 hours and 8 minutes, between Queenstown and Sandy Hook, with an average speed of 20.1 knots (37.2 km/h; 23.1 mph). Majestic held the honour for a mere two weeks however, as her sister Teutonic soon won the title from her.

On one journey in 1894, Majestic attracted attention, when she raced against her rival City of Paris from New York to the English Channel. The race ended in a tie, with no clear winner.

In 1895, Majestic was assigned Captain Edward Smith, who served as her captain for nine years. When the Boer War started in 1899, Smith and Majestic were called upon to transport troops to Cape Colony. Two trips were made to South Africa, one in December 1899 and one in February 1900, both without incident. Charles Lightoller served as a deck officer under Smith during this period.

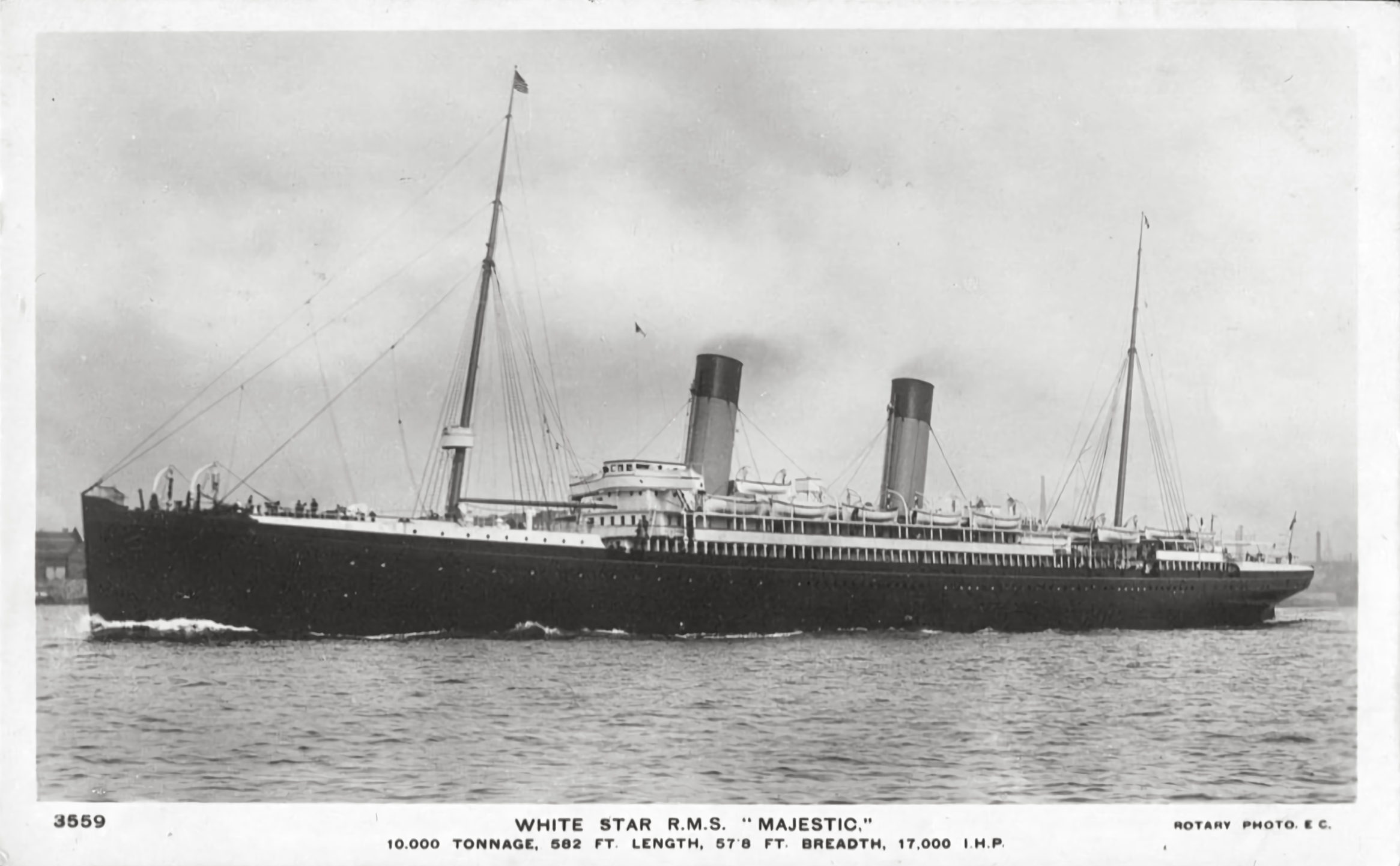
Postcard of Majestic, after her 1902 refit

In 1902–1903, the ship underwent a refit, which included updates to much of her passenger accommodations, new boilers and taller twin funnels, and increasing her tonnage to 10,147 gross register tons (GRT). After her refit was completed, she returned to the Liverpool-New York run. Smith left as captain in 1904 to take command of the new Baltic, then the largest ship in the world. In 1905, Majestic suffered a fire in her bunker, but the damage was not significant. In 1907, White Star inaugurated a new express service from Southampton to New York via Cherbourg and Queenstown, to which Majestic, along with Teutonic, Oceanic and the newly completed Adriatic were transferred. Majestic departed Southampton for the first time on 26 June.

In January 1908, Majestic suffered a major fire whilst in port at Southampton, which gutted her smoking room and several cabins before being extinguished.

In November 1911, Majestic was removed from regular service and became White Star's reserve vessel; kept laid up at Birkenhead on standby, ready to stand in for any other ship which was out of service for any reason. When the Titanic disaster occurred the following April, Majestic was reactivated in order to maintain Titanic's service.

On 17 October 1913, she came to the rescue of the French schooner Garonne, which had wrecked. On 14 January 1914, Majestic departed on her last Atlantic crossing. By this point she had been in service for nearly 24 years, during which time she had carried a total of 163,363 passengers westbound, and another 113,524 passengers eastbound, for a total of 276,887 passengers carried. In May 1914, she was sold for scrap to the Thos. W. Ward yard at Morecambe for £25,000. Before scrapping of the ship commenced, the scrapping company opened the ship for public tours. Majestic was sold for scrap just three months before the outbreak of World War I, and questions were asked about whether the sale had been premature, however by the time the conflict was underway, demolition of Majestic was well advanced.

== See also ==
- RMS Majestic (1914)

Records
Preceded by City of Paris	Holder of the Blue Riband (Westbound); 1891	Succeeded by Teutonic
