= List of ships named Harvard =

A number of American ships have been named Harvard, including:

== Merchant ships ==
- SS Harvard (1900), a bulk carrier built in 1900 for the Pittsburgh Steamship Company
- SS Harvard (1907), a coastal passenger ship, which also served as troopship USS Charles
- SS Harvard (1926), a steam trawler, later converted to the fishery research vessel Albatross III
- MV Harvard (1938), a diesel trawler, which also as served as the Q-ship USS Captor

and also

- SS Harvard Victory, a VC2-S-AP1 standard Victory Ship, built in 1945. Launched as the first of a new series of U.S. Maritime Commission ships named after U.S. educational institutions, The Harvard Corporation later voted to give the ship a library of about 140 volumes selected by the American Merchant Marine Library Association.
- SS John Harvard, a EC2-S-C1 standard Liberty Ship built in 1942.

== Naval ships ==
- USS Harvard (1888), an auxiliary cruiser purchased for use in the Spanish–American War and in commission during 1898
- USS Harvard (ID-1298), a troop transport acquired in April 1918 that was renamed USS Charles two days after commissioning, then was again renamed USS Harvard in July 1920 before being sold in October 1920
- USS Harvard (SP-209), a leased yacht in commission as a patrol boat from 1917 to 1919
