= USS Harvard =

Four United States Navy ships have been named USS Harvard, after Harvard University:

- USS Harvard (1888), was an auxiliary cruiser purchased for use in the Spanish–American War and in commission during 1898
- USS Harvard (ID-1298), a troop transport acquired in April 1918 that was renamed USS Charles two days after commissioning, then was renamed USS Harvard in July 1920 before being sold in October 1920
- USS Harvard (SP-209), was a leased yacht in commission as a patrol boat from 1917 to 1919
- USS Harvard 1945 - At the Kaiser Shipyard in Richmond, California, the 10,800-ton SS Harvard Victory was launched as the first of a new series of U.S. Maritime Commission ships named after U.S. educational institutions. The Harvard Corporation later voted to give the ship a library of about 140 volumes selected by the American Merchant Marine Library Association. A simple plaque acknowledged the University's gift.
