= SS City of New York (1888) =

British-built passenger liner

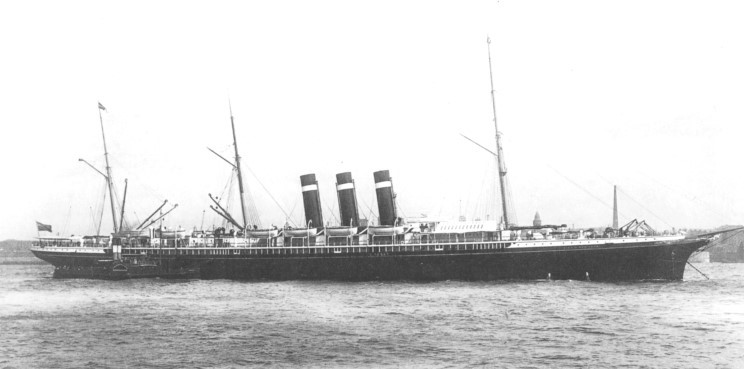
- The ship as City of New York

History

United Kingdom
- Name: City of New York
- Namesake: New York City
- Owner: Inman Line (later International Navigation Company)
- Port of registry: Liverpool
- Route: Transatlantic crossing
- Builder: J & G Thomson, Clydebank
- Yard number: 240
- Launched: 15 March 1888
- Completed: July 1888
- Maiden voyage: 1 August 1888
- Identification: UK official number 93793; code letters KTDM
- Fate: Sold to American Line, 1893

United States
- Name: New York
- Namesake: New York City
- Owner: American Line (1893–1920); US Navy (1898 and 1918)
- Port of registry: New York
- Route: Transtlantic crossing
- Renamed: USS Harvard (1898); USS Plattsburg (1918); New York (1920)
- Identification: US official number 130616; code letters KLPB; by 1913: wireless call sign KSN
- Fate: Scrapped at Genoa, Italy in 1923

General characteristics
- Type: ocean liner
- Tonnage: 10,508 GRT, 5,589 NRT
- Displacement: 17,270 tons (17,550 tonnes)
- Length: 560 ft (170 m)
- Beam: 63.2 ft (19.3 m)
- Depth: 39.2 ft (11.9 m)
- Decks: 4
- Installed power: 2,747 NHP; 18,000 hp (20,880 kW)
- Propulsion: 2 × triple-expansion engines; 2 × screw propellers
- Speed: 20 knots (37 km/h)
- Capacity: As designed 500 first class, 200 second class, ~1,000 steerage passengers
- Crew: 362

City of New York was a British built passenger liner that was designed to be the largest and fastest liner on the Atlantic. When she entered service with the Inman Line in August 1888, she was the first twin screw express liner in the world, and while she did not achieve the westbound Blue Riband, she ultimately held the eastbound record from August 1892 to May 1893 at a speed of 20.11 knots (37.24 km/h). City of New York and her sister City of Paris are considered especially beautiful ships, and throughout their careers were considered rivals to White Star Line's Teutonic and Majestic.

In February 1893, the Inman Line was merged into the American Line and, by act of Congress, the renamed New York was transferred to the US flag. Beginning in the mid-1890s, New York and Paris were paired with St Louis and St Paul to form one of the premier Atlantic services. New York continued with the American Line until 1920 and was broken for scrap in 1923. She served in the United States Navy as USS Harvard during the Spanish–American War, and Plattsburg in World War I. The liner is also remembered for nearly colliding with RMS Titanic as the latter ship departed on her ill-fated maiden voyage in April 1912.

== Development and design ==
When International Navigation Company purchased the Inman Line in 1886, the fleet needed new units to revive the line's fortunes against the Cunard Line and White Star. International Navigation's vice president, Clement Griscom, immediately sailed to Liverpool with a commitment from the Pennsylvania Railroad to provide $2 million in capital towards the building of a new ship. Shipbuilders in Scotland were experiencing a recession at the time and offered to deliver two ships at $1,850,000 per unit. The Pennsylvania Railroad agreed to underwrite the additional capital and the contracts were signed for City of New York and her sister, City of Paris.

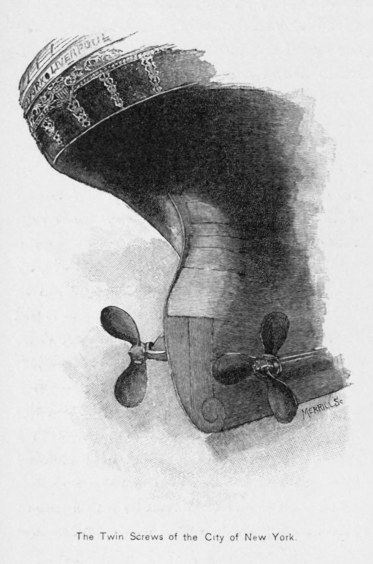
Detail of twin screws

When designing the new liners, the lessons of the City of Rome fiasco were recalled. The original design called two ships of 8,500 GRT that were only slightly bigger than City of Rome, but with steel hulls and twin screws. Because powerful single screw liners were prone to shaft failure, they carried extensive rigging for sails. Twin screws rendered this extra rigging unnecessary. Starting in 1866, a few twin screw ships sailed the Atlantic, but the new Inman ships were the first twin screw express liners.

While size was increased by almost 25% to 10,500 GRT in the final design, the plan retained City of Rome's classic clipper bow and three raked funnels. City of New York even had a figurehead of a female figure carved by sculptor James Allan. To address the vibration problems of most liners of the period, the new Inman liners were given a ratio of length to beam of 8.3 to 1 as compared to the then common ratio of 10 to 1. The hull was more extensively subdivided than previously attempted. The ships were equipped with a full double bottom and 15 transverse bulkheads that reached the saloon deck. They also received a fore-aft bulkhead over their entire length. Each ship had two triple expansion engines, of 9,000 indicated horsepower each that were placed in separate compartments. While the engines for the sisters were identical, City of Paris produced 1,500 more horsepower than City of New York.

City of New York was designed for 540 first, 200 second and 1,000 steerage passengers. Her quarters were fitted with running hot and cold water, electric ventilation, and electric lighting. Her first class public rooms, such as library and smoking room, were fitted with walnut panels and her dining saloon came with a massive dome that provided a natural light to the passengers.

== Service history ==
=== 1888–1898 ===
On March 15, 1888, City of New York was christened by Lady Randolph Churchill. On August 1, she commenced her maiden voyage from Liverpool to New York City where she arrived on August 10. Among the prominent passengers on board for her first crossing was noted American politician and statesman James G. Blaine. Unfortunately, while achieving respectable crossings, she was unable to produce records. Her sister, City of Paris entered service in April 1889 and took the westbound Blue Riband a month later. That August, White Star commissioned the twin screw Teutonic followed the next year by Majestic and the Inman and White Star pairs took turns bettering each other's times. While City of Paris proved to be the fastest of the four, in 1892 City of New York was finally able to outrun her sister for the eastbound record.

On 21 August 1890, the liners Teutonic and City of New York raced from the New York pier to the Sandy Hook bar out to the bay. Hundreds of people were present to observe the famous liners as they departed. After seeing the vessels safely outside the bay, the pilots were taken off by the pilot boat Lillie, No. 8. Henderson said Teutonic crossed the bar at 9:42 AM. McEnenerny said City of New York crossed at 10:20 AM. Teutonic went at the rate of 17 knots (31 km/h; 20 mph). It was expected that the vessels would be in sight of each other for two to three days.

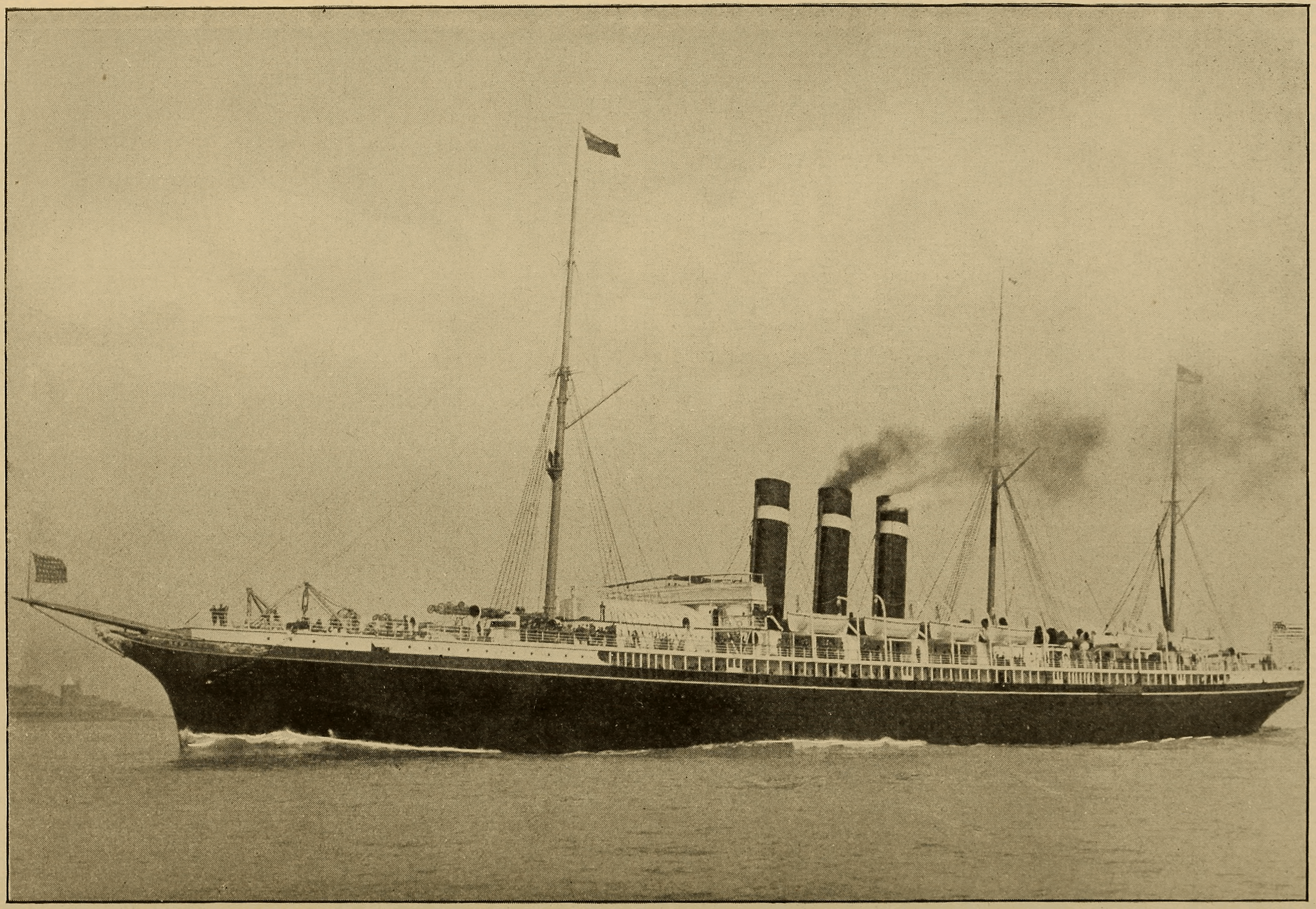
New York under the US flag, c. 1895

It had been International Navigation's plan to maintain Inman's status as a British flag carrier. However, even before City of New York was completed, the British Government responded to Inman's ownership change by revoking the line's mail contract. International Navigation lobbied the US Congress to replace the subsidy and allow the Inman speedsters to register in the US despite the law that only permitted US-built ships to be registered there. After considerable controversy, Congress enacted the subsidy provided that International Navigation build two similar ships in the US and all four twin-screw liners being available to the government in the event of a crisis. In one of his last acts in office, on February 22, 1893, President Benjamin Harrison boarded the now renamed New York during a snowstorm and raised the American Flag. The Inman Line was merged into International Navigation's American Line. As a part of the change, the former Inman liners now used Southampton as their UK destination rather than Liverpool, ending their direct rivalry with the White Star pair until 1907 when Teutonic and Majestic were also transferred to Southampton.

On 29 February 1896 New York grounded in fog in Lower New York Bay. She was refloated the next day.

=== Spanish–American War ===
At the outbreak of the Spanish–American War, City of New York was chartered as an auxiliary cruiser with a civilian crew, commissioning on 26 April 1898 at New York, Captain C. S. Cotton in command and renamed Harvard. Assigned as a scout, Harvard departed New York on 30 April to cruise West Indian waters in search of the Spanish fleet. After sending back several reports on the location of Spanish units in the Caribbean, Harvard was blockaded by a larger force at Saint-Pierre, Martinique from 11 to 17 May, after which she proceeded to Santiago de Cuba and St. Nicholas Mole, Haiti, with dispatches from Commodore Winfield Scott Schley. Interrupting her scouting duties, Harvard returned to Newport News, Virginia, 7–26 June during which time her crew was officially taken into the Naval Service.

Harvard returned to the Caribbean with troops and supplies, arriving at Altares, Cuba, about 1 July. After Rear Admiral William T. Sampson's victory at the victory off Santiago, she rescued survivors. Despite the high surf and ammunition explosions from the stricken Spanish ships, Harvard succeeded in recovering over 600 officers and men.

On 4 July 1898, the 9th Massachusetts Volunteer Infantry were guarding the prisoners of war inside Harvard. A guard ordered a prisoner, who was attempting to cross the line, to return. The prisoner did not understand English and the guard fired a shot causing other prisoners to stand up. Fearing the prisoners were about to attack, the guards opened fire, killing six prisoners and wounding thirteen more. After the investigation, it was concluded that it was a mistake. The tragedy was known as "Harvard Incident".

No longer needed as a scout in the Caribbean, Harvard was sent back to the United States 10 July 1898. She was temporarily turned over to the War Department, and returned to Santiago de Cuba to transport troops back to the United States. Harvard arrived at New York on 27 August and decommissioned 2 September 1898 at New York Navy Yard.

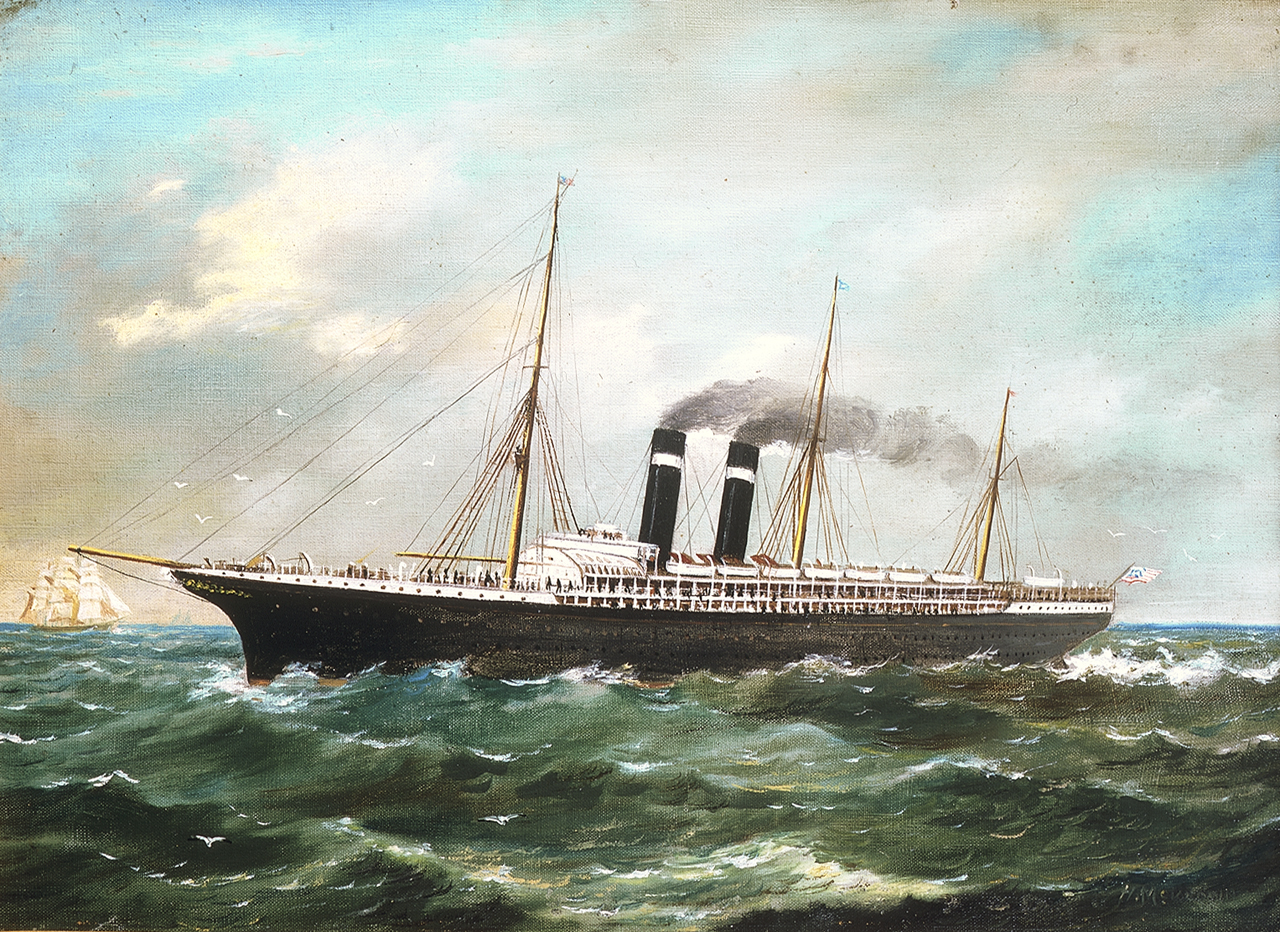
New York after her refit in 1901-1903

=== 1899–1917 ===
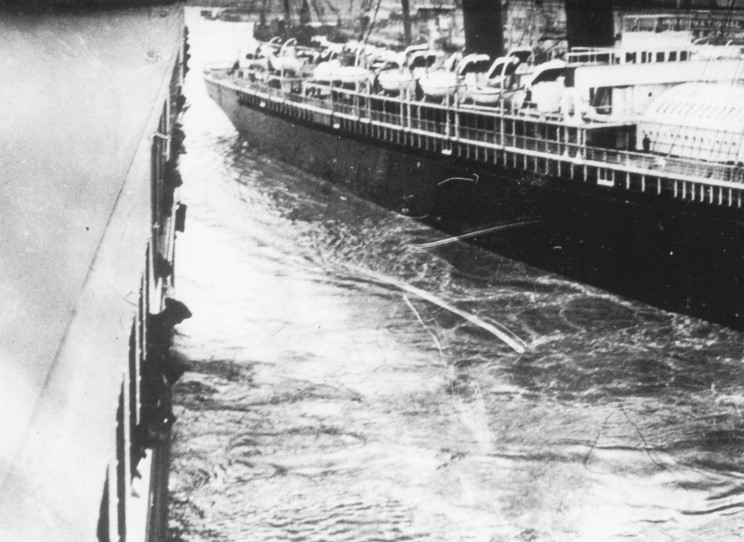
New York in her near collision with Titanic

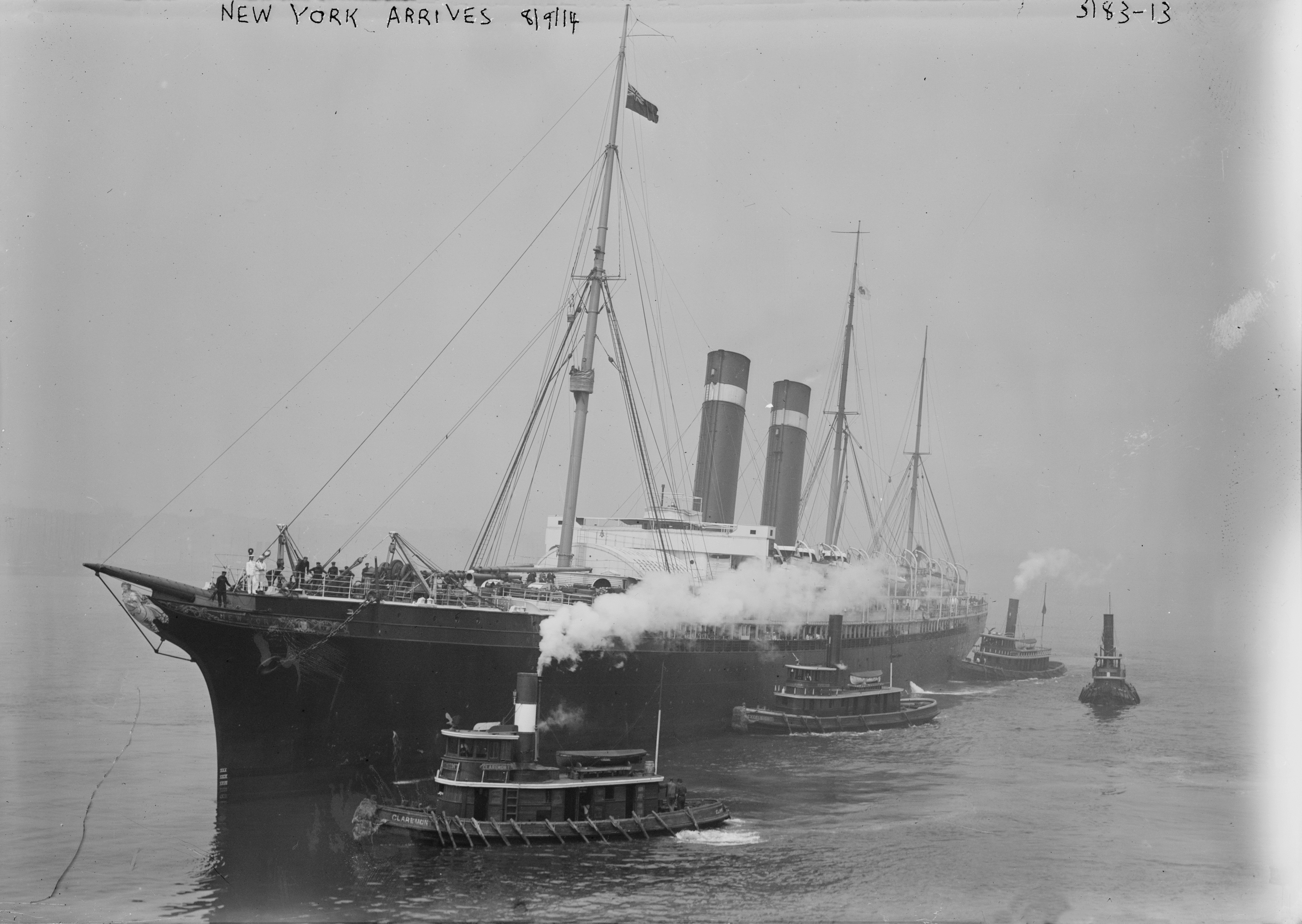
New York arriving in New York Aug 9, 1914 with passengers fleeing the outbreak of the Great War

New York resumed her civilian service on the New York–Southampton run in January 1899. During her first post-war crossing, one of her engines broke down and she had to return to Southampton for repairs lasting three months. In 1901, New York was taken out of service for an extensive refit that included replacing her machinery with quadruple expansion engines. Her good looks were partly spoiled when her three raked funnels were replaced with two taller ones. Her size increased to 10,798 gross register tons. She resumed service on 14 April 1903.

On 10 April 1912, New York was berthed in Southampton beside Oceanic. The three-inch steel hawsers that secured her were torn from their moorings when the much larger Titanic (leaving port to begin her ill-fated maiden voyage to New York City) passed by, creating a suction effect. A collision was narrowly avoided when Titanic's captain, Edward Smith, ordered the port propeller to reverse, turning the larger liner while the nearby tugboat Vulcan towed New York in the opposite direction.

In 1913, New York was re-configured as a second and third-class only liner.

At the beginning of World War I in 1914, the American Line reverted to Liverpool for their UK terminal. As a neutral-flagged liner, New York was very profitable until the United States entered the war.

=== World War I ===
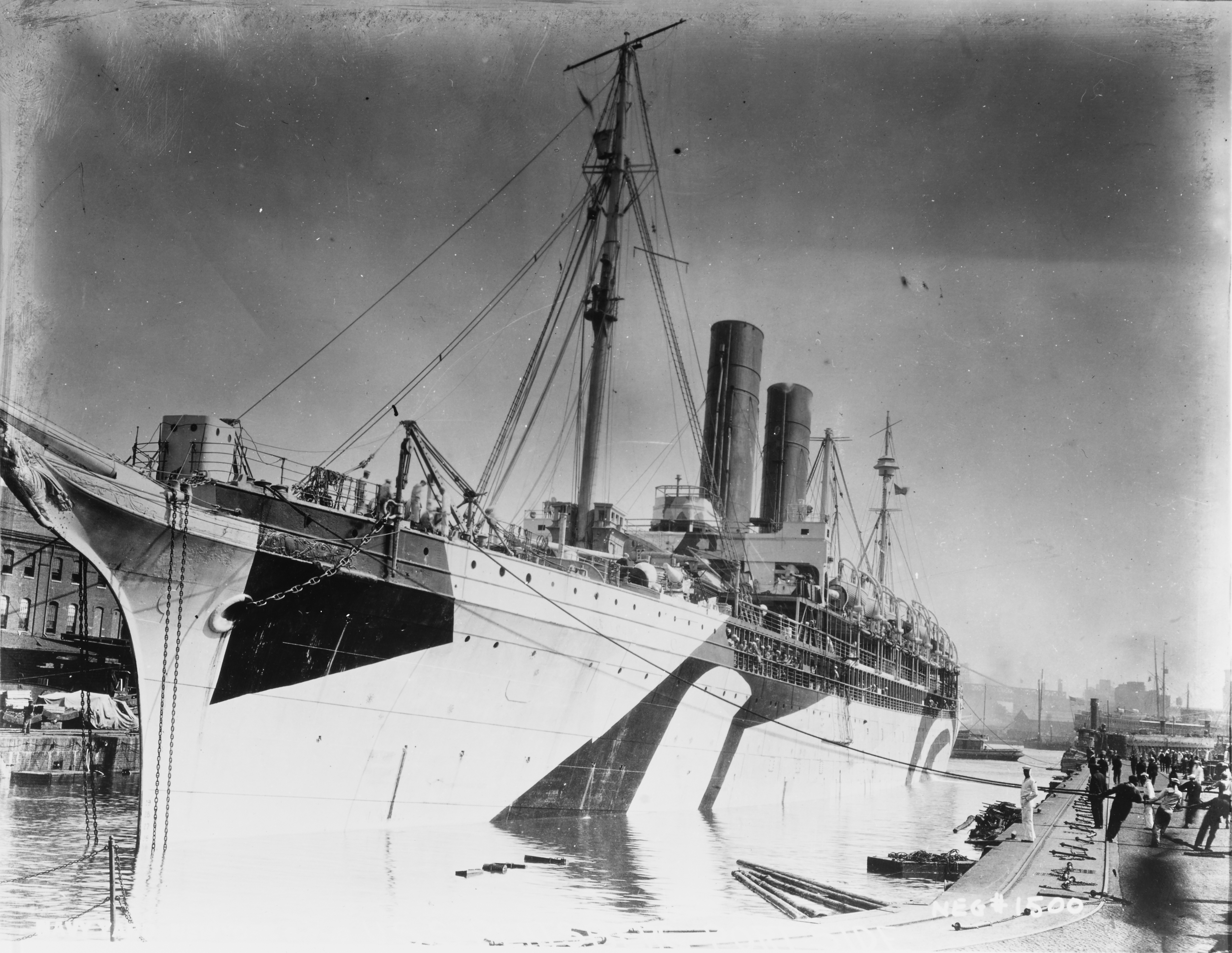
USS Plattsburg in New York Navy Yard, 7 June 1918

The United States entered World War I on 6 April 1917. New York was armed, and U.S. Navy gun crews were assigned to her.

On 16 January 1918, New York was in the Irish Sea during a voyage to Liverpool, England, escorted by the destroyers USS Jenkins and USS Shaw. As darkness fell at around 18:00, Jenkins took station astern of New York while Shaw continued to patrol ahead. At about 19:30, the gun crews manning New York′s forward guns sighted a suspicious object on her port beam, and they fired seven rounds at it. New York swung slightly to starboard, and the guns received orders to cease firing. Meanwhile, New York′s after gun crew sighted Jenkins on New York′s starboard quarter. Believing Jenkins still to be astern of New York and not realizing that New York′s swing to starboard had placed Jenkins on her starboard quarter, the after gun mistook Jenkins for a hostile vessel and fired one shot. It hit Jenkins, killing one man and wounding four. Jenkins immediately turned on her running lights, and New York ceased fire.

New York was chartered by the U.S. Navy from the International Mercantile Marine Company on 9 May 1918 and converted her into a troop transport. She was commissioned as USS Plattsburgh at New York City on 24 May 1918 and was assigned to the Cruiser and Transport Force.

Plattsburg departed New York in convoy with her first load of troops for Europe on 12 June 1918, arriving at Liverpool on 23 June and returning to New York on 11 July 1918. During her service, she was damaged by a mine in the River Mersey. She was returning from her fourth trip to Europe when World War I ended when the Armistice with Germany was signed on 11 November 1918, having transported a total of 8,776 troops.

Plattsburg made seven trips after the Armistice, returning a total of 24,330 American soldiers to the United States. Upon her arrival at New York from her last trip on 29 August 1919, she was transferred from the Cruiser and Transport Force to the 3rd Naval District. She was turned over to the United States Department of War on 6 October 1919 and returned to her owners on 7 October 1919.

=== 1920–1922 ===
The ship reverted to the name New York, and her post-World War I reconditioning included removal of a mast. She resumed passenger service in 1920 and remained with the American Line for nine months until she was sold to the Polish Navigation Company. After one voyage, her new owner went bankrupt and New York was seized by the creditors, who sold her to the Irish American Line in 1922. She was then sold to the United Transatlantic Line and again to the American Black Sea Line. Her last Atlantic crossing was on 10 June 1922 from New York to Naples and Constantinople. Later that year, she was sold for scrap.

== Gallery ==
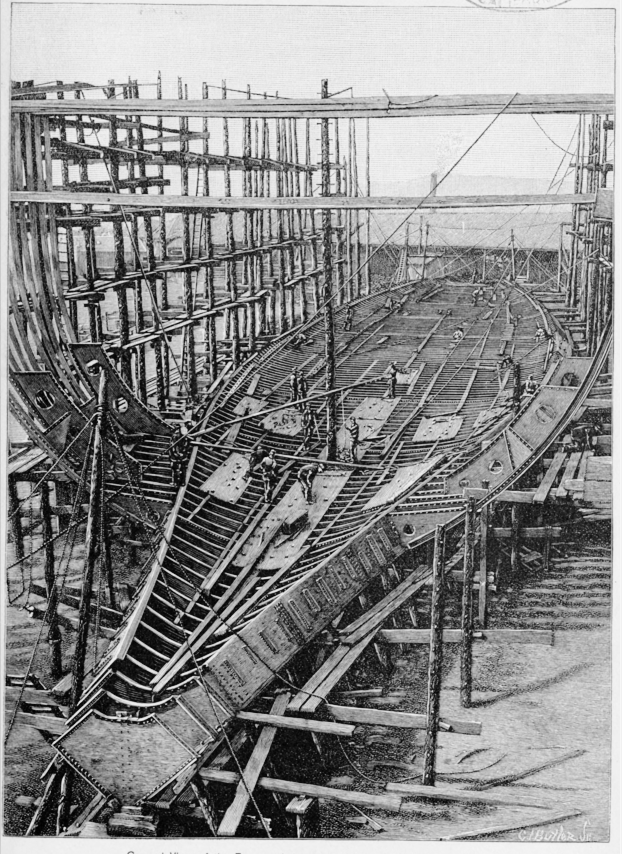
General view of the frames of City of New York. June 25, 1887

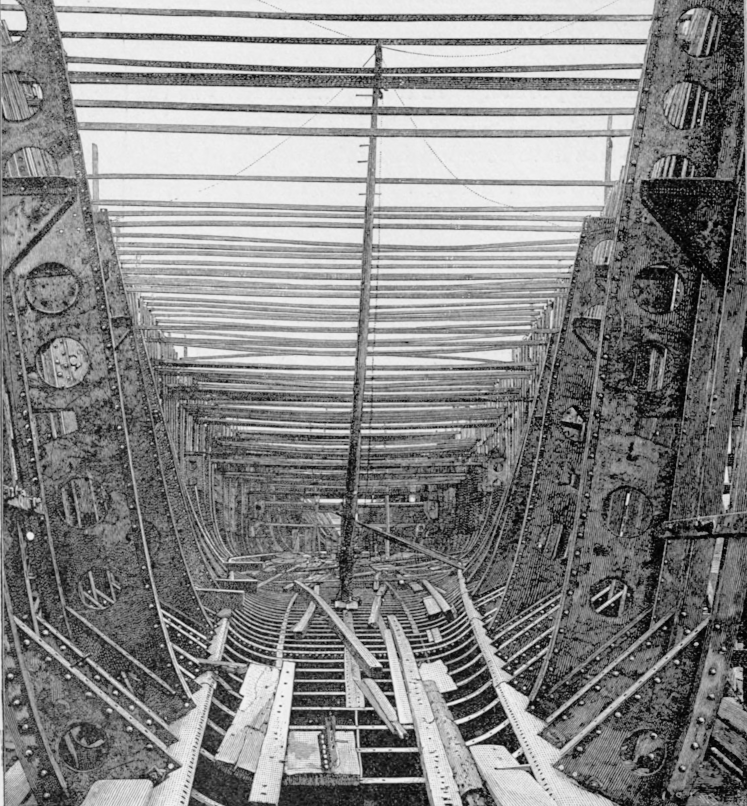
Frames of City of New York, looking aft. July 19, 1887

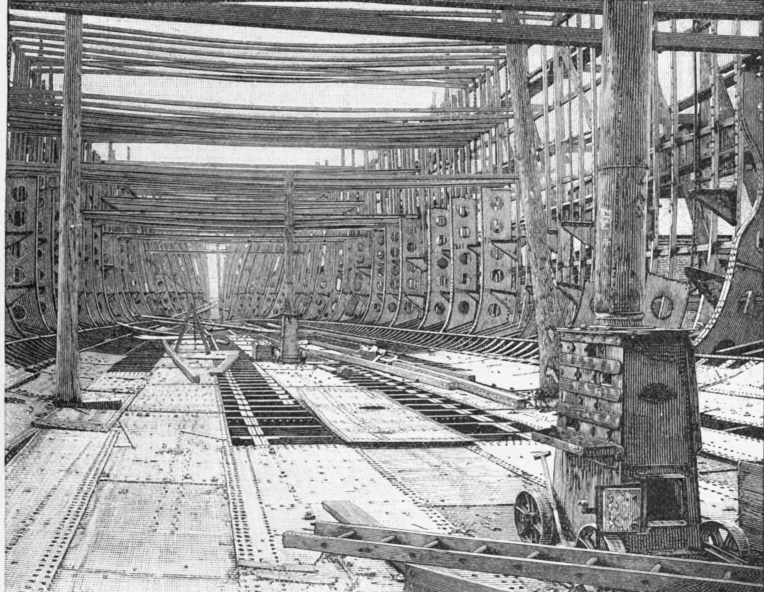
Frames of City of New York looking forward. July 19, 1887.

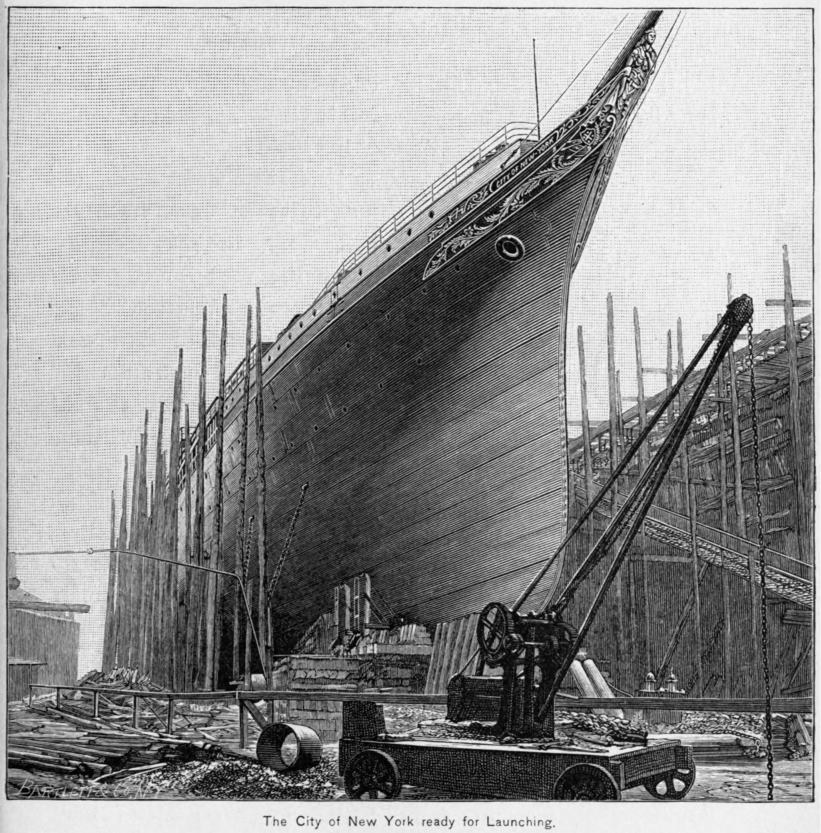
Bow view of City of New York before launching.

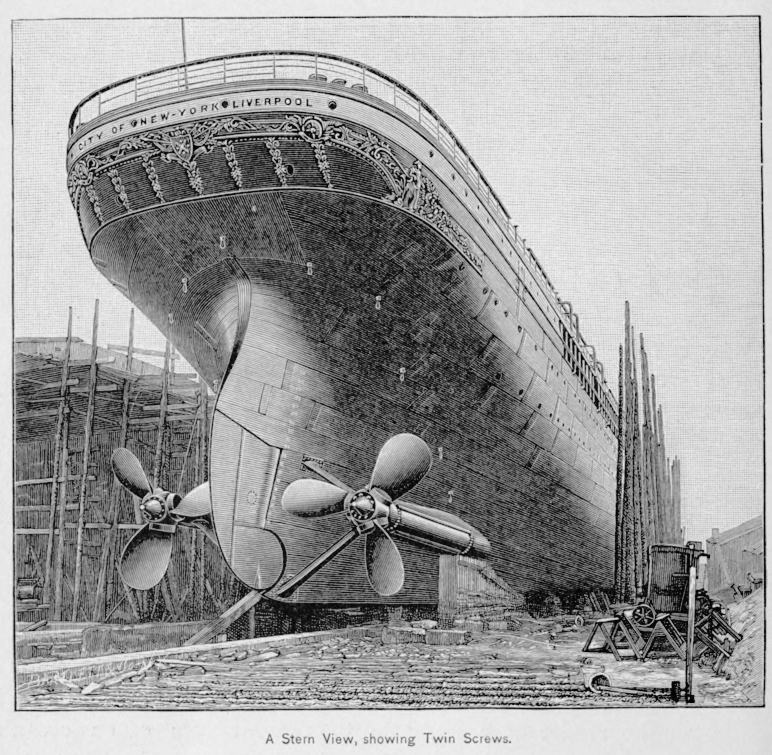
Stern view of City of New York

Records
Preceded by City of Paris	Blue Riband (Eastbound record); 1892–1893	Succeeded by Campania
