= Harvard station (disambiguation) =

Harvard station is a transit station in Cambridge, Massachusetts.

Harvard station may also refer to:

- Harvard station (CTA), a former Chicago 'L' station in Englewood, Chicago, Illinois
- Harvard station (Metra), a Metra station in Harvard, Illinois

== See also ==
- Harvard (disambiguation)
