= Samuel Harward =

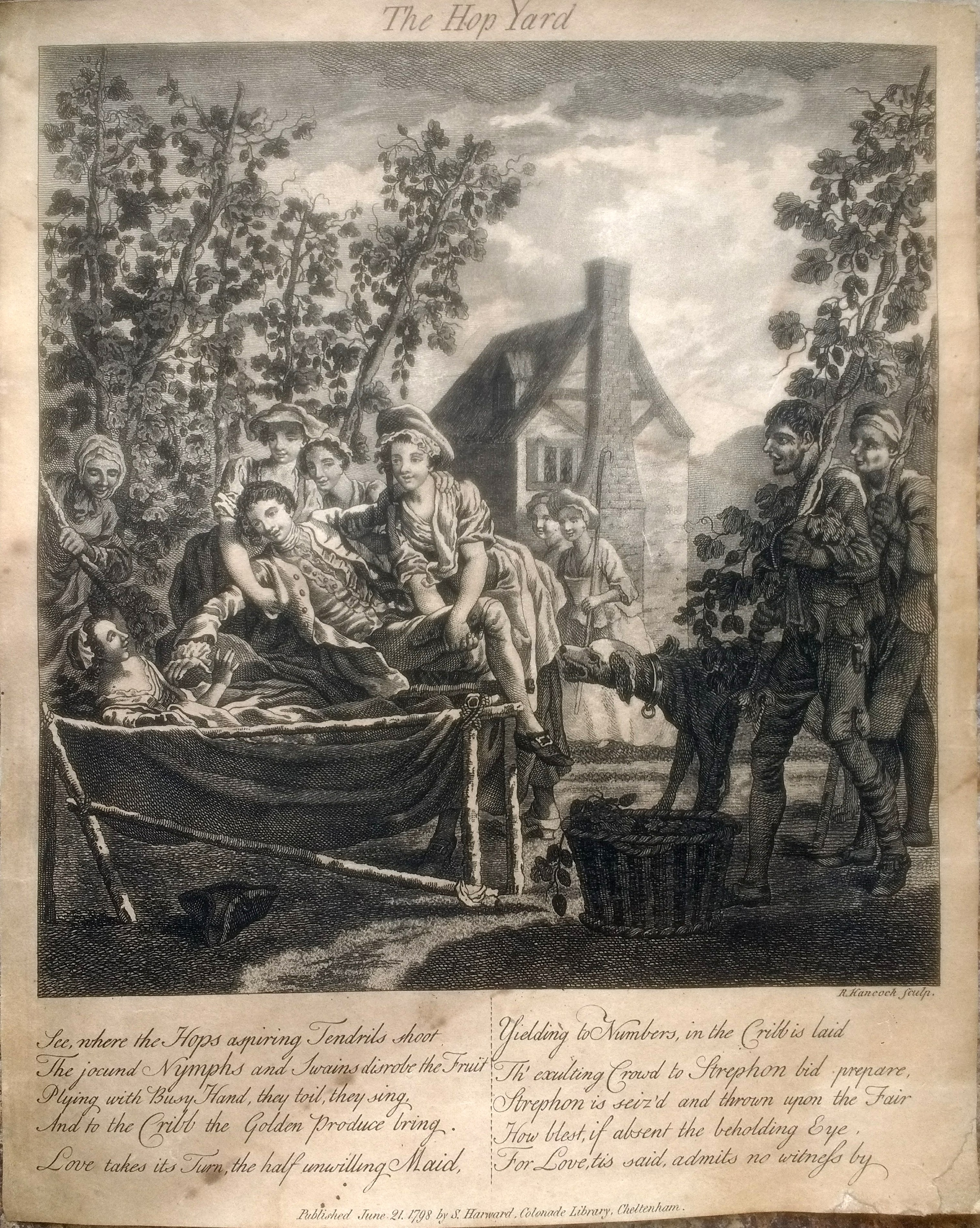

Samuel Harward (c1740 - 12 August 1809) was a printer and publisher in Gloucestershire, who is credited with the first works ever printed in Tewkesbury (1760) and Cheltenham (1786). He published or reprinted many popular ballads and other items of early folk literature, and later built up the biggest lending library in Regency Cheltenham, where he also invested astutely in property.

== Career ==
Harward, who came from a family seated in Hartlebury, Worcestershire, was established as a stationer and printer in Tewkesbury by 1760, being the first recorded printer in that town. Between 1760 and 1775, he printed some 70 chapbooks, covering popular 'penny' histories and tragedies, as well as some 20 ‘garlands’. These 'garlands' were 8-page booklets of ballads. He had expanded his business to Cheltenham by 1778, and had a further shop in Gloucester (20 Westgate Street) by 1783. In Cheltenham, his printing and stationery business in the High Street was also home to his first lending library. He had begun buying land in the increasingly fashionable spa town of Cheltenham by 1771. He concentrated on the area south of the High Street, where in the 19th century the Promenade was to be developed. As a significant proprietor, he was one of the town's first Paving Commissioners (1786). He was a major stakeholder in the development, from 1791, of The Colonnade, an imposing new range of lodging houses and shops, and in his will, drafted 1803, left instructions for the completion of the last of this range. At No. 4 The Colonnade, he established an extensive new lending library, said to comprise nearly 30,000 volumes on all subjects, collected over 50 years. On the same premises he also offered framed and loose prints (many published by himself), musical instruments, stationery, china, and musical clocks. Among the engravers he commissioned for original prints was Robert Hancock.

== Personal life ==
He died from an apoplectic fit on 12 August 1809. The announcement of his death noted that he was ‘a man of uncommon activity and exertion’. Quite late in life, on 8 Aug 1802, he had married Kitty Brooks of Cheltenham. No issue is recorded. His will refers to his uncle, Michael Harward of Hartlebury, Worcestershire, and cousins John and Thomas, both clergymen. He was latterly resident in Charlton Kings, Gloucestershire, and was buried there.
