= American Black Sea Line =

Defunct American shipping company

The American Black Sea Line was a shipping company based in the United States which operated from 1921 until 1923.

== History ==
The company was founded in 1921 by Stephen D. Stephendis.

The company started when Stephen D. Stephendis bought the Kilpatrick from the U.S. government. He rebuilt the ship, added a second funnel and renamed it the Acropolis. It was sold in 1923 to the Booras Brothers. The second ship, the New York, was chartered from the Irish American Line in 1922 and sailed only once for Stephendis from New York to Constantinople before being sold by auction.

== Fleet ==
Its fleet included:

- Acropolis (ex-Kilpatrick, née-Michigan), sold in 1923 to the Booras Brothers
- City of New York, chartered from the Irish American Line
