= SS City of Paris (1888) =

British-built passenger liner

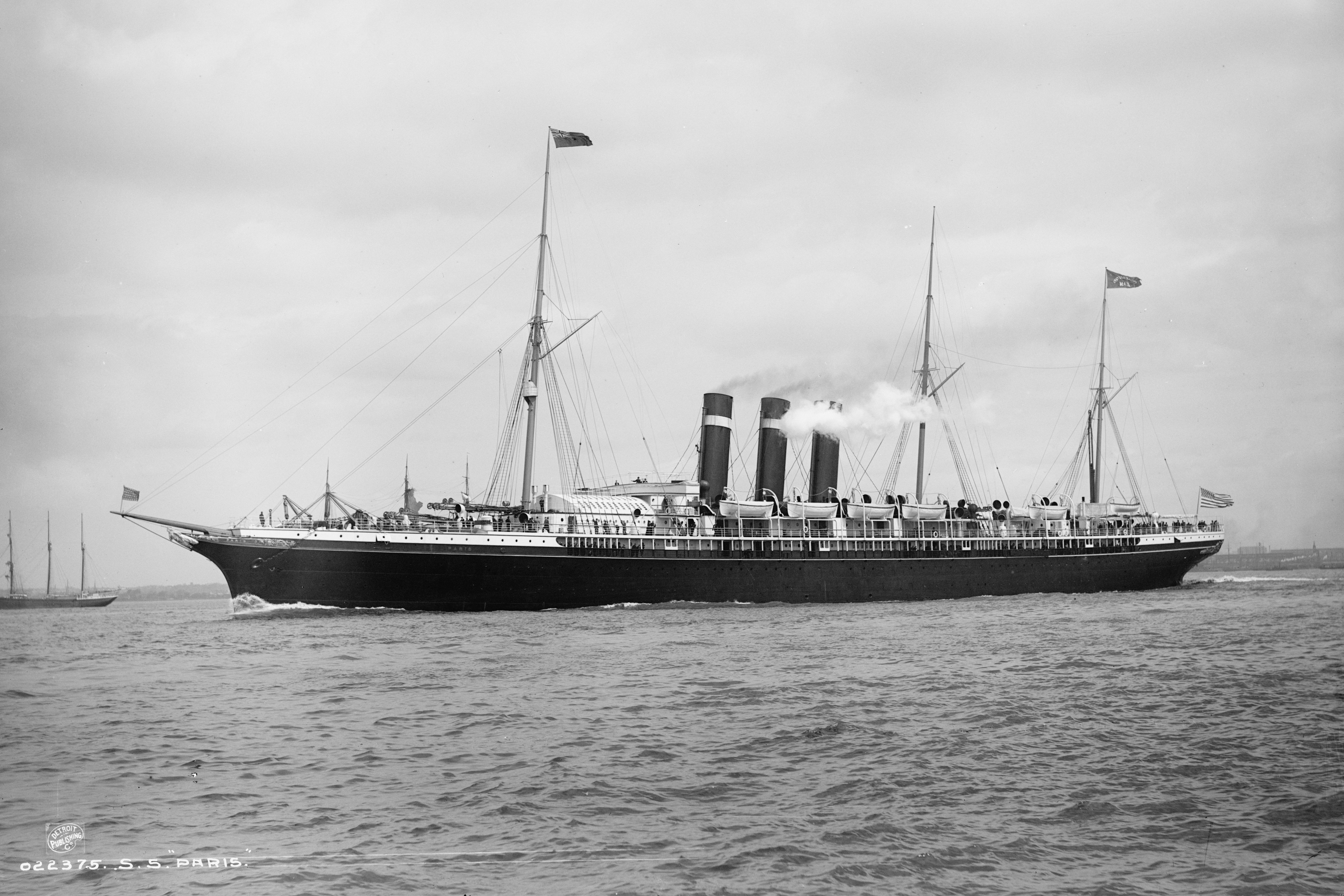
- SS Paris (formerly City of Paris) in the mid 1890s

History

United Kingdom
- Name: City of Paris
- Owner: Inman Line (later International Navigation Company)
- Route: Atlantic crossing.
- Builder: J & G Thomson of Clydebank, Scotland
- Cost: $1,850,000
- Yard number: 241
- Launched: 20 October 1888
- Maiden voyage: 3 April 1889
- Fate: Merged into American Line in 1893

United States
- Name: Paris
- Owner: American Line (1893–1922); US Navy (1898-1899 and 1918-1919); New York-Naples Steamship Company (1922-1923)
- Route: Atlantic crossing.
- Renamed: USS Yale (1898); Philadelphia (1901); USS Harrisburg (1918); Philadelphia (1919)
- Fate: Scrapped at Genoa, Italy in 1923

General characteristics
- Type: Steamship
- Tonnage: 10,508 GRT, 5,589 NRT
- Displacement: 17,270 tons (17,550 tonnes)
- Length: 560 ft (170 m)
- Beam: 63 ft (19 m)
- Installed power: 18,000 hp (20,880 kW)
- Propulsion: Triple expansion reciprocating steam engines, twin propellers.
- Speed: 20 knots (37 km/h; 23 mph)
- Complement: 1,740 passengers
- Crew: 362 Officers and crew

City of Paris was a British-built passenger liner of the Inman Line that held the Blue Riband as the fastest ship on the north Atlantic route from 1889 to 1891 and again from 1892 to 1893. A sister ship of the City of New York and a rival of the White Star Line Teutonic and Majestic, she proved to be the quickest of the pre-Campania twin-screw express liners. In 1893, she was renamed Paris and transferred to US registry when the Inman Line was merged into the American Line. She and her sister were paired with the new American built St Louis and St Paul to form one of the premier Atlantic services.

Paris served in the US Navy as the auxiliary cruiser USS Yale during the Spanish–American War and is remembered for slipping into the harbor at San Juan, Puerto Rico, under the Spanish guns of Morro Castle. After Paris returned to commercial service, she was seriously damaged in 1899 when she grounded on The Manacles off the British coast. Rebuilt and renamed Philadelphia, she sailed for the American Line until requisitioned again during World War I as the transport Harrisburg. After the war, she continued with the American Line until 1920 and was scrapped in 1923.

== Development and design ==
In 1886, the UK flagged Inman Line became bankrupt and was taken over by its largest creditor, the Philadelphia-based International Navigation Company. The firm's vice president, Clement Griscom immediately sailed to Liverpool with a commitment from the Pennsylvania Railroad to provide $2 million in capital towards the building of a new ship to compete against Cunard and White Star. Scottish shipbuilders were suffering a recession and proposed construction of two identical ships at the discounted price of $1,850,000 apiece by J. & G. Thompson in Glasgow. The Pennsylvania Railroad agreed to finance the second ship that became the City of Paris.

Six years earlier, Inman returned the City of Rome to her builders when she failed to meet the contract's performance guarantees. At 8,500 GRT. the original design for the City of New York and the City of Paris was only slightly bigger than City of Rome, but with steel hulls instead of iron. The final designed called for ships almost 25% larger at 10,500 GRT. To address the vibration problems of most liners of the period, the new Inman liners were given a ratio of length to beam of 8.3 to 1 as compared to the then common ratio of 10 to 1. The hull was more extensively subdivided than previously attempted. The ships were equipped with a full double bottom and 15 transverse bulkheads that reached the saloon deck. They also received a fore-aft bulkhead over their entire length.

Power was supplied by two triple expansion engines of 9,000 indicated horsepower each that were placed in separate compartments. While the engines for the two sisters were identical, City of Paris produced 1,500 more horsepower. The ships were the first express liners with two propellers. Single screw liners were prone to shaft failure that forced them to return to port using auxiliary sails. With the introduction of twin screws, liners were more reliable and no longer needed sails.

The new Inman "Cities" are still regarded as among the most beautiful liners to ever cross the Atlantic. The plan included City of Rome's classic clipper bow and three raked funnels. Designed for 540 first, 200 second and 1,000 steerage passengers, luxuries included hot and cold water, electric ventilation, and electric lighting. First class public rooms, such as the library and smoking room, were fitted with walnut panels and the dining salon had a massive dome that provided a natural light to the passengers.

== Service history ==
=== Early service, 1889–1898 ===
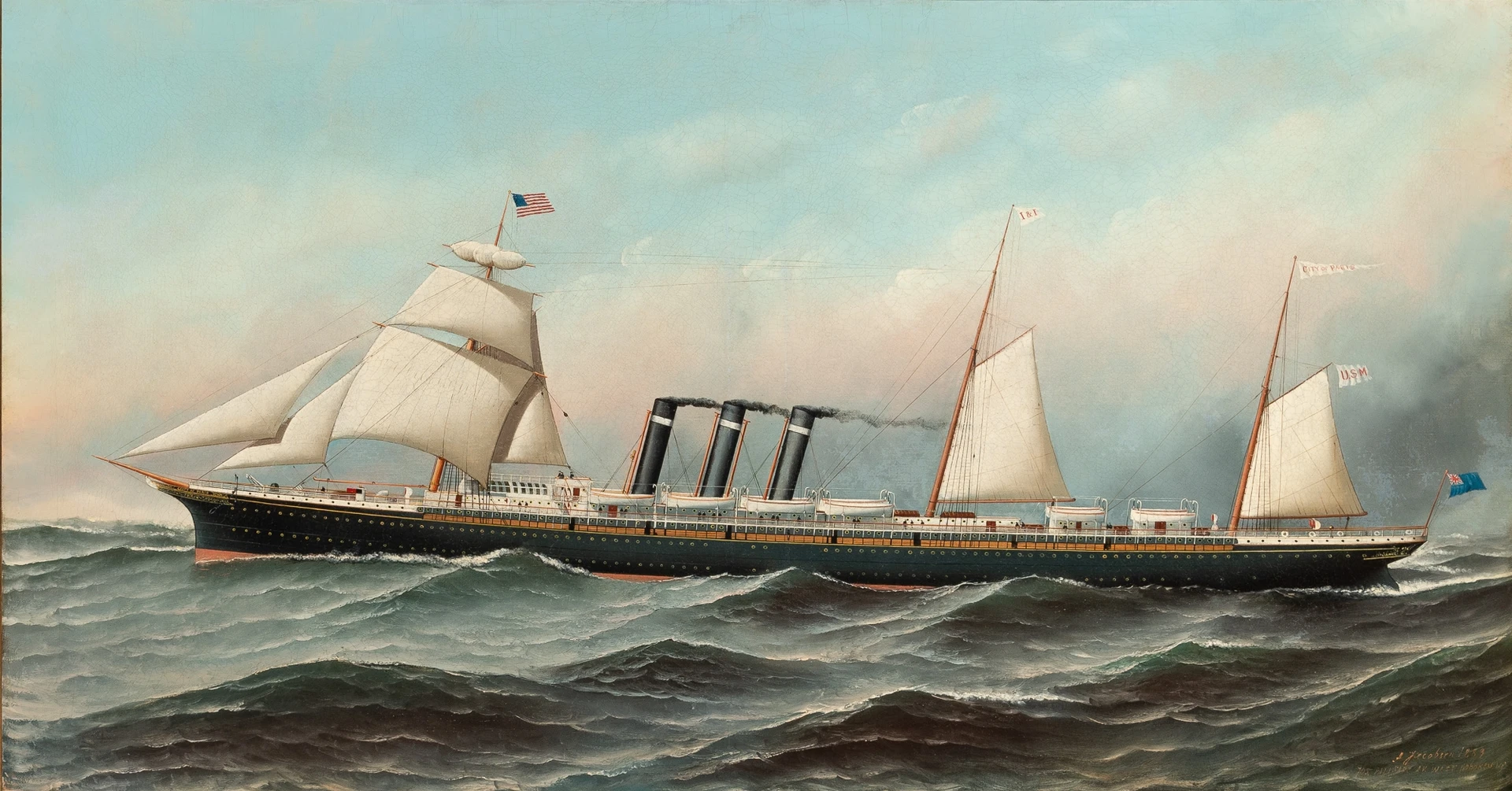
City of Paris in 1889. Oil-on-canvas painting by Antonio Jacobsen

City of Paris was launched seven months after City of New York and began her maiden voyage on 3 April 1889. A month later, she won the Blue Riband with an average speed of 19.95 knots on the first westbound voyage under six days. On March 25, 1890 City of Paris was steaming towards Liverpool when her starboard propeller shaft broke, causing the starboard engine to race and then disintegrate. Fragments pierced the hull and the bulkhead causing both engine rooms to flood. Fortunately, the ship's extensive subdivision proved successful and she was not in danger of sinking. However, City of Paris was dead in the water and was towed to Queenstown by the tramp steamer Aldersgate, commanded by Captain - and Master Mariner - George Humphrey James Chesshire. It was ultimately determined that the accident was caused by failure to synchronize the engines, a common problem with early twin screw express liners. City of Paris was out of service for a year undergoing repairs. In July 1891, her westbound speed record was broken by White Star's Majestic and then Teutonic. City of Paris regained the Blue Riband in 1892 and held it until 1893 when Cunard's Campania entered service.

International Navigation did not register most of its ships in the United States because of high American wage rates. Even before City of Paris was completed, the British Government responded to Inman's ownership change by revoking the line's mail contract. International Navigation lobbied the US Congress to replace the subsidy. Under US law, only US built ships could be registered there. After considerable controversy, Congress waived this requirement for Inman's two record breakers and enacted the subsidy. Under this legislation, International Navigation was required to build two similar ships in the US and make all four twin screw liners available to the government in the event of a crisis. On February 22, 1893, the Inman Line was officially merged into International Navigation's American Line and New York's American flag was raised by President Benjamin Harrison. As Paris was in the UK preparing to depart from Liverpool, her American flag was raised two weeks later by Clement Griscom's 13-year-old daughter when the ship arrived in New York.

As a part of the change to American registration, the former Inman liners began to use Southampton as their UK destination. The Southampton Docks Company facilitated this change by building Prince of Wales Graving Dock. When this was opened by Paris in August 1895, it was the largest dry dock in the world.

=== Spanish–American War, April–September 1898 ===
During the mid-1890s, the Navy stored guns at the Brooklyn Navy Yard to speed the conversion of Paris and her running mates in case of war. On April 14, 1898, ten days before the Spanish–American War was declared, the Navy requisitioned the big four as auxiliary cruisers. The U.S. Navy chartered her on 27 April 1898 from the International Navigation Co. Paris was approaching Southampton and did not arrive in New York until April 28. In just three days, the Navy installed her 12 six-inch main guns, 20 six-pounders and numerous secondary weapons. Under the command of Captain William Wise USN, the renamed Yale, commissioned on 2 May 1898, was dispatched to Puerto Rico to look for the Spanish fleet.

On the day of her commissioning into the Navy, Yale put to sea from New York, bound for Puerto Rico to patrol and help locate Admiral Cervera's Spanish fleet.

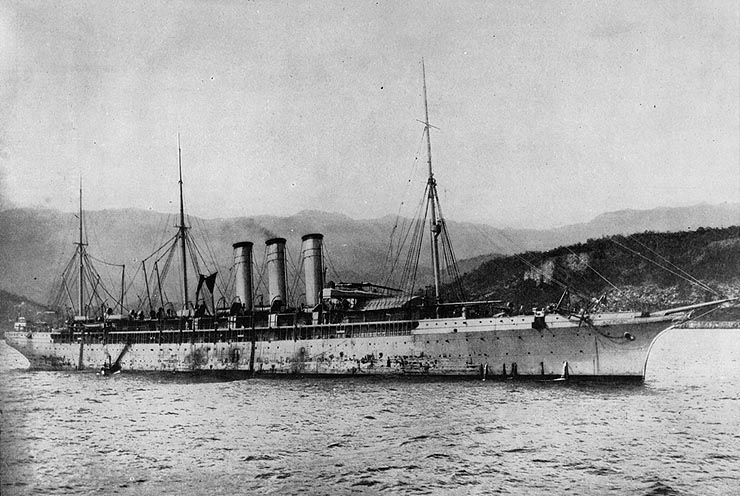
USS Yale in Cuba

Off of San Juan, Captain Wise realized that he must pass the Spanish guns at Morro Castle and sail into the harbor to determine if the Spanish fleet was anchored there. Because Yale had not been painted gray, she still looked like a passenger liner. Wise knew that the Spanish government was trying to acquire passenger ships and that one of the vessels potentially available was the Anchor (former Inman) City of Rome, which was almost identical to the Yale. In fact, City of Rome was later chartered by the Spanish. The Captain ordered the Union Jack raised along with City of Rome's recognition signals as Yale passed the fort. After determining that the Spanish fleet was not in the harbor, Yale dipped her flag in salute as she returned to sea. The Spanish returned the compliment, not realizing that an American auxiliary cruiser was directly under the fort's guns. When out of range, Yale captured (2 May 1898) the Spanish Steamer Rita and put a prize crew aboard to sail her to Charleston, South Carolina.

The following day she had another brief encounter with the enemy off San Juan when a Spanish armed transport came out and fired a few shots. Yale was far more weakly armed than her opponent and retired from the scene. She returned to San Juan the following day, where a shore battery at Castillo San Cristóbal, under the orders of Captain Angel Rivero Mendez, fired two poorly aimed shots at her with its Ordóñez guns; both shots fell far short.

Pursuant to her orders, Yale patrolled off Puerto Rico until 13 May, at which time she left for St. Thomas in the Danish West Indies (Virgin Islands) to telegraph her report to Washington. She returned briefly to Puerto Rico on 16 and 17 May, then headed for Cap-Haïtien, Haiti, in company with St. Paul. She remained at Cap-Haïtien until 21 May, then headed for waters off Santiago de Cuba where the Spanish fleet had been discovered. Yale remained there while the United States fleet assembled off Santiago to blockade Cervera's ships in that port. On the 28th, she quit the area; stopped briefly at Port Antonio, Jamaica; and then set a course for Newport News, Virginia. The ship spent 20 days at Newport News, heading back to Cuba on 23 June. She arrived off Santiago on 27 June but remained there only two days. On the 29th, she got underway for Key West, Florida, stopping there overnight on 3 and 4 July before continuing on to Charleston. Yale returned to Santiago on 11 July and remained in Cuban waters until the 17th. On July 22, Yale left Cuba as the command ship on the Puerto Rico expedition under General Miles. After participating in the invasion of Puerto Rico at Guánica, Puerto Rico, she set a course for New York on 26 July. She spent most of the first two weeks of August in New York and returned to Cuba on the 15th. Remaining only briefly, she embarked troops for the return voyage to New York. Yale arrived back in New York on 23 August and remained there until decommissioned on 2 September 1898. Though returned to her owners after decommissioning, Yale was not struck from the Navy List until 3 July 1899. She returned to merchant service—first under the name SS City of Paris.

=== Return to commercial service, 1898–1913 ===
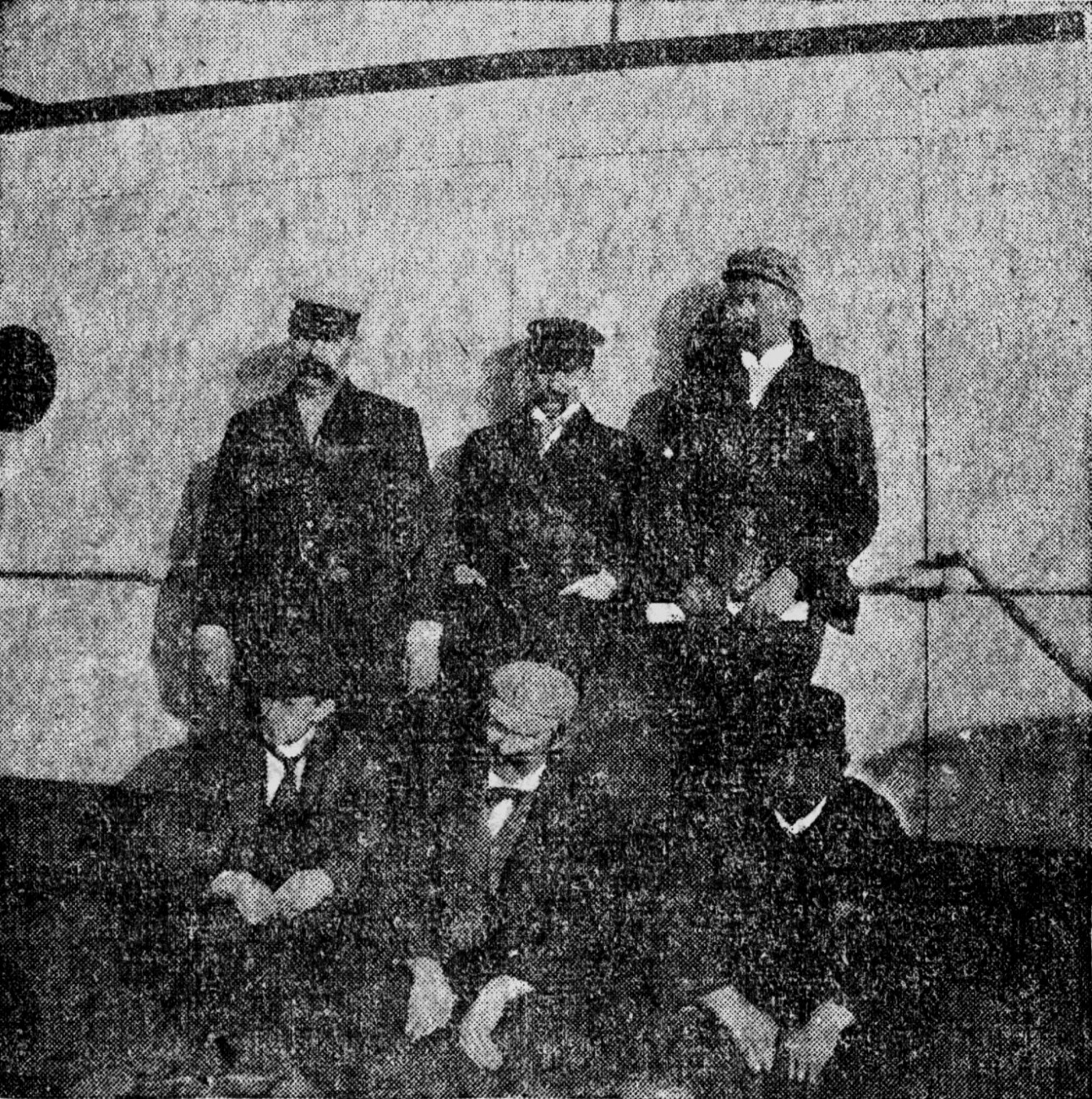
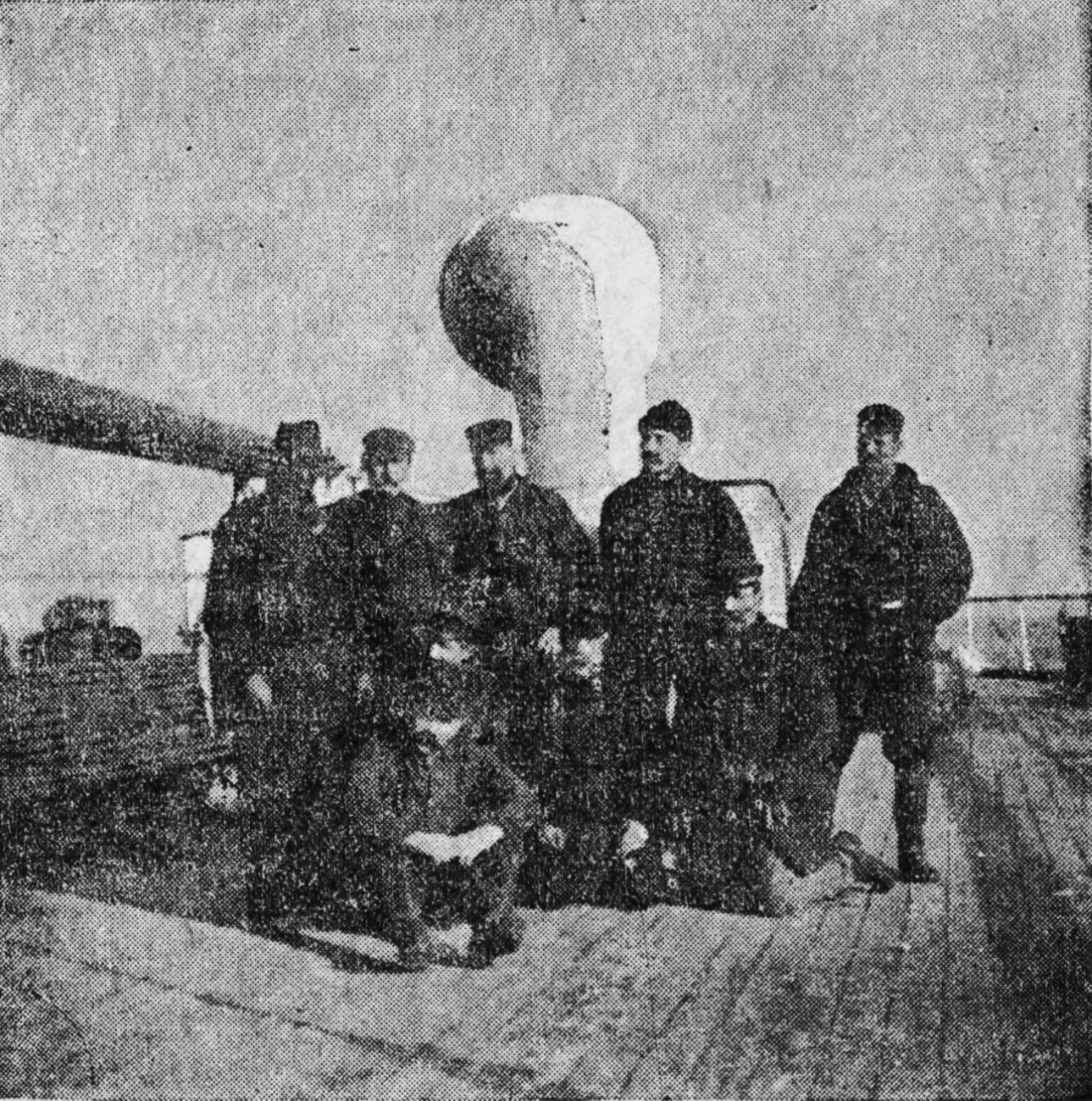
Rescued officers (left) and seamen of Vindobala aboard Paris

Paris returned to her regular trade and in December 1898 rescued 22 of 23 seamen aboard the British Vindobala before the tanker sank during a bad winter storm.

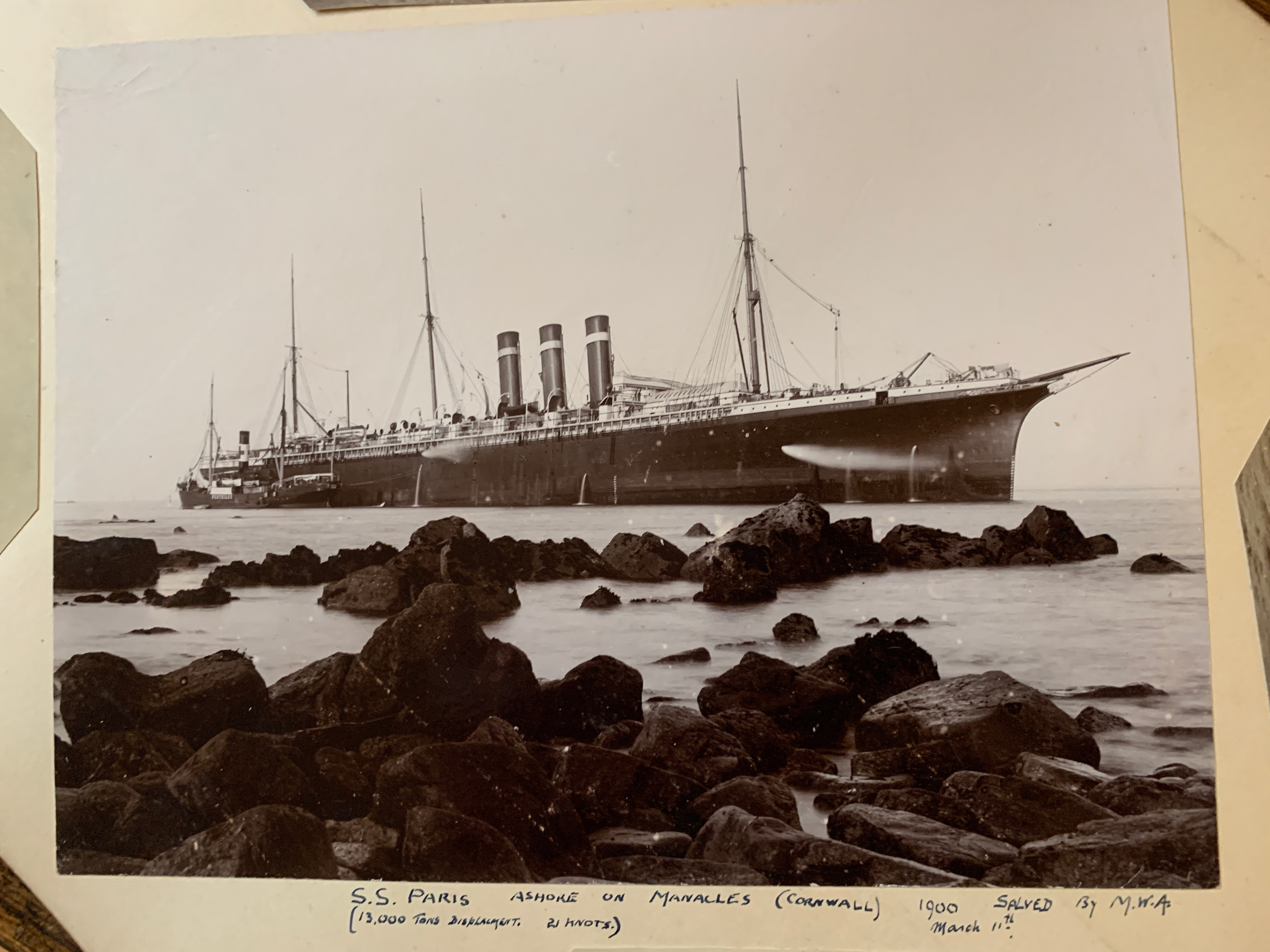
Paris beached on The Manacles Reef in 1899

While westbound on 21 May 1899, Paris ran aground in fog on The Manacles off the coast of Cornwall. The supervising salvage engineer was Matthew Wheldon Aisbitt (Superintendent, Cardiff Docks) and the scanned image is taken from his 1900 photograph album, which includes his original notes.

The Paris ran aground mere metres from another steamer, Mohegan, which had sunk 9 months earlier with a loss of 106 of 197 on board; in fact, she almost struck the sunken ship. Captain Watkins was held by the New York Board of Inspectors of Steam Vessels to have been wholly responsible for the negligent navigation of his ship and had his master's certificate suspended for two years. At first, Paris appeared to be a total loss and was not refloated until 11 July. After she was pulled from the rocks, the badly damaged ship was rebuilt at Belfast, Ireland, receiving new engines and having her triple smokestacks replaced by a pair of taller ones.

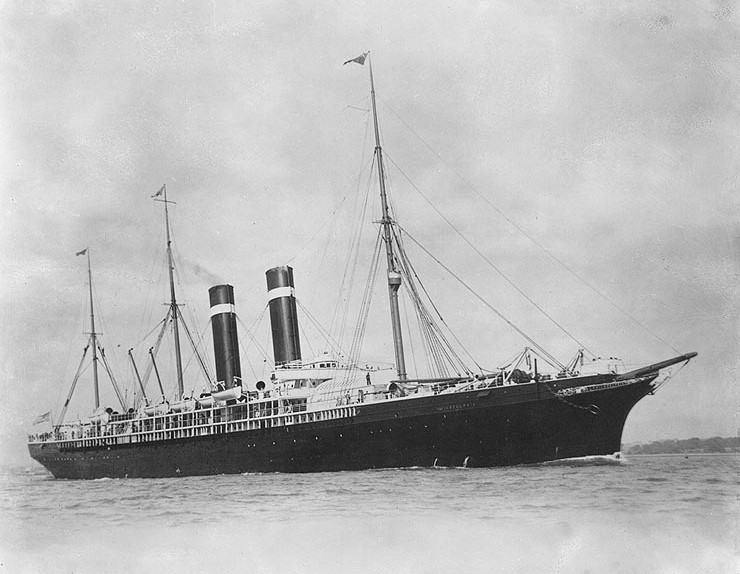
SS Philadelphia

Renamed Philadelphia, she finally resumed North Atlantic passenger service in August 1901.

Early in 1902 Guglielmo Marconi, while aboard Philadelphia off New York, sent and received radio signals over a distance of 1,800 miles. In 1908 the British family of Bob Hope emigrated to New York on the Philadelphia, and were processed at Ellis Island. In 1912, a coal strike at Southampton that spring kept the Philadelphia from sailing and many of her passengers were transferred to ill-fated RMS Titanic, including Eva Hart and her parents.

In 1913, Philadelphia was downgraded to a second- and third-class-only liner. At the beginning of World War I, the American Line reverted to Liverpool for their UK terminal. As a neutral flagged liner, Philadelphia was very profitable until the United States entered the war.

=== World War I ===
In 1918 she was recommissioned as USS Harrisburg (ID # 1663) in late May, as a troop transport under the command of Commander Wallace Bertholf. For the remainder of the conflict she continued to take troops to Europe, making four voyages to England and France before the November 1918 Armistice brought an end to the fighting. She then reversed the flow, making six more trips to transport servicemen home from the former war zone. USS Harrisburg was decommissioned in September 1919.

=== Postwar service and fate, 1919–1923 ===
Returned to her owners in September 1919 and again named Philadelphia, she resumed sailings on the New York–Southampton route for nine months until the American Line suspended that service. In 1922 the ship was purchased by newly-formed New York-Naples Steamship Company, which planned to use her on the Mediterranean service.

In August 1922, during her first eastbound voyage's stopover at Naples, the crew of Philadelphia mutinied. The ship was in arrears from repairs received in the Bay of Naples and Italian customs officials refused her permission to depart. Contemporaneous news outlets described the crew as Bolsheviks and members of the Industrial Workers of the World. True or not, they ransacked and burned the ship, and she was beached on 26 August 1922, leading the Italian authorities to arrest them. Philadelphia was scrapped in 1923.

== Bibliography ==
- USN Ships profile: USS Yale (1898), USS Harrisburg (ID # 1663), 1918-1919

Records
Preceded by Etruria	Holder of the Blue Riband (Westbound record); 1889–1891	Succeeded by Majestic
Preceded by Etruria	Blue Riband (Eastbound record); 1889–1892	Succeeded by City of New York
Preceded by Teutonic	Blue Riband (Westbound record); 1892–1893	Succeeded by Campania
