= SS Georgic =

British steam ship

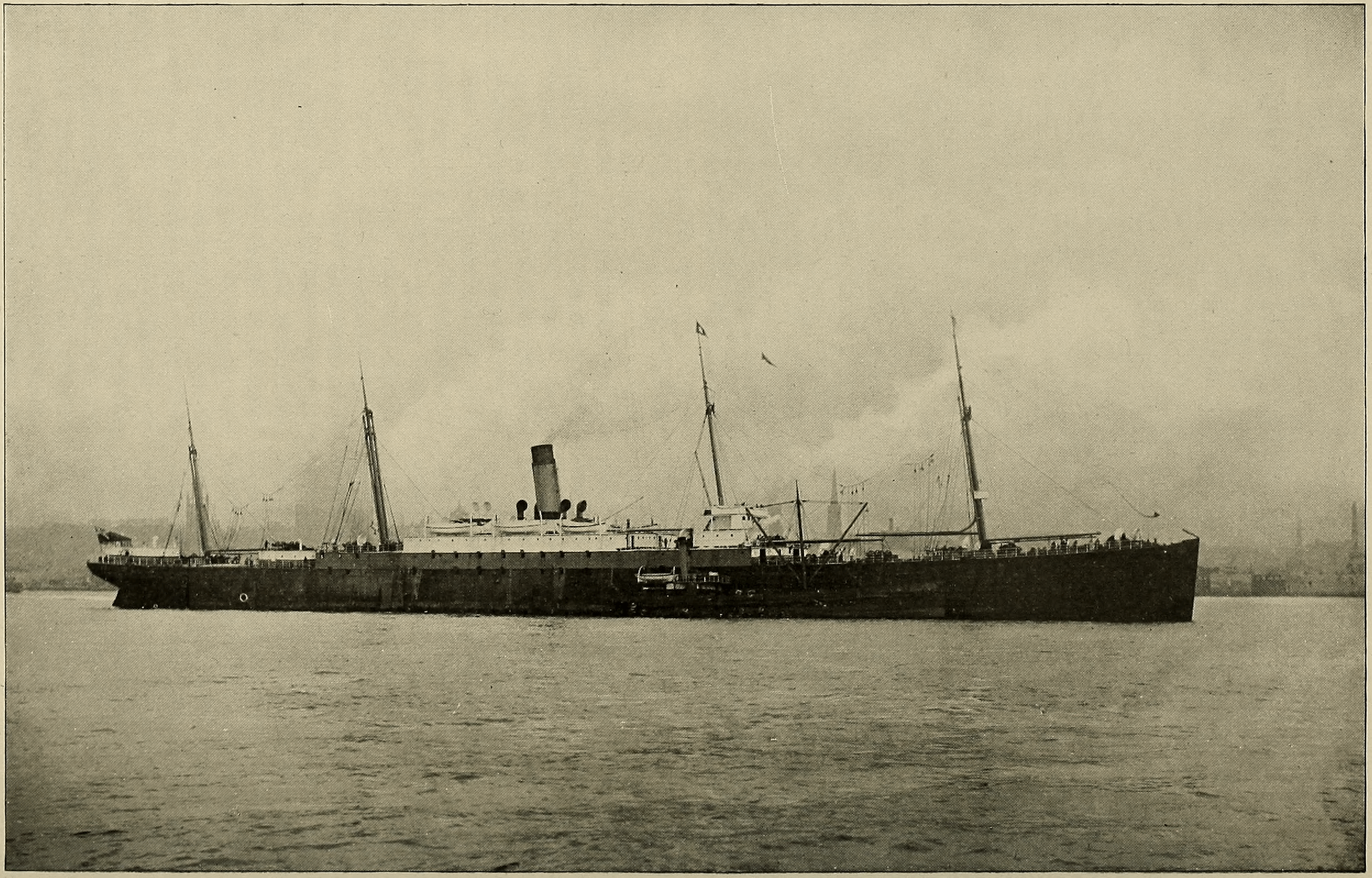
- SS Georgic

History

United Kingdom
- Name: 1895: Fordic; 1895: Georgic
- Owner: White Star Line
- Port of registry: (United Kingdom of Great Britain and Ireland) Liverpool
- Route: North Atlantic; United Kingdom-Australia
- Builder: Harland & Wolff Belfast
- Yard number: 293
- Launched: 22 June 1895
- Completed: 8 August 1895
- Maiden voyage: 26 August 1895
- In service: 1895
- Fate: Scuttled 10 December 1916
- Notes: Built as a replacement for the lost SS Naronic

General characteristics
- Type: Livestock carrier
- Tonnage: 10,077 GRT
- Length: 558 ft 8 in (170.28 m)
- Beam: 60 ft 4 in (18.39 m)
- Decks: 3
- Installed power: 4,500 ihp (3,400 kW)
- Propulsion: 2 × triple expansion steam engines, twin screw
- Speed: 13 knots (24 km/h; 15 mph)
- Capacity: 1,200 horses; 3,000 sheep; 18,000 tons of cargo
- Crew: 142

SS Georgic was a steamship built by Harland & Wolff for the White Star Line to replace SS Naronic which was lost at sea. She was initially named the Fordic, but was renamed just weeks before launch. Georgic was a cargo ship designed principally to carry livestock, at the time of entering service in 1895 she was the largest cargo ship in the world with a deadweight tonnage of 12,000 tons.

== Career ==
Georgic's maiden voyage took place on 26 August 1895. Her large size soon became a problem as it restricted her usage to the North Atlantic for most of her career, mostly operating between the UK and New York. From October 1909, along with the Bovic and Cevic, she was transferred to the service to Australia, calling at Adelaide and Sydney.

=== Incidents ===
The Georgic had a somewhat accident-prone career; she twice collided with the dock entrance at Liverpool, on 23 May 1896 and 5 August 1901.

On 10 March 1902, she collided with barque Oakhurst at Liverpool, the latter being badly damaged as a result.

On 18 January 1903, she collided with the British steamer SS Saxon King off Flemish Cap, although it was the Saxon King which rammed Georgic from the side, the former ship bore the brunt of the damage.

On 21 March 1904, she collided with the SS Kalabia in St George's Channel, both ships made Liverpool safely.

On 26 November 1908, she rammed the US owned SS Finance in fog off Sandy Hook. The latter sank with the loss of four lives.

=== World War I ===
After the outbreak of the First World War in August 1914, Georgic was used to ship horses and mules and other cargo from the United States for use on the Western Front by the Allies. On 3 December 1916, she left Philadelphia for Liverpool with a cargo of 1,200 horses, 10,000 barrels of oil and a large consignment of wheat intended for the Allies. One week later on 10 December when she was 590 miles (950 km) south-east of Newfoundland, she was intercepted by the German merchant raider SMS Möwe which was disguised as a Swedish merchant ship. After the crew of 142 were taken off the ship, explosive charges were placed on board Georgic by the crew of the Möwe, and she was scuttled with her cargo of 1,200 horses still on board. Georgic was the largest ship sunk by the Möwe.

== See also ==
- MV Georgic (1931)
