= White Star Line =

British shipping company (1845–1934)

- Type: Partnership
- Industry: Shipping, transport
- Founded: Original: 1845; 181 years ago; Relaunch: 1868; 158 years ago
- Founder: John Pilkington; Henry Wilson
- Defunct: Original: 1867; 159 years ago; Relaunch: 1934; 92 years ago
- Fate: Original: Bankruptcy; Relaunch: Merged with Cunard Line
- Successor: Cunard-White Star Line
- Area served: Transatlantic, Australia and New Zealand
- Parent: Ismay, Imrie and Company (1868–1902); International Mercantile Marine Co. (1902-1927); Royal Mail Steam Packet Company (1927-1934)
- Footnotes House flag

The Oceanic Steam Navigation Company, better known as the White Star Line, was a British shipping line. Founded out of the remains of a defunct packet company, it gradually grew to become one of the most prominent shipping companies in the world, providing passenger and cargo services between the British Empire and the United States. While many other shipping lines focused primarily on speed, White Star branded their services by focusing more on providing comfortable passages for both upper class travellers and steerage passengers.

White Star is remembered for its innovative vessel Oceanic, its long-serving flagship Olympic, and for the losses of some of its best passenger liners, including the wrecking of Atlantic in 1873, the sinking of Republic in 1909, the loss of Titanic in 1912, and the wartime sinking of Britannic in 1916. Despite its casualties, the company retained a prominent hold on shipping markets around the globe before falling into decline during the Great Depression. White Star merged in 1934 with its chief rival, the Cunard Line, operating as Cunard-White Star Line until Cunard purchased White Star's share in the joint company in 1950. Cunard then operated as a single company until 2005 and is now part of Carnival Corporation. As a lasting reminder of the White Star Line, modern Cunard ships use the term White Star Service to describe the level of customer service expected of the company.

== History ==
=== Early history (1845–1868) ===
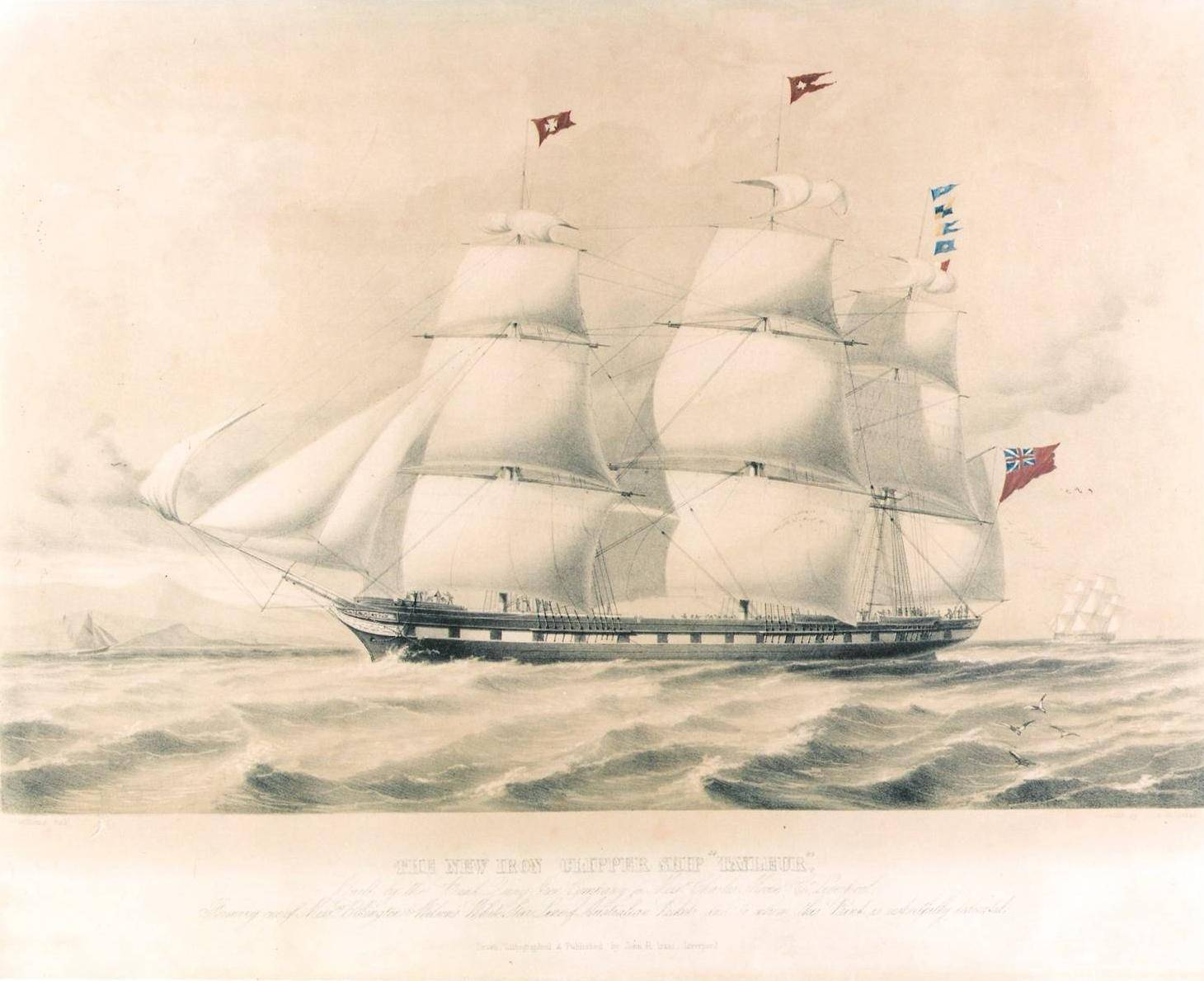
The sinking of the Tayleur was the first experienced by the company

The first company bearing the name White Star Line was founded in Liverpool, England, by John Pilkington and Henry Wilson in 1845. It focused on the UK–Australia trade, which increased following the discovery of gold in Australia in 1851. Because of this, many wished to emigrate to Australia, and the population of Australia increased from 430,000 to 1.7 million inhabitants in three years. From this time on, Pilkington and Wilson emphasized the safety of their ships when addressing the press. In order to make the crossings more pleasant aboard these austere wooden sailboats, musician groups were hired to allow the passengers to dance to popular tunes. In this trade, speed and size became important assets. The fleet initially consisted of the chartered sailing ships Tayleur, Blue Jacket, White Star, Red Jacket, Ellen, Ben Nevis, Emma, Mermaid and Iowa.

Tayleur, the largest ship of its day, was the one on which high hope was placed. These hopes were quickly dashed. Departing on its maiden voyage on 19 January 1854, Tayleur proved difficult to handle, and its crew was inexperienced. When it struck rocks in very rough seas at Lambay Island, near Ireland, on 21 January, the ship sank, with only 290 of the 650 people on board surviving. Subsequent inquiry placed the blame on its owners, Charles Moore & Co., who did not take the necessary safety precautions when the ship was put into service. This exonerated the White Star Line and the ship's captain of any blame.

In order to compensate for the loss of Tayleur, the company ordered several clippers of its own, the first of which was Red Jacket. The ship proved to be sufficiently efficient on the Australian route to ensure a certain success for the company, which could thus own new, faster ships such as Shalimar, Sultana, Emma and White Star. In addition, the company also ran voyages from Liverpool to Victoria, British Columbia, which it promoted in Welsh newspapers as being the gateway to the Klondike Gold Rush. One of the ships on this route was Silistria. Travelling around Cape Horn and stopping in Valparaíso and San Francisco, she reached Victoria after a voyage lasting four months.

In 1856, however, the company lost postal contracts, while Wilson persisted in wanting ever larger ships to keep the public's attention. Pilkington, becoming disillusioned, then left the company. Wilson replaced him with his brother-in-law, James Chambers, and the company continued its activities, betting everything on sailing ships while its most direct rivals, the Black Ball Line and the Eagle Line merged in 1858 after the difficulties engendered by the establishment of their service using steamships. During these years, Wilson paid attention to migration flows, directing his services to Canada or New Zealand according to trends. In 1863, the company acquired its first steamship, Royal Standard.

The original White Star Line merged with two other small lines in 1864, its competitors the Black Ball Line and the Eagle Line, to form a conglomerate: the Liverpool, Melbourne and Oriental Steam Navigation Company Limited. Meanwhile, under Wilson's leadership, the company continued to borrow large amounts of money to finance new construction, including its second steamer, Sirius. Worried, Chambers left the company and was replaced by John Cunningham, but business did not improve. Sirius had to be sold before it could enter service. The merger did not prosper and White Star broke away to concentrate on Liverpool to New York City services. Heavy investment in new ships was financed by borrowing, but the company's bank, the Royal Bank of Liverpool, failed in October 1867. White Star was left with an incredible debt of £527,000 (approximately equivalent to £70,674,000 in 2024), and was forced into bankruptcy.

==== The Oceanic Steam Navigation Company ====
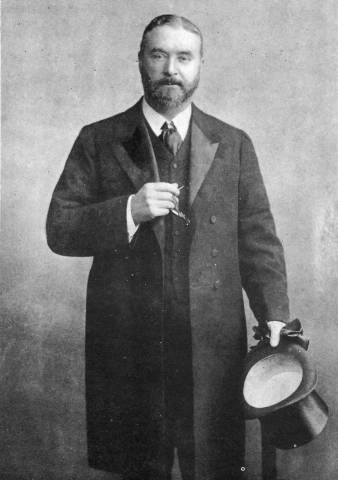
Thomas Ismay

On 18 January 1868, Thomas Ismay, a director of the National Line, purchased the house flag, trade name and goodwill of the bankrupt company for £1,000 (approximately equivalent to £123,600 in 2024), with the intention of operating large steamships on the North Atlantic service between Liverpool and New York. Ismay established the company's headquarters at Albion House, Liverpool. Ismay was approached by Gustav Christian Schwabe, a prominent Liverpool merchant, and his nephew, the shipbuilder Gustav Wilhelm Wolff, during a game of billiards. Schwabe offered to finance the new line if Ismay had his ships built by Wolff's company, Harland and Wolff. Ismay agreed, and a partnership with Harland and Wolff was established. The shipbuilders received their first orders on 30 July 1869. The agreement was that Harland and Wolff would build the ships at cost plus a fixed percentage and would not build any ships for White Star's rivals. In 1870, William Imrie joined the company.

As the first ship was being ordered, Ismay formed the White Star Line, with a capital of £400,000, divided into shares of £1,000. The company was managed by a new firm: Ismay, Imrie and Company. Despite this complex organization, the shipping company was known publicly throughout its existence as the White Star Line. A debate reigned as to which route Ismay expected to compete on when the company was launched. In 1870, four companies were firmly established on the route between Liverpool and New York: the Cunard Line, the Guion Line, the Inman Line and the more modest National Line, in which Ismay once had shares. The characteristics of the ships ordered from Harland and Wolff, however, hinted that Ismay aimed at the North Atlantic from the outset.

=== First transatlantic services (1868–1874) ===
==== The Oceanic class ====
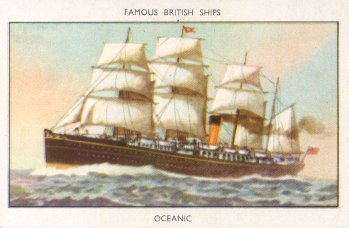
Oceanic of 1870 (3,707 GRT)

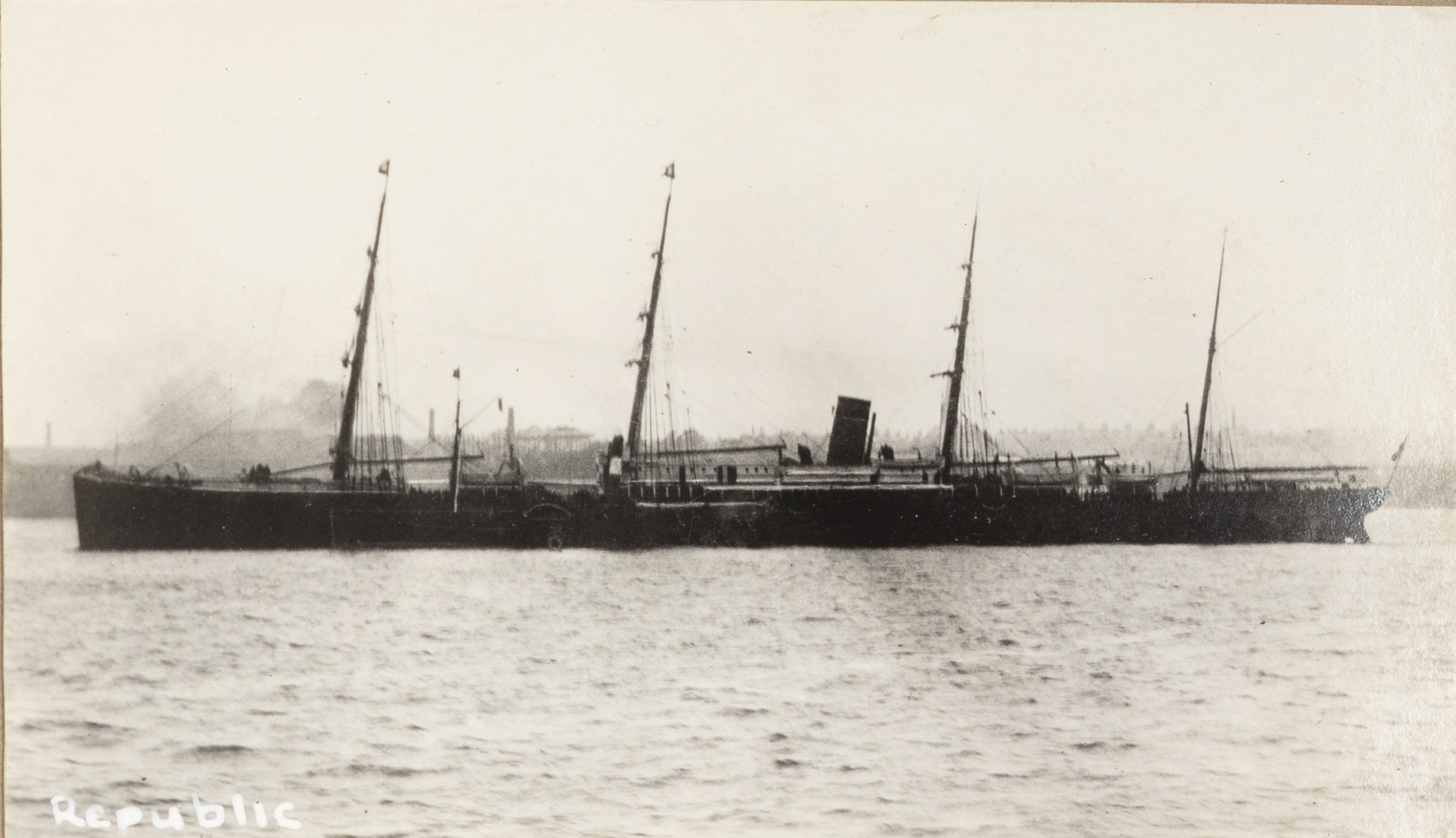
Republic of 1871 (3,708 GRT)

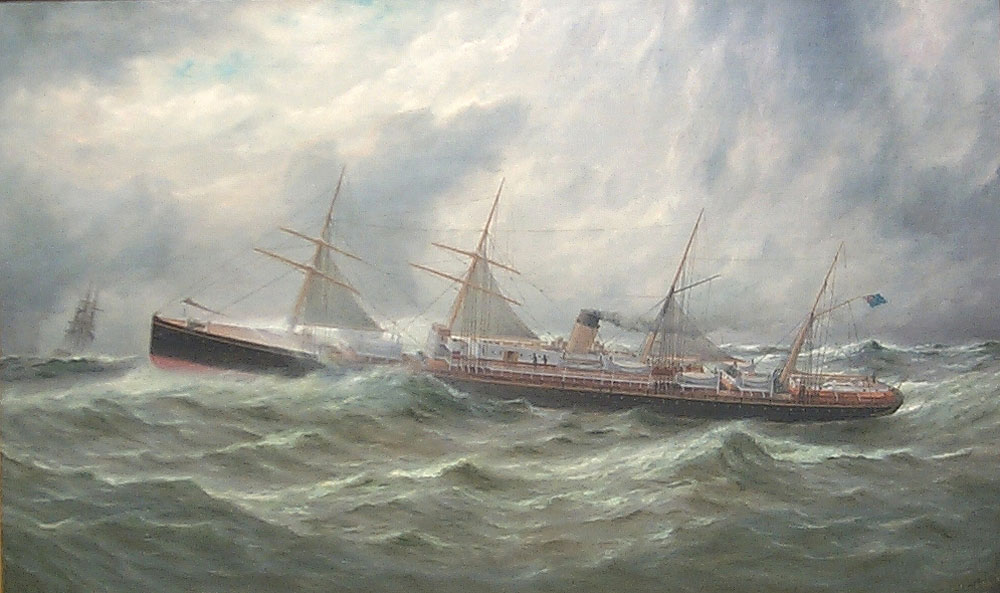
Adriatic of 1871 (3,888 GRT)

White Star began its North Atlantic run between Liverpool and New York with six nearly identical ships, known as the Oceanic class: Oceanic, Atlantic, Baltic and Republic, followed by the slightly larger Celtic and Adriatic. It had long been customary for many shipping lines to have a common theme for the names of their ships, and White Star gave their ships names ending in -ic. The line also adopted a buff-coloured funnel with a black top as a distinguishing feature for their ships, as well as a distinctive house flag, a red broad pennant with a swallowtail bearing a white five-pointed star. In the initial designs for this first fleet of liners, each ship was to measure 420 ft (130 m) in length, 40 ft (12 m) in width and approximately 3,707 gross register tons (GRT), equipped with compound expansion engines powering a single screw, and capable of speeds of up to 14 knots (26 km/h; 16 mph). They were also identical in passenger accommodations based on a two-class system, providing accommodations for 166 first class passengers amidships, which at the time was commonly referred to as 'Saloon Class' and 1,000 steerage passengers.

It was within the circles of the massive tides of immigrants flowing from Europe to North America that the White Star Line aimed to be revered by, as throughout the company's full history they regularly strived to provide passage for steerage passengers which greatly exceeded that seen with other shipping lines. With the Oceanic class, one of the most notable developments in steerage accommodations was the division of steerage at opposite ends of the vessels, with single men being berthed forward, and single women and families berthed aft, with later developments allowing married couples berths aft as well.

White Star's entry into the trans-Atlantic passenger market in the spring of 1871 got off to a rocky start. When Oceanic sailed on her maiden voyage on 2 March, she departed Liverpool with only 64 passengers aboard, from whence she was expected to make port at Queenstown the following day to pick up more passengers before proceeding to New York. However, before she had cleared the Welsh coast her bearings overheated off Holyhead and she was forced to return for repairs. She resumed her crossing on 17 March and ended up not completing the crossing to New York until 28 March. However, upon her arrival in New York, she drew considerable attention, as by the time she departed on her return crossing to Liverpool on 15 April, some 50,000 spectators had looked her over. White Star's troubles with their first ship were short lived and Oceanic's second crossing to New York was more successful. She departed Liverpool on 11 May and arrived in New York on 23 May with 407 passengers aboard.

In the eighteen months that followed, the five remaining ships were completed, and one by one, joined her on the North Atlantic run. Atlantic sailed on her maiden voyage from Liverpool on 8 June without incident. However, later that summer another problem surfaced which posed a threat to public opinion of the company. Of the six ships, the names originally selected for the third and sixth ships of the class had initially been Pacific and Arctic, which when mentioned in the press appeared alongside references to two ships of the same names which had belonged to the now defunct Collins Line, both of which were lost at sea with large losses of life. In the cases of those ships, both of which had been wooden-hulled paddle steamers, Arctic had foundered off the coast of Newfoundland in September 1854 after colliding with another ship, resulting in the loss of over 300 lives, while Pacific vanished with 186 people on board in January 1856. As a result, White Star made arrangements to change the names of these two ships. The third ship, which had been launched as Pacific on 8 March 1871 was renamed Baltic prior to its completion and the keel of the sixth vessel, which had just been laid down at Harland & Wolff and dubbed Arctic, was renamed Celtic prior to her launch.

The fourth vessel of the Oceanic class, Republic, sailed on her maiden voyage on 1 February 1872, around which time modifications were being made to the last two ships still under construction. Alterations in their designs called for their hulls to be extended in length by 17 ft (5.2 m), which also increased their tonnage. Adriatic entered service on 11 April 1872, followed by Celtic six months later on 24 October. These ships began their careers with notable success. Adriatic, after barely a month in service, became the first White Star ship to capture the Blue Riband, having completed a record westbound crossing in 7 days, 23 hours and 17 minutes at an average speed of 14.53 knots (26.91 km/h; 16.72 mph). In January 1873, Baltic became the first of the line to capture the Blue Riband for an eastbound crossing, having completed a return trip to Liverpool in 7 days, 20 hours and 9 minutes at an average speed of 15.09 knots (27.95 km/h; 17.37 mph).

==== Hesitation and disaster ====
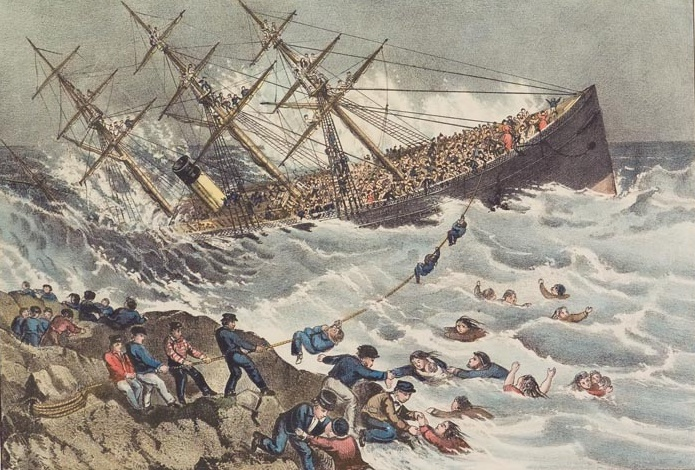
The sinking of the Atlantic in 1873 was one of the deadliest of that period

The company did not focus only on the North Atlantic. In 1871, it purchased two ships while they were under construction, Asiatic and Tropic. They were initially placed on the route to India via the Suez Canal, but this route proved to be unprofitable. Once the six Oceanic-class ships were in service, and five sufficient for a weekly service, Ismay decided to move Republic, accompanied by Asiatic, Tropic and two recently purchased liners, Gaelic and Belgic, onto the route to South America, in order to compete with the Pacific Steam Navigation Company. Although Republic was successful in her only crossing on this route, she was quickly withdrawn, and her fellow liners gradually suffered the same fate. The route remained however, serviced by the company's sailboats, whose management returned to William Imrie, and was quickly dedicated to a separate company, the North Western Shipping Company.

The first substantial loss for the company came only four years after its founding, with the sinking of the SS Atlantic and the loss of 535 lives near Halifax, Nova Scotia on 31 March 1873. While en route to New York from Liverpool amidst a vicious storm, Atlantic attempted to make port at Halifax when a concern arose that the ship would run out of coal before reaching New York. However, when attempting to enter Halifax, she ran aground on the rocks and sank in shallow waters. Despite being so close to shore, a majority of those onboard drowned, with 585 of the 952 onboard perishing. White Star found itself being accused of not having supplied enough coal to the ship, while the captain was sanctioned for having acted in an irresponsible manner. The crew were blamed for serious navigational errors by the Canadian Inquiry, although a British Board of Trade investigation cleared the company of all extreme wrongdoing. Although Atlantic was quickly erased from the advertisements of the White Star Line, she was not forgotten. With a personal contribution from Ismay, the company financed the maintenance of the graves of the victims and, in 1915, it contributed to the construction of a monument dedicated to the victims. In order to preserve the financial health of the company, Asiatic and Tropic were immediately sold.

=== Records and diversification (1874–1899) ===
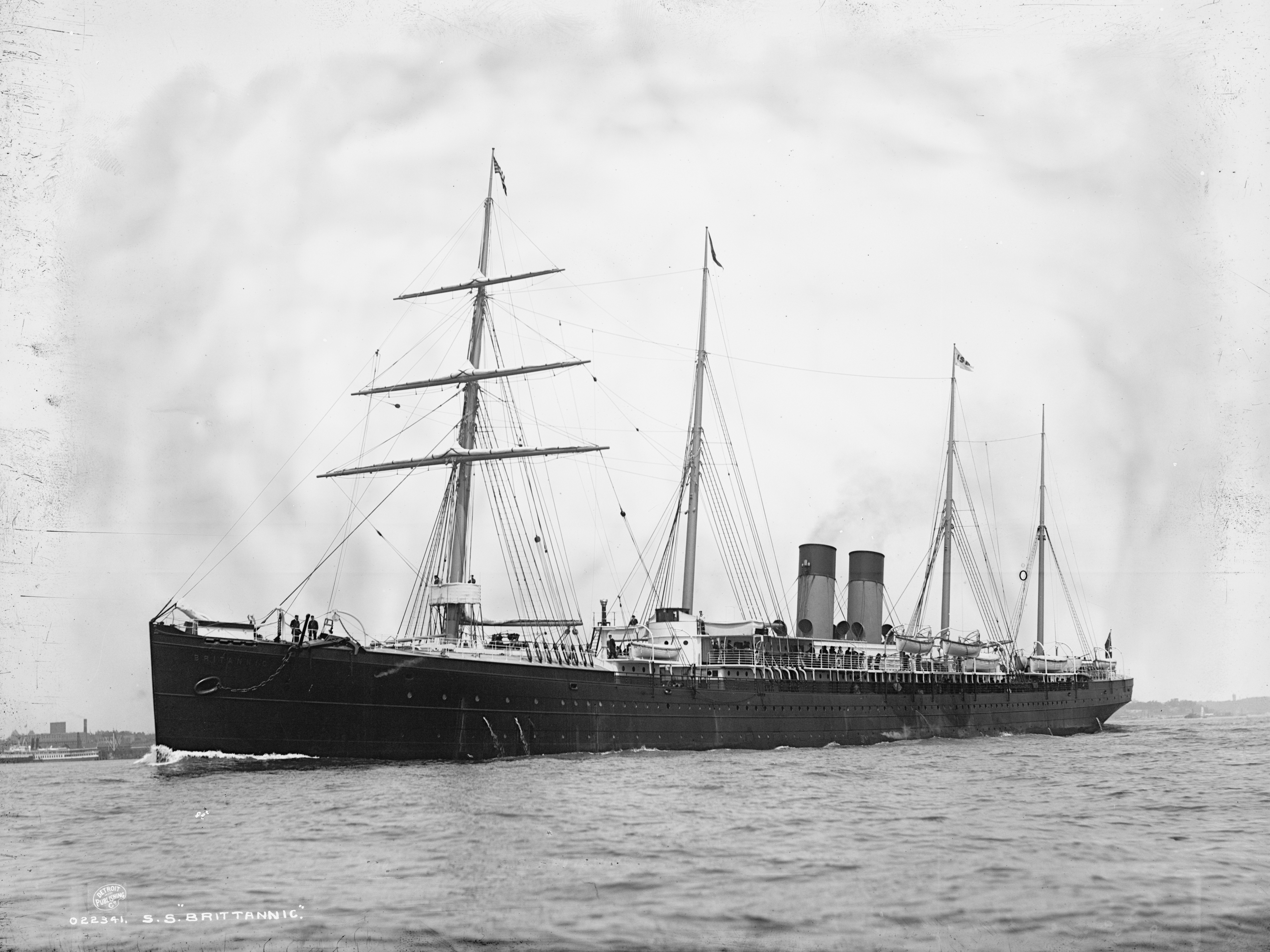
Britannic of 1874

In the wake of the Atlantic disaster, the White Star Line continued to expand its fleet. Gaelic and Belgic joined the five Oceanic-class liners, and the company's success continued to grow. However, rival companies quickly caught up: Cunard placed Botnia and Scythia into service, while the Inman Line ordered City of Brussels and Montana and Dakota entered service with the Guion Line. All were built in response to White Star's ground breaking liners and were thus larger.

In response, White Star ordered two new steamers from Harland & Wolff, both of which were designed as considerably larger, two-funnelled versions of the Oceanic-class steamers. These two ships measured 455 ft (139 m) in length and 45 ft (14 m) in width, with a gross tonnage of roughly 5,000 tons and with engines of similar design as seen in the earlier ships, with the exception of greater horsepower, capable of driving their single screws at speeds of up to 15 knots (28 km/h; 17 mph). Passenger capacity was also increased, with the two vessels able to carry 200 saloon passengers and 1,500 steerage passengers. The first of the pair, which had initially been named Hellenic, was launched as Britannic on 3 February 1874 and departed on her maiden voyage to New York on 25 June. Her sister Germanic (1874) was launched on 15 July 1874, but due to complications in her construction, she did not enter service until 20 May 1875. With the introduction of these new ships, Oceanic was declared surplus and, in the spring of 1875, was chartered to one of White Star's subsidiaries, the Occidental & Oriental Shipping company, under which she operated their trans-Pacific route between San Francisco, Yokohama and Hong Kong until her retirement in 1895. The two new steamers proved immensely popular on the North Atlantic run, and both would end up capturing the Blue Riband on two eastbound and three westbound crossings within a two-year period. Germanic captured the westbound record in August 1875, then captured the eastbound record in February 1876, while Britannic captured both records within less than two months of each other, beating the westbound record in November and the eastbound record in December. Germanic captured the westbound record for the last time in April 1877. During that same year, the company began sharing a postal agreement with the Cunard Line, allowing its ships' names to be prefixed with 'RMS' ('Royal Mail Ship').

==== Pacific and Indian Oceans ====
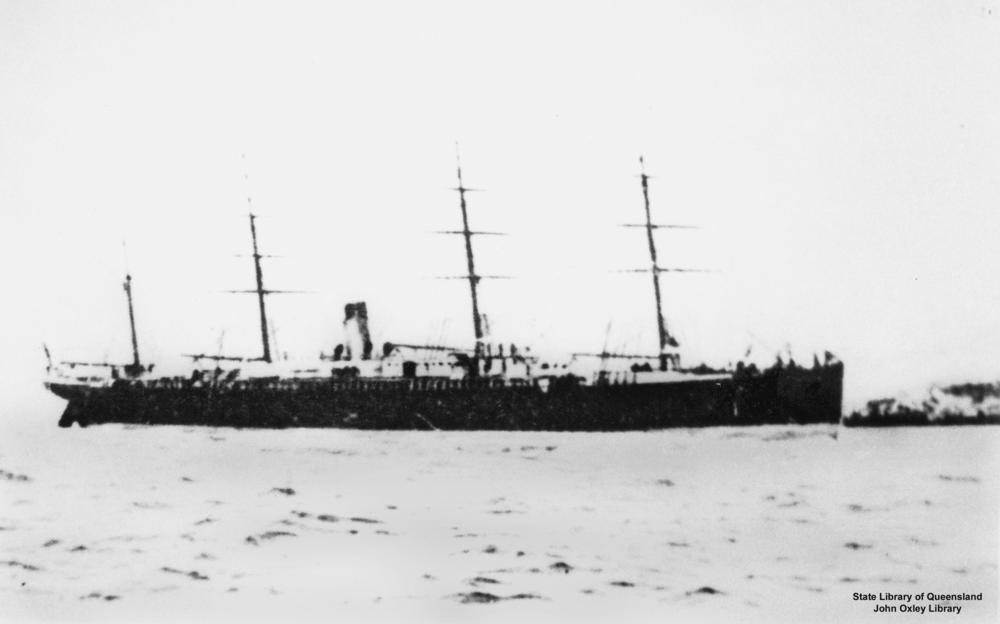
Coptic of 1881 (4,448 GRT)

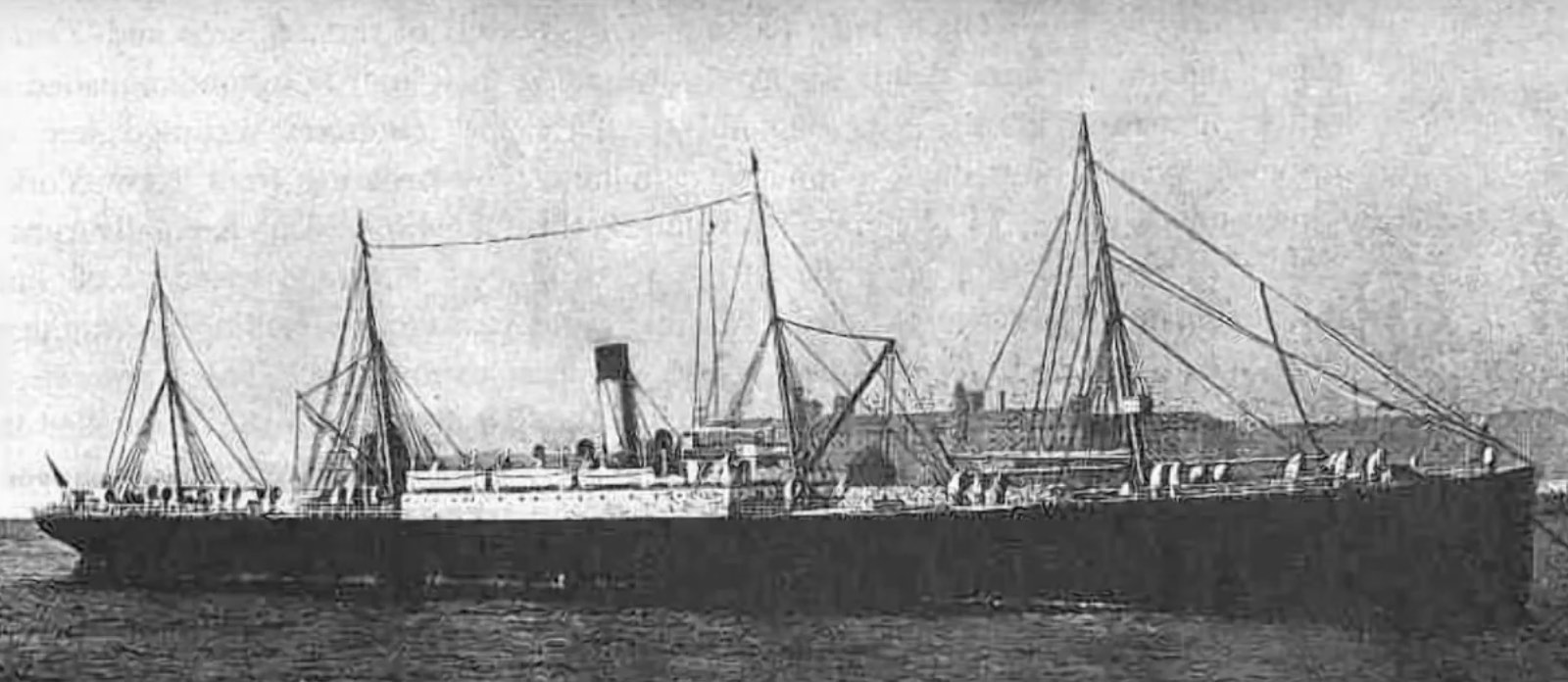
Bovic of 1892 (6,583 GRT)

The arrival of the two new liners created a surplus of ships on the North Atlantic route for the White Star Line. At the same time, George Bradbury, president of the Occidental and Oriental Steamship Company, a company formed in 1874 to compete with the Pacific Mail Steamship Company, enlisted the help of Thomas Ismay in setting up his new service. The White Star Line responded by lending the new company Oceanic, which had become a surplus ship, as well as Gaelic and Belgic. This charter initiative proved profitable, with Oceanic remaining on the San Francisco – Hong Kong route for twenty years. New ships were gradually assigned to this contract in the 1880s, such as Arabic in 1881, and the new Belgic (1885) and Gaelic (1885) in 1885. The partnership continued until 1906, when White Star withdrew Coptic from the Pacific route. The Occidental and Oriental Steamship Company disappeared two years later in the face of competition from the new ships of the Pacific Mail Company.

In 1882, the Shaw, Savill & Albion Line was founded, and it decided to open a route to New Zealand, but lacked experience. The White Star Line therefore proposed to provide a joint service, which started in 1884 with Coptic, Doric, and Ionic (1883) supplied by White Star, with Shaw, Savill & Albion providing Arawa and Tainui. The ships called at Australia on the outward journey, and through the Panama Canal on the return trip. From 1902, more ships were added to this joint service: Athenic, Corinthic and the second Ionic (1902), which were operated until the 1930s. The link between the two companies persisted even after the disappearance of the White Star Line, with the Shaw Savill & Albion Line continuing to use White Star's nomenclature and giving its ships names ending in -ic.

The diversification of the company's activities also required an update of its equipment. While the sailing ships gradually disappeared, the company acquired a new type of cargo ship, intended for the transport of live cattle. The first of these was Cufic, which entered service in 1888, followed a year later by Runic. Others, notably the sister ships Bovic and Naronic, followed in the 1890s. The latter became famous when, less than a year after her maiden voyage, she mysteriously disappeared with everyone aboard. Two other cattle carriers, Cevic and Georgic, were built in 1894 and 1895 respectively, before the company abandoned this type of business.

==== Teutonic and Majestic ====
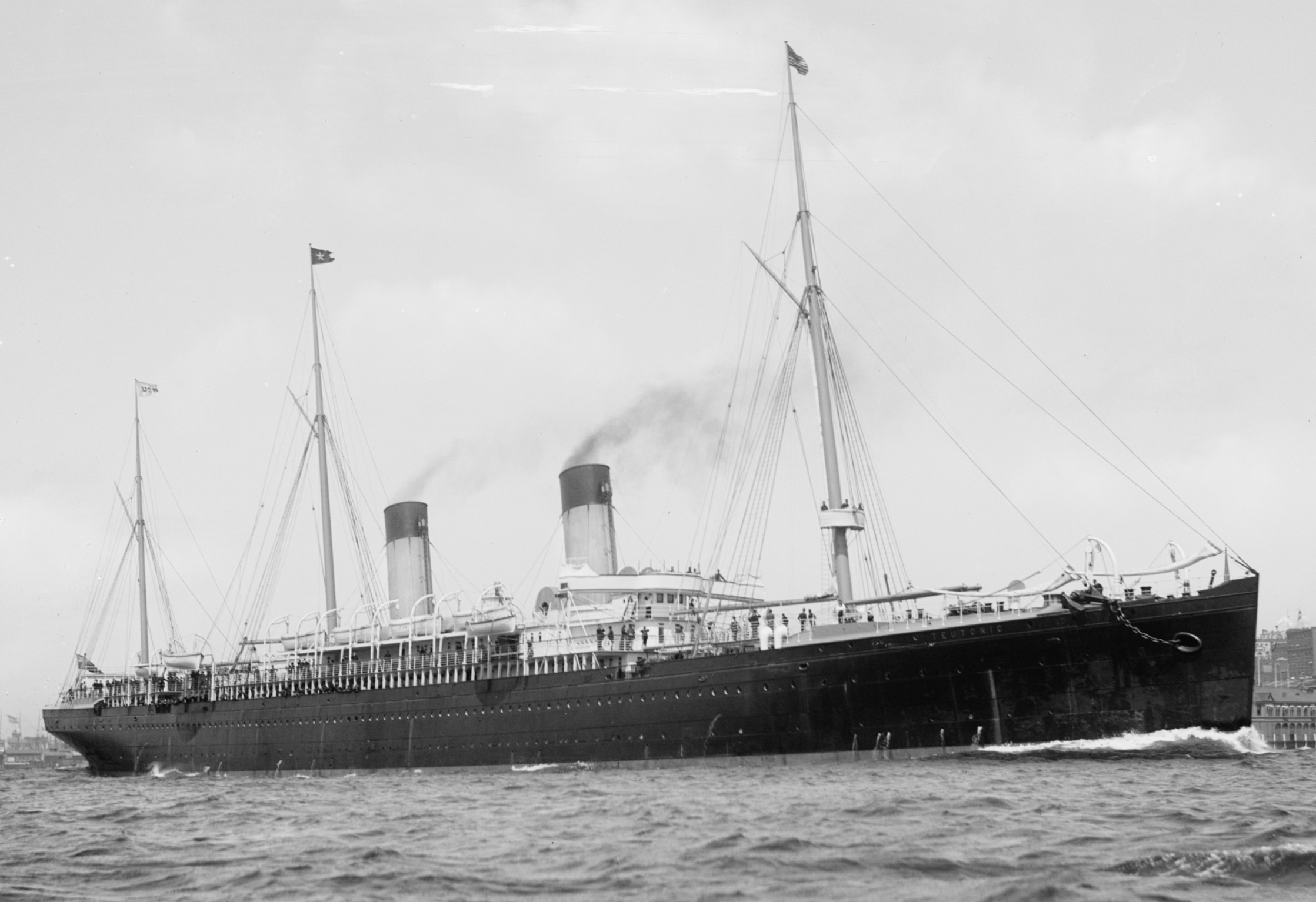
Teutonic of 1889 (9,984 GRT)

Over the next 12 years, White Star focused their attention on other matters of business, expanding their services with the introduction of several cargo and livestock carriers on the North Atlantic as well as establishing a small but lucrative passenger and cargo service to New Zealand. By 1887 however, Britannic and Germanic and the four remaining Oceanic-class liners had aged significantly and were now being outpaced in speed and comfort by newer ships brought into service by White Star's competitors, in particular City of New York and City of Paris. In an effort to outdo their competitors, White Star began making plans to put two new liners into service which would prove to be exceptionally innovative in design for the time, Teutonic and Majestic. In order to build these new ships, Thomas Ismay made arrangements with the British Government under which in exchange for financial support from the British government, the two new ships would be designed not only as passenger liners, but also as armed merchant cruisers which could be requisitioned by the Royal Navy in times of war. Measuring 565 ft (172 m) in length and 57 ft (17 m) in width and with a gross tonnage of just under 10,000 tons, the new liners would be nearly twice the size of Britannic and Germanic. Additionally, owing to the arrangement with the British Government, Teutonic and Majestic were the first White Star liners to be built with twin screws, powered by triple expansion engines capable of driving the ships at speeds of up to 19 knots (35 km/h; 22 mph).

Teutonic and Majestic were designed with accommodations for 1,490 passengers in three classes across four decks, titled 'Promenade', 'Upper', 'Saloon' and 'Main'; with 300 in First Class, 190 in Second Class and 1,000 in Third Class. Accommodations for passengers were based on the level of comfort on these sections of a ship. Those closer to the center axis of motion on a vessel felt little to no discomfort in rough seas. However those located near the bow and stern would experience every swell, wave and motion in addition to the noise of the engines in steerage. First Class accommodations were located amidships on all four decks, with Second Class located abaft of first on the three uppermost decks on Teutonic and all four decks on Majestic, with Third Class located at the far forward and aft ends of the vessel on the Saloon and Main decks.

One notable development associated with the introduction of these two new ships was that they were the first White Star liners to incorporate the three-class passenger system. Prior to this, White Star had made small attempts to enter the market for Second Class passengers on the North Atlantic by adding limited spaces for Second Class passengers on their older liners. Spaces for Second Class were added to Adriatic in 1884, Celtic in 1887 and Republic in 1888, often occupying one or two compartments formerly occupied by steerage berths.

In March 1887, the first keel plates of Teutonic were laid at Harland & Wolff, while construction on Majestic commenced the following September. Construction on the two liners progressed in roughly six-month intervals, with Teutonic being launched in January 1889 and sailing on her maiden voyage to New York the following August; while Majestic was launched in June 1889 and entered service in April 1890. Prior to her entry into service, Teutonic made a rather noteworthy appearance at the 1889 Naval Review at Spithead. Although she could not take part in the actual review due to scheduling commitments, she briefly anchored amidst a line of merchant ships awaiting review, complete with four guns mounted, during which time she was toured by the Prince of Wales and Kaiser Wilhelm II. The Kaiser, impressed by what he saw, is rumored to have mentioned to others in his party that "We must have one of these!". They would be White Star's last speed record breakers, as both ships would capture the Blue Riband in the summer of 1891 within two weeks of each other. Majestic beat the westbound record on 5 August 1891, arriving in New York in 5 days, 18 hours and 8 minutes after keeping an average speed of 20.1 knots (37.2 km/h; 23.1 mph). This record was beaten by Teutonic, which arrived in New York on 19 August and beat the previous record by 1 hour and 37 minutes, maintaining an average speed of 20.35 knots (37.69 km/h; 23.42 mph).

With the introduction of Teutonic and Majestic, White Star disposed of some of their aging ships to make room for the new ships. Prior to the completion of the two new ships, Baltic and Republic were both sold to the Holland America Line and respectively renamed Veendam and Maasdam, after which they were put into service on the company's main trans-Atlantic route between Rotterdam and New York. Veendam was lost at sea without loss of life after striking a submerged object in 1898, while Maasdam was again sold in 1902 to La Veloce Navigazione Italiana and renamed Citta di Napoli, after which she was used as an emigrant ship for an additional eight years before being sold for scrap at Genoa in 1910. In 1893, by which time Teutonic and Majestic had established themselves on the North Atlantic run, White Star sold Celtic to the Danish Thingvalla Line, who renamed her Amerika and attempted to use her for their own emigrant service from Copenhagen to New York. This, however, failed to prove profitable for the line and she was sold for scrap at Brest in 1898.

==== Cymric and the move from speed to comfort ====
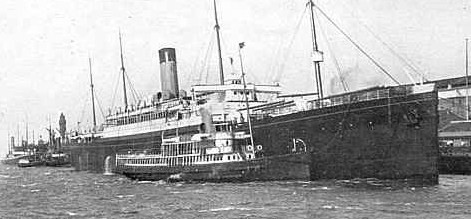
Cymric of 1897 (12,552 GRT)

Beginning in the late 1890s, White Star experienced an explosion of rapid growth and expansion of its services, highlighted by a dramatic shift in focus from building the fastest ships on the North Atlantic to building the most comfortable and luxurious. Their first step in this direction came in 1897 during the construction of a new ship, Cymric. Initially designed as an enlarged version of the livestock carrier Georgic, which had entered service in 1895, Cymric had been planned as a combination passenger and livestock carrier, and thus was not designed with engines necessary to qualify her for the express service maintained by Britannic, Germanic, Teutonic and Majestic. However, while she was under construction at Harland & Wolff, a decision was made to convert spaces aboard her designated for cattle into Third Class accommodations after it was deemed that carrying passengers and livestock aboard the same vessel would likely not prove a popular venture. Therefore, in addition to the accommodations planned for 258 First Class passengers, her designs were altered to include berthing for 1,160 Third Class passengers.

Cymric was an example of a new type of ocean liners that focused on a more luxurious experience. A typical ocean liner during this era was a microcosmic city. Inhabitants hailed from all levels and areas of various social spectra. Regardless of class or wealth, each passenger received the same core service: passage to the destination. Overall, her modest layout and design placed her between the elderly but well reputable Britannic and Germanic and the more modern Teutonic and Majestic. Measuring just over 13,000 tons and with a length of 585 ft (178 m) and a beam of 64 ft (20 m), she was to be the largest liner in the White Star fleet. Additionally, her more utilitarian appearance with a single funnel and four masts contrasted against her four running mates considerably. Due to this design, she was considered the first of White Star's 'intermediate' liners. However, as a result of this partial transition from livestock carrier to passenger liner, Cymric came to attain several noteworthy advantages which White Star would employ on several other liners. While her passenger accommodations had been modified, the specifications of her machinery and engines were left in place. Like Teutonic and Majestic, Cymric was fitted with twin screws, but was instead powered by quadruple expansion engines capable of achieving a modest speed of 15 knots (28 km/h; 17 mph) commonly seen in cargo and livestock carriers of that time. The major difference was that because these engines were designed for more modest speeds, they were considerably smaller and required only seven boilers, leaving more space within the hull for passenger and crew accommodations. At the same time, this also meant she consumed much less coal than steamers designed with larger engines, making her more economical. Cymric was launched at Harland & Wolff in October 1897 and entered service in February 1898, and in time proved a popular and profitable addition to the fleet.

==== Oceanic and the death of Thomas Ismay ====
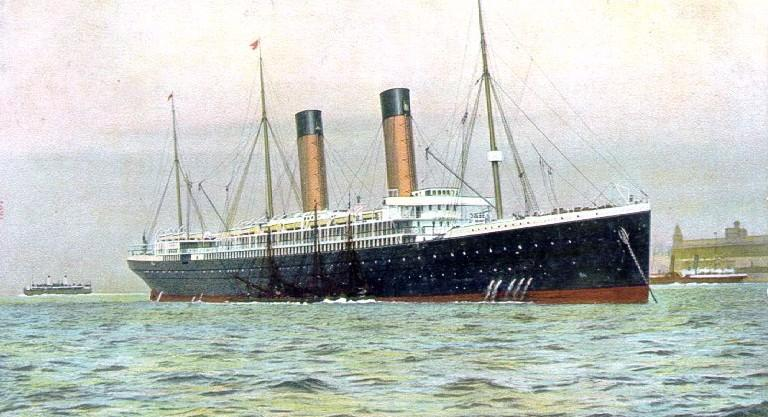
Oceanic of 1899 (17,272 GRT)

In the early months of 1897, while Cymric was still under construction at Harland & Wolff, it became clear to Thomas Ismay and other company officials that a new addition to the North Atlantic fleet was needed, as White Star's fleet was starting to lag behind those of their competitors, such as Cunard and Norddeutscher Lloyd. By this point, the only remaining ship of the original Oceanic class of liners was Adriatic, which had been in service for 25 years and was starting to show her age. Britannic and Germanic were equally outdated, and with advancements in shipbuilding during the 1890s, Teutonic and Majestic had been eclipsed by several newer vessels, most recently by Norddeutscher Lloyd's Kaiser Wilhelm der Grosse. In response, Ismay and his partners at Harland & Wolff set out to design two new liners for the North Atlantic run which would, in a fashion similar to how Teutonic and Majestic had done, go down in shipbuilding history.

The new steamers, which were intended to be named Oceanic and Olympic, were designed to be both the largest and most luxurious the world had ever seen. In March 1897, the first keel plates for Oceanic were laid at Harland & Wolff, but almost immediately problems arose. Due to the fact that a vessel of this size had never been built, work on the ship was delayed until an overhead gantry crane could be built. Her launch on 14 January 1899 drew an immense crowd of spectators numbering more than 50,000, as Oceanic would be the last British transatlantic liner to be launched in the 19th century, as well as the first to exceed the Great Eastern in length. She measured 704 ft (215 m) in length, with a beam of 68 ft (21 m) and had a gross register tonnage of 17,254, making her a full 42% larger than Norddeutscher Lloyd's Kaiser Wilhelm Der Grosse. Like Teutonic and Majestic, Oceanic was designed with capabilities to be converted to an armed merchant cruiser in time of war if needed, specifications for which caused her to be built with a double-plated hull and turrets on her upper decks which could be quickly mounted with guns. She was also built with triple expansion engines geared to twin screws capable of achieving a respectable, if not record breaking, service speed of 19 knots (35 km/h; 22 mph). Additionally, she had a considerably larger passenger capacity of just over 1,700, providing for 410 First Class, 300 Second Class and 1,000 Third Class passengers.

Oceanic sailed on her maiden voyage from Liverpool on 6 September 1899, arriving in New York to much fanfare on the morning of 13 September with 1,456 passengers aboard, many of whom were satisfied with how the crossing had gone. Among those travelling aboard in First Class were Harland & Wolff's managing director, Lord Pirrie, and Thomas Andrews, who had designed Oceanic under Thomas Ismay's direction. At the same time Oceanic had departed from Liverpool, a fireman's strike had been ensuing at the docks, which in turn meant she sailed with a boiler room crew consisting of fewer men than her specifications called for. Thus, during her maiden voyage, she maintained an average speed of just under 19 knots (35 km/h; 22 mph).

Thomas Ismay was unable to enjoy the fruits of his labour. Just a few weeks after Oceanic was launched, he began complaining of pains in his chest, from whence his health steadily began to decline. In fact, his health began to deteriorate so rapidly that managers of both White Star and Harland & Wolff decided to cancel plans to construct Olympic. The name was shelved, only to be reused 12 years later. His health improved for a brief time, allowing him to visit Oceanic upon her completion in Belfast that July. During his visit, Belfast officials awarded him with a key to the city, citing his contributions to the local economy and to British merchant shipping. Unfortunately, in late August he took a turn for the worse and he underwent two operations to alleviate his ailment, both of which proved unsuccessful, and he suffered a heart attack on 14 September. He lingered in worsening agony for another ten weeks until his death on 23 November 1899 at the age of 62. In the immediate aftermath, control of the company was passed to Thomas' son Bruce, who was named chairman of the line.

=== The Boer War and the Big Four ===
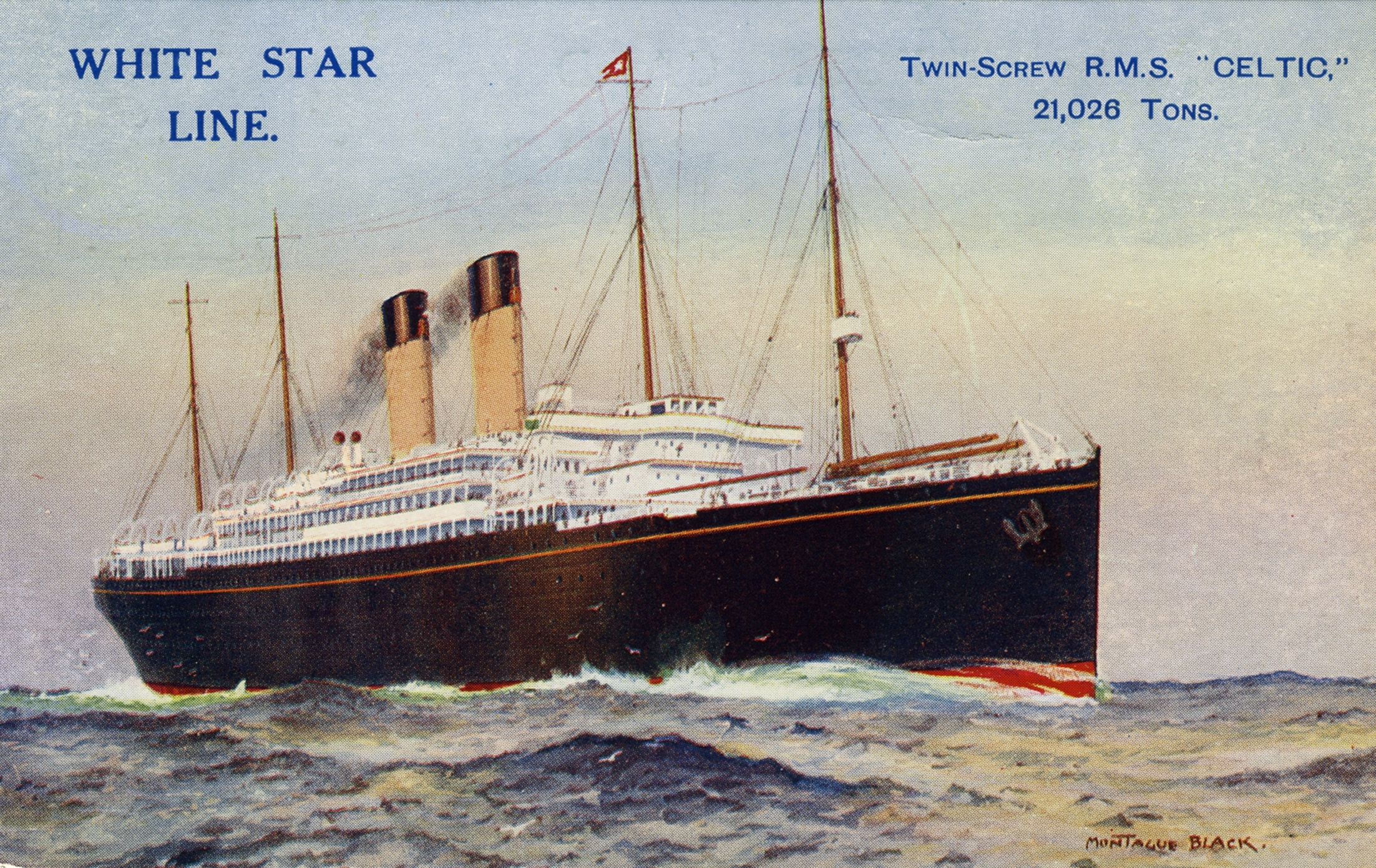
Celtic of 1901 (20,904 GRT)

With the death of Thomas Ismay, his eldest son, Bruce, took over. He was joined at the helm of Ismay, Imrie & Co. by his friend Harold Sanderson in addition to the members already present, notably the now elderly William Imrie and his brother, James Ismay. The company was quickly involved in the Second Boer War, with several of its ships being requisitioned, starting with the cargo ship Nomadic in October 1899. Several ships quickly followed, notably Britannic, which had become surplus to requirements on the North Atlantic route. A total of ten ships were assisting in the war effort, six of them as part of their regular service. 17,000 men and 4,000 animals were transported to the conflict by White Star ships in just over two years.

Even before Oceanic had been completed, White Star had already started making plans for a considerably larger addition to their fleet. In September 1898, before his health began failing, Thomas Ismay negotiated the terms for the orders for the last passenger liner he would ever order for the line he had built. This time, plans were essentially the same as they had been with Oceanic, only taking considerably more steps in innovation. While staying with the trend in focusing more on comfort than speed as had been set with Cymric and Oceanic, Ismay's plans called for a new passenger liner of dimensions the world had never seen, and her chosen name was to be Celtic (1901), a name taken and reused from the original Oceanic class. The initial designs for Celtic had her at 680 ft (210 m) in length, slightly shorter than Oceanic, but with a greater breadth of 75 ft (23 m). Additionally, while Oceanic had set the record for length, Celtic would triumph in tonnage, measuring just over 20,000 tons.

==== Engines ====
One point of interest about this new ship was in regard to her engines. A comparison was made between the machinery installed aboard Cymric and that placed in Oceanic. Due to Cymric initially being designed as a livestock carrier, she was built with smaller engines capable of modest speeds which both consumed less coal and occupied less space within the hull. As a result, there was an astonishing difference which gave Cymric a considerable advantage over Oceanic. Although Cymric was only about two-thirds of the size of Oceanic in terms of gross tonnage (12,552 to 17,274), her net tonnage, a unit of measurement used to account for space aboard a ship usable for passengers and cargo was actually greater than that of the larger vessel (8,123 net tons aboard Cymric compared to only 6,996 with the Oceanic). Builders and designers used this as a baseline for engine designs for Celtic. She was to be equipped with quadruple expansion engines geared to twin screws capable of modest speeds of just over 16 knots (30 km/h; 18 mph). As she was geared to lower service speeds, her coal consumption was far less at only 260 tons per day, which compared to the 400 tons per day needed to power Oceanic, made her much more economical. At the same time, owing to her broad hull, she was designed with cargo holds capable of storing up to 18,500 tons of commercial cargo, a strategic placement in her design as that cargo was to serve as ballast, keeping her steady in even the roughest seas.

==== Capacities ====
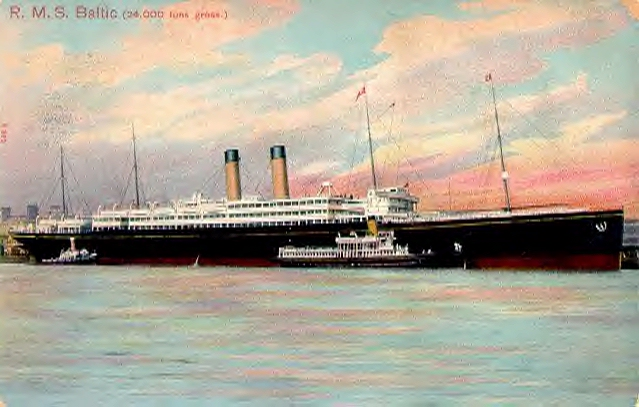
Baltic of 1904 (23,876 GRT)

Additionally, Celtic was to be designed with far greater capacities for both passengers and cargo. Her plans called for accommodations for a staggering 2,859 passengers: 347 in First Class, 160 in Second Class, and a total of 2,352 in Third Class, the latter being the largest capacity seen on any liner on the North Atlantic at the time. Passenger accommodations were spread across six decks, titled from top to bottom: Boat Deck (A Deck), Upper Promenade (B Deck), Promenade (C Deck), Saloon (D Deck), Upper (E Deck) and Lower (F Deck). First Class accommodations were located amidships on the uppermost four decks and included a lounge and smoke room on the Boat Deck, as well as a grand and spacious dining room on the Saloon Deck. Second Class accommodations were allocated to the starboard sides of the Saloon and Upper Decks. As seen aboard Teutonic, Majestic, and Oceanic, Second Class passengers were provided with their own smoke room and library, housed within a separate deckhouse situated just aft of the main superstructure, directly above their dining room on the Saloon deck.

What made Celtic rather exceptional was her Third Class accommodations, which in addition to ample open deck space on the Promenade Deck, were located on the Saloon, Upper and Lower Decks at both the forward and aft ends of the vessel, with a vast majority being located aft. The pattern followed that seen on all White Star vessels on the North Atlantic, with single men berthed forward and single women, married couples and families berthed aft. On the Saloon Deck, in addition to baths and lavatories both forward and aft, were two large dining rooms at the far after end of the deck, situated side by side, which when not in use functioned as smoke and general rooms. An additional, fairly larger dining room was located directly beneath these on the Upper Deck, while a fourth dining room was located forward where single men were to be berthed, for which this dining room was equipped with a service bar. Aside from this, the biggest change brought by Celtic for Third Class passengers was in sleeping quarters. Open berths were still fairly common on the North Atlantic, which White Star had from the start gradually shied away from. Aboard the Oceanic-class liners, Britannic and Germanic, steerage passengers had been provided with large rooms which generally slept around 20 people, while aboard Teutonic and Majestic the usage of two and four berth cabins had been introduced, but only for married couples and families with children, a policy which also held with Cymric and Oceanic. Celtic broke that mould. At the forward end of the vessel, located in two compartments on the Lower Deck were accommodations of the older style of sleeping arrangements, each compartment providing for 300 single men. The remaining 1,752 berths were located aft, all of which consisted of two, four and six berth cabins.

==== Construction ====
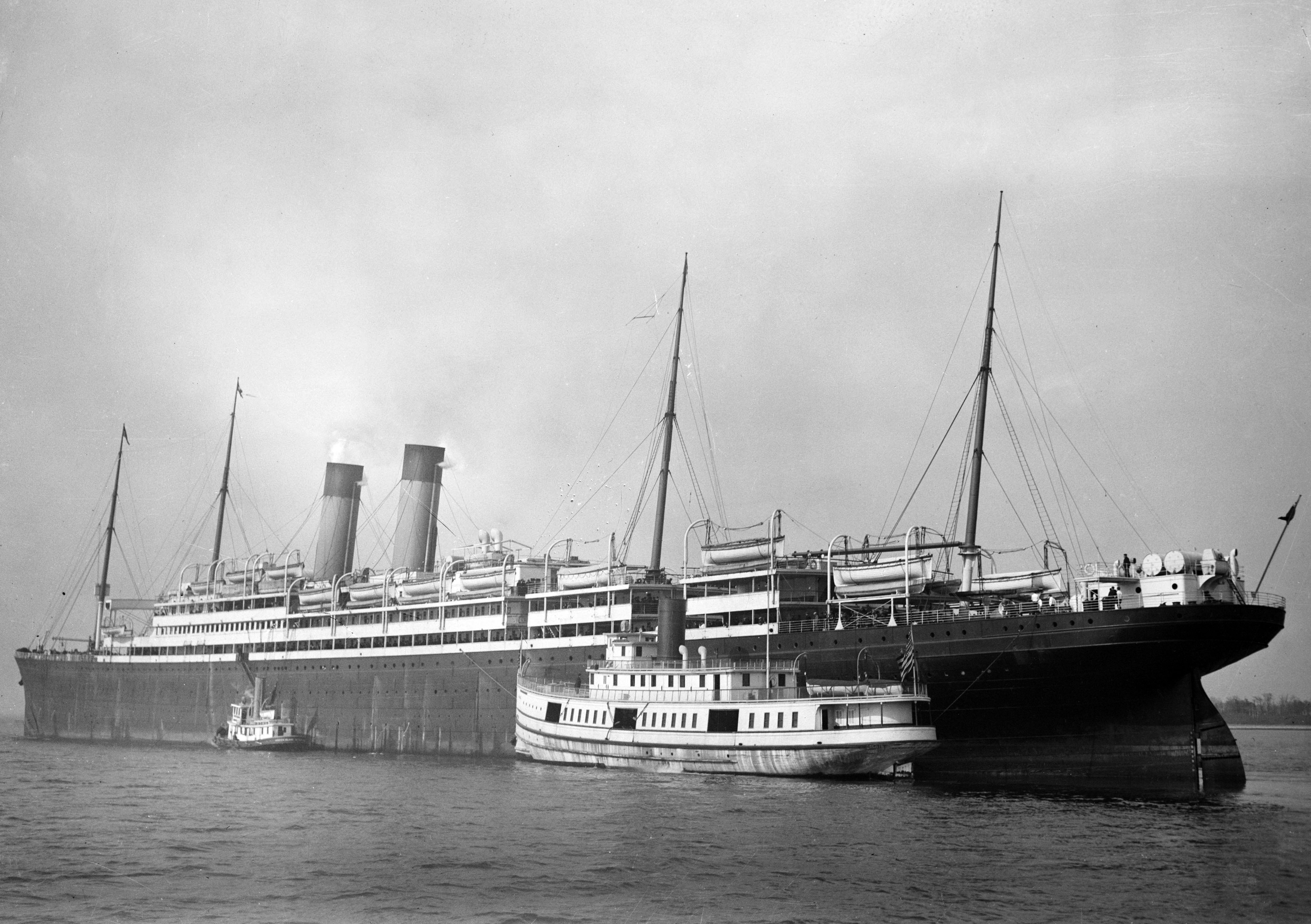
Adriatic of 1906 (24,679 GRT)

On 22 March 1899, just two months after Oceanic was launched, the first keel plates of Celtic were laid at Harland & Wolff. Construction progressed rapidly, and as White Star had planned, the new fleet of liners would be constructed in overlapping succession. In October 1900, while Celtic's hull was nearing completion, construction began on the second ship, Cedric. When Celtic was launched in April 1901, there was much fanfare, as she was the largest ship in the world in terms of tonnage, as well as being the first to exceed the tonnage of the infamous Great Eastern. She took a mere four additional months for fitting out before sailing on her maiden voyage from Liverpool on 26 July of that year. Upon her entry into service, one of her most attractive features was her seaworthiness. It was noted that she was "as steady as the Rock of Gibraltar."

Meanwhile, construction on Cedric had proceeded as planned and she was launched on 21 August 1902. Although she was of exactly the same dimensions as Celtic in length and width, she outweighed her twin by a mere 155 tons, making her the largest ship in the world. Despite their similarities, the two had distinct differences. First Class accommodations aboard Cedric included more private bathrooms, as well as more suites consisting of interconnecting cabins provided with sitting rooms. She had accommodations for a total of 2,600 passengers, with a slightly increased number of First Class passengers at 350, her Second Class capacity was increased to 250 and Third Class was scaled back to approximately 2,000. Cedric entered service later that winter, departing Liverpool on her maiden voyage on 11 February 1903.

The keel of the third ship, Baltic, had been laid down at Harland & Wolff in June 1902, while construction on Cedric was still underway. One notable instance in her construction was once her keel was fitted in place, White Star gave orders for her length to be extended by 28 ft (8.5 m). This change in plans required builders to cut her keel in two to install the added length. The reason for this addition was likely to provide more space for passenger accommodations, which added up to 2,850 passengers. Although Baltic was designed with the same layout for Third Class passengers as Cedric, with a capacity of 2,000, her First and Second Class capacities were significantly greater. First Class was increased to a capacity of 425 passengers, while capacity for Second Class was extended to 450 passengers, almost twice that of Cedric and three times that of Celtic. Simultaneously, the added length also increased her gross tonnage to 23,884, making her the largest ship in the world. Baltic was launched on 12 November 1903, subsequently fitted out and delivered to White Star on 23 June 1904, sailing on her maiden voyage on 29 June.

While the first three members of the highly regarded quartet of liners were built and put into service with little problem, the fourth and final ship, Adriatic, experienced a considerable delay in her construction. Initially, her construction had commenced in November 1902 while Baltic was still being built, but a series of delays slowed her construction to a snail's pace compared to that of her sisters. Baltic was launched after roughly 17 months, but by the time Adriatic was finally launched in September 1906, she had been under construction for almost 46 months, more than twice the time needed to construct her sisters. Her passenger accommodations followed the same trend as seen with Baltic, with added focus on the upper two classes while still maintaining the high standard for Third Class. Her overall passenger capacity was also identical to that of Baltic at 2,850, but with differences in capacities for each class, with First Class increased to 450, Second Class increased to 500 and Third Class scaled back to 1,900. Unlike her sisters however, she was unable to attain the title of world's largest ship at the time of her completion, as her 24,451 gross register tonnage was just barely outmatched by Hamburg Amerika's Kaiserin Auguste Victoria, which measured 24,581 tons and entered service four months prior to the launch of Adriatic. She would, however, rank briefly as the largest British-built ship until Cunard's Lusitania entered service the following year. She sailed on her maiden voyage to New York on 8 May 1907, and not long afterwards gained a considerable reputation for her interiors, enough for the British tabloid The Bystander to dub her 'The Liner Luxurious'. One of her most notable innovations was that she was the first liner to have an onboard Victorian Turkish bath and swimming pool.

==== Integration into the trust of J.P. Morgan ====
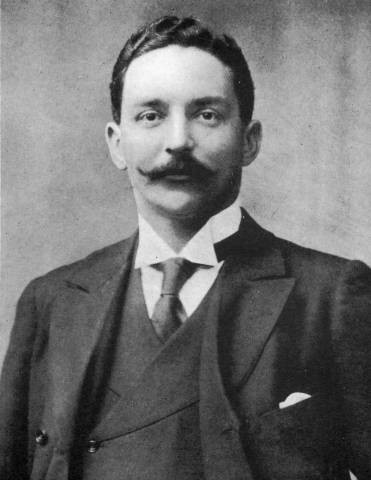
J. Bruce Ismay

As White Star gradually brought the 'Big Four' into service, they also acquired several smaller 'intermediate' liners in preparation for a considerable expansion of their passenger services on the North Atlantic. In 1903 alone they came to obtain five new liners, beginning with Arabic. Originally laid down as Minnewaska for the Atlantic Transport Line, she was transferred to White Star prior to completion and was launched under her new name on 18 December 1902. Similar in size and appearance to Cymric with a single funnel and four masts, she measured 600 ft (180 m) in length with a beam of 65 ft (20 m), assessed at 15,801 gross register tons with quadruple expansion engines geared to twin screws capable of a service speed of 16 knots (30 km/h; 18 mph). She was fitted with fairly modest accommodations for 1,400 passengers: 200 in First Class, 200 in Second Class and 1,000 in Third Class. She sailed on her maiden voyage from Liverpool to New York on 26 June 1903.

In 1902, White Star Line was bought by the International Mercantile Marine Co. (IMM), owned by the American banker John Pierpont Morgan. He hoped to obtain a monopoly of the North Atlantic route by buying several shipping companies, and by entering into agreements with others such as the German HAPAG and the Norddeutscher Lloyd. The acquisition of the White Star Line was one of its major takeovers. In order to close the deal, Morgan offered the shareholders of the company ten times the value of the profits generated in 1900, which was a very good year for the company. The Ismay family were initially reluctant to accept, knowing that Thomas Ismay would have radically opposed the idea if he were still alive. However, J. Bruce Ismay ultimately agreed with the shareholders. His brother, as well as two of the five other directors of Ismay, Imrie & Company left the company at this time, and Ismay and Harold Sanderson were quickly joined by William James Pirrie, the director of Harland & Wolff. Pirrie and Ismay were also among the thirteen directors of IMM.

Despite the good fortunes of its main subsidiary, the IMM was experiencing great difficulties and was struggling in particular to repay its debts to shipyards. Much effort was needed to get IMM on its feet, efforts that its aging president, Clement Griscom, did not believe he could do. In 1904, it was proposed that Ismay replace him, which he reluctantly accepted on condition of having Morgan's full support.

=== Intermediate liners and rapid expansion ===
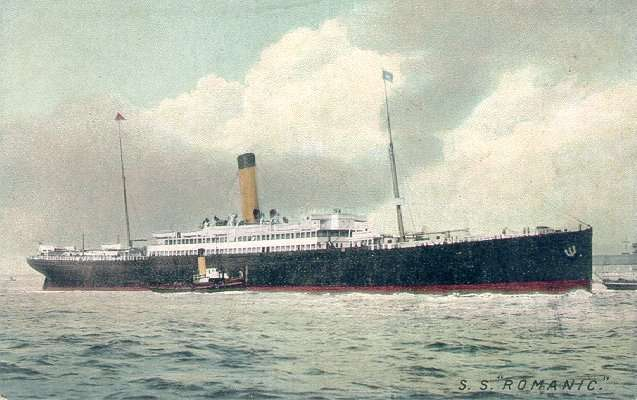
Romanic of 1903 (11,394 GRT)

Meanwhile, as a result of the IMM takeover, White Star obtained four newly completed liners in the last months of 1903, Columbus, Commonwealth, New England and Mayflower. These four liners had been owned and operated by the Dominion Line for their services between Liverpool and Boston as well as their Mediterranean cruising and emigrant route, which also connected to Boston. However, the Dominion Line was also absorbed into IMM and the four ships were transferred to White Star. In addition to the acquisition of these ships, White Star also acquired control of the routes as well. Upon their acquisition by White Star, the four liners were respectively renamed Republic, Cretic, Romanic and Canopic. These four ships were greatly similar in appearance to the Cymric and Arabic, all with a single funnel with two or four masts, with engines geared to twin screws capable of service speeds between 14 and 16 knots (26 and 30 km/h; 16 and 18 mph). They all also fell within the same range in terms of dimensions, with lengths between 550 and 582 ft (168 and 177 m), beams between 59 and 67 ft (18 and 20 m), and similar gross tonnage. There was, however, considerable variances in passenger capacities. Republic, which in time would come to obtain the nickname 'The Millionaires' Ship', had the largest capacity with accommodations for 2,400 passengers (200 First Class, 200 Second Class, 2,000 Third Class). The three remaining ships had considerably smaller capacities, with the Cretic designed with accommodations for 1,510 passengers (260 First Class, 250 Second Class, 1,000 Third Class), Romanic with accommodations for 1,200 passengers (200 First Class, 200 Second Class, 800 Third Class) and Canopic with accommodations for 1,277 passengers (275 First Class, 232 Second Class, 770 Third Class).

Following the conclusion of their service under Dominion Line in late 1903, the four liners were briefly withdrawn from service. Their names were changed, their funnels were repainted into White Star colors, and they were made ready for their new services. Romanic was the first to enter service under White Star, sailing for Boston on 19 November, followed by Cretic on 26 November. In order to balance the schedule between the Liverpool and Mediterranean services to Boston, Cymric was transferred to the Liverpool-Boston route, departing Liverpool for her first trip to Boston on 10 December, while Republic entered service to Boston on 17 December. Canopic completed the service upon her departure from Liverpool on 14 January 1904. Upon their arrivals in Boston, Romanic and Canopic were both immediately transferred to the Mediterranean services formerly run by the Dominion Line. This route followed a line which first made port at Sao Miguel in the Azores before passing through the straits of Gibraltar and making port in Naples and Genoa. Republic was also put into service on the Mediterranean route following her first crossing to Boston, but only for the first half of the 1904 season, and was switched back to the Liverpool-Boston service until winter, a pattern she would follow for the remainder of her career. Cretic remained on the Liverpool-Boston service running opposite Cymric for a full year until November 1904, when alongside Republic she began sailing on the secondary service to the Mediterranean from New York.

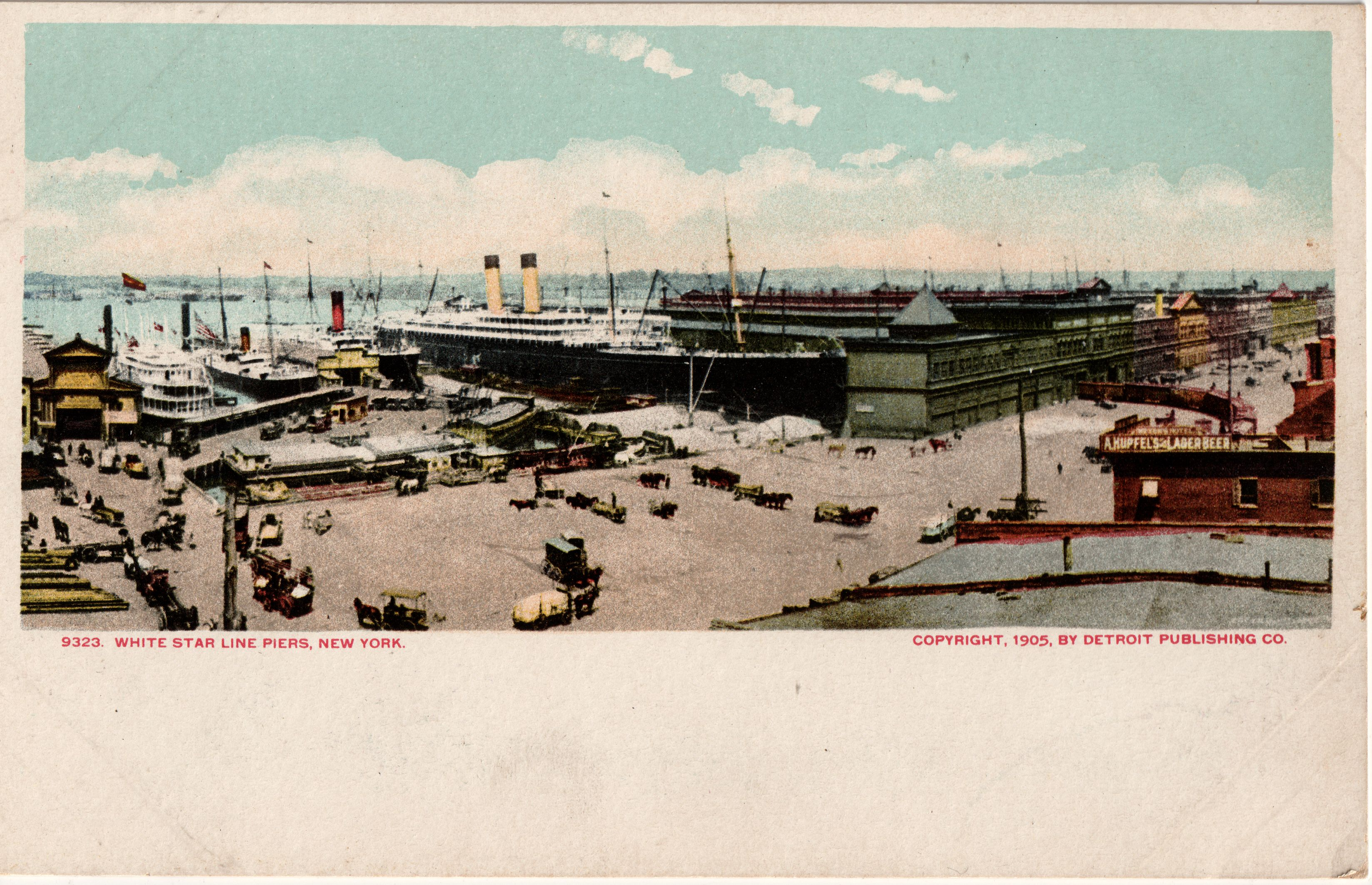
White Star Line piers in New York about 1905

In the early months of 1907, White Star began preparations for another extension of their services on the North Atlantic by establishing an 'express' service to New York. The new service would depart Southampton every Wednesday, first heading south across the English Channel to the French port of Cherbourg that evening, then sailing back across the channel to Queenstown the following morning before proceeding to New York. On eastbound crossings, ships would forego calling at Queenstown and make port at Plymouth, before proceeding to Cherbourg and Southampton. Due to its proximity to London, Southampton had a clear advantage over Liverpool in reducing travelling time, while by creating a terminal at Cherbourg White Star had established a route which allowed passengers to embark or disembark at either a British or Continental port. Another subsidiary of IMM, the American Line, had moved their operations to Southampton in 1893 and established an express service via Cherbourg which had proved very successful, thus prompting White Star to make a similar move. Celtic embarked on two experimental crossings from Southampton to New York via Cherbourg and Queenstown, first on 20 April and then again on 18 May, which proved successful and set the way for the establishment of the route, which was to be maintained by Teutonic, Majestic, Oceanic and the newly completed Adriatic. Celtic was returned to the Liverpool service after the second crossing, and her place taken on the new run by Adriatic, which sailed from Southampton for the first time on 5 June, followed by Teutonic on 12 June, Oceanic on 19 June and Majestic on 26 June.

=== Olympic-class ships ===
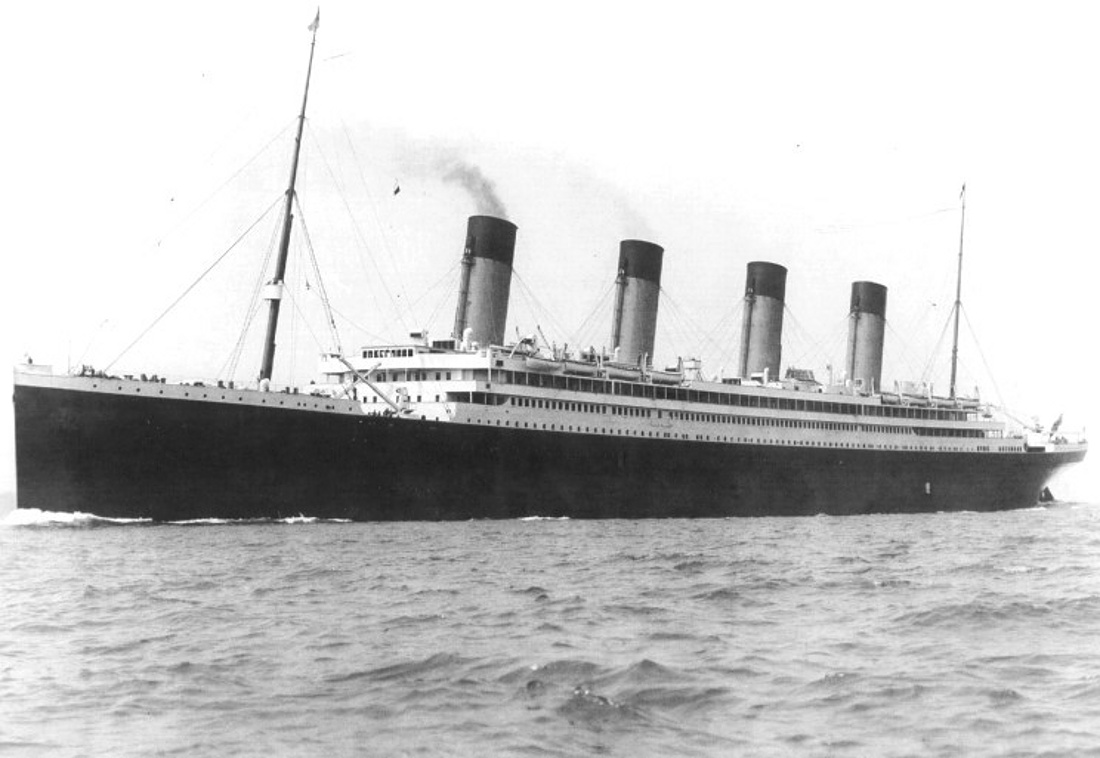
Olympic of 1910 (45,324 GRT)

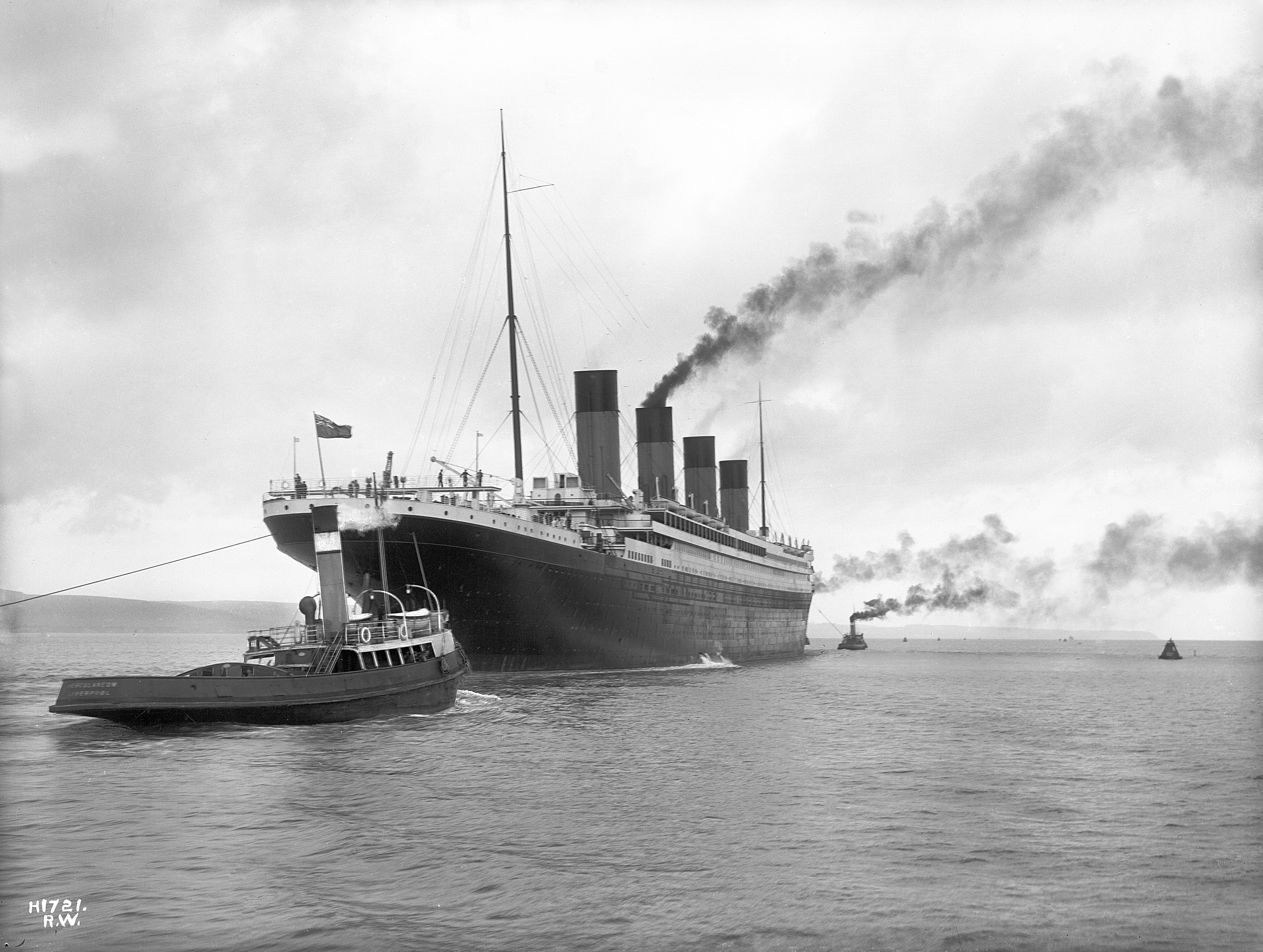
Titanic with tugboats, undergoing sea trials

White Star moved their express service from Liverpool to Southampton in 1907, providing them with the advantage of a continental stopover in Cherbourg that allowed the vessel to take on more passengers. This service was initially provided by Teutonic, Majestic, Oceanic and Adriatic, the latter being slower but able to carry many more passengers. A ferry, the Gallic, was also purchased to help board passengers and luggage during the French stopover. This solution was only temporary, however, and the company was already planning the arrival of much larger and faster vessels in order to establish a regular and more efficient service.

While Harland & Wolff started construction of the new Olympic class, White Star continued to diversify its activities. Its establishment in Southampton led to a price war between companies, which drastically reduced its third-class fares. It was at this point that the North Atlantic Conference was created to regulate fares and crossings according to demand. In 1909, White Star took over part of the activities of the Dominion Line, another IMM company serving Canada. Two of this company's ships, then under construction, were transferred to White Star and became Laurentic and Megantic, bringing the company into the Canadian route. These two ships also served as a testing ground for the propulsion method of the Olympic-class liners.

When she entered service in June 1911, Olympic was an immediate and highly satisfactory success, with White Star ordering a third ship, Britannic. The initial success was quickly disrupted. On 20 September 1911, Olympic was damaged following a collision with the cruiser HMS Hawke, which led to her return to the shipyard for lengthy repairs and the postponement of the entry into service of Titanic.

Titanic eventually entered service in April 1912, but her career would be short-lived. She was lost after striking an iceberg on her maiden voyage, leading to the deaths of around 1,500 people. The impact on public opinion was considerable.

The sinking of Titanic caused a small loss of confidence in large liners, which had to be equipped with additional lifeboats. Olympic suffered a mutiny shortly after the sinking, when some of her stokers expressed concern about the seaworthiness of her hastily installed collapsible lifeboats and refused to work. The ship was withdrawn from service in October 1912 and was extensively refitted to improve her safety in light of Titanic′s sinking. She returned to service in March 1913. Construction of Britannic was postponed in order to allow the lessons learned from the sinking of her sister to be implemented into her design.

=== War and reparations (1914–1926) ===
==== World War I ====
When World War I broke out, the White Star fleet became involved in the war. At the time, it controlled 35 ships, and all served in the war effort, either by being directly commissioned by the Royal Navy, or within the framework of the Liner Requisition Act. In these conditions, the losses were numerous. The route from Southampton was stopped in order to avoid losses, and only Baltic and Adriatic remained on the route from Liverpool to New York, quickly joined by ships loaned from the Red Star Line: Lapland, Zeeland, and Vaderland.

Oceanic, Teutonic, Celtic and Cedric were quickly converted into auxiliary cruisers, and joined the 10th Squadron of the Royal Navy. Majestic escaped the fighting, its scrapping having begun a few weeks before the start of the conflict. The company's first wartime loss was Oceanic, which ran aground and was lost on 8 September 1914.

The first White Star ship lost to enemy action was Arabic, which was torpedoed off the Irish coast in August 1915 with the loss of 44 lives. November 1916 would see the loss of Britannic, the third and final Olympic-class vessel, which sank near the Greek island of Kea after striking a naval mine while in service as a hospital ship. Britannic was the largest loss for the company, and also the largest ship sunk during the conflict. 1916 also saw the loss of Cymric, which was torpedoed off the Irish coast in May, and also of the cargo ship Georgic, which was scuttled in December with its cargo of 1,200 horses still on board after being intercepted in the Atlantic by the German merchant raider SMS Möwe.

1917 saw the loss of Laurentic in January, which struck a mine off the Irish coast and sank with the loss of 354 lives and 3,211 gold ingots. The following month the liner Afric was sunk by a torpedo in the English Channel, as was Delphic in August. Another large loss came in 1918, when Justicia, a 32,120 GRT liner requisitioned from Holland America Line and operated by White Star, was torpedoed and sunk.

Many White Star ships were requisitioned for various types of war service, most commonly for use as troop ships. The most notable of these was Olympic, which transported over 200,000 troops during the conflict. Some ships, still under construction when the war broke out, were sent into military service unfinished and were not completed until after the war. This was the case with Belgic and Vedic. The company lost ten ships over the course of the conflict, but its fleet carried nearly 550,000 soldiers and four million tons of cargo, and nearly 325 officers, engineers, marshals and medics were decorated during the war. With the end of hostilities, their surviving ships were decommissioned to resume their commercial service.

=== War reparations ===
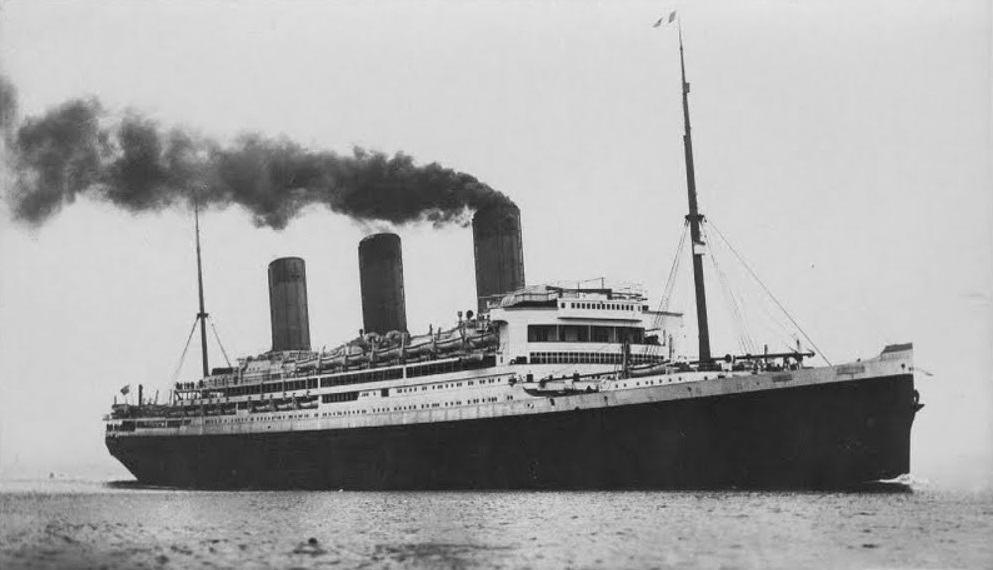
Majestic of 1922 (56,551 GRT)

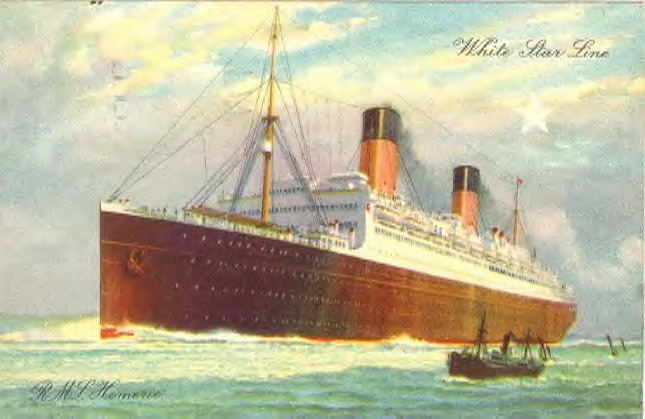
Homeric of 1922 (35,000 GRT)

After the war, the White Star Line found itself in a difficult situation. Of its three Olympic-class giants, only the lead ship remained to resume commercial service. The losses on other routes were also far from negligible. After the end of hostilities in November 1918, the Big Four resumed service from Liverpool with the help of Lapland, Belgic and the briefly chartered Mobile. In July 1919, Cretic and Canopic resumed their Mediterranean service. In September 1919, Lapland and Adriatic reopened the Southampton route. In 1920, Olympic returned to service and displaced Lapland after undergoing an overhaul that included a conversion to oil burning, which was more economical than coal.

After the ships that had survived the conflict returned to service, the company still had to compensate for its losses, which it decided to do by buying as many second-hand ships as possible, and sometimes by lending them to other shipping companies within the IMM. The company bought two cargo ships built as part of the war effort, War Argus and War Priam, which became Gallic and Bardic. They acquired Haverford from the American Line in 1921, as well as Poland from the Red Star Line in 1922.

In 1922, the White Star Line obtained three former German liners which had been ceded to Britain as war reparations under the terms of the Treaty of Versailles, ostensibly as replacements for the war losses of Britannic, Oceanic, Arabic, Cymric and Laurentic. These were the former SS Bismarck, which was renamed Majestic, the former SS Berlin, renamed Arabic, and the former SS Columbus, renamed Homeric. At 56,551 gross register tons, Majestic was then the world's largest liner and became the company's unofficial flagship. The two former German liners operated successfully alongside Olympic on the Southampton–New York route until the Great Depression reduced demand after 1930.

In the immediate post-war period there was a boom in transatlantic migration, from which White Star was able to benefit for a time. However, this trade was badly affected by the Immigration Act of 1924, which introduced quotas for immigrants to the United States. This lowered the profits of the shipping lines, for whom migration had been a source of profit for nearly a century. However, the growth in tourism was to some degree able to offset the decline of migration, and White Star made efforts to appeal to this new kind of travelers by gradually overhauling liners still in service and re-configuring Third Class accommodations as Tourist Class.

==== Exit from the IMM ====
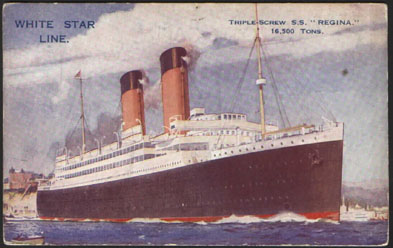
Regina of 1925 (16,231 GRT)

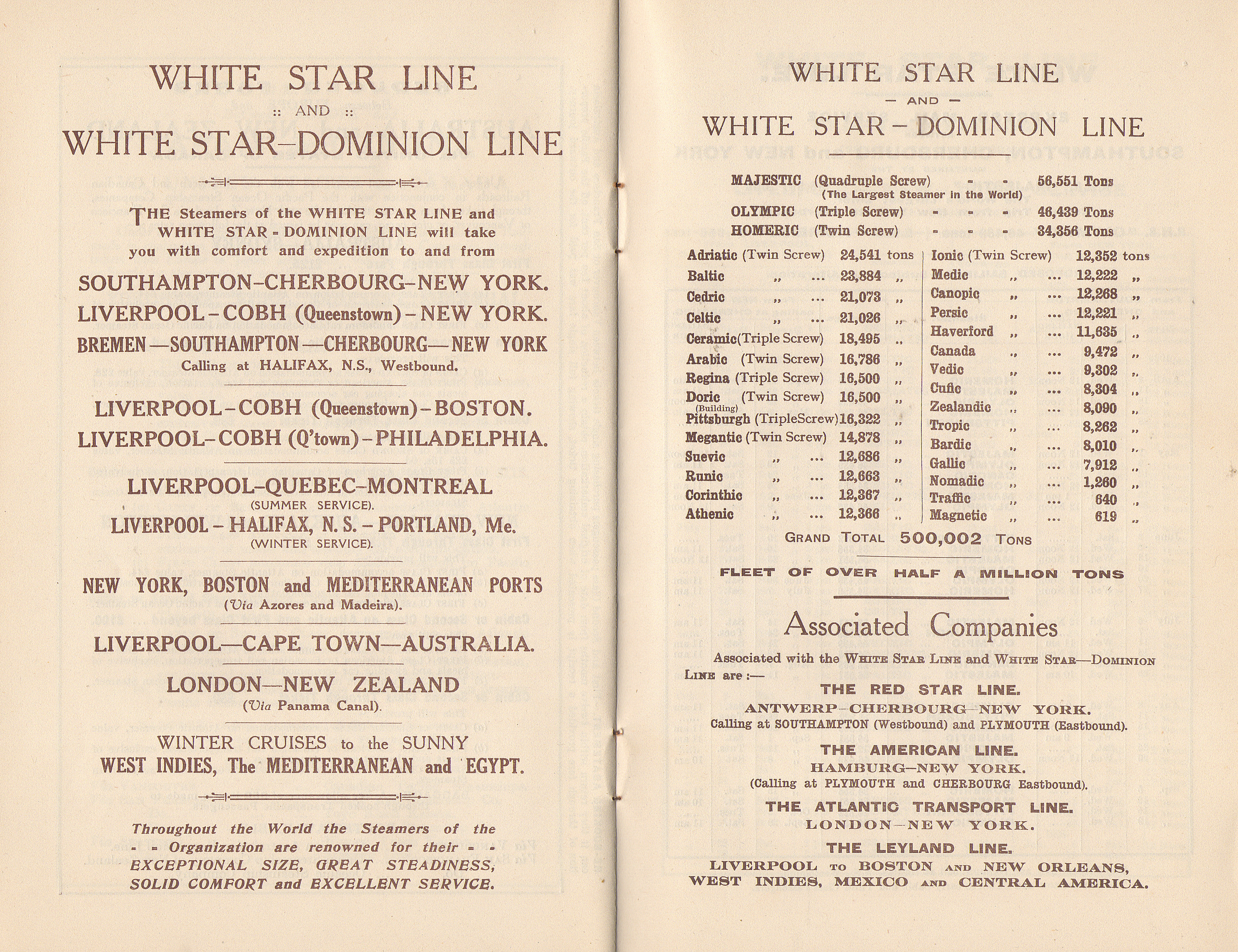
Services and fleet of the White Star Line, 1923

In the post-war period, when the situation of the International Mercantile Marine Co. was precarious, its president, Philip Franklin, saw the exclusion of British companies as a lifeline. Indeed, the presence of these British companies and their ships deprived the trust of American subsidies. At that time, Lord Pirrie and Owen Philipps (known from 1923 as Lord Kylsant) offered £27,000,000 to recover all British property from the trust. U.S. President Woodrow Wilson, however, vetoed at the last minute. The IMM found itself in an all the more delicate position since the White Star Line signed an agreement with the British Board of Trade stipulating that it should not be considered as a foreign ownership. Under this agreement, all directors of the company were to be approved by the Board of Trade, which created a particularly complex situation.

It was under these conditions that the White Star Line pursued its resumption of activities. In 1923, Doric entered service, one of only two ships delivered to the company by Harland & Wolff during the decade. The liner was assigned to a joint service between White Star and the Dominion Line. It was accompanied on this route by Regina, a ship of the IMM. Originally owned by the Leyland Line, it was operated by the Dominion Line before switching to White Star. The ship ended its career under the colors of the Red Star Line. Also in 1923, White Star and its rival Cunard Line reached an agreement to alternate their departures during the winter, in order to use fewer ships during this less profitable season, which was conducive to refitting ships.

Although the transatlantic services of the White Star Line held up well in the 1920s, this was not the case for all services. The Australian route was experiencing more and more difficulties. Relations with IMM became increasingly difficult and, in 1925, the trust again announced that it wanted to separate from its non-American subsidiaries. The sale was initially offered for the price of £7,000,000, derisory compared to its original price, and an agreement seemed to have been reached in the spring with the British group Furness Withy, but the deal ultimately failed.

=== Lord Kylsant and the Great Depression (1927–1934) ===
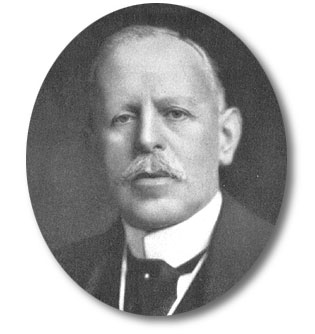
Lord Kylsant

Shortly after, Lord Kylsant intervened in the situation with the IMM. As the head of Harland & Wolff since the death of Lord Pirrie in 1924, he was particularly interested in the White Star Line, to which Harland & Wolff had a close business relationship. In November 1926, Kylsant announced that he had bought back all the shares in the White Star Line from IMM for £7,907,661. The sale took effect on 1 January 1927, making Kylsant the owner of the largest fleet in the world thanks to his Royal Mail Steam Packet Company (RMSPC). The IMM continued to manage the American White Star agencies.

Despite everything, Kylsant's empire was not to succeed: its vast and aging fleet had to be replaced at a time when the company was experiencing great financial difficulties. This mainly involved repaying Treasury loans that were approaching maturity. Kylsant nevertheless took advantage of his new acquisition to reorganize this fleet: he decided to give White Star the monopoly of the Southampton route within his group, and therefore reassigned two of the ships that the Royal Mail operated on this route, Ohio and Orca, which became Albertic and Calgaric respectively, to the Canadian route alongside Laurentic. As the new chairman of the company, Kylsant was also trying to strengthen the company in its services to Australia. To do this, he bought back the shares of Sir John Ellerman, a minority shareholder of Shaw, Savill & Albion Line, for £994,000 in 1928. This action followed the buyout, for nearly two million pounds, of the Commonwealth Line. These purchases, made by the company White Star Line Ltd created by Kylsant, pushed the company into bankruptcy, even as the group was demanding delays in repaying the Treasury. The decision also turned out to be erroneous; the route to Australia was already suffering from a surplus of tonnage, and the hopes of Kylsant, who said he believed "in the future of Australia," turned out to be in vain. It was also in this context that Kylsant was launching a new construction program at the Harland & Wolff shipyard.

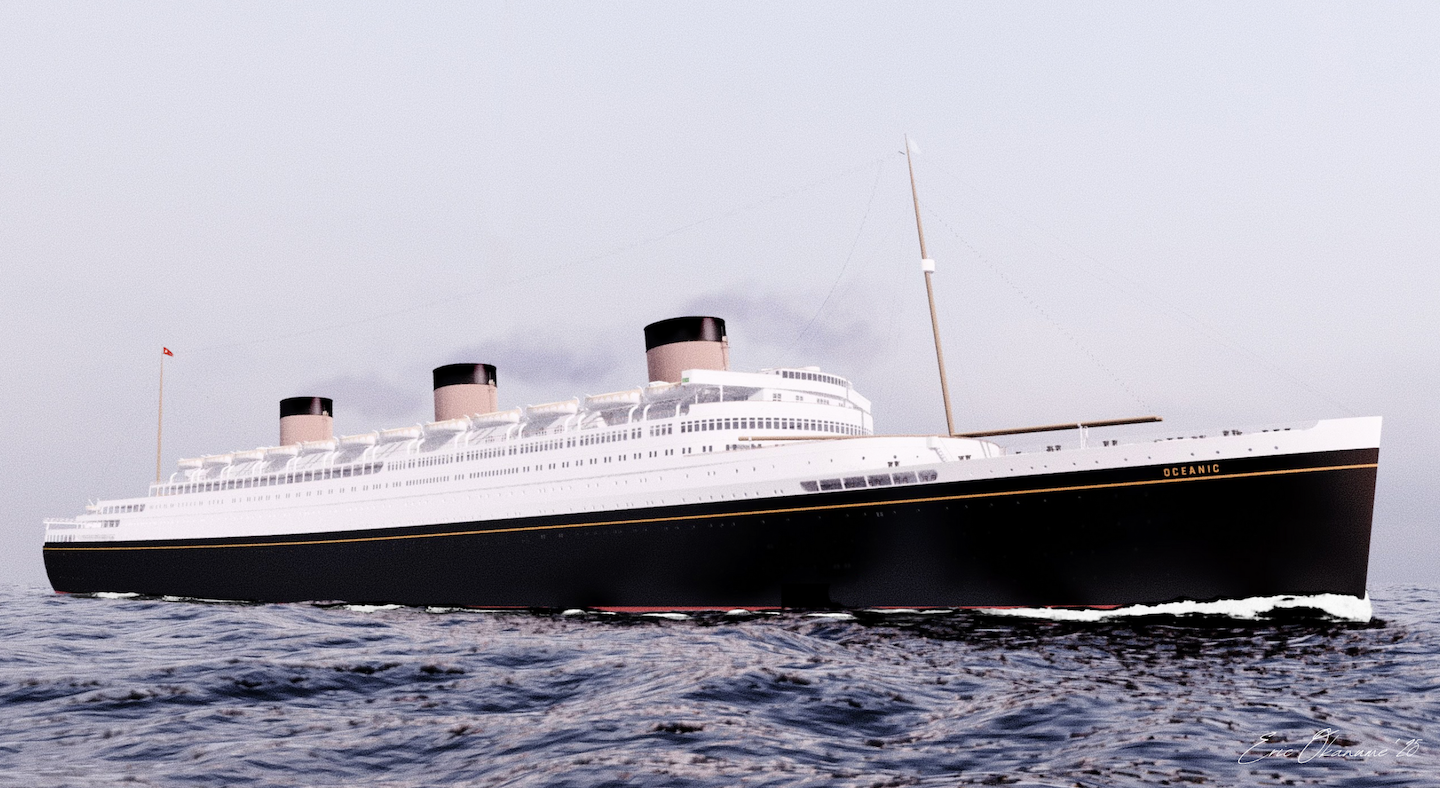
Artist's rendition of Oceanic

In 1928, a new Oceanic was ordered and her keel was laid down that year at Harland and Wolff. The thousand foot long liner was to have been a motor ship propelled by the new diesel-electric propulsion system. However, while the construction of the keel was in progress, work was stopped during 1929, initially to study the new propulsion device. The construction never resumed. Its keel was dismantled and the steel used to construct other ships. The Great Depression of 1929 put an end to the project. Since Lord Kylsant took control of the company, he had been siphoning the revenues of the company for the benefit of the rest of the RMSPC pending an improvement in the financial situation. Also, the dividends declared by the company were constantly decreasing, prompting Harold Sanderson to leave the management. In addition, repeated requests from the Treasury to obtain reimbursement weakened Kylsant, who was eventually arrested in connection with the Royal Mail Case in 1931.

To survive the economic crisis, White Star Line limited its spending. The oldest ships were sold, and many crossings were canceled in order to counter the drop in the number of passengers. Passengers on the transatlantic route numbered 172,000 in 1928, and the number dropped to 157,930 the following year. The liners, including the bigger ones like the Majestic and the Olympic, were used for cruises during this period in order to bring in more income. A new liner, the Britannic entered service in 1930. It adapted perfectly to the circumstances since it was slower and therefore more profitable than the transatlantic ships of the Southampton route. It immediately became the ship making the most money for the company, and a sister ship, the Georgic joined it in 1932.

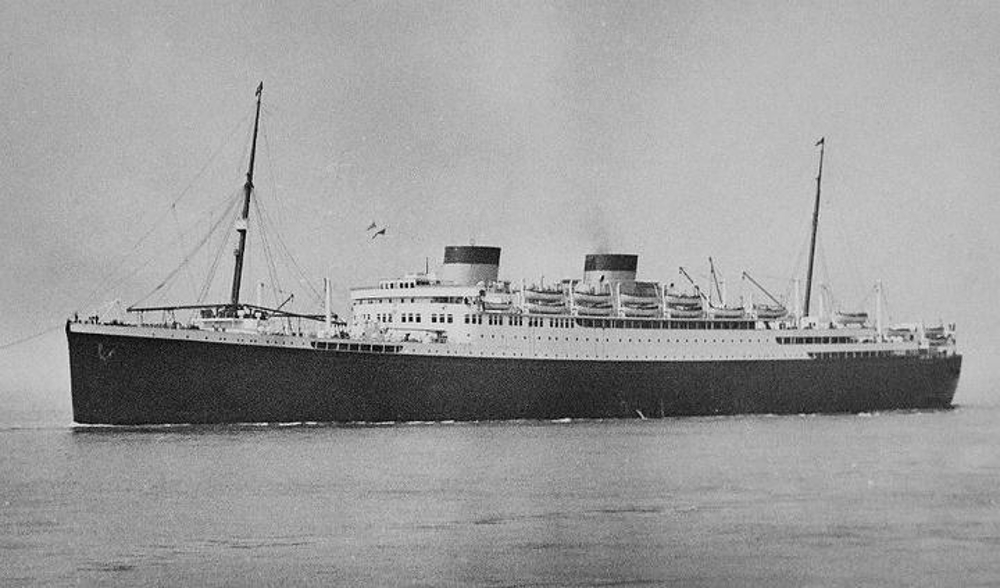
Georgic of 1931 (27,759 GRT)

However, the situation was not favorable for the company, which in 1930, recorded the first deficit in its history, a deficit which continued in the following years. Kylsant's departure in 1931 left his business empire in a state of disrepair. Its liquidation was then envisaged, with the banks then having the role of keeping the various fleets alive as much as possible based on their values. The operation began in 1932, the most complex then being to untangle the web of links uniting the various companies. Another hard blow then struck White Star: the Australian government demanded reimbursement of a million pounds still owed following the purchases of Kylsant. The company was unable to repay its debt, and its ships serving on the Australian route were sold to a new company, the Aberdeen and Commonwealth Line Ltd, in 1933.

In the same year, when the company appeared to be bankrupt, discussions began to take place to consider a merger with the Cunard Line, which was also in financial difficulty. Joseph Bruce Ismay tried, twenty years after his ouster, to participate in the rescue of the company by proposing to create, with the agreement of the government a new company which would operate and would build other ships similar to the Britannic and the Georgic in order to become profitable. The idea did not come to fruition and Ismay died in 1937 without having been able to do more. Meanwhile, other aging ships were being scrapped without being replaced, notably the Big Four with the exception of the Adriatic.

=== Cunard merger ===
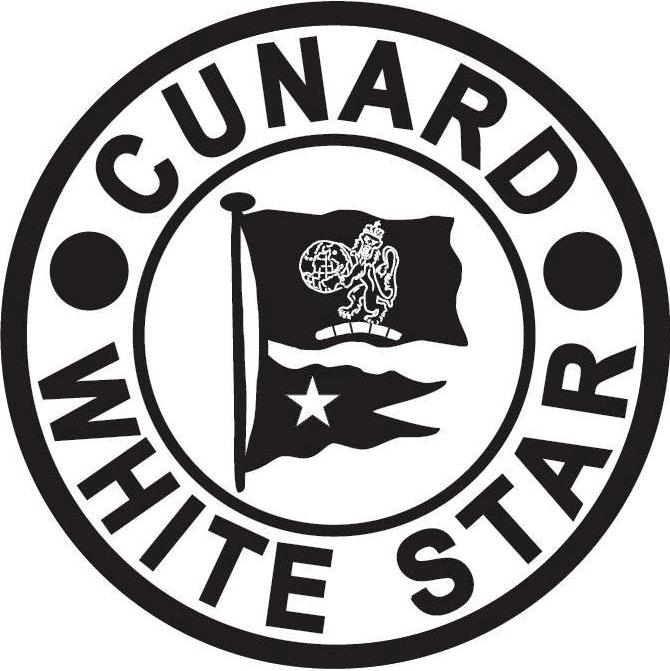
Cunard-White Star Logo

In 1933, White Star and Cunard were both in serious financial difficulties due to the Great Depression, plummeting passenger numbers, and the advanced age of their fleets. Work was halted on Cunard's new giant, Hull 534, later Queen Mary, in 1931 to save money. In 1933, the British government agreed to provide assistance to the two competitors on the condition that they merge their North Atlantic operations. The agreement was completed on 30 December 1933. The merger took place on 10 May 1934, creating Cunard-White Star Limited. White Star contributed ten ships to the new company while Cunard contributed fifteen. Due to this arrangement, and since Hull 534 was Cunard's ship, 62% of the company was owned by Cunard's shareholders and 38% of the company was owned for the benefit of White Star's creditors. White Star's Australia and New Zealand services were not involved in the merger, but were separately disposed of to the Shaw, Savill & Albion Line later in 1934. A year later, Olympic was withdrawn from service and scrapped in 1937.

In 1947, Cunard acquired the remaining 38% of Cunard White Star. On 31 December 1949, they acquired Cunard-White Star's assets and operations, and reverted to using the name "Cunard" on 1 January 1950. From the time of the 1934 merger, the house flags of both lines had been flown on all their ships, with each ship flying the flag of its original owner above the other, but from 1950, even Georgic and Britannic, the last surviving White Star liners, flew the Cunard house flag above the White Star burgee until they were each withdrawn from service in 1956 and 1961 respectively. Just as the retiring of Cunard's Aquitania in 1950 marked the end of the pre-World War I 'floating palaces', the retirement of Britannic a decade later marked the end of White Star Line. All Cunard vessels flew both the Cunard and White Star Line house flags on their masts until late 1968. This was most likely because Nomadic remained in service with Cunard until 4 November 1968, and was sent to the breakers' yard, only to be bought for use as a floating restaurant. After this, the White Star flag was no longer flown, the White Star name was removed from Cunard operations and all remnants of both White Star Line and Cunard-White Star Line were retired.

== The Australia Run ==
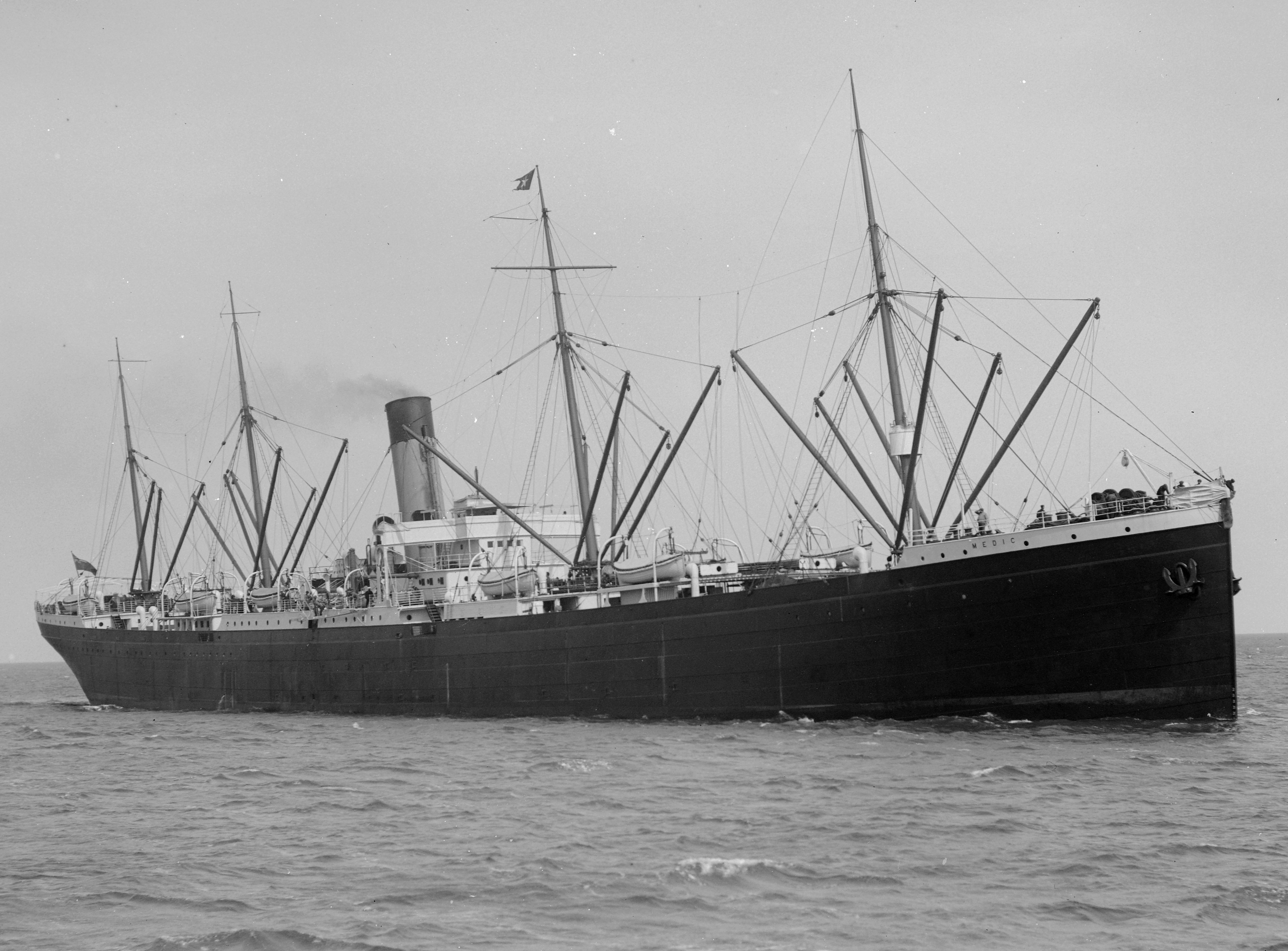
Medic of 1898 (11,948 GRT), the second of the original trio of the Jubilee class and the ship which inaugurated White Star's new Australian service.

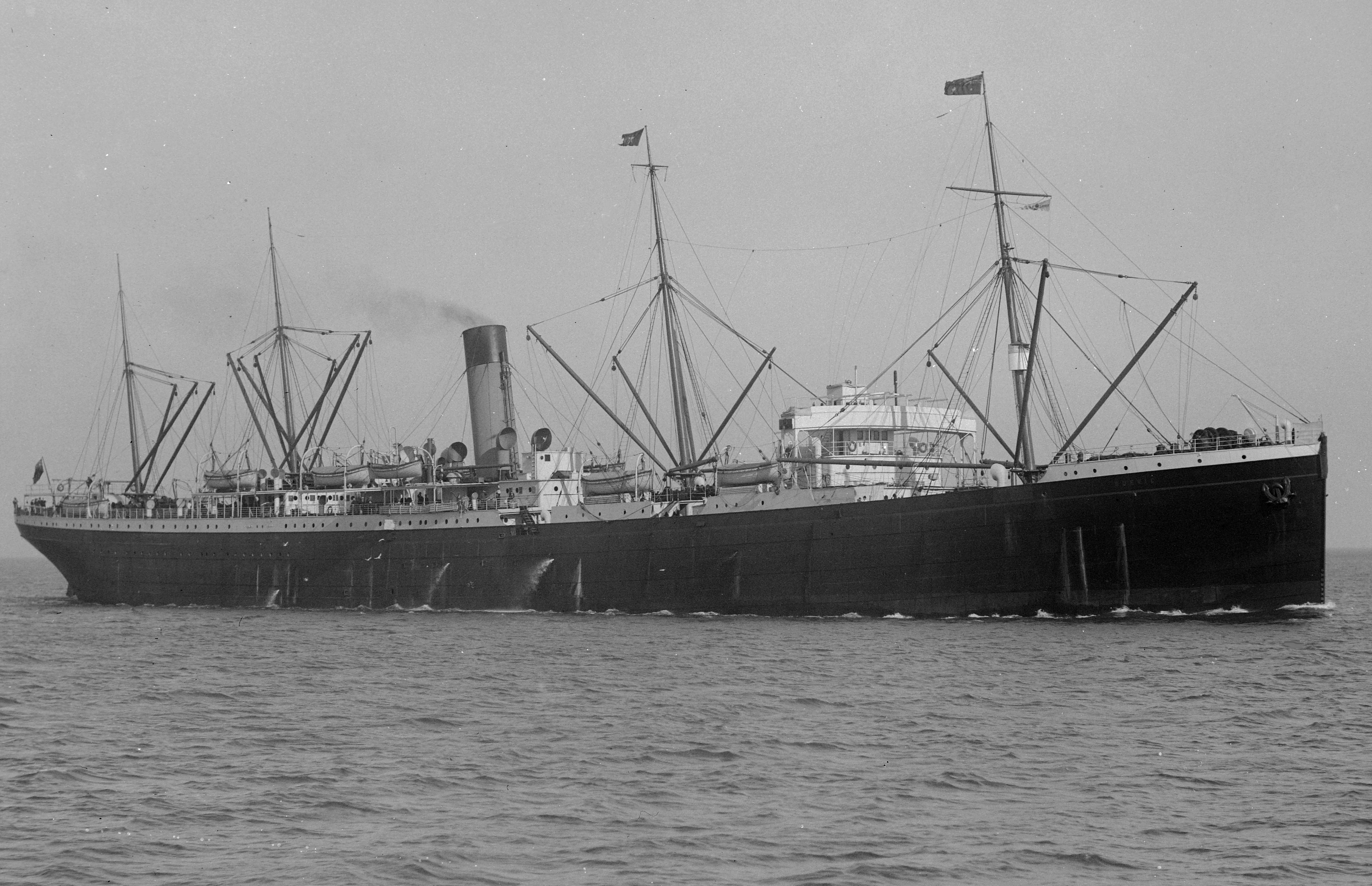
Suevic, launched in 1900 (12,531 GRT), was the last of the class and one of the modified ships with greater passenger capacity

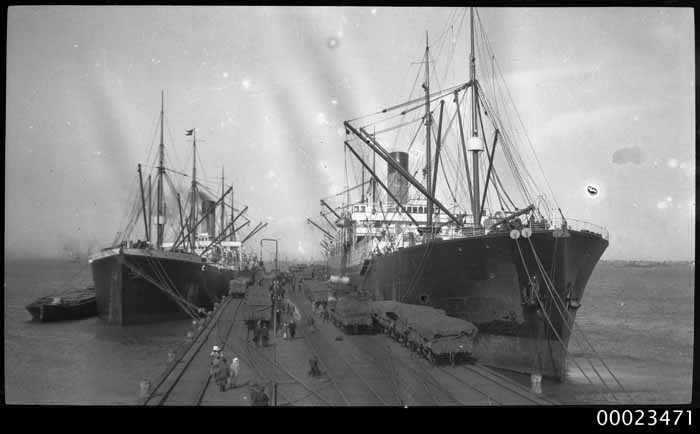
Persic (left) and Ceramic (right) loading at Sydney in the 1920s

White Star had begun as a line serving traffic to and from Australia, especially during the gold rushes of the 1850s, but following the line's collapse and its purchase by Thomas Ismay in 1868, the company was rebuilt as a trans-Atlantic line. However, in the late 1890s White Star decided to reinstate a service to Australia, partly because of the discovery of further gold deposits in Western Australia leading to another series of gold rushes and an increase in emigrants to Australia, as well as an increasing trade in minerals, agricultural produce, wool and meat in the other direction. The latter had become a major source of revenue for shipping lines already on the route after the advent of effective mechanical refrigeration systems in the late 1880s, allowing large quantities of cattle carcasses to be preserved on the long voyage back to the British Isles.

Thomas Ismay decided to re-enter the Australian run in 1897 with a monthly service between Liverpool, Cape Town and Sydney. A stop at Tenerife was included in the schedule both outbound and inbound. Outbound ships would call at Adelaide and Melbourne and the return trip would call at Plymouth before ending at Liverpool. With the journey taking six weeks, five ships would be needed to maintain the service in both directions. The specification for the new ships was drawn up and the order placed with Harland & Wolff in the summer of 1897, coinciding with the Diamond Jubilee of Queen Victoria, thus they became known as the Jubilee class. In keeping with White Star's new philosophy on the Atlantic of size over speed, the Jubilee class were to be the largest ships ever put on the Australia run, at 550 ft (170 m) in length and nearly 12,000 gross register tons. They were single-funnel, twin-screw ships designed as mixed cargo/passenger vessels, essentially being enlarged versions of White Star's earlier Naronic class. With a service speed of 14 knots (26 km/h; 16 mph), the Jubilee class were significantly slower than the smaller mailships run by the Orient Line and P&O and their size meant they could not transit the Suez Canal, so they would have to take the long route via South Africa and would not attract first-class passengers. Instead they were intended for the emigrant/seasonal worker traffic, carrying 320 passengers solely in what was described as third-class accommodation. However, following White Star's long tradition of improving standards for third-class passengers, these facilities were considerably ahead of the equivalent on other lines, being broadly in line with second-class facilities on other ships. Although all of the same class, prices for berths on the Jubilee class varied, allowing passengers the choice of two- or four-berth cabins for a premium or open dormitories. Passengers had use of facilities such as a large dining room, a library and a smoking room, as well as free run of nearly all the ship's deck space during the voyage. The ships could carry 15,000 tons of cargo in seven holds, including capacity for 100,000 meat carcasses.

The first Jubilee-class ship, Afric, was launched in November 1898, but her maiden voyage in February 1899 was to New York as a shakedown cruise and to test the new ship on a shorter route – small improvements were made to Afric and her sister ships as a result of this trip. The Australian service was actually inaugurated by the second ship, Medic, which left Liverpool in August 1899 and arrived in Sydney in October. The third ship, Persic, began her maiden voyage in December 1899 but was delayed for several weeks in Cape Town after her rudder broke due to faulty metalwork. The final pair of ships for the Australia run were built to a modified design following the experiences with the original trio. The Australian run proved to be more popular with passengers than expected, so these two ships, Runic and Suevic, had their bridges moved forward and their poop decks extended. As well as slightly increasing their gross register tonnage, this gave them capacity for a further 50 passengers, bringing the total to 400. Suevic made her maiden voyage in May 1901, bringing White Star's new Australian service to full strength. By now the return voyage also included a stop at London – most passengers from Australia disembarked at Plymouth to go to their final destination by rail, while much of the cargo was bound for London. The ship would then steam back through the English Channel to offload the last of her cargo and passengers at Liverpool before preparing for the next voyage. The Australian run was successful and profitable for White Star, and largely uneventful for the ships. In the earliest days of the route the initial three ships were heavily used to transport men, soldiers and supplies to South Africa during the Boer War, while Suevic ran aground off Lizard Point, Cornwall in 1907. There were no casualties and, despite the ship being broken in two as part of an ambitious salvage operation, she was repaired and re-entered service in January 1908. The success of the new Australian service in terms of freight led to White Star transferring an older cargo-only ship of a similar size to the Jubilee class, Cevic, from the New York service to the Australia Run. In 1910 Cevic was used to experiment with routing ships to Australia via the Suez Canal but she ran aground several times in the canal and the ships continued to operate via the Cape. Cevic was used on the Australia run on a seasonal basis, mainly carrying cattle and wool at the end of the Australian autumn (February–April) and then being switched to the New York run during the Atlantic summer.

Continued demand for extra passenger capacity led to White Star building a one-off ship for the route. Launched in 1913, Ceramic was a larger, more sophisticated development of the Jubilee class, at 655 ft (200 m) in length and 18,495 gross register tons. Like Laurentic and the Olympic class, Ceramic was a triple-screw ship with the central propeller driven by a low-pressure turbine using exhaust from the two reciprocating steam engines. This enabled her to be slightly faster – 16 knots (30 km/h; 18 mph) – than the Jubilee-class vessels despite her extra size for a minimal increase in coal consumption. The new ship had a significantly larger superstructure and nearly double the passenger capacity of the Jubilee-class ships – a total of 600 passengers, still carried only in what was advertised as third-class accommodation. She could also carry 19,000 tons of cargo in eight holds, including 321,000 cu ft (9,100 m^{3}) of refrigerated space. The dimensions of Ceramic were restricted by the length of the quay at London's Port of Tilbury and the clearance for the masts under the then-proposed Sydney Harbour Bridge. When she arrived in Sydney in September 1914, she took the place of the Jubilee-class ships as the largest vessel on the Australia run from Britain. After the long-delayed construction of the Harbour Bridge in 1932, Ceramic would be the tallest ship then in service to pass under it.

All seven ships were requisitioned as troop transports during World War I, forcing White Star to suspend the regular Australia service. Afric was torpedoed by a U-boat in the English Channel in 1917 and Cevic remained in the ownership of the Royal Fleet Auxiliary after the war, but the remaining five ships were returned to White Star and the service was resumed in 1919. The remaining Jubilee-class liners were withdrawn from service in the late 1920s. Persic was scrapped in 1926 while Medic and Suevic were sold in 1928 and Runic in 1929. All were converted into whaling factory ships on account of their size and cargo capacity. The Australia run was no longer as lucrative or as heavily trafficked as it had been before the war and the route was no longer a priority for White Star, especially once it came under the ownership of the Royal Mail Steam Packet Company in 1927. A new ship, intended to be the first of a new class to replace the Jubilee class, had been launched in 1917 – Vedic. This was the first White Star ship to be powered solely by turbines and had the same emigrant/cargo-carrying role as her predecessors, although at 460 ft (140 m) and 9,332 gross register tons, she was smaller than the older ships. Vedic went straight from the builders to service as a troopship and was initially used on White Star's Canadian service until she was put on the Australia run in 1925. Ceramic and Vedic maintained a less-intensive Australian service until White Star merged with the Cunard Line in 1934. The new management immediately decided to end White Star's routes to the southern hemisphere – Ceramic was sold to the Shaw, Savill & Albion Line, which continued to operate her on the same route, while Vedic was scrapped.

== The New Zealand Service ==
In 1883 an agreement was made between White Star and the Shaw, Savill & Albion Line (newly formed by merger the previous year) to operate a joint service between London and Wellington. Thomas Ismay had already been considering setting up a New Zealand route for White Star, but with Shaw, Savill & Albion (SS&A) already formed due to the difficulties of competing against the New Zealand Shipping Company (NZSC), sharing the venture with a firm that was already established on the route but looking to expand was an attractive proposition. Two ships were already in-build by the time the agreement was signed – the Ionic (1883) and the Doric. In fact both these ships were chartered to the would-be rival NZSC immediately after their launch, as well as the older Coptic to make up for the very shortfall in ships on the run that White Star was hoping to exploit.

The White Star/Shaw Savill New Zealand service did not begin in earnest until the next year. The three ships were timetabled in addition to the existing Shaw Savill service and were managed and administered by Shaw Savill's agents, but White Star provided the crews and the ships retained their White Star names, livery and house flag. The route was an eastward circumnavigation, calling at Tenerife, Cape Town and Dar es Salaam on the way to Wellington, then rounding Cape Horn and calling at Montevideo and Rio de Janeiro on the return.

Traffic on the New Zealand route did not develop as quickly as anticipated, and in 1893 a new dedicated combined cargo/passenger liner, Gothic, with nearly twice the gross tonnage of one of the older ships, was introduced. Coptic and Doric were chartered to White Star's long-time partner in the Pacific, the Occidental and Oriental Steamship Company.

By the next decade, traffic on the New Zealand service had picked up and was becoming both profitable and over-subscribed. When White Star became part of the International Mercantile Marine Company in 1902, an agreement was made with Shaw, Savill & Albion that White Star would construct and provide three ships for the joint New Zealand service which, as before, would be managed and administered by SS&A. A trio of new 12,300 GRT liners, the Athenic class were ordered from Harland & Wolff. Although slightly smaller in length and tonnage, they closely resembled the two modified Jubilee-class liners built for the Australia Run, with bridges mounted far forward to allow for a generous passenger-carrying space. Unlike the Jubilees, the Athenic class carried passengers in all three classes. Athenic and Corinthic entered service in 1902 and Ionic (1902) (re-using the name of one of the ships that began the service 20 years before) in 1903.

All three ships became troop carriers under the auspices of the Minister of Shipping during the First World War, carrying the New Zealand Expeditionary Force to Europe and the Middle East. After the war they returned to the joint service with White Star/Shaw Savill, but the route was no longer in such demand or so profitable, and White Star was becoming more focused on its core Atlantic service between Southampton and New York and increasingly looking to wind down the Australia Run, the Atlantic services to Boston and Canada and the New Zealand service. In 1928 Athenic was sold to a Norwegian firm and converted into a whaling factory ship. In 1929 Corinthic was re-fitted to have single third/tourist class accommodation only, and she was sold for scrap in 1931. Only Ionic was still in service when White Star and Cunard merged in 1934, at which point Ionic on the New Zealand run was sold on to Shaw, Savill & Albion along with Ceramic on the Australian service. The elderly liner was scrapped in 1936.

== Legacy ==
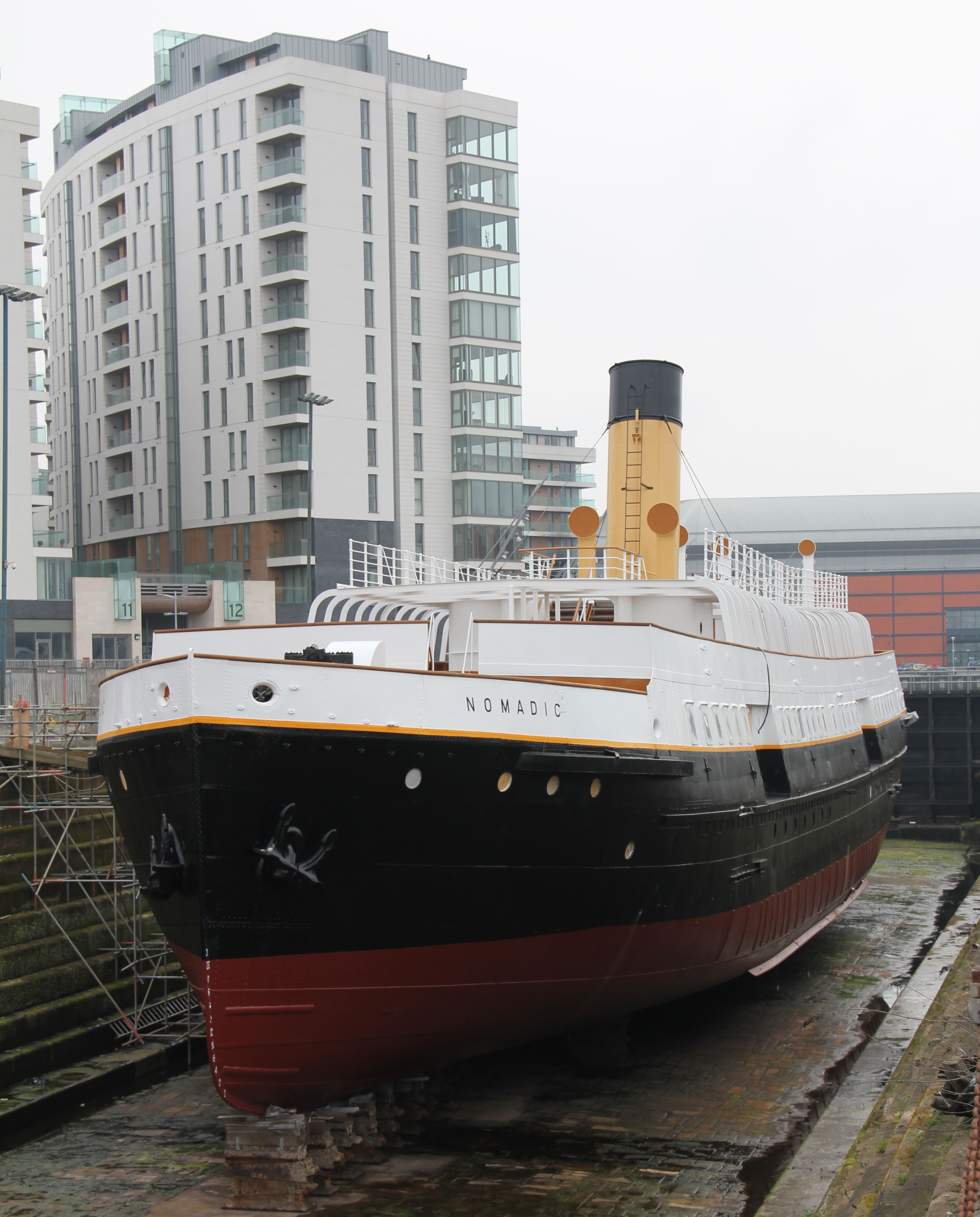
Last surviving White Star ship, Nomadic, photographed in 2012 in the condition in which she would have appeared in 1912, drydocked in Belfast, Northern Ireland

The White Star Line's main offices, Albion House, still exist in Liverpool, standing in James Street within sight of the more grandiose headquarters of their rivals, the Cunard Building. The building has a plaque commemorating the fact that it was once the head office of the White Star Line. It was the first open plan office building in Liverpool. J. Bruce Ismay had his office in the building.

The White Star Line's London office building, Oceanic House, still exists today, and has been converted into apartments. They are on Cockspur Street, off Trafalgar Square, and the company name can still be seen on the building over the entrances. The Southampton offices in Canute Road still exist, now known as Canute Chambers.

The French passenger tender Nomadic, the last surviving vessel of the White Star Line, was purchased by the Northern Ireland Department for Social Development in January 2006. She has since been returned to Belfast, where she has been fully restored to her original and elegant 1912 appearance under the auspices of the Nomadic Preservation Society with the assistance of her original builders, Harland and Wolff. She is currently serving as an outside exhibit of the Titanic Belfast museum, a museum dedicated to the history of Atlantic steam, the White Star Line, and its most famous ship, Titanic. The historic Nomadic was opened ceremoniously to the public on 31 May 2013.

In 1995, Cunard Line introduced White Star Service to Queen Elizabeth 2 as a reference to the high standards of customer service expected of the company. The term is still used today onboard Queen Mary 2, Queen Victoria, Queen Elizabeth, and Queen Anne. The company has also created the White Star Academy, an in-house programme for preparing new crew members for the service standards expected on Cunard ships.

The White Star flag is raised on all Cunard ships and Nomadic every 15 April in memory of the Titanic disaster.

== See also ==
- List of White Star Line ships

== Bibliography ==
- Anderson, Roy Claude (1964). White Star. Prescot: T. Stephenson & Sons Ltd. OCLC 3134809.
- Chirnside, Mark (2004). The Olympic-class ships: Olympic, Titanic, Britannic. Tempus. ISBN 0-7524-2868-3.
- de Kerbrech, Richard P. (2009). Ships of the White Star Line. Hersham: Ian Allan Publishing. ISBN 978-0-7110-3366-5. OCLC 298597975.
- Eaton, John P.; Haas, Charles A. (1989). Falling Star: Misadventures of White Star Line Ships. Wellingborough: Patrick Stephens Ltd. ISBN 1-85260-084-5. OCLC 20935102.
- Ferruli, Corrado (2004). Au cœur des Bateaux de légende (in French). Hachette Collection. ISBN 978-2-84634-350-3.
- Haws, Duncan (1990). White Star Line. Merchant Fleets. Vol. 17. Hereford: TCL Publications. ISBN 0-946378-16-9. OCLC 50214776.
- Le Goff, Olivier (1998). Les Plus Beaux Paquebots du Monde (in French). Paris: Solar. ISBN 2-263-02799-8.
- Masson, Philippe (1998). Le Drame du Titanic (in French). Paris: Tallendier. ISBN 2-235-02176-X.
