= SS Cevic =

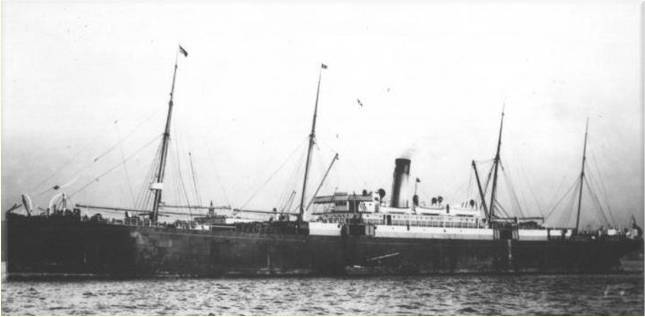

History

United Kingdom
- Name: Cevic (1894 – 1915); Bayol (1915 – 1917); Bayleaf (1917 – 1920); Pyrula (1920 – 1933)
- Owner: White Star Line; Royal Navy; Royal Fleet Auxiliary; Anglo-Saxon Petroleum Company
- Port of registry: (United Kingdom) Liverpool; United Kingdom; United Kingdom; United Kingdom
- Builder: Harland & Wolff
- Yard number: 270
- Launched: 23 September 1893
- Completed: 6 January 1894
- Maiden voyage: 12 January 1894
- Out of service: 25 July 1933
- Identification: Official number: 102126
- Fate: Sold for scrap 1933

General characteristics
- Type: Livestock Carrier
- Tonnage: 8,301 GRT
- Length: 523 ft 0 in (159.41 m)
- Beam: 60 ft 0 in (18.29 m)
- Decks: 2
- Installed power: 2 Triple expansion steam engines of 3700 indicated horsepower
- Propulsion: Twin propeller
- Speed: 13 knots (24 km/h; 15 mph)
- Capacity: 1,000 cattle

The SS Cevic was a steamship built by Harland & Wolff for the White Star Line for service initially in the North Atlantic. Later she was transferred to the Australia run. On the outbreak of the First World War she was sold to the Admiralty and converted to a dummy capital ship. Later she was transferred to the Royal Fleet Auxiliary. After the war she was sold to the Anglo-Saxon Petroleum Company.

== History ==
=== White Star service ===
Cevic was launched at the Harland and Wolff yard, Belfast, on 23 September 1893 and was completed on 6 January 1894. She was one of the largest cargo ships in the world in her day and, in addition to her normal cargo holds, was equipped to carry up to 1000 head of cattle.

On 16 October 1902 Cevic was struck by a steam dredger while berthed in New York City.

By 1908 the widespread adoption of refrigeration had led to the end of the livestock trade. Cevic was transferred to the United Kingdom-Australia service travelling via the Cape route in view of her deep draught. In 1910 the decision was taken to try routing her via the Suez Canal to save time. However she grounded several times in the canal and had to return to Port Said for repairs after taking on water. After this mishap she reverted to the longer route round the Cape. She was occasionally used on the North Atlantic during this period as she made two ice reports on 20 April 1912, shortly after the sinking of RMS Titanic.

=== First World War ===
After the outbreak of war Cevic was sold to the Admiralty in October 1914 to be converted to a dummy capital ship by Harland and Wollf at Belfast. Fitted with two extra dummy funnels and wooden turrets she masqueraded as the battlecruiser HMS Queen Mary.

After conversion Cevic left Belfast on 11 February 1915 only to be holed on a rock on the 13th en route to Loch Ewe. As a result, she had to put back into Belfast for repairs. On 10 April 1915 she left again only to run aground in fog on Rathlin Island. However she floated off on the next tide and continued on to Loch Ewe. Subsequently, while on patrol off the east coast of the United States, she was spotted by the German raider SS Kronprinz Wilhelm which put into New York on 25 April 1915 and applied for internment as she had failed to rendezvous with her supply ship and was running low on stores.

In September 1915 Cevic was transferred to the Royal Fleet Auxiliary, renamed Bayol and fitted with oil tanks to serve as a fleet oiler. In 1917 she was transferred to the Shipping Controller and renamed Bayleaf.

=== Post-war ===
In 1920 she was sold to the Anglo-Saxon Petroleum Company who renamed her Pyrula. She served as a depot ship at New York until 1925 when she was transferred to Curaçao for the same purpose.

Pyrula was sold for scrap to Henrico Haupt of Genoa in 1933.
