= List of White Star Line ships =

The following is a list of ships operated by the White Star Line.

== 1846–1869 ==
Ship	Built	White Star service	GRT	Notes	Image
Elizabeth	1842	1846–18??	1600	Brig, Liverpool -> Montreal	
David Cannon	1847	1852–1854	1331	Wrecked Jun 1854 at Halifax	
Iowa	1849	1849–1853	879	Sold 1853, missing 1854 en route from Juicy to Australia	
Bhurtpoor	1851	1851–1853	978	Wrecked 18 September 1853 Wexford	
Tantivy	1851	1852–1868	1040		
Jessie Munn	1852	1852–1863	875	Sold 1863, abandoned 1868	
Fitzjames	1852	1852–1868	1195	Broken up between 1895 and 1905	
Defence	18??	1853–18??	?		
Tayleur	1853	1854	4,000	Launched in 1853 by William Rennie of Liverpool. Ran aground and sank off Lambay Island on maiden voyage in 1854 with a heavy loss of life.	
Arabian	1852	1854–1866	1068	Scrapped in 1866.	
Red Jacket	1853	1854–1878	2305	Launched in 1853 by George Thomas of Rockland. Bought by Pilkington & Wilson for trans-Australian routes in 1866. In 1859, collided and sank the British Elizabeth Walker hulk. Ran aground on Cantick Head Orkneys sailing from Calcutta to Liverpool, refloated and repaired. Sold to Portuguese Blandy Brothers in 1883 for coal hauling. Wrecked in 1885 and sold for scrap.	
Emma	1853	1854–1858	1049		
Golden Era	1853	1854–1858	1557	Lost 22 June 1858	
Mermaid	1853	1854–1862	1321	Wrecked in 1883	
White Star	1854	1855–1866	2340	Sold 1866; Wrecked off the Irish coast in 1883	
Shepherdess	1855	1855–1860	1126	Sank 15 September 1860	
King of Algeria	1856	1856–18??	1707		
Royal Saxon	1857	1857–18??	1109		
Annie Wilson	1854	1857–18??	1191	Abandoned 1867	
Prince of the Seas	1853	1858–1861	1326	Burnt Nov 1861 at Anchorage	
Blue Jacket	1854	1858–1863	986	Wrecked 1863 at Saugor Island	
Carntyne	1852	1859–1863	940	Lost 1863	
Shalimar	1854	1860–18??	1402	Sold 1869	
Electric	1857	1860–18??	1106	Condemned 1864	
Ocean Home	1858	1860–18??	596	Sold 1863	
Blue Jacket	1858	1860–1869	1790	Launched by Robert E. Jackson of East Boston for Seccomb & Taylor, in 1854, then sold to John Frost's Fox Line of Australian Packets in 1855. Chartered by White Star from 1854 to 1866. Destroyed by fire on 9 March 1869 near Falklands.	
Lord Raglan	1854	1860–18??	1904	Missing 26 February 1863 Liverpool -> Melbourne	
Chariot of Fame	1853	1861–18??	2050	Abandoned Jan 1876	
Queen of the North	1860	1862–1868	1668	Taken over 1868	
Silistria	1854	1862–??	1182	Liverpool to Victoria BC route	
Glendevon	1862	1862–1870	954	Sold 1870	
Donna Maria (ex-Beaconsfield)	1862	1862–18??	810	Lost 24 November 1877	
Cecilia	1863	1863–1866	612	Sold 1866	
Albert William	1863	1863–18??	505	Wrecked Sep 1900	
Royal Standard	1863	1863–1867	1182	First steamship of the company. Hit an iceberg on 24 April 1864. In 1868 her engine was removed entirely converting her to sail power. Sold 1867 and was wrecked on Brazilian coast near Cape St. Tome in 1869.	
Santon	1863	1863–1866	511	Sold 1866	
Ulcoats	1863	1863–1874	671	Missing 1874	
Tornado	1852	1863–1867	1720	Sold 1867	
Golden Sunset	1863	1864–18??	628	Wrecked 17 December 1866	
Sam Cearns	1864	1864–1867	1422	Sold Jan 1867	
W. H. Haselden	1864	1864–1866	897	Sold 1866	
Sirius	1865	1865–1866	491	Steamship. Sold foreign 1866	

== 1870–1889 ==
Ship	Built	White Star service	GRT	Notes	Image
Oceanic	1870	1870–1895	3,707	Launched in 1870 by Harland and Wolff for White Star trans-Atlantic routes. Chartered by O&O Lines in 1875. Scrapped at Thames in 1895. The first steamship for the White Star Line, and often referred to as the Mother of Modern Liners.	
Atlantic	1871	1871–1873	3,707	Launched in 1870 by Harland and Wolff for White Star trans-Atlantic routes. Ran aground off Nova Scotia on 1 April 1873 with the loss of 535 lives.	
Baltic	1871	1871–1889	3,888	Launched in 1870 by Harland and Wolff originally as Pacific for White Star trans-Atlantic routes. Chartered to Inman Line 1883–1885. Sold to the Holland America Line in 1889 and renamed Veendam. Sank off Wales in 1898 when collided with a wreck and without any loss of life.	
Tropic	1871	1871–1873	2,122	Launched in 1871 by Harland and Wolff for White Star trans-India routes. Sold to Spanish Serra y Font Line under Federico in 1873, then sold again to a Spanish company in 1886, then scrapped in 1894. Sold in 1873	
Asiatic	1871	1871–1873	2,122	Launched in 1870 by Harland and Wolff for White Star trans-Atlantic routes. Sold to African Steamship Company in 1873 under SS Ambriz. Ran aground off Madagascar in 1903.	
Republic	1872	1872–1889	3,708	Launched in 1871 by Harland and Wolff for White Star trans-Atlantic routes. Sold to Holland America Line in 1889 under Maasdamin, sold to Italian company La Veloce under Vittoria in 1902, then under Città di Napoli for trans-Italian routes. Scrapped at Genoa in 1910.	
Adriatic	1872	1872–1899	3,888	Launched in 1871 by Harland and Wolff for White Star trans-Atlantic routes. Collided with the Cunard Line's Parthia in 1874. Rammed and sank the British schooner Columbus in Crosby Channel Liverpool and rammed and sank Harvest Queen in St. George's Channel in 1875. Rammed Hengist off Holyhead and rammed and sank brig G. A. Pike off Wales in 1878. Scrapped at Preston in 1899.	
Celtic	1872	1872–1893	3,867	Launched in 1872 by Harland and Wolff originally as Arctic for White Star trans-Atlantic routes, collided with White Star's SS Britannic off Sandy Hook in 1887. Sold to the Danish Thingvalla Line in 1893 under Amerika. Scrapped in 1898.	
Traffic	1872	1872–1896	155	Launched in 1872 by Philip Speakman, Runcorn for White Star serving as cargo transport, ran into Maggie Ann at Liverpool in 1878. Converted as a dumb barge in 1919. Sunk in May Blitz in 1941, raised and resailed. Scrapped in 1955.	
Belgic	1873	1873–1888	2,652	Launched in 1873 by Harland and Wolff for White Star trans-Atlantic routes, chartered by O&O Line in 1875. Sold to Spanish Cia de Nav. La Flecha in 1883 under Goefredo. Ran aground in Santiago de Cuba and repaired in Liverpool, when leaving, ran aground again in 1884.	
Gaelic	1873	1873–1896	2,685	Launched in 1872 by Harland and Wolff for White Star trans-Atlantic routes, chartered to O&O Line in 1875 for trans-Pacific routes. Sold to Spanish Cia. de Navigacion la Flecha under Hugo. Ran aground at Terschelling and scrapped at Amsterdam in 1896.	
Britannic	1874	1874–1903	5,004	Launched in 1874 by Harland and Wolff for White Star trans-Atlantic routes, collided with the Czarowitz in 1890 in the Crosby Channel, and served as troop carrier in Boer War. Scrapped at Hamburg in 1903.	
Germanic	1875	1875–1903	5,008	Launched in 1874 by Harland and Wolff for White Star trans-Atlantic routes, collided with Samarang off Sandy Hook in 1880, collided with Cumbrae in River Mersey in 1895. Transferred to American Line in 1903, then to Dominion Line in 1905 under Ottawa. Sold to Administration de Navigation à Vapeur Ottomane in 1910 then to Gul Djemal, then to Türkiye Seyr-i Sefain İdaresi in 1928 under Gülcemal. Scrapped at Messina in 1950.	
Arabic	1881	1881–1890	4,368	Launched in 1881 by Harland and Wolff for White Star originally as Asiatic, served trans-Atlantic routes. Chartered by O&O Line for trans-Pacific and Australian shipping. Sold to Holland America Line in 1890 under SS Spaarndam. Scrapped in 1901 at Preston.	
Coptic	1881	1881–1908	4,448	Launched in 1881 by Harland and Wolff for White Star serving trans-Pacific routes, chartered by O&O Line, SS&A Line in 1884. Sold to Pacific Mail Steamship Company in 1906 under Persia, and to Japanese Oriental Steam Ship Co. in 1915 under Persia Maru. Scrapped at Osaka in 1926.	
Doric	1883	1883–1906	4,784	Launched in 1883 by Harland and Wolff for White Star serving New Zealand routes jointly with Shaw, Savill & Albion Line and chartered by O&O Line. Sold to Pacific Mail Steamship Company in 1906 under Asia. Ran aground off Taichow Islands in 1911.	
Ionic	1883	1883–1900	4,753	Launched in 1883 by Harland and Wolff serving New Zealand routes jointly with Shaw, Savill & Albion Line. Sold to Aberdeen Line in 1900 under SS Sophocles, chartered by New Zealand Shipping Company (1883–1884) and chartered by Spanish government (1900). Scrapped in 1908.	
Belgic	1885	1885–1903	4,212	Launched in 1883 by Harland and Wolff serving White Star trans-Pacific routes. Sold to Atlantic Transport Line in 1889 under Mohawk serving trans-Atlantic routes. Served as transport in Boer War, was scrapped in 1903.	
Gaelic	1885	1885–1905	4,206	Launched in 1885 by Harland & Wolff, serves White Star under Occidental and Oriental Steamship Co. charter, sold to Pacific SN Co., serves until 1907 under Callao, scrapped at Briton Ferry.	
Cufic	1888	1888–1901	4,639	Launched by Harland and Wolff serving White Star trans-Atlantic routes. Chartered to Spanish shipping line under Nuestra Señora de Guadalupe in 1896. Returned to White Star in 1898 then transferred to Dominion Line under Manxman in 1901. Sold to Canadian shipping Line, then serves as troop carrier in WWI, then sold to New York-based owners in 1919. Sank in North Atlantic in 1919 en route to Gibraltar.	
Runic	1889	1889–1895	5,043	Launched by Harland and Wolff in 1889 under Runic, serving trans-Atlantic routes. Sold to West Indies and Pacific Steamship Line in 1895 under Tampican. Sold to Norwegian HE Moss then to Southern Pacific Whaling Company in 1912 repurposed as a whaler under SS Imo. Chartered by Belgian Relief Commission for relief in WWI. Was present at the Halifax explosion. Wrecked on 30 November 1921 on the Falklands.	
Teutonic	1889	1889–1921	9,984	Launched by Harland and Wolff in 1889, serving trans-Atlantic routes. Collided with United States Lines Berlin and served as troop carrier in Boer War. It was the first armed merchant cruiser and last White Star liner to hold the Blue Riband. Scrapped at Emden in 1921.	

== 1890–1899 ==
Ship	Built	White Star service	GRT	Notes	Image
Majestic	1890	1890–1914	9,965	Launched in 1889 by Harland and Wolff for White Star serving trans-Atlantic routes. Scrapped in 1914 at Morecambe by Thos. W. Ward	
Nomadic	1891	1891–1903	5,749	Launched in 1891 by Harland and Wolff for White Star serving as troop carrier in Boer War, and transferred to Dominion Line under Cornishman in 1904, then to Leyland Line in 1921. Scrapped in 1926.	
Tauric	1891	1891–1929	5,728	Launched in 1891 by Harland and Wolff for White Star serving trans-Atlantic routes. Transferred to Dominion Line in 1903 under Welshman and then to Leyland Line in 1921. Scrapped in 1929.	
Magnetic	1891	1891–1932	619	Launched in 1891 by Harland and Wolff for White Star serving trans-Atlantic routes. Collided with schooner Kate in the Crosby Channel in 1915; Sold to Alexandra Towing Company in 1932 under SS Ryde and scrapped at Glasgow in 1935.	
Ireland	1891	1891–1928	245	Built in 1891 by JP Rennoldson & Sons, South Shields for tender service at Queenstown, Ireland. Scrapped in 1928.	
America	1891	1891–1945	244	Built in 1891 by JP Rennoldson & Sons, South Shields for tender service at Queenstown, Ireland. Scrapped in 1945.	
Naronic	1892	1892–1893	6,594	Launched in 1892 by Harland and Wolff for White Star serving trans-Atlantic routes. Vanished at sea sometime after 11 February 1893. Sister ship of SS Bovic	
Bovic	1892	1892–1922	6,583	Launched in 1892 by Harland and Wolff for White Star serving trans-Atlantic routes. Sold to Leyland Line in 1922 under Colonian and scrapped at Rotterdam in 1928.	
Gothic	1893	1893–1906	7,755	Launched in 1893 by Harland and Wolff for White Star serving trans-Atlantic routes, transferred to Red Star Line twice under Gothland (1907–1911, 1913–1925), when run aground, scrapped in 1925.	
Cevic	1894	1894–1914	8,301	Launched in 1893 by Harland and Wolff for White Star, serving trans-Atlantic and Australian routes. Sold to Admiralty in 1914 to be repurposed as a dummy ship for HMS Queen Mary, transferred to Royal Fleet Auxiliary, under Bayol as an oiler in 1915, transferred to the shipping controller under Bayleaf in 1917. Sold to Anglo-Saxon Petroleum Company under Pyrula. Scrapped at Genoa by Henrico Haupt in 1933.	
Pontic	1894	1894–1930	394	Launched in 1894 by Harland and Wolff for White Star, sold to Rea Towing Co Ltd in 1919, sold to John Donaldson's Beardmore Steam Ship Co in 1925, chartered to Beardmore Donaldson Coal Trimmers Ltd and used as a collier and sand carrier. Scrapped at Clyde in 1930.	
Georgic	1895	1895–1916	10,077	Launched in 1899 by Harland and Wolff for White Star, collided Liverpool dock entrance in 1896 and 1901. Badly struck barque Oakhurst at Liverpool in 1902, collided with British steamer SS Saxon King off Flemish Cap, collided with the SS Kalabia in St. George's Channel in 1904, rammed the American SS Finance off Sandy Hook in 1908, sinking the latter. Served as cargo transport in WWI. Scuttled when confronted by the SMS Möwe on 10 December 1916.	
Delphic	1897	1897–1917	8,273	Launched in 1899 by Harland and Wolff for White Star, serves as troop carrier in Boer War and New Zealand routes. Sunk by UC-72 torpedo on 16 August 1917 off Bishop Rock, Isles of Scilly	
Cymric	1898	1898–1916	13,096	Launched in 1899 by Harland and Wolff for White Star, sunk by U-20 torpedo on 8 May 1916 off Fastnet Rock	
Afric	1898	1899–1917	11,948	Launched in 1899 by Harland and Wolff for White Star, serves as troop carrier in Boer War and as cargo on Australian routes. Sunk by UC-66 torpedo in English Channel in 1917.	
Medic	1899	1899–1928	11,973	Launched in 1899 by Harland and Wolff for White Star, serves as troop carrier in Boer War and as cargo on Australian routes. Strikes tanker Turbo off Kent in 1907. Sold to Norwegian A/S Hektor under Hektoria in 1928. Sold to British Hektor Whaling Ltd in 1932. Sunk by U-608 torpedo on 12 September 1942.	
Persic	1899	1899–1935	11,973	Launched in 1899 by Harland and Wolff for White Star, served as troop carrier in Boer War and as cargo on Australian routes. Scrapped at Netherlands by Hendrik Ido Ambacht in 1927.	
Oceanic	1899	1899–1914	17,272	Launched in 1899 by Harland and Wolff for White Star. Requisitioned by the Royal Navy in WWI. Ran aground and wrecked off Foula, Shetland on 8 September 1914.	

== 1900–1909 ==
Ship	Built	White Star service	GRT	Notes	Image
Runic	1900	1900–1930	12,482	Launched in 1900 by Harland and Wolff to White Star under Runic serving trans-Australian routes. Sold to Norwegian A/S Sevilla's British subsidiary Sevilla Whaling Co under New Sevilla in 1930, repurposed at Kiel later serving Christian Salvesen's Sevilla Co 1931–1940. Torpedoed by U-138 on 21 September 1940, sank off Malin Head when in tow for repairs.	
Suevic	1900	1900–1928	12,531	Launched in 1900 by Harland and Wolff for White Star serving trans-Australian routes, ran aground in 1907 off Plymouth, bow replaced and resumed service in 1908. Serves as a troop and cargo carrier in WWI. Sold to Norwegian Yngvar Hvistendahl's Finnhval A/S in 1928 under Skytteren repurposed as for whaling, scuttled off Sweden on April 1, 1942, when confronted by Germans.	
Celtic	1901	1901–1928	21,035	Launched in 1901 by Harland & Wolff for White Star serving trans-Atlantic routes, repurposed for WWI and struck a mine in 1917 off Isle of Man. Torpedoed by UB-77 in 1918 in Irish Sea. Struck Coast Line's Hampshire Coast in 1925 and struck by American Diamond Lines Anaconda off Fire Island. Ran aground off Cobh in 1928 and gradually scrapped till 1933. First of the Big Four.	
Athenic	1902	1902–1928	12,345	Launched in 1901 by Harland & Wolff for White Star serving trans-Australian routes and as a troop carrier in WWI, then sold in 1928 to Norwegian Hvalfangerselskapet Pelagos A/S under SS Pelagos. Torpedoed in 1944 and refloated, then scrapped in 1962.	
Corinthic	1902	1902–1931	12,367	Launched in 1902 Harland & Wolff for White Star and SS&A Line serving trans-Atlantic routes. Scrapped in 1931	
Ionic	1903	1903–1934	12,352	Launched in 1902 by Harland and Wolff for White Star serving trans-Australian routes and as a troop carrier in WWI, sold to Shaw, Savill & Albion Line in 1934. Scrapped at Osaka in 1936.	
Cedric	1903	1903–1931	21,073	Launched in 1902 by Harland and Wolff for White Star serving trans-Atlantic routes and as a troop carrier in WWI, collides with and sinks French schooner Yvonne-Odette, then collides with and sinks the Canadian Pacific Line Montreal off Morecambe Bay. Collides with Cunard Line's RMS Scythia in Queenstown in 1923, and collides with Van in Boston in 1926. Scrapped at Inverkeithing in 1932 by Thos. W. Ward.	
Victorian	1895	1903–1904	8,825	Launched in 1895 by Harland & Wolff for Leyland Line under Victorian, chartered by White Star. Renamed SS Russian in 1914 and torpedoed and sunk off Thessaloniki by UB-43 on 14 December 1916	
Armenian	1895	1903–1915	8,825	Launched in 1895 by Harland and Wolff for Leyland Line and managed by White Star, serves as troop carrier and POW transport in Boer War. Torpedoed and sank by U-24 on 28 June 1915 off Trevose Head and survivors rescued by Belgian President Stevens.	
Arabic	1903	1903–1915	15,801	Launched in 1902 by Harland and Wolff for Atlantic Transport Line originally under Minnewaska but IMM transferred ship to White Star. Torpedoed and sunk by U-24 off Kinsale on 19 August 1915	
Romanic	1898	1903–1912	11,394	Launched in 1898 by Harland & Wolff for Dominion Line under New England serving trans-Atlantic routes. Transferred to White Star under Romanic in 1903. Sold to Allan Line in 1912 under Scandinavian, serves as troop carrier in WWI, later serving Canadian Pacific Line after buyout. Scrapped in Hamburg in 1923.	
Cretic	1903	1903–1904	13,507	Launched in 1902 by R. & W. Hawthorn, Leslie and Company under Hanoverian. Transferred to Dominion Line in 1903 under Mayflower, then to White Star under Cretic serving till 1923, transferred to Leyland Line under Devonian serving till 1929 when scrapped by P & W McLellan at Borrowstounness.	
Republic	1903	1903–1909	15,400	Launched in 1903 by Harland and Wolff for White Star serving trans-Atlantic routes. Sunk following collision with Italian Lloyd Triestin's SS Florida off Nantucket on 24 January 1909	
Canopic	1900	1904–1925	12,268	Launched in 1900 by Harland & Wolff for Dominion Line under Commonwealth for Mediterranean routes. Transferred to White Star in 1903 under Canopic for trans-Atlantic routes. Scrapped at Briton Ferry in 1925.	
American	1895	1904–1923	8,249	Launched in 1895 by Harland and Wolff for West India & Pacific Steamship Co under SS American serving trans-Atlantic routes, sold to Leyland Line and serves as troop carrier in Boer War. IMM transfers ship to White Star under Cufic in 1904 and serves trans-Australian routes and serves as troop carrier in WWI and later cargo shipping. Sold in 1923 to Italian G.B.A Lombardo for scrapping, then sold in 1924 to Italian Soc. Anon. Ligure di Nav, A Vapore and serves again as Antartico. Sold again in 1927 to Italian E. Bozzo & L. Mortola under Maria Guilia. Laid up at Genoa in 1930 till scrapped at Genoa in 1933.	
Tropic	1896	1904–1923	8,249	Launched in 1896 by Harland and Wolff Originally as the SS European for West India and Pacific Steamship Company but bought by Leyland Line and IMM Co. transferred ship to White Star in 1907 under Tropic then to Italian owners in 1927 under Artico then Transilvania. Scrapped at Genoa in 1923.	
Baltic	1904	1904–1933	23,876	Launched in 1903 by Harland and Wolff for White Star serving trans-Atlantic routes and served as a troop carrier in WWI. Scrapped at Osaka in 1933.	
Adriatic	1906	1906–1935	24,541	Launched in 1906 by Harland and Wolff for service in White Star and continued serving after the Cunard-White Star merger until it was scrapped at Osaka in 1935.	
Gallic	1894	1907–1913	12,352	Launched in 1894 by John Scott & Co with the name Birkenhead, later sold to White Star in 1907 under the name SS Gallic until it was scrapped at Garston in 1914.	
Mersey	1894	1908–1915	1,809	Launched by Charles Connell and Company for Nourse Line in 1894. Sold to White Star in 1908 used as a cadet training vessel for Australian routes, sold in 1915 to Norwegian owners multiple times under Transatlantic and Dvergso. Scrapped in 1923.	
Laurentic	1908	1908–1917	14,892	Launched by Harland and Wolff in 1908 ordered by Dominion Line originally Alberta but IMM transferred ship to White Star under Laurentic. Repurposed by the Admiralty in WWI to transport German internees from Africa. Sunk by mines off Bermuda on 25 January 1917 transporting gold bullion.	
Megantic	1909	1909–1933	14,878	Launched by Harland and Wolff in 1908 ordered by Dominion Line originally Albany but IMM transferred ship to White Star under Megantic serving tran-Atlantic routes, later trans-Australian routes in joint service with Shaw, Savill & Albion Line. Repurposed as a troop carrier for the Admiralty, then serves economy cruises. Laide up at Firth of Clyde till sold for scrapping at Osaka in 1933.	

== 1910–1919 ==
Ship	Built	White Star service	GRT	Notes	Image
Zealandic	1911	1911–1926	8,090	Launched by Harland and Wolff in 1910 for White Star, serves cargo New Zealand routes jointly with Shaw, Savill and Albion Line, used as troop carrier in WWI. Sold to Aberdeen Line in 1926 under Mamilius. Sold back to SS&A in 1932 under Mamari, renamed 'Mamari III in 1934 serving Australian routes. Sold to the Admiralty in 1939 repurposed as decoy for HMS Hermes, before repurposing for cargo, it struck the Ahamo wreck sunken 3 months earlier, off Cromer, Norfolk when fleeing German attack on 3 June 1941 and was later torpedoed by an E-boat.	
Nomadic	1911	1911–1925	1,273	Launched in 1910 by Harland and Wolff for White Star, sold to Cherbourgeoise Transbordement in 1927 and transferred to Remorquage et de Sauvetage in 1934 under SS Ingenieur Minard, serving evacuations from Cherbourg in WWII. Serves SCSR till retiring in 1968, laid up in Le Havre till repurposed as a floating restaurant in 1974 on the Paris Seine. Purchased by the Titanic Belfast society in 2006 and restored in 2012 as a museum. (Note: only White Star Line vessel still existing)	
Traffic	1911	1911–1927	675	Launched in 1910 by Harland and Wolff in 1910 and serves White Star, used as troop carrier in WWI. Sold to Cherbourgeoise Transbordement in 1927 under Ingenieur Reibell, transferred to Remorquage et de Sauvetage in 1934. Repurposed as a minelayer under X23 but scuttled by French Navy in Cherbourg due to German onslaught. Raised by the Germans repurposed as coastal patrol, but torpedoed by British Navy. Raised again by German Navy but scrapped at Cherbourg.	
Olympic	1911	1911–1935	45,324	Launched by Harland and Wolff in 1910 serving White Star trans-Atlantic routes and collides with HMS Hawke in 1911, serves as troop carrier in WWI, and scrapped in 1935 at Jarrow then finally by Thos. W. Ward at Inverkeithing in 1937.	
Belgic	1902	1911–1913	9,748	Launched by New York SBC in under SS Mississippi serving Atlantic Transport Line. Transferred to Red Star Line in 1906 under Belgic, then to Red Star Line under Samland in 1911, then back to White Star under Belgic in 1913 serving until 1931, scrapped in Italy.	
Titanic	1912	1912	46,328	Launched by Harland and Wolff at Sir William Arrol & Co. Belfast yards. Struck an iceberg and sank on her maiden voyage with approximately 1500 lives lost.	
Ceramic	1912	1913–1934	18,400	Launched by Harland and Wolff in 1912 serving White Star Australian routes until sold to Shaw, Savill & Albion Line in 1934. Sunk by u-boat torpedo, 6–7 December 1942 near Newfoundland.	
Vaderland	1910	1914–1917	11,899	Launched by John Brown & Company in 1900, chartered by American Line for trans-Atlantic routes. Transferred to Red Star Line in 1903, serving until 1914. Transferred to Dominion Line in 1915 under Southland as a troop carrier. Attacked by UB-14 off Lemnos in the Aegean Sea in 1915, repaired and relaunched in 1916. Torpedoed and sunk by U-70 off Tory Island on 4 June 1917.	
Lapland	1909	1914–1920	17,540	Launched in 1908 by Harland and Wolff, serving trans-Atlantic routes for Red Star Line. Transferred to International Navigation Company in 1914 and then to Leyland Line in 1927 and then scrapped at Osaka.	
Britannic	1914	1915–1916	48,158	Laid down in 1911 by Harland and Wolff, launched in 1914 and completed in 1915 as a hospital ship. Mined and sunk off Kea in the Aegean Sea as a hospital ship in November 1916.	
Belgic	1914	1917–1923	27,132	Launched by Harland & Wolff in 1914 under Belgenland for IMM and completed in 1917 under Belgic as a troop carrier, then as a cargo/liner for trans-Atlantic routes. Transferred to Red Star Line under Belgenland in 1923. Transferred to Panama Pacific Line under Columbia. Bought by Douglas & Ramsey and scrapped at Firth of Forth in 1936.	
Justicia	1914	1917–1918	32,234	Laid down by Harland & Wolff for NASM in 1914 under Statendom but relinquished to Shipping Controller and completed in 1917, operated by White Star, serving as troop carrier under Justica. Attacked by UB-64 in July 1918 unscathed but torpedoed six times and sank in July 1918. NASM ordered a replacement in 1921, launched by Harland & Wolff in 1924 and completed in 1929	
Vedic	1918	1918–1934	9,302	Launched by Harland & Wolff in 1917 and ran aground off North Ronaldsay in the Orkney Islands in 1919. Served trans-Atlantic and Australian routes from 1920 to scrapping in 1934.	
Bardic	1918	1919–1925	9,332	Launched in 1918 and completed in 1919 by Harland & Wolff serving as troop carrier initially under War Priam, then under SS Bardic (1919-1925) running aground in 1924 off Australia. Sold to Aberdeen Line serving pleasure sailing (1925-1933) under Hostilius (1925-1926), then under Horatius (1926-1933). Sold to Shaw, Savill & Albion Co. Ltd. in 1933 under Kumara serving until 1937. Sold to Greek Fatsis M. in 1937 under Marathon. Sank by the Scharnhorst on 9 March 1941 off Cape Verdes	

== 1920–1932 ==
Ship	Built	White Star service	GRT	Notes	Image
Gallic	1918	1920–1933	11,905	Launched by Workman, Clark and Company in Belfast in 1918 for HM Shipping Controller, operated by White Star for the Admiralty under SS War Argus, purchased by White Star in 1919 under SS Gallic, serving Australian and Atlantic cargo routes. Sold in 1933 to Clan Line under Clan Colquhoun for cargo shipping, operated by Ministry of War Transport from 1941-1946. Sold to Panamanian Zarati Steamship Co. in 1947 under SS Ioannis Livanos. Sold in 1949 to Panamanian Two Oceans Navigation Co. under SS Jenny. Sold in 1951 to Indonesian Djakarta Lloyd NV under SS Imam Bondjal and under SS Djatinegra 1952-1955. Sold to Japanese breakers in 1955, but sank in 1955 due to engine flooding put at Lingayen Indonesia, refloated and towed to Hong Kong for scrapping	
Mobile	1909	1920	16,960	Launched in 1908 by Blohm+Voss for Hamburg America Line (HAPAG) and serves until 1915, laid in Hamburg, and war repatriated by U.S. government in 1919 serves as troop carrier under Mobile and relinquished to USSB, chartered briefly by White Star then sold to Byron Steamship Co. in 1920 under King Alexander serves under 1923, sold to United American Lines under Cleveland serves until 1926, sold to HAPAG, serves until 1931, laid up until 1933 when sold to Blohm+Voss for scrap.	
Arabic	1909	1920–1931	16,786	Launched in 1908 by AG Weser for Norddeutscher Lloyd and serves under Berlin until 1914 when appropriated by Germany Navy for war effort, laying sea mines. Interned at Trondheim for ungraceful stay, then repatriated to P&O Line in 1919, sold to White Star in 1920, serves until 1924 under Arabic, sold to Red Star Line in 1926 and serves until 1930, and scrapped in 1931 in Genoa.	
Haverford	1901	1921–1925	11,635	Laid and launched in 1901 by John Brown & Company and serves the International Mercantile Marine Co.'s White Star and fellow trusts, American Line, Red Star Line, and Dominion Line until 1915, and serves the Admiralty for war effort, then returned to civilian use. Scrapped in 1935 in Italy	
Homeric	1913	1922–1935	35,000	Built by Schichau-Werke for Norddeutscher Lloyd, launched in 1913 as the Columbus, awarded to White Star Line by the Allies as compensation for the Oceanic. Scrapped in 1936 at Inverkeithing.	
Majestic	1914	1922–1936	56,551	Keel laid down by Blohm+Voss for Hamburg America Line in 1913 and launched in 1914 as the Bismark for seatrials but never serving routes until 1922, when awarded as war reparations to and completed by White Star as compensation for the Britannic. Sold in 1936 to Thos. W. Ward for scrapping but to due legal code, sold to Royal Navy and converted for use as a sailing cadet training as the HMS Caledonia, sank due to fire in 1940 at Firth of Forth, raised in 1943 and scrapped in 1944 at Inverkeithing.	
Poland	1897	1922–1925	8,282	Transferred from the Red Star Line in 1922. Sold to Italy for scrap as SS Natale.	
Pittsburgh	1922	1922–1925	16,322	Laid down by Harland & Wolff at Belfast for IMM in 1913, work suspended in due to WWI and completed and launched in 1920 as the Pittsburgh, serving trans-Atlantic routes. Renamed Pennland in 1926 due to IMM"s subsidiary Red Star Line policy. Served as troop carrier to Africa, Caribbean, Nova Scotia and Mediterranean. Attacked by German bombers in 1941 off Agios Georgios Greece, damaged beyond repair, scuttled by HMS Griffin on 25 April 1941	
Doric	1923	1923–1935	16,484	Ordered by IMMC, laid in 1921 and launched in 1922 by Harland & Wolff and serves White Star 1923–1934, serving Cunard-White Star in 1935 until collision with the P&O Line's Viceroy of India, then sold to John Cashmore Ltd and scrapped at Cashmores Newport, Monmouthshire	
Regina	1917	1925–1929	16,313	Ordered by Dominion Line and launched in 1917 by Harland & Wolff, serves war effort as a troop carrier for British and North Atlantic Steam Navigation Company under Regina, transferred to Leyland Line in 1920 and serves from 1922 to 1925, transferred to White Star in 1926, serves til 1929, transferred to Red Star Line and serves 1930–1934 under Westerland, Red Star Line bought by Bernstein Line and serves 1935–1939, Bernstein's assets liquidated by Nazis and sold to Holland America Line and operates as a troop carrier in Indian Ocean, bought by British Navy in 1942 and operated as a munitions depot. Sold in 1946 to South Georgia Line, planned for whaling but instead sold to Hughes Bolckow and scrapped at Blyth in 1947.	
Delphic	1918	1925–1933	8,002	Laid in 1916 and launched in 1918 by Harland & Wolff, served Booth Line for war efforts under War Icarus, sold in 1919 to American Atlantic Transport Line under Mesaba, transferred to White Star under Delphic in 1925 for Trans-Pacific Australia routes, sold in 1933 to Clan Line to deliver same routes under Clan Farquhar, Clan Line merged with Cunard-White Star in 1948 and scrapped at Milford Haven under restructuring.	
Albertic	1920	1927–1934	18,940	Keel laid down in 1914 by AG Weser for Norddeutscher Lloyd. Construction halted due to WWI, then completed in 1920 and confiscated by British as reparations and begins service for Royal Mail Line in 1923–1927 as the Ohio then serves White Star until 1930, held at River Clyde until scrapped in Osaka in 1934.	
Calgaric	1918	1927–1934	16,063	Built by Harland & Wolff in 1917, and launched in 1918, assuming service with Pacific SN Co Line as the Orca, transferred to Royal Mail Line in 1923, transferred to Oceanic Sn Co Line in 1926, transferred to White Star Line in 1927 as the Calgaric, laid up 1930–1933, briefly resumes service, restructuring by Cunard-White Star has it then scrapped at Rosyth in 1934.	
Laurentic	1927	1927–1940	18,724	Launched in 1927 by Harland and Wolff serves Oceanic Steam Nav Co till transfer to Cunard-White Star in 1934 serving trans-Atlantic routes. Sold in 1939 to the Admiralty. When torpedoed by U-99 November 3–4, 1940, it was the last steamship built for the White Star Line and the last White Star Line ship to sink.	
Britannic	1929	1929–1949	26,943	Keel laid down by Harland & Wolff in 1927, launched in 1929, served trans-Atlantic routes until as a troop carrier and refugee evacuations in World War Two, serving routes from India to South Africa and held in reserve by the Ministry of War Transport post-war until 1947. Refitted by H&W at Bootle and served as a mail-carrier until 1950, serving pleasure cruises. Held in dock at New York in 1960 before scrapped in 1961 at Inverkeithing by Thos. W. Ward. Its bell is an artifact of Merseyside Maritime Museum	
Georgic	1932	1932–1949	27,759	Bombed and sunk in July 1941, salvaged by Shipbreaking Industries Ltd in October 1941, refloated and restored 1942–1944, resumed service as a troop carrier in 1945, resumed civil service in 1948, Scrapped in 1956.	

== See also ==
- List of Cunard Line ships
