= SS Doric (1883) =

British ocean liner operated by White Star Line

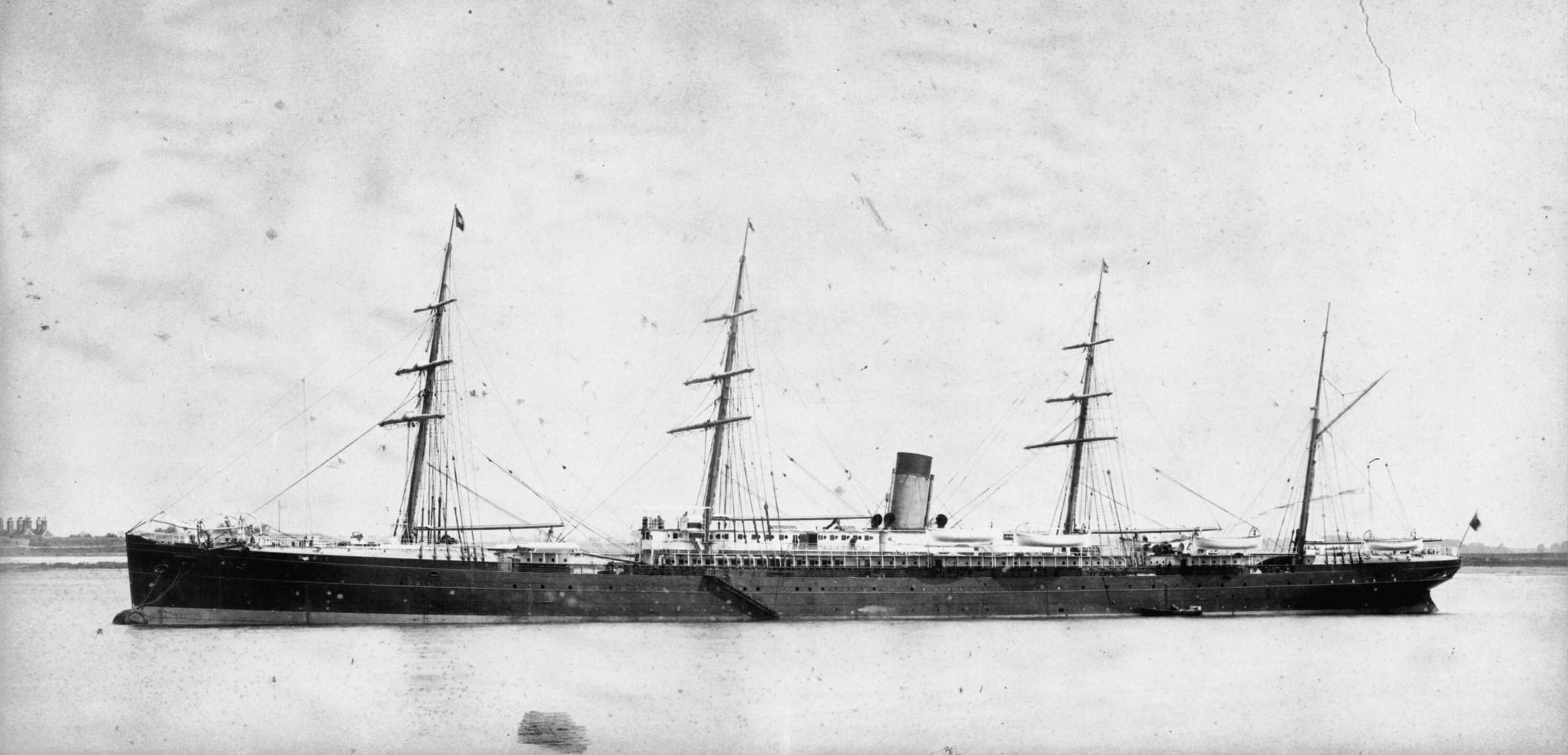
- SS Doric

History

United Kingdom
- Name: Doric
- Owner: White Star Line
- Operator: New Zealand Shipping Company; White Star Line; Shaw, Savill & Albion Line; Occidental and Oriental Steamship Company
- Port of registry: Liverpool
- Route: United Kingdom−New Zealand
- Builder: Harland and Wolff, Belfast
- Yard number: 153
- Launched: 10 March 1883
- Completed: 4 July 1883
- Maiden voyage: London−Wellington, 6 January 1885
- Out of service: 1906
- Fate: Sold to the Pacific Mail Steamship Company in 1906 and renamed Asia.

United States
- Name: Asia
- Owner: Pacific Mail Steamship Company
- Route: San Francisco, California−Hong Kong
- Acquired: 1906
- Out of service: 1911
- Fate: Wrecked 23 April 1911

General characteristics
- Type: Ocean liner
- Tonnage: 4,784 gross register tons (GRT)
- Length: 440.1 ft (134.1 m)
- Beam: 44.2 ft (13.5 m)
- Height: 28 ft (8.5 m)

SS Doric was a British ocean liner operated by White Star Line. She was put into service in 1883. Built by the Harland and Wolff shipyards in Belfast, she was the sister ship of the Ionic which was put into service a few months earlier. Although the original purpose of the construction of the two ships was not known with certainty, both began their careers chartered by the New Zealand Shipping Company which operated them on the route from London to Wellington.

As early as 1885, the Doric, like her sister ship and the Coptic, was assigned to the same route, but this time for the joint service provided by the White Star Line and the Shaw, Savill & Albion Line. The ship operated this service until she was refitted and modernised in 1895. Subsequently deemed superfluous for the New Zealand route, the Doric was chartered by the Occidental and Oriental Steamship Company between Hong Kong and San Francisco.

It was in 1906 that the Doric made her last crossing under this company, while the O&O gradually withdrew from the market. She was then sold to the Pacific Mail Steamship Company which employed her on the same route, this time under the name of Asia. On 23 April 1911, the ship ran aground on rocks. Her passengers came out unharmed from the accident, but the ship was quickly looted and set on fire by local fishermen.

== Characteristics ==
The Doric was a slightly larger version of the Arabic and the Coptic, measuring 134 metres long by 13.5 metres wide; she differed from the Ionic only by her slightly lower gross tonnage of 4,744 tons. However, this was increased to 4,784 tons after an overhaul. Like the two previous ships, she was designed to carry cargo in good quantity, as well as 70 first-class passengers. She could also embark 900 emigrants, and had a refrigerated hold intended for the transport of meat.

Externally, the ship was, like all ships of the time built for the White Star Line, an elongated ship, provided with a fairly low funnel in the colors of the company (brown ocher surmounted by a black cuff). The funnel was surrounded by four masts that could carry sails. The ship was mainly propelled by steam, her machines being among the first to be built by the Harland & Wolff shipyards after those of the Ionic. They were alternative compound machines operating a propeller capable of propelling the ship at 13 knots (24 km/h; 15 mph). In 1895, they were replaced by triple expansion machines, which were more modern and economical, and allowed her to reach a speed of 14 knots (26 km/h; 16 mph).

== History ==
=== Construction and service to New Zealand ===
The ship was constructed by Harland and Wolff in Belfast and was launched in 1883. Doric was the sister ship to the Ionic. These were enlarged versions of two ships commissioned in 1881, the Arabic and the Coptic. The ship was constructed of steel, a first for the ship building company, whose previous designs had been constructed only in iron. The ship was the first White Star Line ship to bear the name Doric, with a later vessel built in 1923 also sharing the name. The Doric was launched on 10 March 1883; with her sister ship launched two months earlier. She is one of the first ships whose machines were built by the shipyards themselves. These were, until then, built by outside workshops. On the following 4 July, the ship left Belfast for London, making a stopover at Holyhead to embark Thomas Henry Ismay, president of the White Star Line, and several dignitaries accompanying him to visit the ship.

Ismay's plans when he ordered these ships were unknown, but it was likely that he originally planned the project for the route to New Zealand. At that time, in fact, two companies, the Shaw, Savill Line and the Albion Line had just merged to form the Shaw, Savill & Albion Line to compete with the New Zealand Shipping Company, which was preparing to have five brand new ships delivered to them. The route from London to Wellington therefore seemed poised to prosper. Following the amalgamation in November 1882, the owners of the Shaw, Savill & Albion Line entered into negotiations with Ismay to plan a joint service, benefiting from the experience of the White Star Line. An agreement was quickly formed between the two companies

The Doric then continued her charter contract throughout 1884, and joined the joint service on 6 January 1885, on the Wellington route, passing on the outward journey through Tenerife, Cape Town and Hobart, and to return via Cape Horn, Montevideo and Rio de Janeiro. Crews were provided by White Star, but ships were managed by Shaw, Savill and Albion. The crossings were calm and uneventful.

In 1893, the White Star acquired a new ship on the route, the Gothic. The Doric and the Coptic were then no longer useful on this route where the traffic was down.

=== Service on the Pacific and fate ===
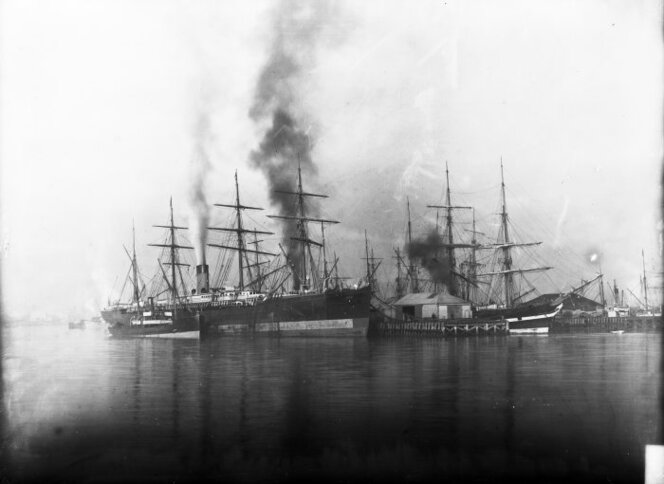
SS Doric at Wellington

In May 1895, the Doric was returned to Harland & Wolff shipyards, where her facilities were improved, and its machines changed to the more economical alternative triple-expansion machines, which increased her tonnage and speed. In 1896, Doric was again transferred, this time to the joint White Star and Occidental and Oriental Steamship Company service running between San Francisco and Hong Kong. The New York Times reported on 6 July 1902 that Doric had arrived in San Francisco with a particularly large cargo of 2,693 tons, which included the largest ever shipment of opium, at the time, of 33,210 pounds, and 129,492 chests of tea.

Doric left San Francisco for her last White Star and Occidental & Oriental voyage on 8 August 1906. In 1906 Doric was sold to the Pacific Mail Steamship Company for £50,000, who renamed her Asia. Still assigned to the same route, the ship made her first crossing on 11 June 1907 under her new colors, after a rapid overhaul. On 23 April 1911, Doric ran aground in foggy conditions and was wrecked near Taichow Islands, Wenzhou, South China. Once all of the crew and passengers had been safely rescued, the ship was looted by local fishermen, who subsequently burnt the remains of the vessel.

== Legacy ==
The ship in Rudyard Kipling's poem "McAndrew's Hymn" was inspired by the Doric; in a letter to illustrator Howard Pyle he wrote "-but it may help you a little to know that the ship "McAndrew’s Hymn" belongs to is the old Doric, once an Atlantic White Star I think, and now a Shaw, Savill, Albion boat running to New Zealand via the Cape of Good Hope and home round the horn..."

== Bibliography ==
- Anderson, Roy Claude (1964). White Star. Prescot: T. Stephenson & Sons Ltd. OCLC 3134809.
- de Kerbrech, Richard (2009). Ships of the White Star Line. Shepperton: Ian Allan Publishing. ISBN 978-0-7110-3366-5.
- Eaton, John; Haas, Charles (1989). Falling Star, Misadventures of White Star Line Ships. Patrick Stephens Ltd. ISBN 1-85260-084-5.
- Haws, Duncan (1990). White Star Line. Merchant Fleets. Vol. 17. Hereford: TCL Publications. ISBN 0-946378-16-9. OCLC 50214776.
