= SS Spaarndam =

A number of steamships were named Spaarndam, including:

- SS Spaarndam (1881), launched as SS Arabic in 1881 for the White Star Line. Sold to the Holland America Line in 1890 and renamed to Spaarndam. Broken up in 1901.
- SS Spaarndam (1922), launched in 1922 for the Holland America Line. Struck a mine and sank in the North Sea in 1939 with the loss of five lives (four crew and the only passenger).
