= SS Ionic (1883) =

British ship of the White Star line

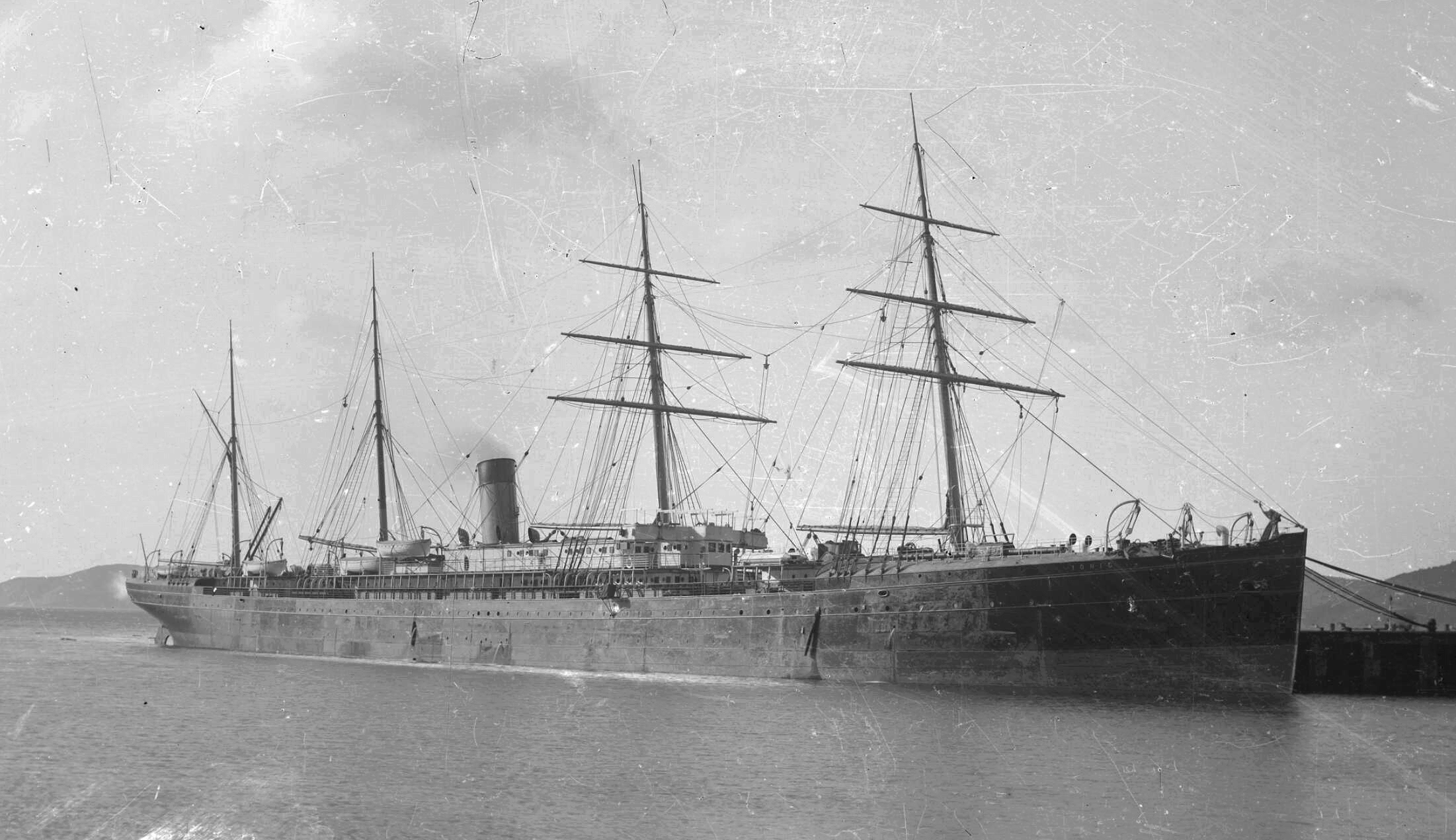
- SS Ionic in Port Chalmers

History

United Kingdom
- Name: SS Ionic (1883–1900); SS Sophocles (1900–1908)
- Owner: White Star Line (1883–1900); Aberdeen Line (1900–1908)
- Operator: Chartered by New Zealand Shipping Company (1883–1884); Chartered by Spanish government (1900)
- Builder: Harland & Wolff, Belfast
- Yard number: 152
- Launched: 11 January 1883
- Completed: 28 March 1883
- Maiden voyage: April 1884 London to Wellington
- Fate: Broken up in April 1908

General characteristics
- Class & type: Cargo liner
- Tonnage: 4,753 GRT
- Length: 439 ft 11 in (134.09 m)
- Beam: 44 ft 2 in (13.46 m)
- Speed: 14 knots (26 km/h; 16 mph)

SS Ionic was a cargo liner initially in service with White Star Line from 1883 until 1900. She was used on the company's joint route to New Zealand with the Shaw, Savill & Albion Line. She was sold to the Aberdeen Line in 1900 and renamed SS Sophocles, and was withdrawn for service in 1906 and scrapped in 1908.

== Service ==
Ionic was built by Harland & Wolff, Belfast and launched on 11 January 1883, being delivered to her new owners on 28 March 1883. She was almost immediately chartered for service with the New Zealand Shipping Company, along with the White Star ships Doric and Coptic, to fill a gap while the company was awaiting the delivery of new ships. After being inspected by the Prince of Wales, Ionic began her maiden voyage from London to Wellington, sailing via the Cape of Good Hope, in April 1884, setting a new record for the passage.

She was placed on the regular joint White Star – Shaw, Savill & Albion route from December 1884, managed by Shaw, Savill & Albion but crewed by White Star Line personnel. She had to be towed to Cape Town after her propeller shaft snapped in 1893, and in 1894 she was extensively refitted by Harland and Wolff. In December 1899 she transported horses to the Cape during the Second Boer War, and in April 1900 was chartered by the Spanish government to repatriate troops from Manila after the Spanish–American War. Ionic was sold later that year to the Aberdeen Line as a replacement for their Thermopylae, which had been lost in September 1899. The Aberdeen Line renamed her SS Sophocles. She made her final voyage in August 1906, and was scrapped by Thos. W. Ward at Morecambe, Lancashire in April 1908.
