= SS Samland =

American cargo ship

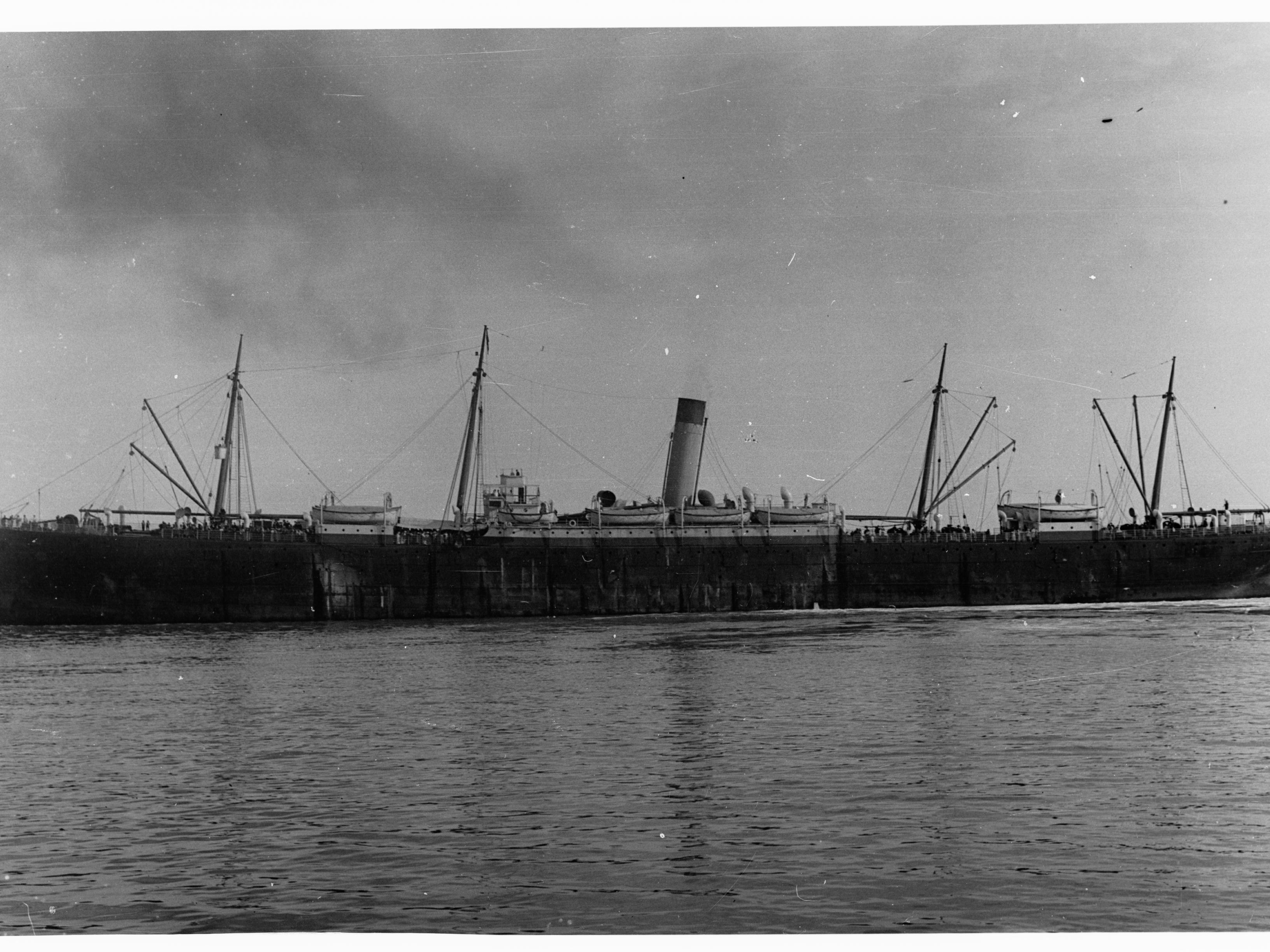
- Belgic at Outer Harbor

History
- Name: Mississippi (1902–06); Samland (1906–11, 1913–31); Belgic (1911–13)
- Owner: Atlantic Transport Line (1902–06); Red Star Line (1906–11, 1913–31); White Star Line (1911–13)
- Operator: Atlantic Transport Line (1902–06, 1914–16); Red Star Line (1906–11, 1913–14, 1919–31); White Star Line (1911–13); Belgian Relief (1916–19)
- Ordered: 1901
- Builder: New York Shipbuilding Corporation
- Cost: $729,000
- Yard number: 8
- Laid down: January 2, 1902
- Launched: December 15, 1902
- Acquired: April 9, 1903 (ATL); July 7, 1906 (RSL); August 30, 1911 (WSL); December 1913 (RSL)
- Maiden voyage: April 16, 1903
- Home port: (United States) Baltimore (1902–06); (United States) New York City (1906–10); (Belgium) Antwerp (1910–11, 1913–14, 1919–31); (United Kingdom) Liverpool (1911–13); (United Kingdom) London (1914–19)
- Identification: Code letters: KSHG
- Fate: Scrapped in Italy, 1931

General characteristics
- Type: Steam cargo ship
- Tonnage: 9,710 or 9,748 gross register tons
- Length: 490 ft 5 in (149.5 m)
- Beam: 50 ft 3 in (15.3 m) or 58 ft 2 in (17.7 m)
- Height: 39 ft 5 in (12.0 m)
- Decks: 3
- Installed power: 2 double ended and 2 single ended boilers; 18 corrugated furnaces; triple expansion engines
- Propulsion: Twin screws
- Speed: 14 kn (25.9 km/h; 16.1 mph)
- Capacity: 1,900 passengers

SS Samland was an American-built cargo ship. Built in 1902 by the New York Shipbuilding Corporation at Camden, New Jersey, the ship was owned and operated by the Atlantic Transport Line under the name SS Mississippi until 1906; that year, she was transferred to the Red Star Line and renamed Samland. She was briefly transferred to the White Star Line in 1911 and renamed SS Belgic until she returned to the Red Star Line in 1913 and resumed the name Samland. The ship served with the Red Star Line until 1931 when she was broken up in Italy.

== Construction ==
In 1901, Bernard N. Baker of the Atlantic Transport Line ordered six steamships from American shipyards. One of the ships, a cargo ship named Mississippi, was laid down on January 2, 1902, at Camden, New Jersey by the New York Shipbuilding Corporation. The ship, with the yard number of 8, was launched on December 15, 1902. Mississippi had three sister ships: SS Massachusetts, SS Maine, and SS Missouri.

The ship cost $729,000 to build, which was higher than the cost for a Harland & Wolff equivalent ship which cost between $486,000 and $534,000. She was built with money that was loaned by J.P. Morgan & Co. Mississippi, along with the five other steamships, was ordered because Baker believed that the Ship Subsidy Bill, proposed by United States Senator William P. Frye, would make the U.S. federal government subsidize the construction and operation of American registered ships; the bill passed by a 42–31 majority in the Senate on March 14, 1902, but was not presented to the House of Representatives because of strong opposition from the House Committee on Merchant Marine and Fisheries. As a result, no subsidies ever manifested.

== Characteristics ==
The ship had a length of 490 feet 5 inches (149.5 m), a height of 39 feet 5 inches (12.0 m), and a beam of 50 feet 3 inches (15.3 m) or 58 ft 2 in (17.7 m). Her tonnage was 9,710 or 9,748 gross register tons; 7,559 tons under the deck and 6,353 net tons. She had two tanks; one held 980 tons and the other held 1,015 tons. The hull was fitted with three steel decks, three cement bulkheads, and a double bottom. Its code letters were KSHG. When configured to carry passengers, the ship could carry 1,900 3rd-class passengers. She had four masts and one funnel.

The ship was powered by two double-ended boilers, two single-ended boilers, and eighteen corrugated furnaces; new double-ended boilers were installed in 1906. The boilers and furnaces powered triple expansion engines which drove twin screws. It had a grate surface of 318 square feet (29.5 m^{2}) heating surface of 14,106 square feet (1,310.5 m^{2}). The ship could reach a speed of 14 knots (25.9 km/h; 16.1 mph).

== Service history ==
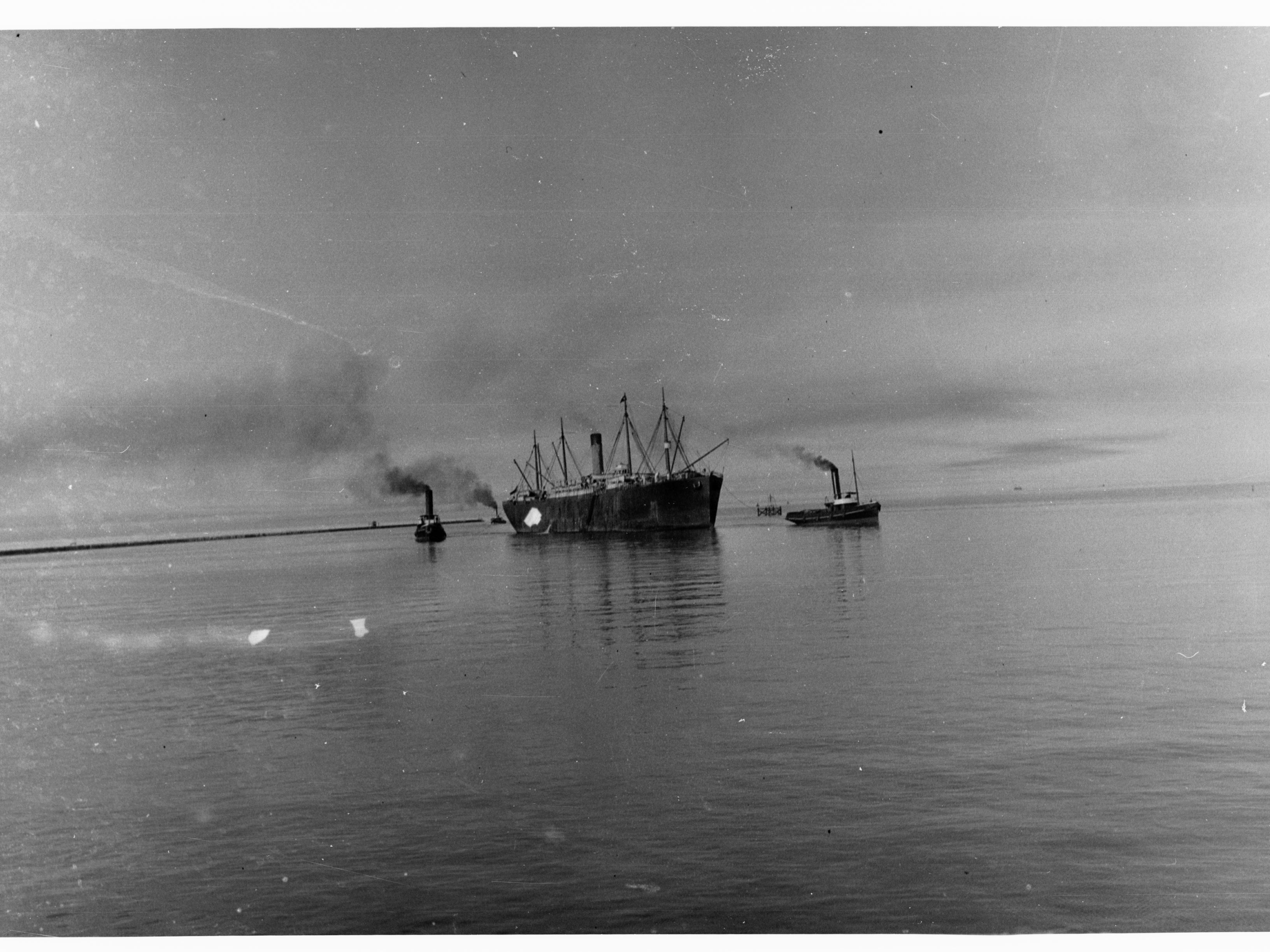
Belgic in Australia

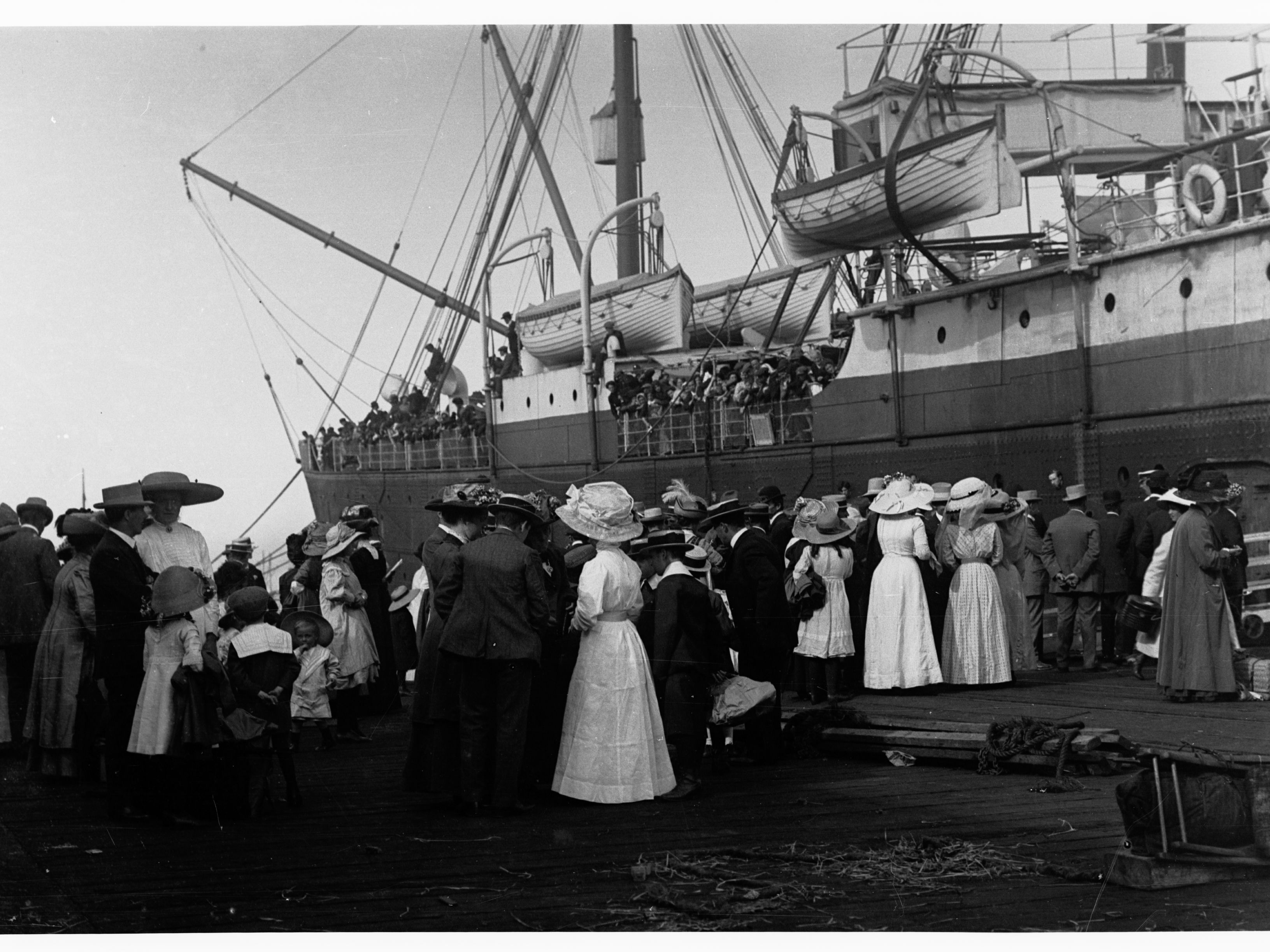
Belgic at Port Adelaide

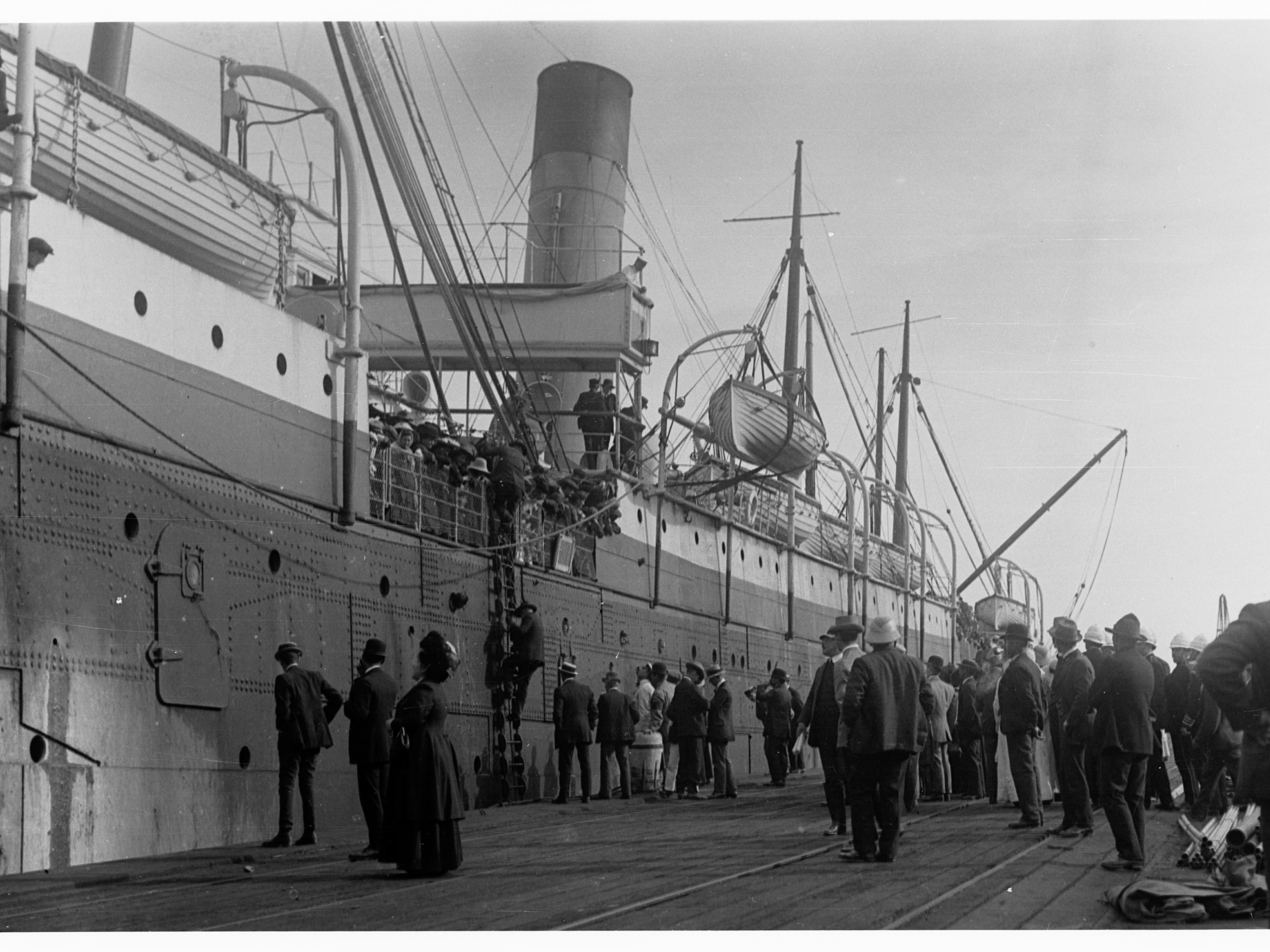
Belgic at Outer Harbor

Mississippi was delivered to the Atlantic Transport Line on April 9, 1903. She was the second ship owned by the line to bear the name Mississippi. The ship began her maiden voyage from Baltimore to London on April 16, 1903, and she later traveled that same route two more times.

On July 7, 1906, Mississippi was transferred to the Belgian Red Star Line and later renamed to Samland. The ship operated a route from Antwerp to New York City, which later included a stopover in Dover. The ship remained registered in the United States until 1910 when she was registered in Belgium. In 1911, Samland operated a route traveling from Hamburg to Antwerp, Quebec, and Montreal two times.

On August 30, 1911, Samland was transferred to the British White Star Line and later renamed Belgic, the third such ship owned by the line to bear that name. The ship operated a route from Liverpool to Wellington, and also operated a route between the United Kingdom and Australia.

In December 1913, Belgic was returned to the Red Star Line and reverted to the name Samland. She resumed her Antwerp to New York route between December 1913 and October 1914. When World War I began and the ship's homeport of Antwerp was captured by the Germans, Samland sailed a route from London to New York, which was operated by the Atlantic Transport Line, between October 1914 to February 1916. Beginning in March 1916, Samland was operated by the Commission for Relief in Belgium and was sailed between New York, Falmouth, and Rotterdam. The ship resumed her Antwerp to New York route in February 1919.

Samland sailed her final voyage on February 6, 1931, traveling from Antwerp to New York, Halifax, London, and back to Antwerp. The ship was sold for scrap in April 1931, being broken up in Italy later that year.

== See also ==
- List of White Star Line ships
