= RMS Gaelic (1885) =

1885–1907 British ship

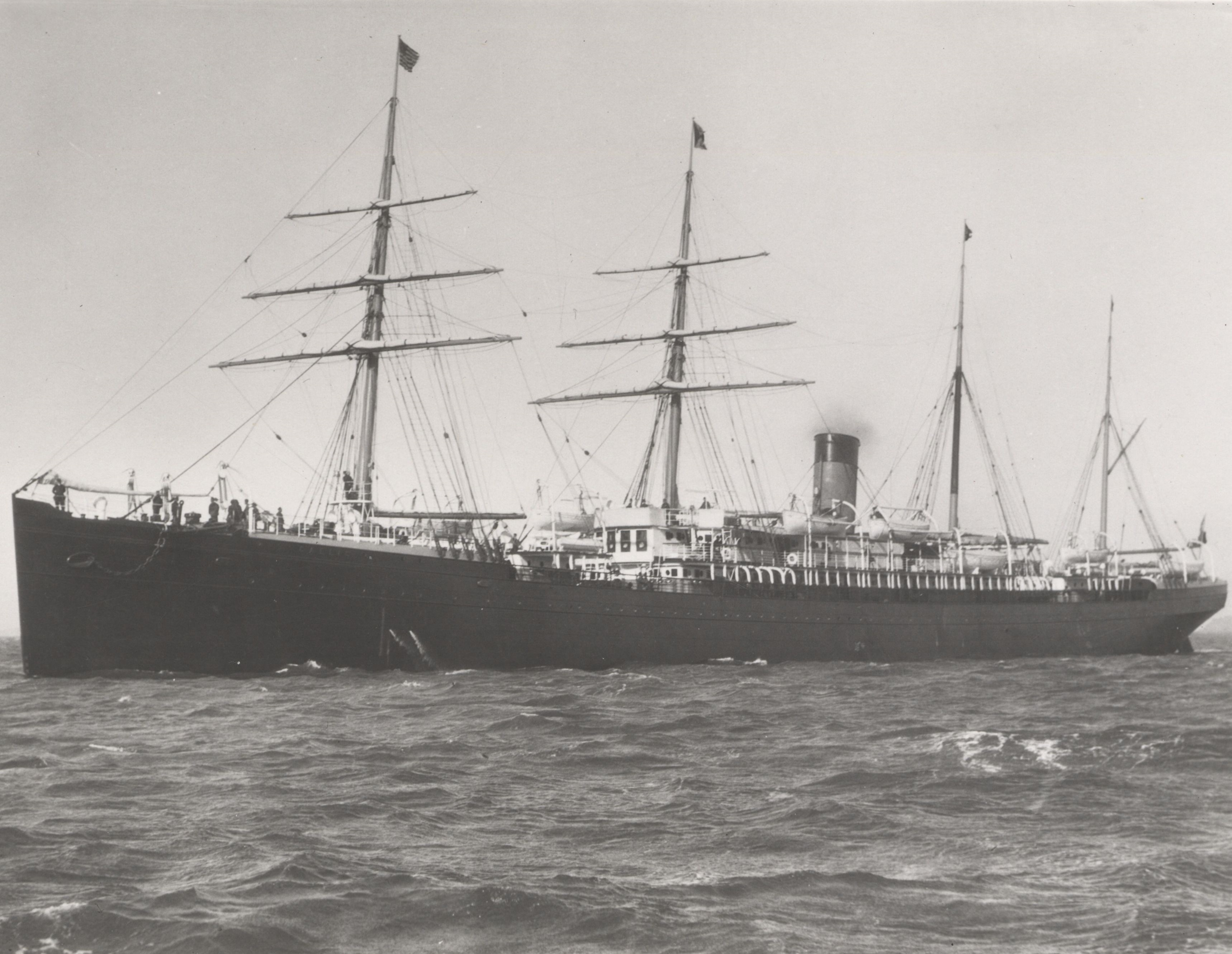

History

United Kingdom
- Name: RMS Gaelic (1885–1905); SS Callao (1905–1907)
- Owner: White Star Line (1885–1905); Pacific Steam Navigation Company (1905–1907)
- Operator: Occidental and Oriental Steamship Company (1885–1904); Pacific Steam Navigation Company (1905–1907)
- Builder: Harland & Wolff, Belfast
- Yard number: 172
- Launched: 28 February 1885
- Completed: 18 July 1885
- Fate: Scrapped in September 1907

General characteristics
- Type: Ocean liner
- Tonnage: 4,206 GRT
- Length: 420 feet 4 inches (128.12 m)
- Beam: 42 feet 5 inches (12.93 m)
- Installed power: 2 Compound steam engines; 2800 indicated horsepower
- Propulsion: Single Screw
- Sail plan: 4 masts 2 square rigged
- Speed: 13 knots (24 km/h; 15 mph)

RMS Gaelic was a passenger and cargo liner built for the White Star Line. She transported the first 102 Korean immigrants to the United States. Sold in 1905 for further service in the Pacific, she was scrapped in 1907.

== History ==
RMS Gaelic was built by Harland & Wolff of Belfast, Northern Ireland, for the White Star Line and measured 4,206 tons. She was virtually identical to her sister ship Belgic. The ship was chartered to the Occidental and Oriental Steamship Company for service on Pacific crossings from 1885 to 1904.

On 14 August 1896 she grounded at Shimonoseki, Japan and had to be towed to Nagasaki for repairs.

The passage of 102 Korean immigrants to Hawaii began on 29 December 1902 in Nagasaki, Japan, and ended on 13 January 1903, when the ship arrived in Honolulu. The Gaelic was refitted by Harland & Wolff in 1905 and sold to the Pacific Steam Navigation Company in the same year and renamed Callao, but was retired and broken up at Briton Ferry in 1907.
