= SS Bardic =

Greek cargo ship

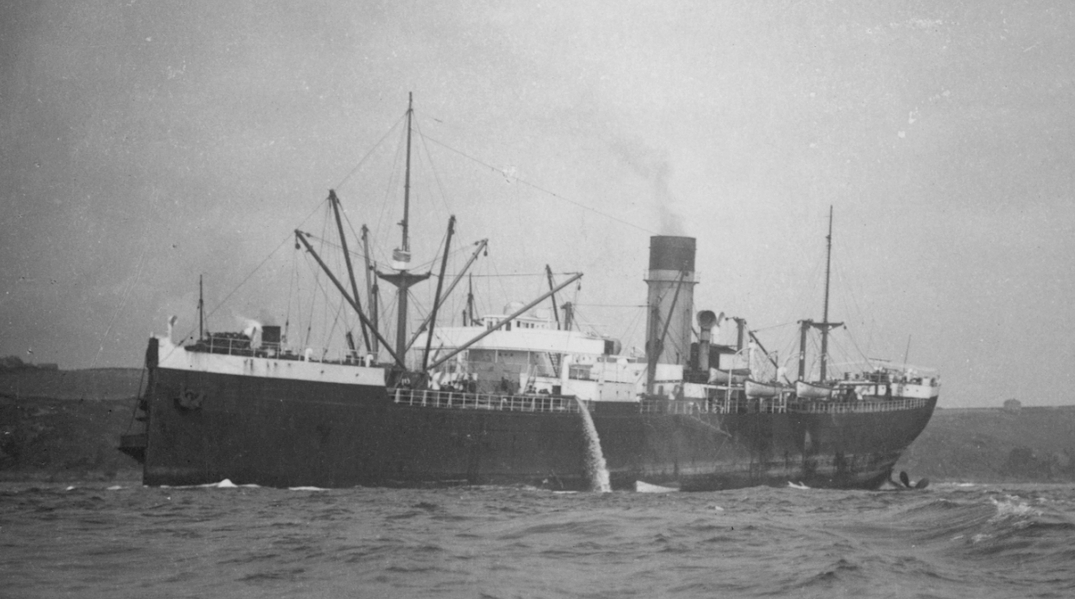

History
- Name: (United Kingdom) War Priam (1918-1919); (United Kingdom) Bardic (1919-1925); (United Kingdom) Hostilius (1925-1926); (United Kingdom) Horatius (1926-1933); (United Kingdom) Kumara (1933-1937); (Greece) Marathon (1937-1941)
- Owner: White Star Line (1919-1925); Aberdeen Line (1925-1933); Shaw, Savill & Albion Co. Ltd. (1933-1937); Fatsis M. (1937-1941)
- Port of registry: Piraeus, Greece
- Builder: Harland & Wolff Ltd.
- Yard number: 542
- Launched: 19 December 1918
- Completed: 13 March 1919
- Identification: SVVL; Official number: 904
- Fate: Shelled and sunk by battleship Scharnhorst, 9 March 1941

General characteristics
- Type: Cargo ship
- Tonnage: 8,010 GRT
- Length: 137.3 metres (450 ft 6 in)
- Beam: 17.8 metres (58 ft 5 in)
- Depth: 11.3 metres (37 ft 1 in)
- Installed power: 2 x Triple expansion engines
- Propulsion: Two screw propellers
- Speed: 11 knots

SS Bardic was a Greek cargo ship that was shelled and sunk by the German battleship Scharnhorst in the Atlantic Ocean northwest of Cape Verde on 9 March 1941.

== Construction ==
Bardic was launched on 19 December 1918 and completed on 13 March 1919 at the Harland & Wolff Ltd. shipyard in Belfast, United Kingdom. The ship was 137.3 metres (450 ft 6 in) long, had a beam of 17.8 metres (58 ft 5 in) and had a depth of 11.3 metres (37 ft 1 in). She was assessed at 8,010 GRT and had 2 x Triple expansion engines driving two screw propellers. The ship could generate 1138 n.h.p. with a speed of 11 knots.

== 1924 incident ==
While Bardic was on route from Australia to the United Kingdom on 31 August 1924, she ran aground on Stag Rock off Lizard Point, Cornwall. Her crew evacuated the ship yet her officers remained onboard until 8 September. The ship was eventually refloated on 29 September and towed to Falmouth, Cornwall where she was beached to await repairs.

== Sinking ==
On 9 March 1941, Bardic (then named Marathon) encountered the German battleship Scharnhorst in the Atlantic Ocean northwest of Cape Verde. The German battleship shelled and sunk the Marathon, with all the crew being taken as prisoners of war.

== Wreck ==
The wreck of Bardic lies approx. at (21°N 25°W).
