= SS Belgic (1873) =

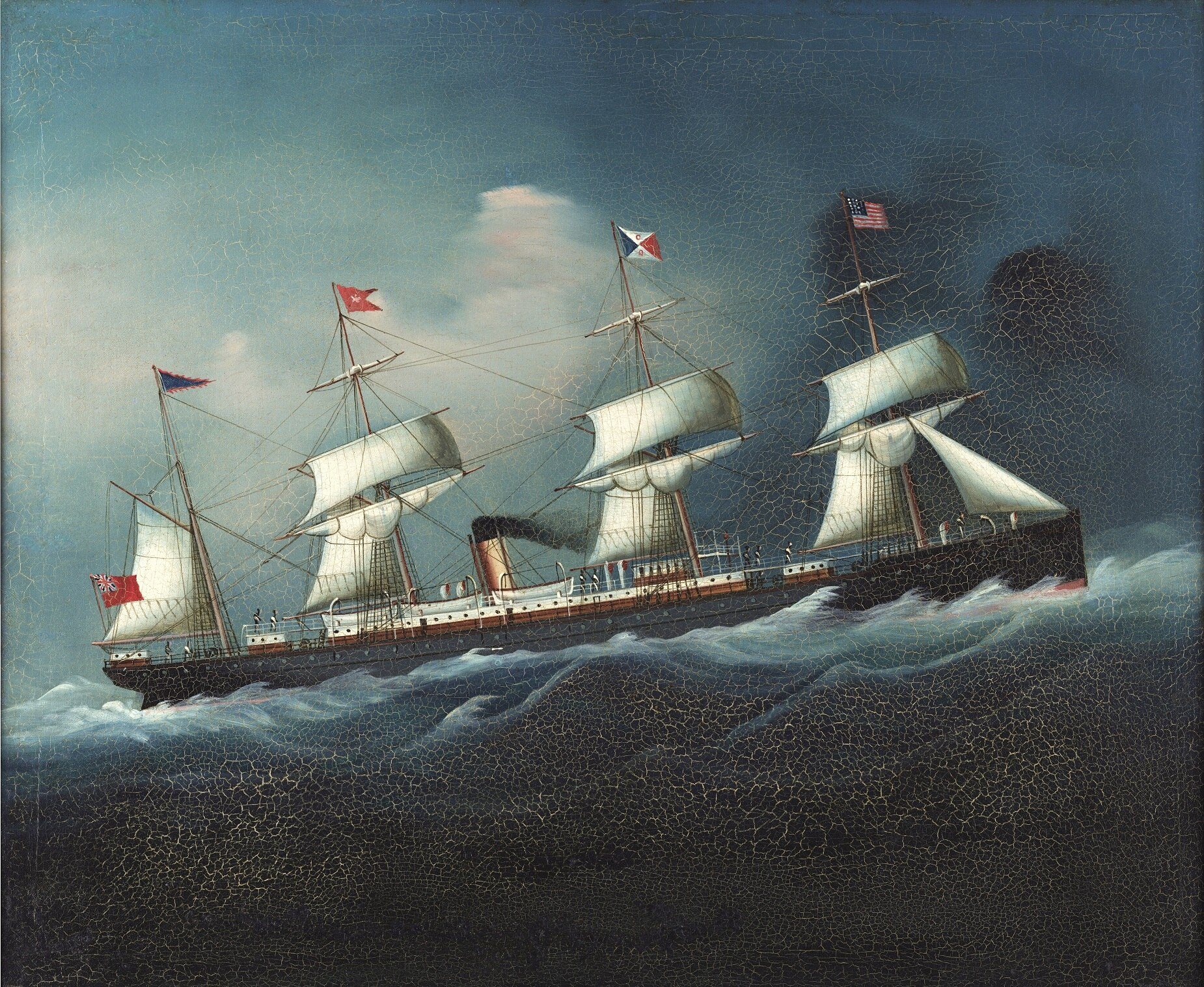

History
- Name: Belgic (1873–1883); Goefredo (1883–1884)
- Owner: White Star Line (1873–1883); Cia de Nav. 'La Flecha' (1883–1884)
- Operator: White Star Line (1873–1875); Occidental and Oriental Steamship Company (1875–1883); Cia de Nav. 'La Flecha' (1883–1884)
- Port of registry: Liverpool
- Builder: Harland & Wolff, Belfast
- Yard number: 81
- Launched: 14 January 1873
- Completed: 29 March 1873
- Maiden voyage: 29 March 1873
- In service: 29 March 1873
- Out of service: 26 February 1884
- Fate: Wrecked on 26 February 1884
- Notes: First of four "Belgic"s for the White Star Line.

General characteristics
- Type: Cargo ship
- Tonnage: 2,652 GRT
- Length: 370 feet (112.78 m)
- Beam: 36 feet 4 inches (11.07 m)
- Propulsion: Single screw
- Speed: 12 knots (22 km/h)
- Capacity: 40 first-class passengers

SS Belgic was a steamship of the White Star Line. The first of the company's four ships bearing this name, she was first assigned along with her sister ship the Gaelic on the route to France and South America, a new route of the company. This service was short-lived, however, and at the end of the year, the Belgic was the last White Star Line steamer to serve on this route. She was then moved to the North Atlantic route.

The following year, she and her sister ship were considered surplus, and so were loaned to the fledgling Occidental and Oriental Steamship Company, which chartered them on the Pacific route. This agreement continued for eight years, before the two ships were withdrawn from service in 1883 and sold to the Spanish company Cia de Nav. La Flecha. Renamed Goefredo, the ship would go on to have a career that was ultimately short-lived. She experienced two successive groundings, the second in February 1884 proving fatal to the ship.

== History ==
=== Career under White Star Line ===
The Belgic and her sister ship, the Gaelic, were originally under construction in the Harland & Wolff shipyards on behalf of a Liverpool company, the J. J. Bibby. The two ships were, however, bought by White Star Line even before their launch. Shortly after the launch of the Gaelic, the Belgic, like her, received a compound machine built by a company in Liverpool and was launched on 14 January 1873. Like the other ships of the company at the time, she was propelled by steam via a propeller, but also under sails thanks to her four masts. The ship sported a shape close to those of the Oceanic-class, with a tapered shape (her ratio between length and breadth was 10 to 1). She was originally intended to be only a cargo ship, however White Star Line added cabins to accommodate 40 first-class passengers.

When it acquired this ship, White Star Line had been trying somehow to establish, since the end of 1872, a service to South America, briefly inaugurated by the Republic, the Asiatic and the Tropic. It was within this framework that the Belgic left, on 29 March 1873, for her maiden voyage between Liverpool and Valparaíso. By this time, however, Thomas Henry Ismay and his associates had already abandoned the idea of having their larger ships frequented this route and were gradually withdrawing from it. The Belgic was the last steamship to remain there, until December 1873, after which the company only operated sailboats there. The Belgic was then moved to the route between Liverpool and New York, on which she made a single crossing in May 1874 before being moved with the Gaelic to the London – New York route. It was during her first crossing on this route that she rescued the Spanish steamer Tornas, which had broken down, and towed her to the US.

=== Charter, sale, and loss ===
Despite this service, the Belgic, like her sister ship, remained surplus ships to the company, a situation which was further reinforced in 1875 when the Germanic was put into service, following her sister-ship, the Britannic, which had arrived the previous year. The company thus tried to find a use for the surplus vessels. The opportunity arose that same year when George Bradbury, president of the Occidental and Oriental Steamship Company asked Ismay to set up a regular service on the Pacific Ocean. White Star Line then agreed to let the new company charter the Gaelic, the Belgic, but also the prestigious Oceanic.

On 29 May 1875, the two ships were therefore chartered on the route between San Francisco, Yokohama, and Hong Kong, originally for a five-year contract that was then extended. For the Belgic, an uneventful period began, and the charter contract was extended to eight years.

In 1883, the Belgic (like the Gaelic) was sold to the Compañia de Navigacion La Flecha in Bilbao for £30,000. She then continued her career under the Spanish flag with the new name Goefredo. This new career turned out to be short-lived, however. On 27 January 1884, she ran aground while leaving Santiago de Cuba, and returned to Liverpool for repairs. When she left this port on 26 February for Havana, she ran aground again in the mouth of the River Mersey. This time, too much damage led to the permanent loss of the ship.

== Bibliography ==
- Anderson, Roy Claude (1964). White Star. Prescot: T. Stephenson & Sons Ltd. OCLC 3134809.
- de Kerbrech, Richard (2009). Ships of the White Star Line. Shepperton: Ian Allan Publishing. ISBN 978-0-7110-3366-5.
- Eaton, John; Haas, Charles (1989). Falling Star, Misadventures of White Star Line Ships. Patrick Stephens Ltd. ISBN 1-85260-084-5.
- Haws, Duncan (1990). White Star Line. Merchant Fleets. Vol. 17. Hereford: TCL Publications. ISBN 0-946378-16-9. OCLC 50214776.
