= SS Gaelic (1872) =

Steamship of the White Star Line built by Harland and Wolff of Belfast

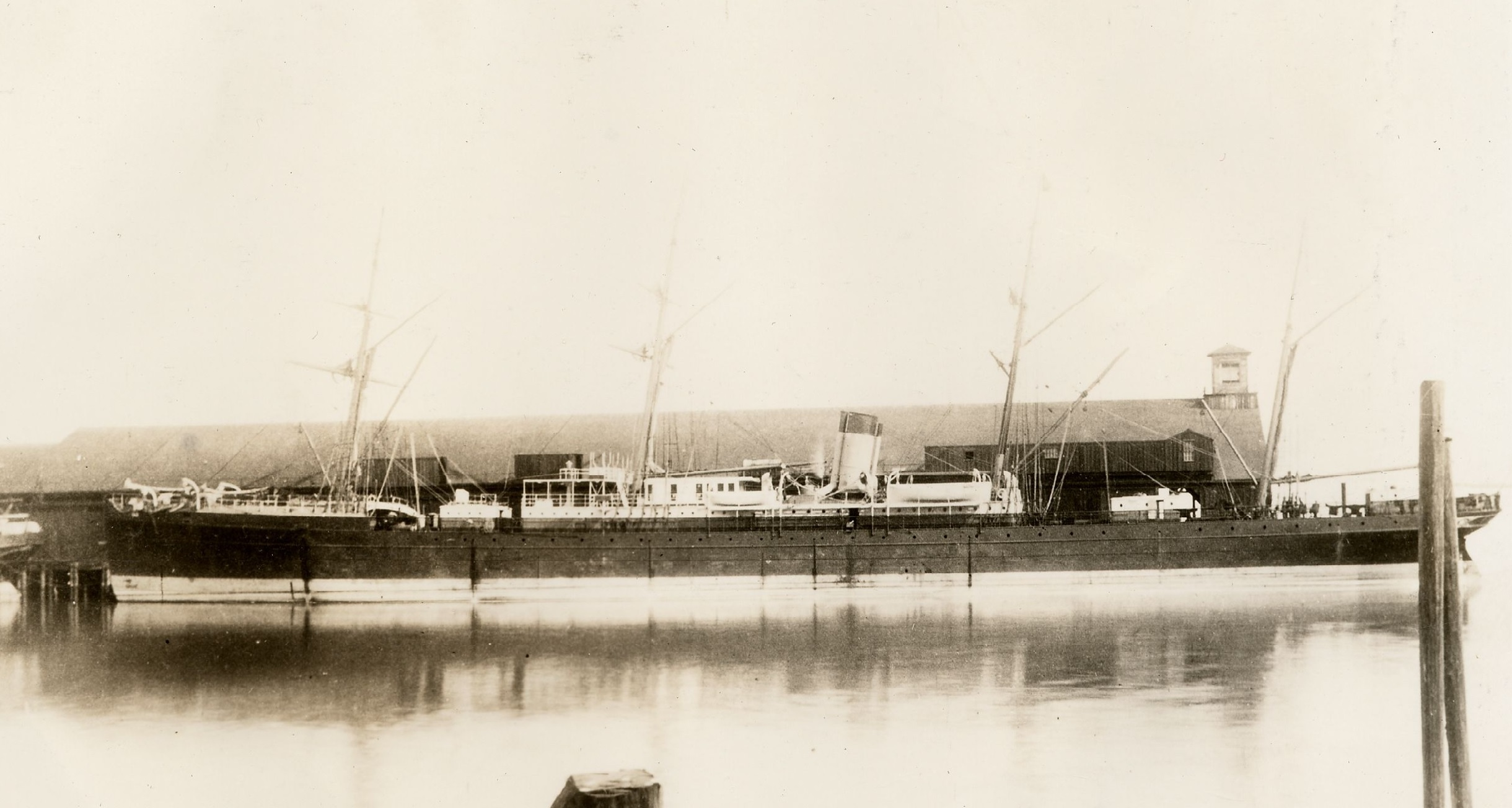
- Gaelic at San Francisco in 1882

History

United Kingdom
- Name: Gaelic
- Owner: White Star Line
- Port of registry: Liverpool
- Route: Liverpool – Valparaíso (1873); Liverpool-New York (1873–1874, 1875); London-New York (1874); San Francisco-Yokohama-Hong Kong (1875–1883)
- Builder: Harland & Wolff, Belfast; engines by J. Jack Rollo & Co, Liverpool
- Yard number: 80
- Launched: 4 October 1872
- Completed: 7 January 1873
- Acquired: 7 January 1873
- Maiden voyage: 29 January 1873
- Fate: Sold 1883
- Notes: First 'Gaelic' of White Star Line

Spain
- Name: Hugo
- Owner: Cia. de Navigacion la Flecha of Bilbao
- Acquired: 1883
- Fate: Ran aground 24 September 1896; Sold for scrapping 9 December 1896

General characteristics
- Class & type: Cargo/passenger freighter
- Tonnage: 2,658 gross register tons
- Length: 378 ft (115 m)
- Beam: 36 ft (11 m)
- Installed power: Sail; Compound-expansion steam reciprocating engine, producing 1,800 ihp
- Propulsion: single screw
- Sail plan: four masts (rigged for sail)
- Speed: 12 kn (22 km/h; 14 mph)
- Capacity: 40 1st-class
- Notes: iron construction, single funnel

SS Gaelic was a steamship of the White Star Line, built by shipbuilders Harland & Wolff of Belfast.

The Gaelic (later the Hugo), was originally one of a pair of ships built by Harland and Wolff for the J.J. Bibby Company of Liverpool. Along with her sister ship, which was renamed SS Belgic, she was bought while still building by White Star for their South American routes. She was launched on 4 October 1872, though without a name. Completed on 7 January 1873, she made her maiden voyage from Liverpool to Valparaiso on 29 January. However, White Star decided to abandon this route shortly after, and she was transferred to the Liverpool-New York run, making her first voyage on 10 July 1873. Gaelic made eight round voyages on this route.

On 15 January 1874, while making an eastbound crossing, she came to the assistance of the larger White Star ship SS Celtic when the latter vessel lost her propeller blades after striking wreckage in the Irish Sea. She towed the Celtic into Queenstown. From 3 June to 2 November 1874, she made four round voyages on the London-New York run, resuming her original run on 24 December of that year. On this occasion, she made two round voyages.

After the Britannic and Germanic entered service in 1874 and 1875, the new, faster and larger vessels made all previous White Star ships redundant, including Gaelic. On 29 May 1875, Gaelic, along with her sister ship Belgic and the company's first vessel Oceanic, was chartered to the Occidental and Oriental Steamship Company for their Pacific routes. She was put on the San Francisco-Yokohama-Hong Kong run and was caught in a gale on 20 November, which damaged the after part of her wheelhouse and blew away her trysail. On 11 May 1883, while steaming from San Francisco to Hong Kong, Gaelic put into the Chinese port of Hankow after losing her propeller shaft; she was likely forced to complete her voyage under sail.

She was sold later that year for £30,000, along with Belgic, to the Cia. de Navigacion la Flecha of Bilbao and renamed SS Hugo. After running aground on Terschelling Island in the Netherlands on 24 September 1896, she was declared a total loss. After refloating, she was auctioned for scrap on 9 December 1896 and towed to Amsterdam, where she was broken up.
