= Occidental and Oriental Steamship Company =

- House flag
- Industry: Transportation
- Founded: 1874
- Founder: George Bradbury
- Defunct: 1908
- Successor: Pacific Mail Steamship Company
- Headquarters: San Francisco
- Area served: Pacific Ocean
- Services: Cargo and passenger
- Owner: Central Pacific Railroad & Union Pacific Railroad

The Occidental and Oriental Steamship Company (sometimes abbreviated to O&O) was an American shipping company founded in 1874 by US railroads wishing to provide competition to the Pacific Mail Steamship Company which had not complied with its obligations to them. Chartering vessels from different companies, the most important being the British White Star Line, the company quickly became financially successful, against the expectations of its founders.

Having succeeded in its primary objective, the O&O proved a serious competitor to the Pacific Mail, to the point that in 1900, the vice president of the latter became its president. In the following years, Pacific Mail having commissioned more powerful ships, the O&O gradually ended its chartering contracts. On October 30, 1906, the SS Coptic made the company's last crossing, which nevertheless continued to advertise sailings until July 1908.

== History ==
=== Founding and early success ===
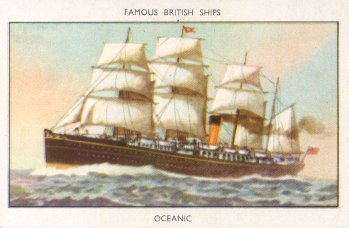
The Oceanic, of the White Star Line, was the flagship of the O&O for over twenty years.

The Occidental and Oriental Steamship Company (O&O) was founded in late 1874, at the initiative of George Bradbury, former president of the Pacific Mail Steamship Company. This company had signed agreements with several US railroads, ensuring that its passengers from Asia would use the transcontinental railway lines to travel from the West Coast to the East Coast once landed in San Francisco. The agreement, set up at the completion of the railway line in 1869, had proved effective until 1873, when Pacific Mail, after commissioning new vessels, decided that their passengers could travel more profitably by the isthmus of Panama rather than take the transcontinental train. In order to threaten the place of the Pacific Mail on the route from Hong Kong to San Francisco, and thus force it to respect its agreements, the Central Pacific and the Union Pacific united to form the O&O with an equity capital of ten million dollars shared between them. Bradbury becoming the president of the new company.

Bradbury immediately travelled to London in search of charter contracts. He had a meeting in October 1874 with the chairman of the White Star Line, Thomas Henry Ismay, which lead to a two-year charter agreement for three vessels: two cargo-liners, the SS Gaelic and the SS Belgic; also the RMS Oceanic, the first luxury liner of the company, which had become redundant on the North Atlantic route. This last ship providing the O&O with a prestige vessel for its service. With great pomp, the Oceanic left Liverpool for Hong Kong, to commence operations on its new route with a stop in Yokohama en route to San Francisco. It set a Pacific crossing record of 16 days and 10 hours, 8 days less than the ships of the Pacific Mail. In 1876 it reduced that to 14 days and 15 hours. This success laid the foundations of a long collaboration between the two companies, White Star supplying British officers while O&O provided the Chinese crews.

The success of the first voyage of the Oceanic was enough to allow the company to achieve its goal even before the ship had docked in San Francisco, Pacific Mail recognized defeat and sign a contract with the O&O to operate a joint service on the route. In the following years, however, the managers of Pacific Mail expressed discontent with the contract and threatened to break it so O&O remained active as a precaution. The agreement with White Star continued and four more ships were chartered: the SS Arabic and SS Coptic in 1881 and the new SS Belgic and RMS Gaelic in 1885. Contracts were also placed with other British and US companies, but White Star was still predominant and Oceanic remained the most prestigious ship of the company until her retirement in 1896.

=== Reconciliation with Pacific Mail ===
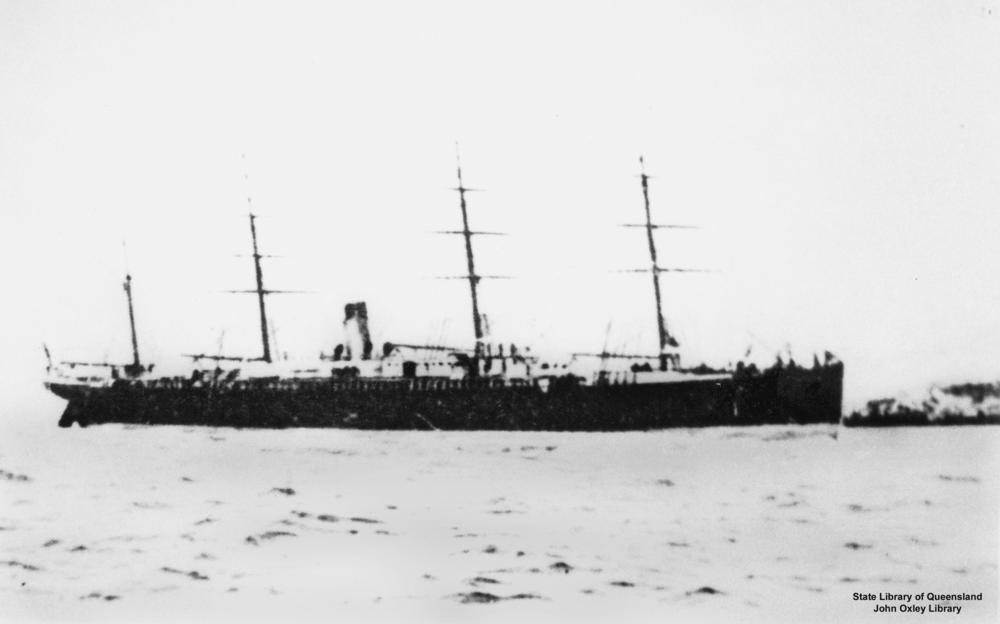
SS Coptic operated the last service for the company.

Transporting passengers and goods, the O&O proved to be profitable. Its founders had expected a loss of around $100,000 per year, accepting it as the price to pay to compete with the Pacific Mail, but the company exceeded their expectations and finally proved beneficial. In the 1890s, Pacific Mail, despite their joint service, protested that the O&O carried three times more passengers and cargo than itself. Pacific Mail, for their part, diversified by adding a stop in Honolulu, then others in Kobe, Nagasaki and Shanghai. It also made agreements with the Japanese company Toyo Kisen Kaisha.

In 1900, the links between O&O and its rival became closer as the general manager and vice president of Pacific Mail, Schwerin, was appointed president of the O&O. At the same time, it was faced with competition from the ever-larger ships of Pacific Mail and began to divest itself of its charter contracts, curtailing that of Gaelic in 1904. The service of O&O was then operated by the Doric and Coptic. It was the latter that undertook, on 30 October 1906, the last voyage for the company. Both remaining ships were sold to Pacific Mail which renamed them Asia and Persia respectively.

Despite this, advertisements for the O&O continued to be published in San Francisco until 1908. Two days before the publication of the last advert, on 23 July 1908, the last formal board meeting of the company was held.

== See also ==
- Pacific Mail Steamship Company

== Bibliography ==
- Anderson, Roy (1964). White Star. T Stephenson & Sons.
- de Kerbrech, Richard (2009). Ships of the White Star Line. Shepperton: Ian Allan Publishing. ISBN 978-0-7110-3366-5.
