= SS Royal Standard =

Nineteenth-century Steamship

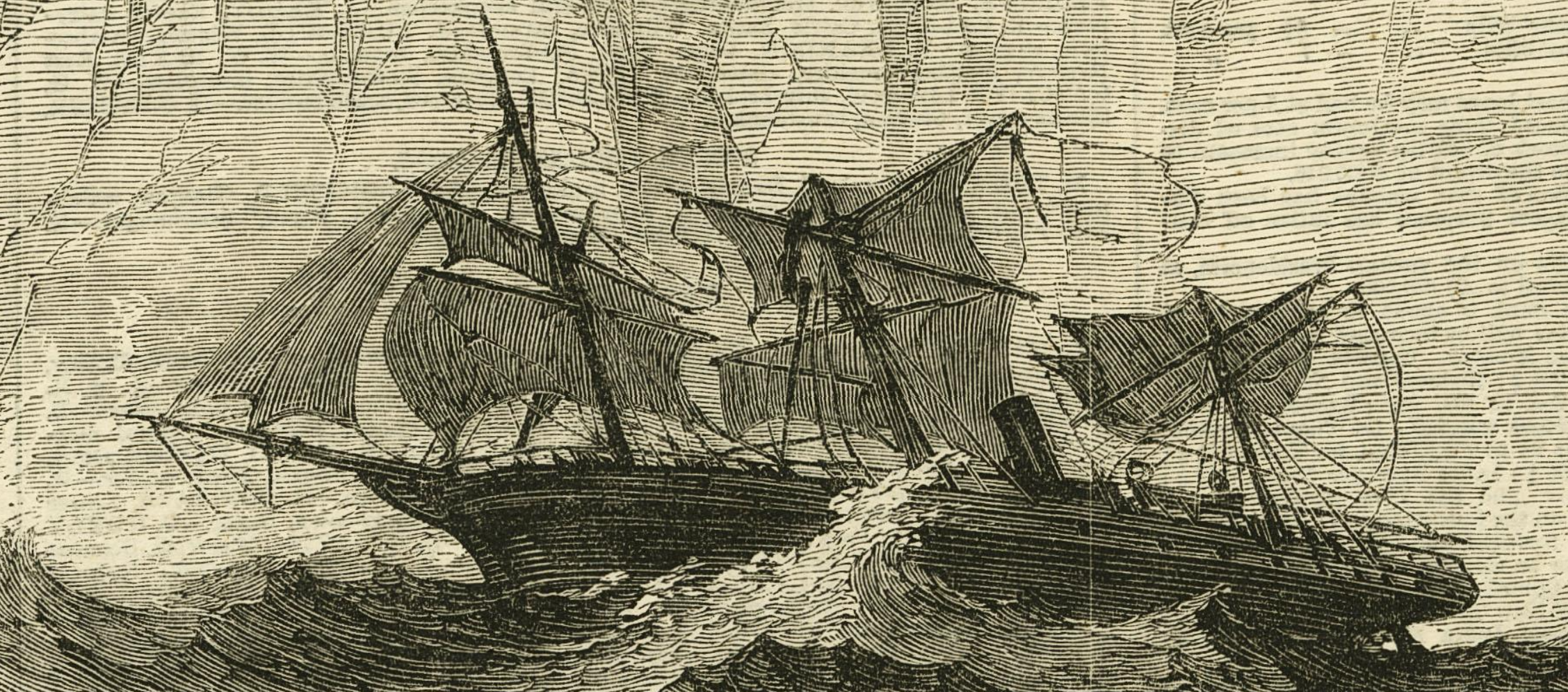

History

United Kingdom
- Name: SS Royal Standard
- Owner: Henry Wilson & Chambers (1863–1867); CM Palmer (1867–1869)
- Port of registry: Liverpool
- Route: Liverpool-Melbourne
- Ordered: 1862
- Builder: Palmer Bros & Co
- Way number: 125
- Laid down: 1862
- Launched: 1 August 1863
- Completed: November 1863
- Acquired: November 1863
- Maiden voyage: 23 November 1863
- In service: 1863
- Out of service: 1869
- Identification: Registry Number 47558
- Fate: Wrecked 1869
- Notes: First steamship for the White Star Line

General characteristics
- Type: Auxiliary steamship
- Tonnage: 2,033 GRT; 1598 NRT
- Length: 255.0 ft (77.72 m)
- Beam: 40.6 ft (12.19 m)
- Depth: 27.5ft (8.3 m)
- Decks: 3
- Installed power: 250hp
- Propulsion: Single screw steam engine
- Speed: 10 knots
- Capacity: 40 saloon, 800 steerage

SS Royal Standard was an auxiliary steamship of the White Star Line, built in 1863 by Palmer Brothers & Company in Tyneside with an iron hull. She was launched on 1 August 1863, and completed with a screw steam engine by JP Balmer and Company of Jarrow.

== Details ==
She was fitted with 3 cylindrical boilers, providing 60 lbs pressure to her high pressure inverted steam engine. The small machinery allowed her to carry a greater quantity of cargo, though meant her steam propulsion was slower to other steamships of the time. Her saloon and sleeping berths for saloon class, and second cabin were well ventilated, and lit by oil lamps. Her accommodation was described as 'magnificent' and 'fitted in such a style' that there is 'nothing further to be desired'. She had a single deckhouse running the majority of the ships length, which contained second cabin forward, saloon class aft and also housed the saloon class dining saloon. The iron ship also contained 4 iron bulkheads, which increased the safety of her.

== White Star career ==
Royal Standard departed on her maiden voyage for the White Star Line on 23 November 1863, departing Liverpool for Melbourne, Australia. During the maiden trip, her captain E.J Allen died and was replaced by G. H Dowell for the rest of the voyage, as well as the return trip. She departed Melbourne on 21 March 1864, on the return trip of her maiden voyage due to return to Liverpool, carrying a cargo of wool and 20,000 ounces of gold. On 4 April 1864, between Melbourne and the Cape Horn, the ship entered a haze around 11AM, then soon dense fog. As the ship was doing 10 knots under wind only, an enormous wall of ice 600 ft (183m) was spotted straight ahead. Dowell put her hard to starboard, and the ship hit the iceberg broadside. The mast tops were damaged badly, as well as the starboard side of the ship. After 45 minutes of struggling, her propeller was re-installed, and she steamed away from the iceberg to Rio de Janeiro for repairs.

The Royal Standard arrived at Rio on 9 May, where she was quickly repaired, and departed with 350 tons of coal on 12 May. She returned to Liverpool on 19 June 1864. She was then put on the transatlantic for one voyage, sailing to New York departing 23 May 1866, where she performed badly due to her slow speed. She departed Liverpool on her last round trip to Melbourne on 27 September 1866.

== Later career and fate ==
Due to the collapse of the White Star Line in 1867, the Royal Standard was sold away in 1867 to C.M Palmer of Newcastle Her engine was removed in 1867. converting her to exclusively sail.

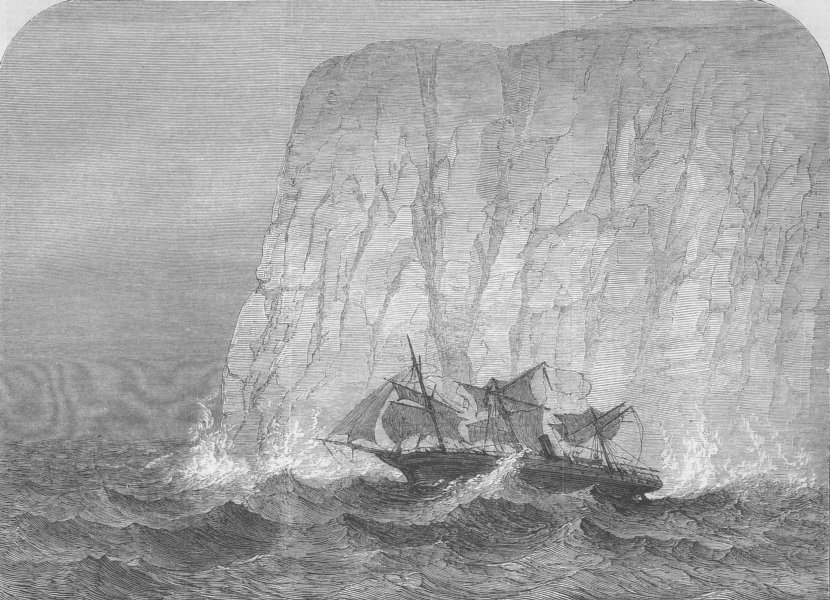
The Screw Steam-Ship Royal Standard in collision with an Iceberg on the home voyage from Melbourne. Illustrated London News 1864

She departed from Gravesend on her final voyage on 12 August 1869, with 28 passengers and around 60 crew. On 30 September 1869, in poor weather, her masts were destroyed, and she was put under jury rigging. Additionally, all but one of her four lifeboats had been destroyed. On 10 October 1869 the ship ran onto a sandbank off São Tomé Island. The one lifeboat left the stranded ship around 10:00am with a tin of biscuits, but no water. Upon beaching, the lifeboat tipped and 8 women on board drowned.

The remaining survivors on the Royal Standard were rescued on the 13th by the Brazilian brigantine Camponeza, and the ship soon broke in half with her bow buried under the sand, and her stern sinking deeper.
