= SS Coptic =

Ship of the White Star Line

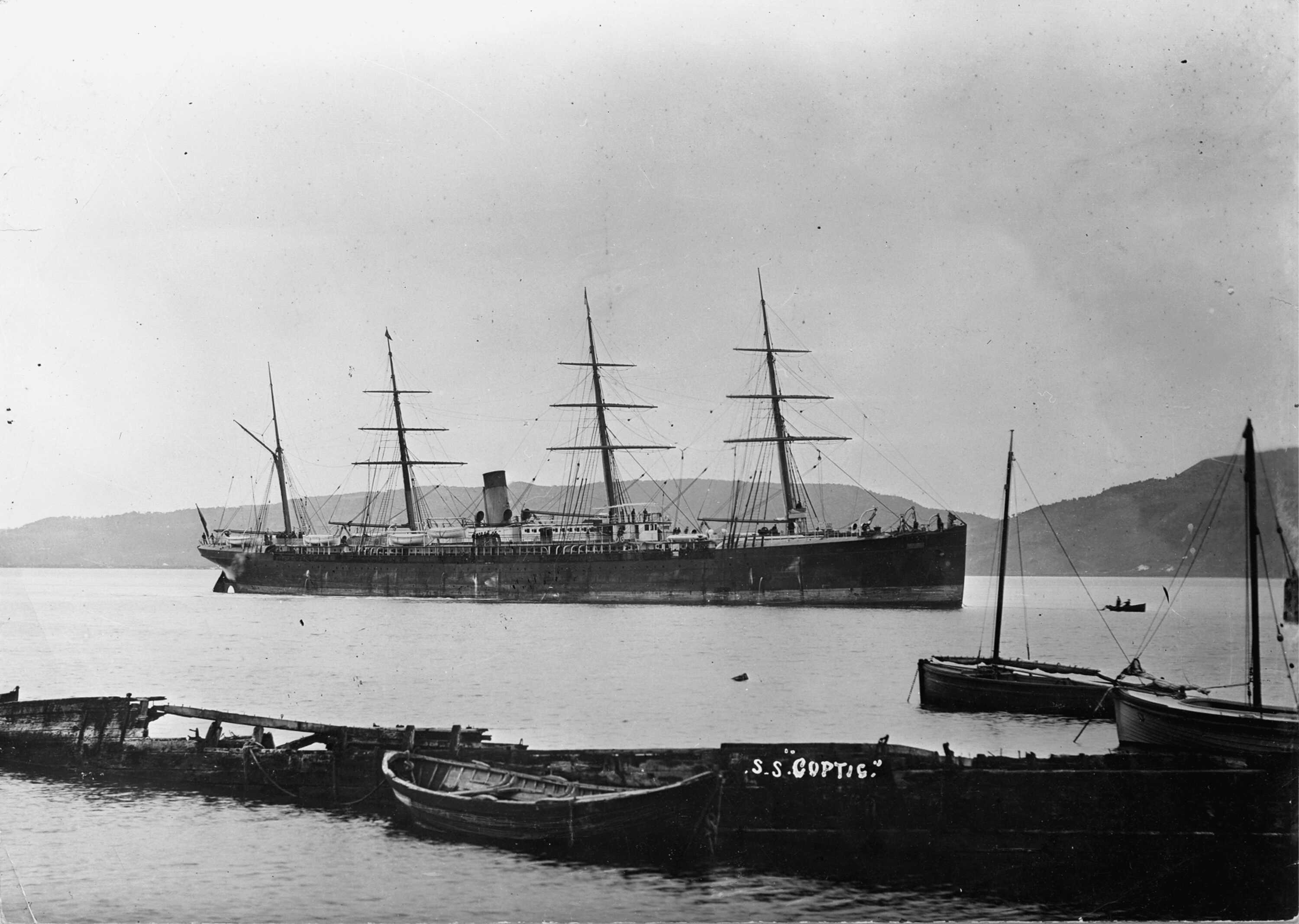
- SS Coptic

History

United Kingdom
- Name: Coptic
- Owner: Oceanic Steam Navigation Co.
- Operator: White Star Line; Occidental & Oriental Steamship Co.; New Zealand Shipping Co.; Shaw, Savill & Albion Co.; Japanese Steam Ship Co.
- Port of registry: Liverpool
- Route: Liverpool–New York (1881); San Francisco–Hong Kong (1882–1883); Outbound: London–Plymouth–Tenerife–Cape Town–Hobart–New Zealand (Port Chalmers, Lyttelton, Wellington and/or Auckland; Napier occasionally); Inbound: Cape Horn–Montevideo–Rio de Janeiro–Tenerife–Plymouth–London (1884–1895).
- Builder: Harland & Wolff, Belfast
- Yard number: 142
- Launched: 10 August 1881
- Acquired: 9 November 1881
- Maiden voyage: 16 November 1881
- Out of service: 30 October 1906
- Fate: Sold December 1906

United States
- Name: Persia
- Owner: Pacific Mail Steamship Company
- Port of registry: London
- Route: San Francisco-Hong Kong
- Acquired: December 1906
- Home port: San Francisco
- Fate: Sold 1915

Japan
- Name: Persia Maru
- Owner: Oriental Steam Ship Co.; (Toyo Kisen Kabushiki Kaisha)
- Port of registry: Yokohama
- Route: Yokohama–San Francisco–Hong Kong (1915–1922); Yokohama-Netherlands East Indies (1922–1924)
- Acquired: 1915
- In service: 1915
- Out of service: December 1924
- Fate: Scrapped at Osaka 1926

General characteristics
- Tonnage: 4,448 GRT; 2,670 NRT
- Length: 430 ft 2 in (131.11 m)
- Beam: 42 ft 2 in (12.85 m)
- Depth: 31 ft 6 in (9.60 m)
- Propulsion: As built; 2 × 2-cylinder compound steam engines; Single propeller; From 1894; Harland & Wolff triple expansion steam engine
- Speed: 13 kn (24 km/h; 15 mph) (as built)

SS Coptic was a steamship built in 1881, which was successively owned by the Oceanic Steam Navigation Company, the Pacific Mail Steamship Company, and the Japanese Oriental Steam Ship Co. (Toyo Kisen Kabushiki Kaisha) before being scrapped in 1926. She was filmed by Thomas Edison in 1897 in one of his early movies. The movie is currently stored in the Library of Congress.

== Ship history ==
A sister ship to SS Arabic, Coptic was built at the Harland & Wolff shipyard in Belfast, for service with the Oceanic Steam Navigation Company's White Star Line. Launched on 10 August 1881, she was delivered on 9 November 1881 and made her maiden voyage from Liverpool to New York on 16 November 1881 under the command of Captain Edward J. Smith, who later commanded RMS Titanic on her disastrous 1912 maiden voyage. On the return voyage, a hurricane stove in several of her lifeboats and drowned two seamen who were swept overboard. On 11 March 1882, she sailed from Liverpool to Hong Kong via the Suez Canal, chartered to the Occidental and Oriental Steamship Company for service between San Francisco, California, and China. As O&O already had numerous vessels on that run, she was briefly chartered by the New Zealand Shipping Company while the latter's own ships were under construction.

In 1884, Coptic was chartered by Shaw, Savill & Company for their Liverpool to New Zealand service, and was fitted with 750-ton-capacity refrigerated holds and the refrigerating machinery to transport New Zealand mutton. From 8 October 1884, a regular service was established; fares ranged from 70 guineas in first class to 16 in steerage.

Coptic departing from San Francisco in 1897

On 12 October 1889, Coptic struck a rock off Mai Island, Brazil. when on a voyage from Rio de Janeiro, Brazil to Plymouth, Devon. She was refloated and put back to Rio de Janeiro flooded at the bow. Following repairs, she resumed her voyage on 30 October. While under the command of Captain Smith – her master from 1889 to 1894 – she ran aground in December 1890 on Main Island at Rio de Janeiro, Brazil, while about to return to Plymouth. Her forward compartments flooded, but were repaired by local engineers. In late 1894, her compound engines were replaced with a Harland & Wolff triple expansion engine and new boilers; her accommodations were modernised and her funnel lengthened. In early 1895, she was chartered to the Occidental and Oriental Steamship Company again to serve between San Francisco, California, and the Far East. In August 1895, the ship carried Wong Kim Ark, a U.S.-born resident of San Francisco who was visiting family in Taishan, Guangdong. Upon returning home on the SS Coptic he was detained at the Port of San Francisco and denied entry into the country, leading to the landmark U.S. Supreme Court case United States v. Wong Kim Ark. In September 1897, she collided in Kobe harbour with Minatogawa Maru, which buckled several of her hull plates and twisted her stem. In February 1898 she suffered considerable damage after being caught in a typhoon. After temporary repairs at Yokohama, Japan, she sailed to Hong Kong, where several decks were removed and rebuilt.

On 5 June 1898, United States Navy Captain Charles V. Gridley, died of natural causes aboard Coptic while in Kobe, Japan. He had recently been relieved of command of the Asiatic Squadron flagship, the protected cruiser USS Olympia, following the American victory in the Battle of Manila Bay on 1 May 1898 during the Spanish–American War; the heat and stress of the battle had exacerbated an existing medical condition, and Gridley's health deteriorated quickly afterward. His body was brought home to the United States and buried in his home town of Erie, Pennsylvania.

On 12 September 1900, Coptic ran aground again, this time at Shimonoseki, Japan, but suffered no damage. She made her final voyage for Occidental and Oriental in 1906, departing San Francisco on 30 October. In December 1906, she was sold to the American Pacific Mail Steamship Company, and renamed Persia, but continued to serve between San Francisco and the Far East and retained British registry. After a 1911 refit, the elderly ship was sold again in 1915 to the Japanese Steam Ship Co. (Toyo Kisen Kabushiki Kaisha) of Yokohama, and renamed Persia Maru. She continued plying the trans-Pacific route through 1922, when she was transferred to the Tokyo–Netherlands East Indies route. She was laid up in Yokohama in December 1924 and her fittings were auctioned off. In 1926, the Japanese Steam Ship Co. merged with the Japan Mail Shipping Line (NYK), and after a 44-year career, Persia Maru was scrapped in Osaka, Japan, in 1926.
