= SS Belgic (1885) =

British Ship

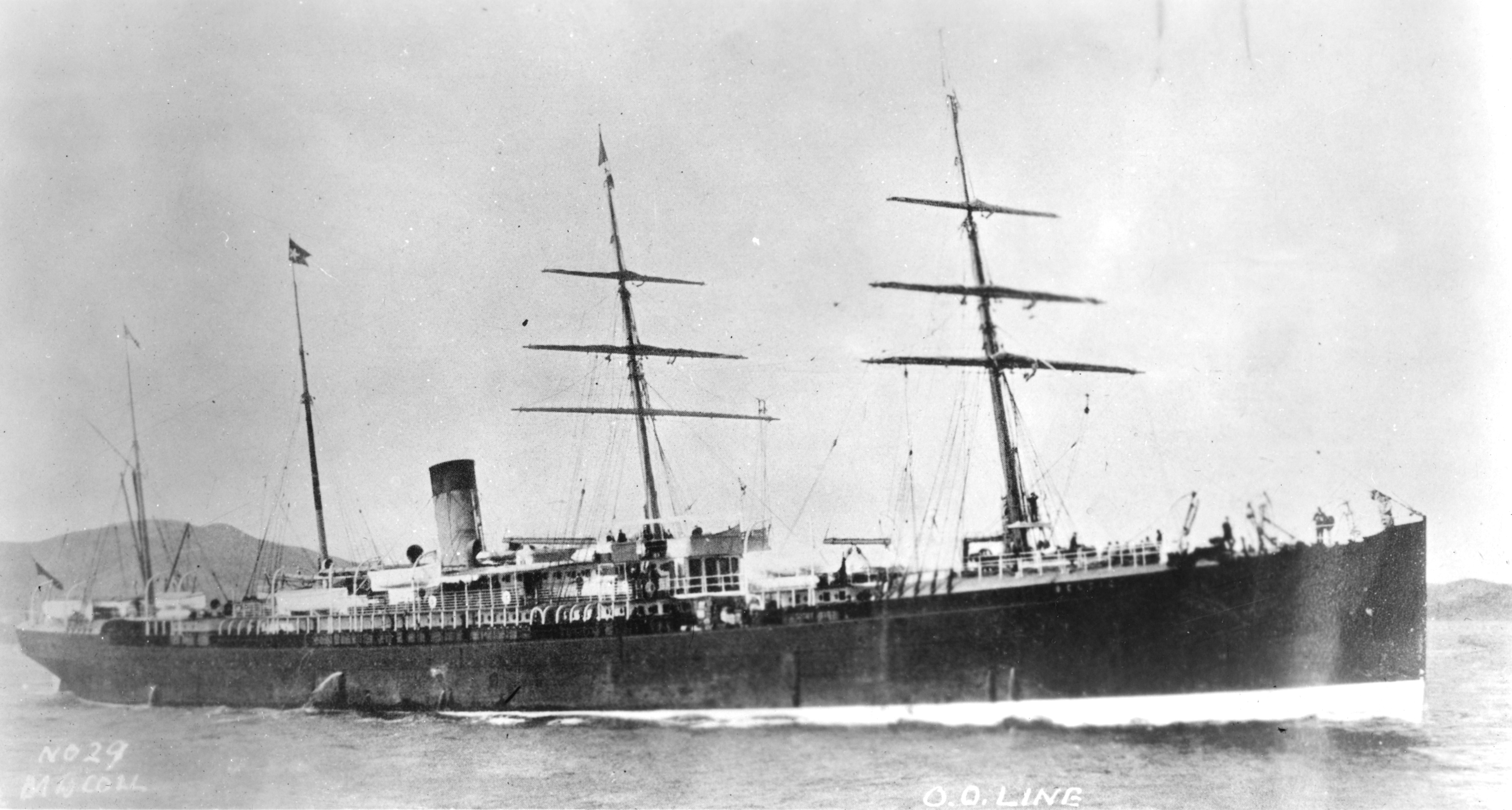
- SS Belgic

History

United Kingdom
- Name: Belgic (1885 – 1899); Mohawk (1899 – 1903)
- Owner: White Star Line; Atlantic Transport Line
- Operator: Occidental and Oriental Steamship Company; Atlantic Transport Line
- Port of registry: (United Kingdom) Liverpool
- Builder: Harland & Wolff
- Yard number: 171
- Laid down: 1884
- Launched: 3 January 1885
- Completed: 7 July 1885
- In service: 1885
- Out of service: 1903
- Identification: United Kingdom Official Number 91208
- Fate: Scrapped in Garston, Liverpool in 1903

General characteristics
- Type: Cargo liner
- Tonnage: 4,212 GRT
- Length: 420 ft 4 in (128.12 m)
- Beam: 45 ft 5 in (13.84 m)
- Depth: 29 ft 6 in (8.99 m)
- Decks: 3
- Installed power: 2 Compound steam engines of 2800 indicated horsepower
- Propulsion: Single propeller
- Sail plan: 4 masts; Square rigged on two masts
- Speed: 13 knots (24 km/h; 15 mph)

The SS Belgic was a steam ship built by Harland & Wolff for the White Star Line for service in the Far East and across the Pacific. Sold to the Atlantic Transport Line in 1899 she was transferred to the North Atlantic. After service as a Boer War transport she was scrapped at Garston, Liverpool in 1903.

== Construction ==
Belgic was a steel-hulled ship divided by watertight bulkheads into 8 separate compartments. In addition to her engines she had four masts with the first pair being square rigged. Her main propulsion was provided by two double cylindered engines of 400 NHP, also built by Messrs. Harland and Wolff, the steam for which was supplied from three coal-fired elliptical boilers, working at a pressure of 90 psi. In the event of one engine failing it could be disconnected from the propeller shaft enabling the vessel to continue at reduced power. She carried eight lifeboats as well as two life rafts.

The comfort of passengers on board was enhanced by the provision of electric light and a refrigerated compartment enabling fresh meat to be served on the voyage.

== History ==
Belgic was launched on 3 January 1885 and completed on 7 July the same year. On completion she was chartered to the Occidental and Oriental Steamship Company for service in the Far East and Pacific. As a positioning move her maiden voyage was utilised to take 590 emigrants to Australia, leaving London on 30 July, under the command of Captain William Henry Walker, and arriving in Sydney on 12 September. She then took up her intended services connecting Yokohama, San Francisco and Hong Kong.

On 26 May 1894 she was rammed by Blue Funnel's Ulysses while loading tea in Amoy Harbour. No damage was caused to either ship. A year later, on 9 May 1895, she went aground in Sateyama Bay, Japan but was refloated. In 1898 she returned to Britain.

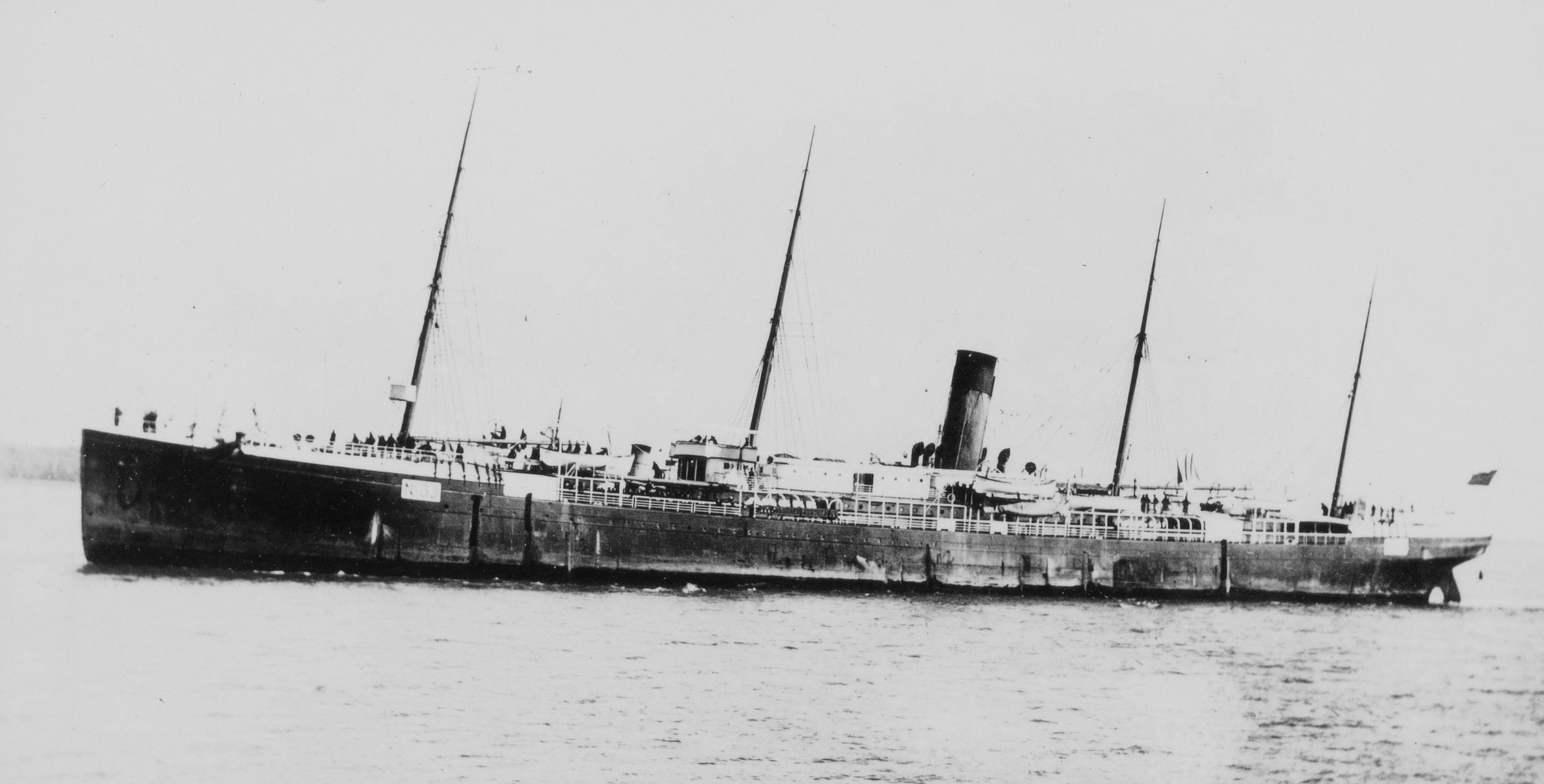
SS Mohawk former Belgic during the Boer War

In 1899 she was sold to the Atlantic Transport Line who renamed her Mohawk. After refitting she was then used on the North Atlantic, sailing between London and New York City from September 1900. In December 1900 Mohawk was requisitioned as a transport for Boer War service. She was returned to her owners in 1902 but the decision was taken not to refurbish her and she was scrapped by Garston at Liverpool in 1903.
