= SS Arabic (1881) =

1881–1890 steamship

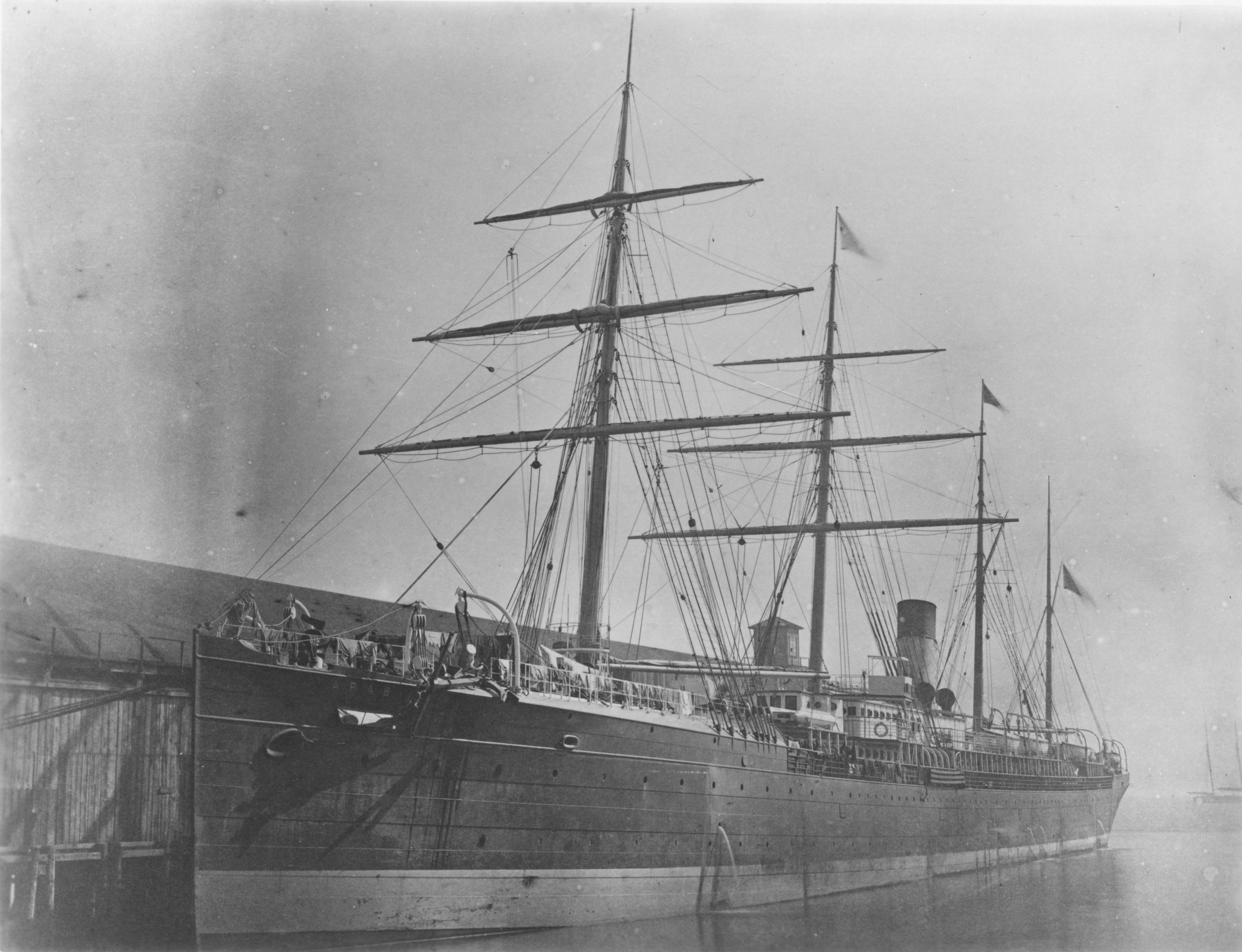
- SS Arabic

History

United Kingdom
- Name: SS Arabic
- Owner: White Star Line
- Operator: White Star; Occidental and Oriental Steamship Co.
- Port of registry: Liverpool
- Route: Liverpool-New York (1881; 12 May 1887 – 19 April 1888); San Francisco-Hong Kong (1882–1886; under charter); London-Melbourne-Sydney (via Cape Town) (1886; under charter); London-Queenstown-New York (30 March-12 May 1887)
- Builder: Harland & Wolff, Belfast; Engines by J. Jack and Co. of Liverpool
- Yard number: 141
- Launched: 30 April 1881
- Completed: 12 August 1881
- Acquired: 12 August 1881
- Maiden voyage: 10 September 1881
- Out of service: February 1890
- Fate: Sold to the Holland America Line in February 1890

Netherlands
- Name: SS Spaarndam
- Owner: Holland America Line
- Port of registry: Rotterdam
- Acquired: February 1890
- In service: 29 March 1890
- Out of service: 7 February 1901
- Fate: Broken up August 1901

General characteristics
- Class & type: Cargo/passenger freighter
- Tonnage: 4,368 gross register tons
- Length: 430.167 ft (131.115 m)
- Beam: 42.167 ft (12.853 m)
- Installed power: Sail; Compound-expansion steam reciprocating engine, producing 2,000 ihp
- Propulsion: Single propeller
- Sail plan: Four masts (rigged for sail)
- Speed: 13 kn (24 km/h; 15 mph)
- Capacity: 50 second-class
- Notes: Steel construction, single funnel

SS Arabic was a steamship of the White Star Line and its first steel-hulled vessel. Like her predecessors, she was built by shipbuilders Harland & Wolff of Belfast.

== History ==
Originally intended to be named Asiatic, she was the first steel-hulled vessel built for White Star. She was completed as the Arabic on 12 August 1881. Like her sister Coptic, she was designed as a combination cargo/passenger freighter; while able to accommodate both steerage and second-class passengers, she was primarily designed to carry cargo and livestock. She made her maiden voyage from Liverpool to New York on 10 September 1881, at the end of the normal trans-Atlantic crossing season. She made two more round voyages on this route, colliding with the SS Plove while departing the Mersey for the last crossing. On 4 February 1882, she began her service under charter to the Occidental and Oriental Steamship Company for their San Francisco-Hong Kong route, departing Liverpool for Hong Kong via the Suez Canal, after which she sailed to San Francisco to begin her trans-Pacific service.

On 2 June 1884, she arrived in Hong Kong via Yokohama with a damaged propeller, which necessitated her being dry-docked before returning to San Francisco. She returned to the UK in 1886 and made one Australian voyage for Occidental & Oriental (London-Melbourne-Sydney, via Cape Town) on 26 October of that year. She completed her charter upon returning to London early in 1887, after which she sailed to Belfast to have 50 second-class ("intermediate-class") berths installed. She returned to White Star service on the London-Queenstown-New York route from 30 March 1887, resuming the Liverpool-New York run on 12 May and making her final voyage on this run after departing Liverpool on 19 April 1888. In May, she resumed her charter for Occidental & Oriental.

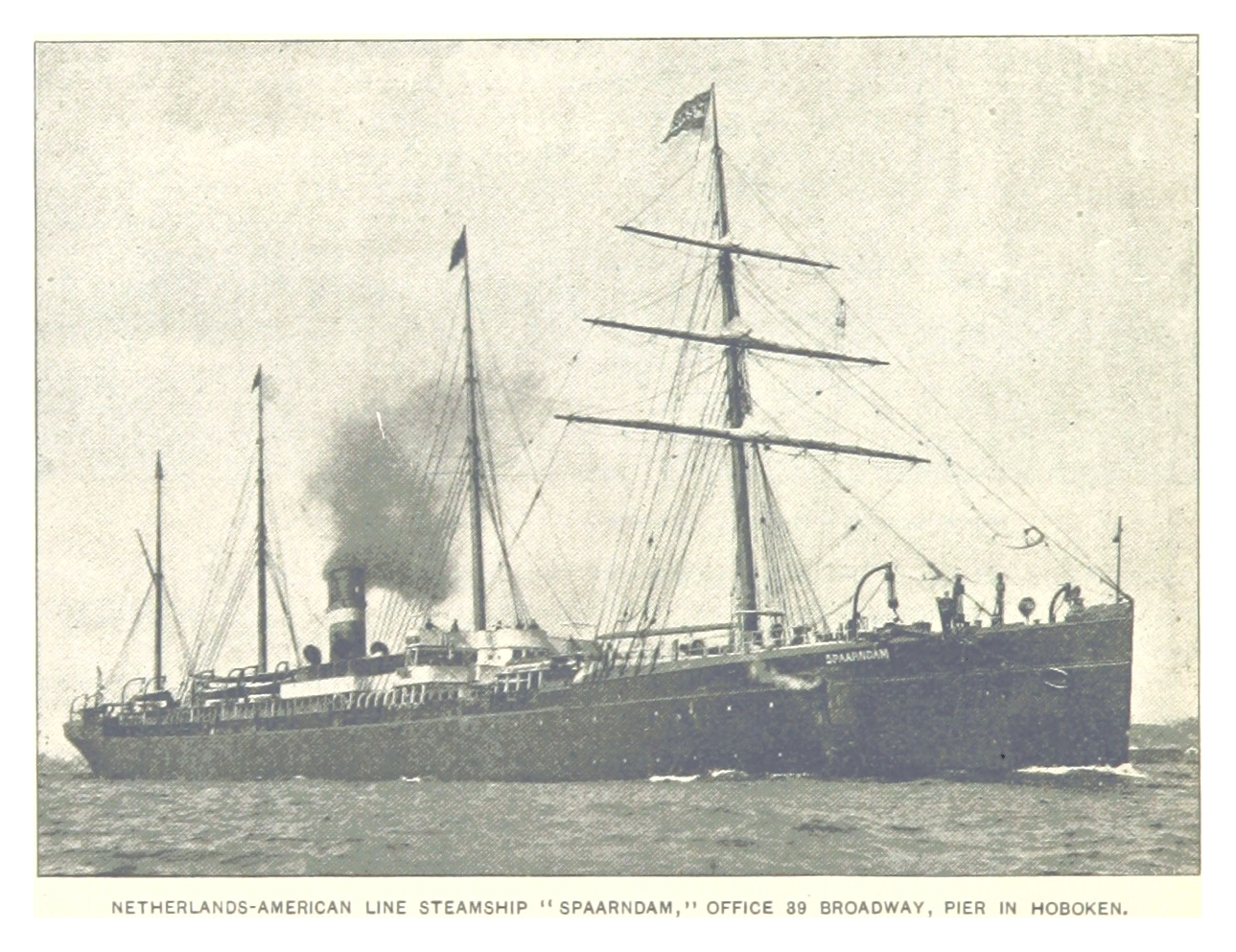
The ship in service as SS Spaarndam

In February 1890, Arabic was sold to the Holland America Line for £65,000 and renamed SS Spaarndam. On 29 March, she made her first voyage under the Dutch flag from Rotterdam to New York. After 11 years of service, she made her final voyage on 7 February 1901. In August, she was sold to Thomas Ward ship breakers and broken up at Preston.
