= HMAT =

There are two meanings of HMAT:

In UK Royal Navy use, HMAT is "His/Her Majesty's Armed Transport" and may refer to HMAT Supply among others.

In Royal Australian Navy use, HMAT is "His/Her Majesty's Australian Transport" and may refer to the following Australian troopships:

- HMAT Afric
- HMAT Ascanius
- HMAT Bulla
- HMAT Euripides
- HMAT Medic
- HMAT Orontes
- HMAT Persic
- HMAT Runic
- HMAT Shropshire
- HMAT Suevic
- HMAT Wandilla
- HMAT Warilda
