= Suevic =

Suevic may refer to:

- Suebi or Suevi, a large group of Germanic peoples
- Suebian, the language of the Suebi
- SS Suevic, a steamship
