= Afric =

Afric may refer to:

- Afric Simone, born 1956, a musician and entertainer from Mozambique
- SS Afric, a ship of the White Star Line launched in 1898, and sunk in 1917
