= Jubilee-class ocean liner =

Ocean liners built in Belfast, 1898–1900

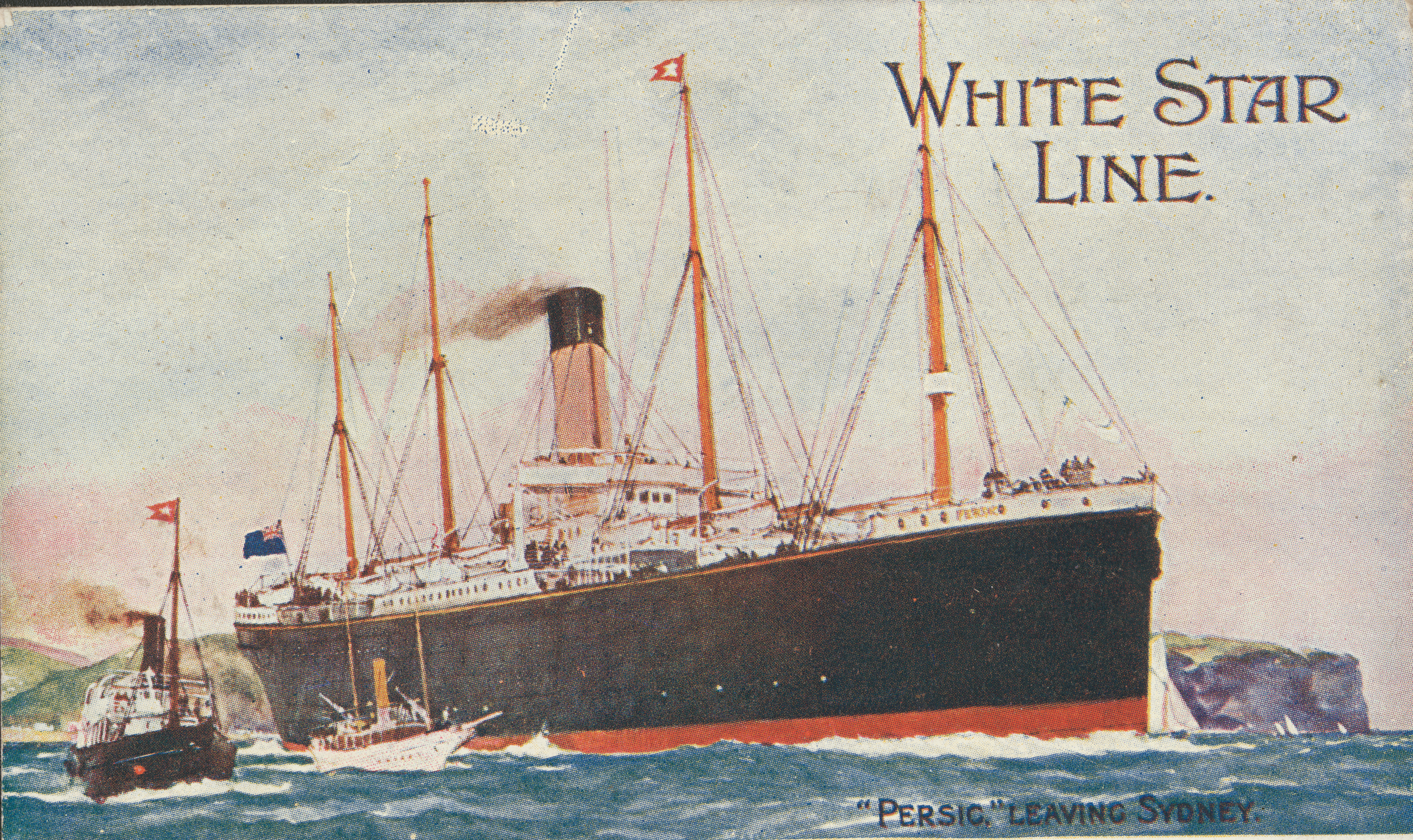
- SS Persic

Class overview
- Name: Jubilee class
- Builders: Harland and Wolff
- Operators: White Star Line
- Preceded by: Naronic class
- Succeeded by: RMS Oceanic; "Big Four"
- Built: 1898–1900
- In service: 1899–1942
- Planned: 5
- Completed: 5
- Lost: 4
- Retired: 1

General characteristics
- Type: Ocean liner/cargo liner
- Tonnage: 11,948 – 12,531 GRT
- Length: 550-565 ft (167-172m)
- Beam: 63 ft 4 in (19.30 m)
- Decks: 3
- Installed power: 5,000 ihp (3,728 kW)
- Propulsion: Two four-cylinder quadruple-expansion steam engines
- Speed: 14 knots (26 km/h; 16 mph) service speed
- Range: Approx 12,000 nm at 12kn
- Boats & landing craft carried: Approx 14 lifeboats
- Capacity: 320–400 passengers; 15,000 deadweight tons of cargo capacity
- Crew: Approx 141

The Jubilee class were a group of five passenger and cargo ocean liners built by Harland and Wolff at Belfast, for the White Star Line, specifically for the White Star Line's service from the UK to Australia on the Liverpool–Cape Town–Sydney route. The five ships in order of the dates they entered service were:

- SS Afric (1899)
- SS Medic (1899)
- SS Persic (1899)
- SS Runic (1901)
- SS Suevic (1901)

== Background ==
The White Star Line had originally been based on the Australian trade. Thomas Ismay had purchased the houseflag of the Pilkington and Wilson's White Star Line which had prospered during the Australian gold rushes of the 1850s. In the late 1890s the company decided to restart an Australian service, and ordered five new steamships for the new service, these were referred to as the "Jubilee class" as their commissioning coincided with the Diamond Jubilee of Queen Victoria.

The ships were built in two groups, with the first three ships of the class (Afric, Medic and Persic) entering service in 1899, and the last two (Runic and Suevic) entering service two years later. The five ships enabled White Star to run their planned monthly "Colonial service" to Australia.

== Features ==
The Jubilee-class ships were built for a dual role of carrying both passengers and cargo, and were at the time, the largest ships ever made for the Australia service. The first three had a gross register tonnage of slightly below 12,000 tons, and a capacity for 320 passengers. The passenger service proved more popular than White Star had expected, and so the last two ships of the class incorporated some design changes, giving them a slightly higher tonnage of around 12,500 tons, and an enlarged capacity of 400 passengers. The most notable design changes were the extension of the poop deck and the moving of the bridge closer to the bow. All of the ships had three continuous decks, with the passenger accommodation located mostly aft of amidships.

The passenger accommodation was built with the immigrant and settler trade in mind, and only a single class of accommodation was provided; this was described as third-class, but was of higher quality than most third-class accommodation for ships of the period, and ranged in scale from two or four berth cabins, to open berth dormitories as the cheapest option. Passenger facilities included a dining saloon, a library and a smoking room: These facilities were considered luxurious, and were not at the time normally included in third-class accommodation. One of the advantages of having a single class of accommodation was that passengers could have a free run of every part of the ship except the bridge, instead of being confined to the part of the ship reserved for one particular class.

As well as passenger accommodation, all of the Jubilee class also had a substantial 15,000 deadweight tons of cargo capacity, in seven cargo holds, most of which were refrigerated using a carbonic anhydride system: These were intended principally for the transport of Australian meat, with the capacity for 100,000 frozen carcasses of mutton in 240,000 sq ft (22,000 m^{2}) of refrigerated space. Each ship also had one cargo hold which was specially designed for the transport of up to 20,000 bales of wool. The cargo holds were served by twenty-five derricks.

The ships all had a single funnel and four masts with schooner rigging; plans had apparently been drawn up in the design stage for the ships to be equipped with sails, but this idea was abandoned. They were powered by two quadruple-expansion steam engines through two propellers, with a service speed of around 14 knots (26 km/h; 16 mph).

== Careers ==
=== Afric ===
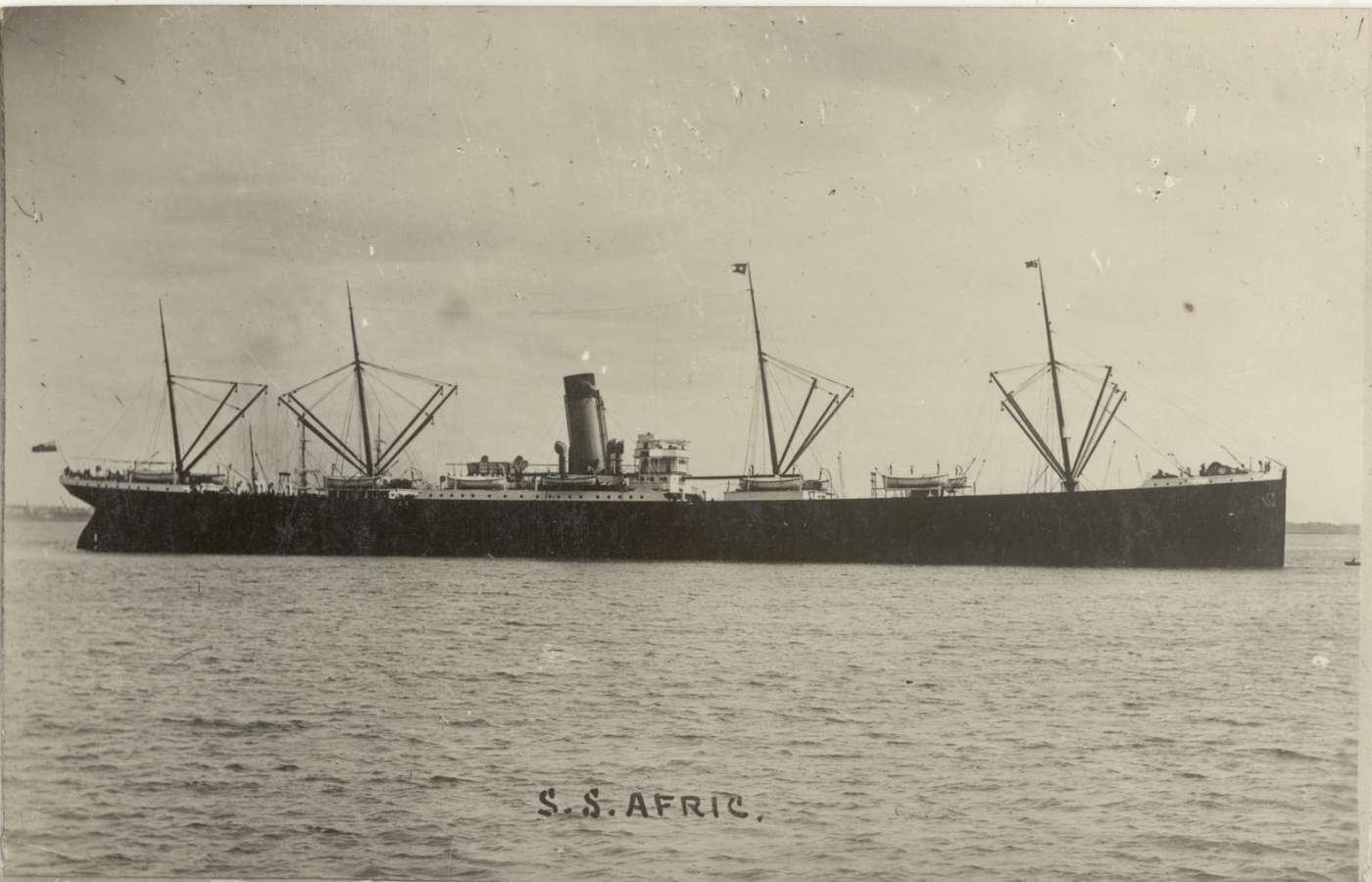
SS Afric

Afric was the first of the five ships to be launched, although not the first to sail to Australia, She was launched on 16 November 1898, making her maiden voyage on 8 February the following year from Liverpool to New York as a test run, after further work she entered service on the Australia service on 9 September. Afric and her sisters carried troops and horses during the Boer War (1900–1902), which often interfered with their schedule, it would not be until the war concluded in 1902 that White Star was able to put their planned regular monthly service into effect. After twelve years of uneventful peacetime service, Afric was requisitioned for use as a troopship by the Australian government in 1914 on the outbreak of World War I. She was sunk by a German U-boat on 2 February 1917 in the English Channel with the loss of 22 lives, making her the shortest lived member of the class.

=== Medic ===
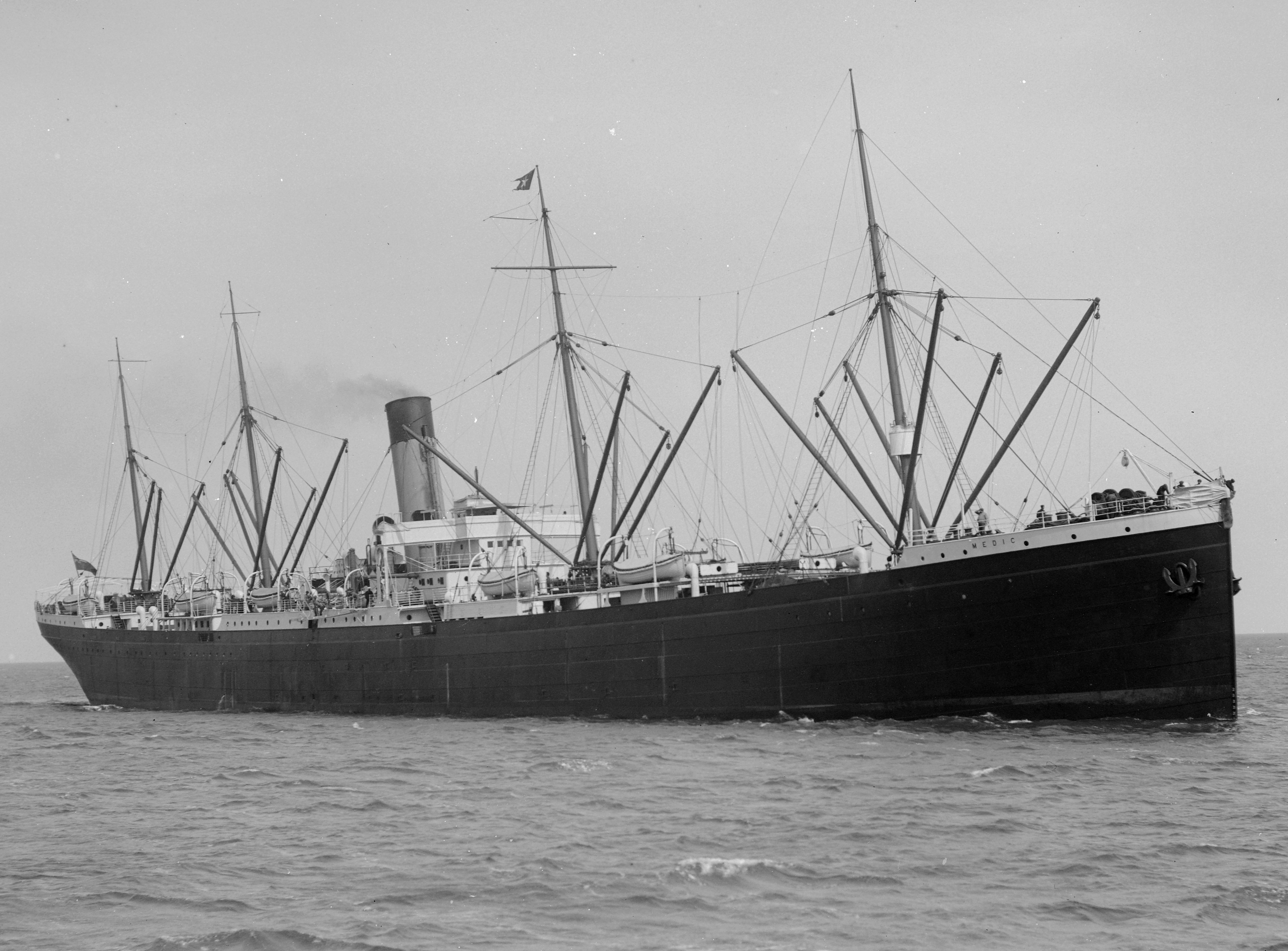
SS Medic

Medic was launched on 15 December 1898, and inaugurated the Australia service with her maiden voyage which started from Liverpool on 3 August 1899, on her return voyage she carried Australian troops and horses to the Boer War which had started in October. She initially remained in commercial service after the outbreak of World War I, but was requisitioned under the Liner Requisition Scheme from 1917 to 1919, after which she returned to commercial service on the Australian route, until December 1927. In 1928 Medic was sold to A/S Hektor (N.Bugge) of Norway who renamed her Hektoria and converted her into a whaling factory ship. In 1932 Hektoria returned to the British register after her ownership was transferred to Hektoria Ltd. Hektoria was requisitioned for use as an oil tanker on the outbreak of World War II, but sunk by a U-boat on 11 September 1942 whilst sailing in an Atlantic convoy.

=== Persic ===
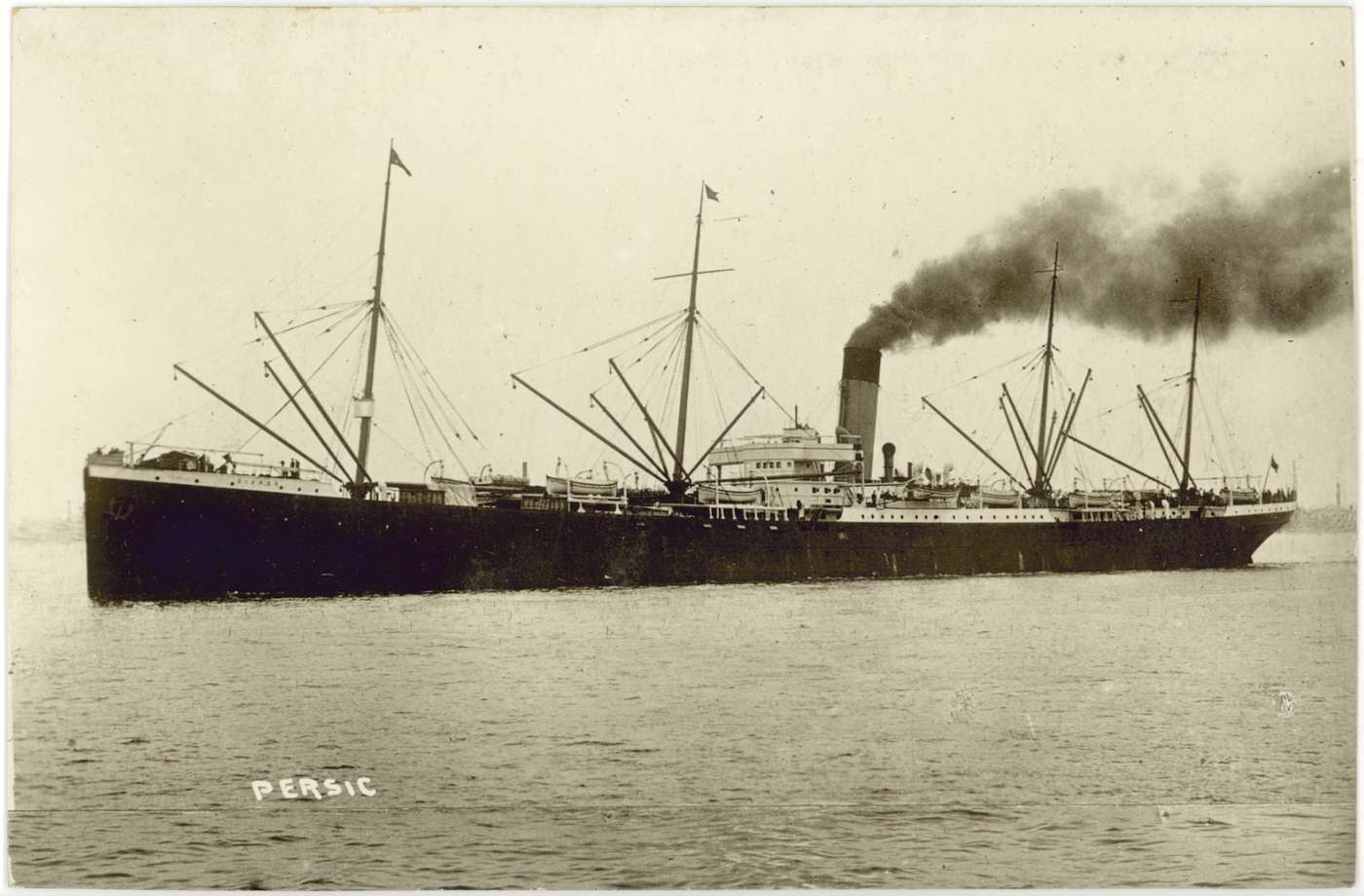
SS Persic

Persic was launched on 7 September 1899, and started her maiden voyage on 7 December carrying 500 troops for the Boer War. During the maiden voyage her rudder stock broke, and Persic had to remain at Cape Town until a replacement could be shipped out from Belfast and fitted. When the voyage resumed early the next year Persic carried home injured Australian troops. In October 1900 Persic rescued the crew of the ship Madura which had caught fire. Persic remained in commercial service until she was requisitioned under the Liner Requisition Scheme in 1917, and used as a troopship. On 12 September 1918 while carrying American soldiers Persic was torpedoed off the Isles of Scilly, but remained afloat and was able to reach port for repairs. She was released into commercial service and refitted in 1920, but was withdrawn from service in 1926 after her engines were found to be suffering from advanced wear, and were beyond economic repair. The following year she was sold for scrap, and in July 1927 she sailed for her last voyage to a shipbreakers in the Netherlands.

=== Runic ===
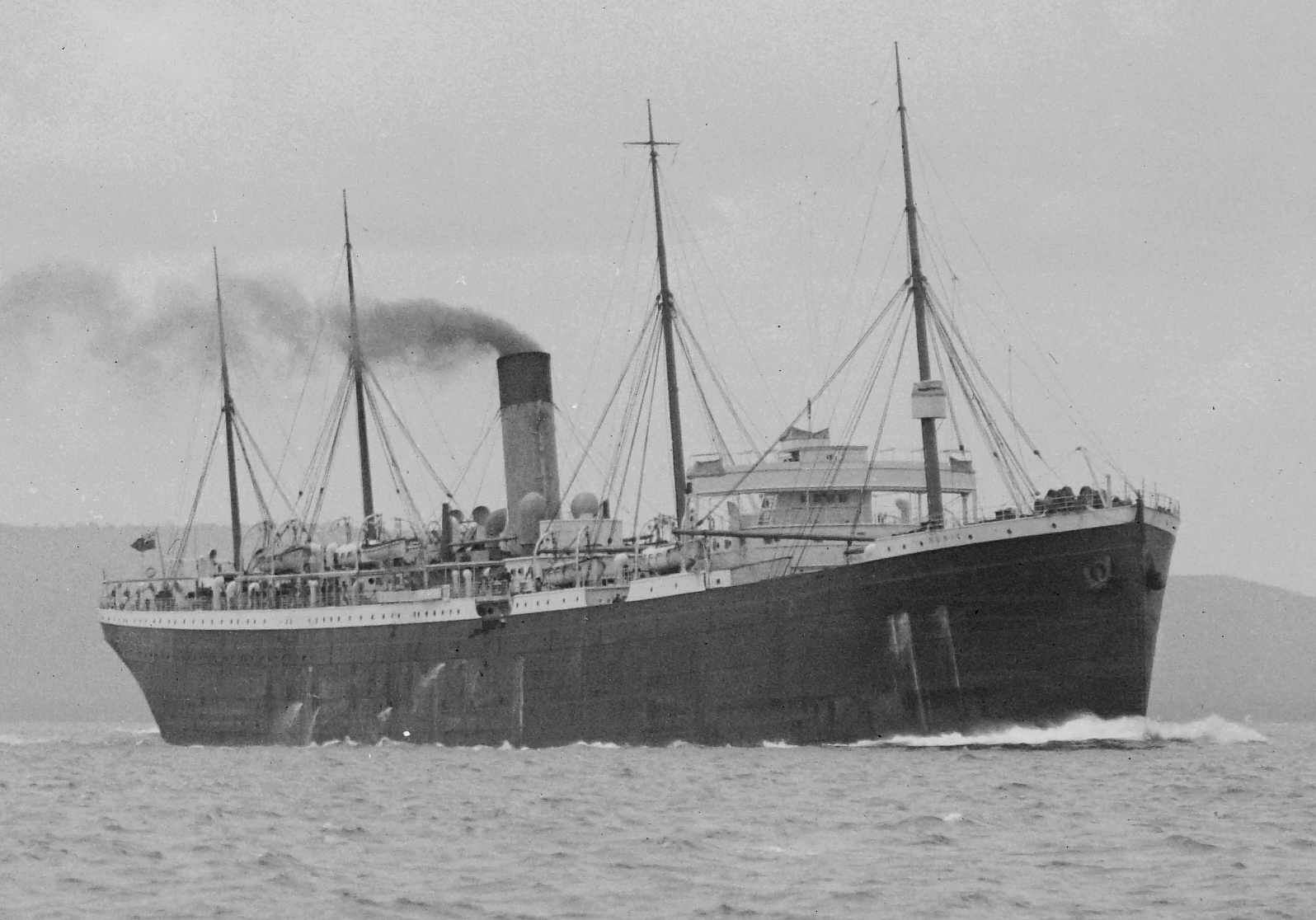
SS Runic

Runic was launched on 25 October 1900, and entered service with her maiden voyage on 19 January 1901, on 25 November that year she towed the liner Dunottar Castle which had broken down to the port of Dakar. Runic was commissioned by the Australian government as a war transport in January 1915, and on 1 May that year she collided with and sunk the collier Horst Martini in fog whilst in the English Channel, but there were no deaths. Between 1917 and 1919 she served with her sisters under the Liner Requisition Scheme, before being returned to commercial service and refitted in 1921. Runic made her last voyage to Australia in December 1929. In July 1930 she was sold to the Sevilla Whaling Co of London who converted her into a whaling factory ship and renamed her New Sevilla, the following year she was sold to Christian Salvesen. On 20 September 1940 New Sevilla was sailing in a convoy from Liverpool to Antarctica when she was torpedoed off the coast of Ireland, she sank the next day with the loss of two lives.

=== Suevic ===
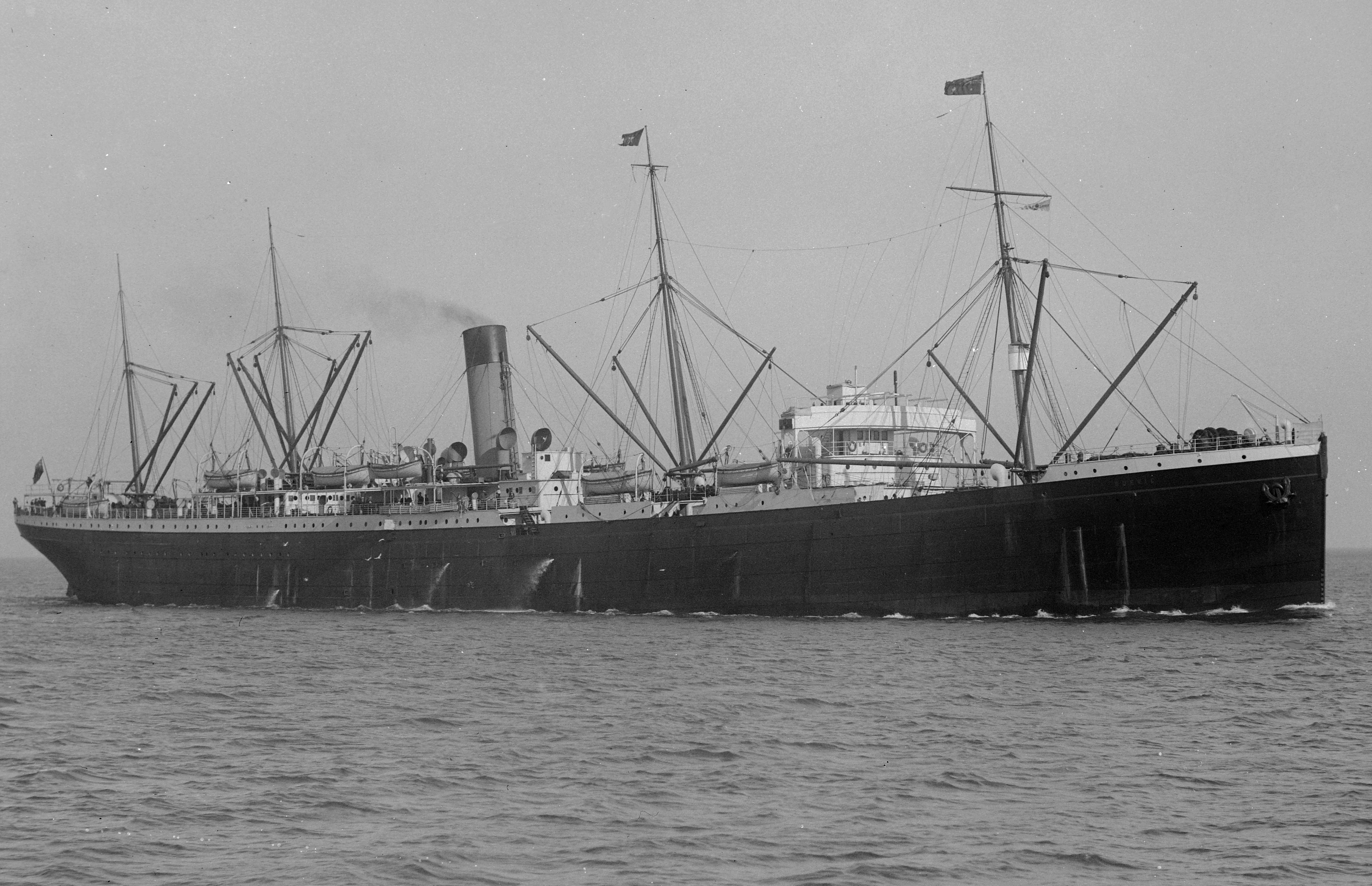
SS Suevic

Suevic was launched on 8 December 1900, and made her maiden voyage on 23 March the following year. At 12,531 GRT, Suevic was fractionally the largest of the Class. Like her sisters, during her early career she carried British troops to the Boer War on the outbound journeys to Cape Town, and Australian troops on the inbound journeys. After an uneventful early career, on 17 March 1907, Suevic ran aground on rocks near Lizard Point, Cornwall due to a navigational error which led to her position being miscalculated. After the passengers, crew and cargo were taken off the ship, unsuccessful efforts were made to free the vessel by reversing her engines. As only the bow was stuck on the rocks, and the stern section was undamaged, an unusual salvage operation was decided on, which involved splitting the ship in two with explosive charges, and constructing a new bow which would then be joined to the freed stern. On 2 April Suevic was successfully divided with dynamite, and the freed stern section was made seaworthy and then towed to Southampton, with the original bow left on the rocks. A new bow section was constructed at Belfast, and was then towed to Southampton, where it was joined to the original stern. Suevic then returned to her normal service on 14 January 1908. She initially remained in commercial service following the outbreak of World War I in 1914, but was taken up as an Australian troopship in May 1915, and made one dedicated trooping journey to the Gallipoli Campaign. She was taken up by the British government under the Liner Requisition Scheme between 1917 and 1920, after which she was refitted and returned to commercial service on the Australian service with her remaining sisters. In 1928 she was sold to Yngvar Hvistendahl's Finnhval A/S of Norway, and like her sisters Medic and Runic was converted into a whale factory ship and renamed Skytteren. When Norway was invaded by Nazi Germany in 1940, Skytteren was left stranded at the Port of Gothenburg in neutral Sweden. On 1 April 1942 Skytteren and nine other Norwegian ships made an attempt to reach international waters, where they would be guided by the Allies to the UK, the operation was a disaster as the Germans were tipped off; six of the ships were scuttled or sunk by the Germans, and two returned to Sweden, only two of the ships made it, Skytteren was not one of them; she was scuttled by her crew to avoid being captured by the Germans off the Swedish coast, and her crew taken as prisoners of war.
