= MV Storsten =

Norwegian Tanker Built in 1926

History

Norway
- Name: Storsten
- Operator: Rafen & Loennechen/ Nortraship
- Port of registry: (Norway) Tønsberg
- Builder: Barclay, Curle & Co Ltd., Glasgow
- Launched: 12 May 1926
- Fate: Sunk by German aircraft in Skagerrak on 1 April 1942 during Operation Performance

General characteristics
- Type: Tanker
- Tonnage: 8,000 DWT

MV Storsten was a Norwegian tanker built in 1926, and sunk by German aircraft in the Skagerrak on 1 April 1942.

== Construction ==
The ship was built by Barclay, Curle & Co Ltd. in Glasgow in 1926. She had a tonnage of 8,000 dwt.

== Second World War ==
The ship was among the Kvarstad vessels which were held in arrest in Gothenburg during the German occupation of Norway from 1940. During the British led Operation Performance commanded by Sir George Binney, an attempt to bring ten ships with cargo to Great Britain, Storsten was sunk by German aircraft in the Skagerrak, off Kristiansand. The ship had a British flag captain and 48 Norwegian crew and passengers. One of the lifeboats, with 17 of the crew, disappeared. The other lifeboats landed outside Rekefjord. Nine of the crew managed to escape, and eight of these eventually returned to Sweden. The other 23 were captured by German forces. Of these, two female passengers were subsequently released. The British flag captain was held in Marlag und Milag Nord, while the Norwegian crew eventually ended up as Nacht und Nebel (NN) prisoners in various German prisons.

Several of the prisoners perished as NN prisoners in Germany. These included boatswain Hans Fjelly, who died in Sonnenburg in January 1944, Asbjørn Amundal died in February 1944, Karl Anker Nygaard in August 1944, and Trygve Fredriksen in September 1944, all in Sonnenburg. Rolf Høiberget died in the Bergen-Belsen concentration camp in March 1945.
