= MV B. P. Newton =

Norwegian tanker from 1940

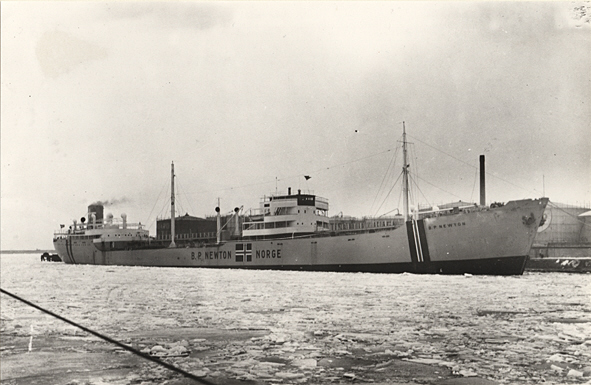

History

Norway
- Name: B. P. Newton
- Owner: Skibs-A/S Navalis
- Operator: Tschudi & Eitzen/ Nortraship
- Port of registry: (Norway) Oslo
- Builder: Kockums Mekaniska Verkstads AB in Malmö, Sweden
- Yard number: 214
- Launched: 13 January 1940
- Maiden voyage: 31 March 1942
- Identification: Code letters: BPLG; LKLV
- Fate: Sunk off Paramaribo on 7/8 July 1943

General characteristics
- Type: Tanker
- Tonnage: 10,200 DWT 10,324 GRT
- Length: 512.3 ft (156.1 m)
- Beam: 63.2 ft (19.3 m)
- Draught: 39 ft (12 m)
- Propulsion: 1 MAN 8-cylinder and 2-stroke diesel engine
- Speed: 14.5 knots (26.9 km/h; 16.7 mph)

MV B. P. Newton was a Norwegian tanker built in 1940, and sunk by a German submarine off South America in July 1943.

== Construction ==
The ship was built by Kockums Mekaniska Verkstads AB at Malmö in 1940. She had a tonnage of 10,200 tons deadweight (DWT).

== Second World War ==
The ship was among the Kvarstad vessels which were held in arrest in Gothenburg during the German occupation of Norway from 1940. The ship's maiden voyage was with Operation Performance, an attempt by the British to release a number of Norwegian merchant ships then interned in the neutral Swedish port of Gothenburg, starting on 31 March 1942. B. P. Newton was one of the two ships that managed to escape to Britain.

In 1942 and 1943 the ship sailed on the Atlantic Ocean between Great Britain and America.

=== Sinking, and fate of crew ===
B. P. Newton departed from Trinidad on 3 July 1943, sailing with the convoy TJ 1. During the night between 7 and 8 July the ship was hit by a torpedo from U-510. The ship, loaded with gasoline, was set on fire. 24 of the crew members were rescued, while 23 perished.
