= SS Persic =

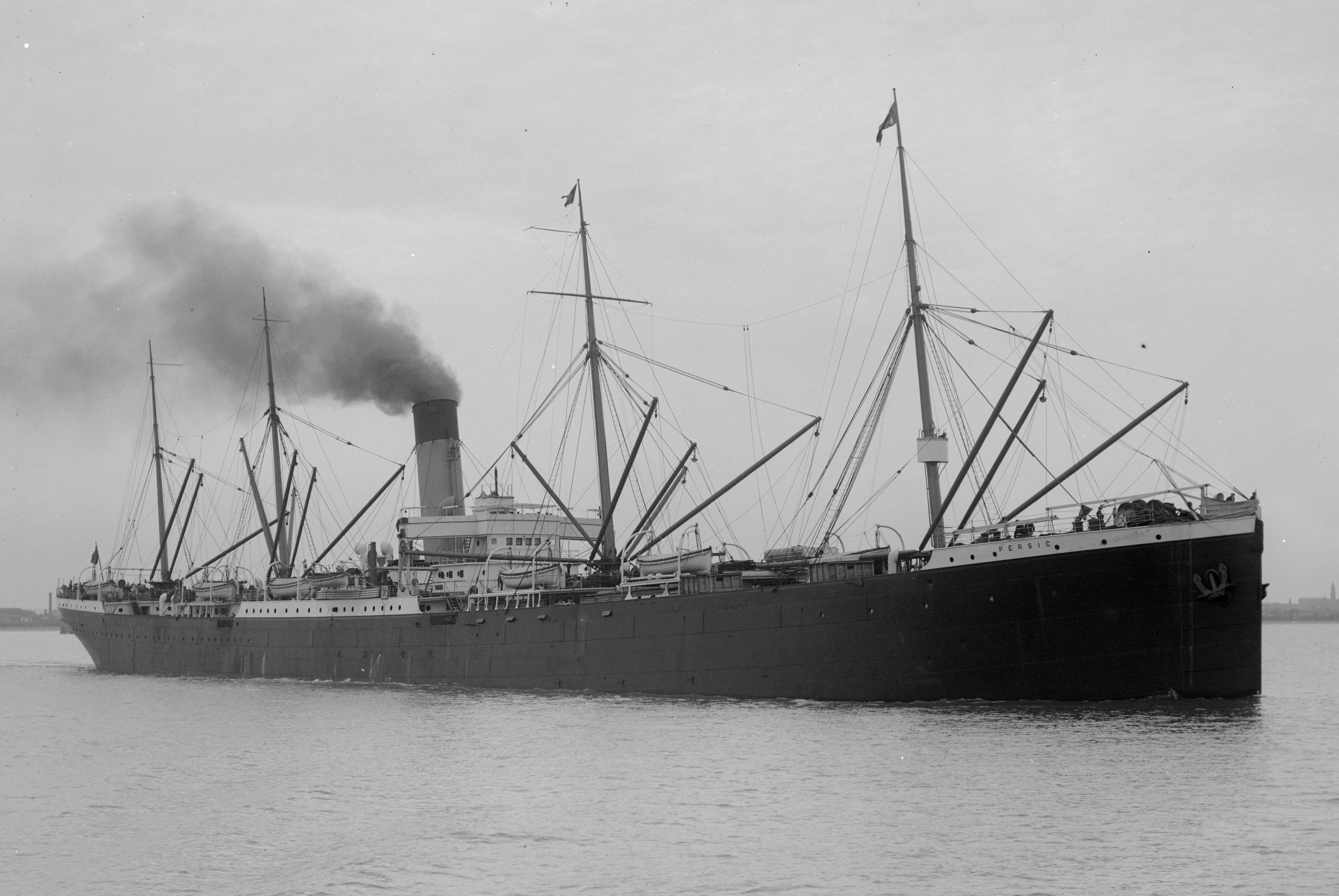
- SS Persic

History

United Kingdom
- Name: SS Persic
- Owner: White Star Line
- Port of registry: Liverpool
- Builder: Harland & Wolff, Belfast
- Yard number: 325
- Launched: 7 September 1899
- Completed: 16 November 1899
- In service: December 1899
- Out of service: September 1926
- Identification: Official number: 110620; Call sign: BKGS
- Fate: Sold for scrapping, July 1927

General characteristics
- Class & type: Jubilee-class passenger-cargo ship
- Tonnage: 11,973 GRT
- Length: 550 ft 2 in (167.69 m)
- Beam: 63 ft 3 in (19.28 m)
- Propulsion: 2 × 4-cylinder quadruple expansion steam engines, 2 shafts
- Speed: 14 knots (26 km/h; 16 mph)
- Capacity: 320 passengers; 100,000 refrigerated carcasses

SS Persic was an ocean liner of the White Star Line, built by Harland and Wolff in 1899. She was one of the five Jubilee-class ships (the others being the Afric, Medic, Suevic and Runic) built specifically to service the Liverpool–Cape Town–Sydney route. The voyage took six weeks.

Persic was the third Jubilee-class ship to be built for the Australia service, and was launched at Belfast on 7 September 1899, entering service on 7 December that year. Persic, like her sisters was a single-funnel liner, which had capacity for 320 third class passengers, and also had substantial cargo capacity with seven cargo holds, most of them refrigerated for the transport of Australian meat.

== Early career ==
Persic set out on her maiden voyage on 7 December 1899, as the Boer War was underway by this time, she carried 500 troops for South Africa. The maiden voyage turned out to be a fiasco as the ship developed a major fault: cracks developed on her rudder stock casting, which resulted in it breaking by the time she reached Cape Town. Persic had to remain at Cape Town until a replacement could be shipped out from Belfast and fitted. When the voyage resumed early the next year, Persic repatriated injured and sick Australian troops.

On 26 October 1900 the England-bound Persic travelling along the equator assisted the crew of the Glasgow steamer Maudra, which had caught on fire. Although extinguished the day before, it was found to be more serious, and the Maudra was abandoned. Part of the September–November journey, Australian artists Hugh Ramsay and George Washington Lambert travelled on the Persic from Sydney to London. Lambert became successful in London; Ramsay preferred Paris but had to return to Australia when his health failed.

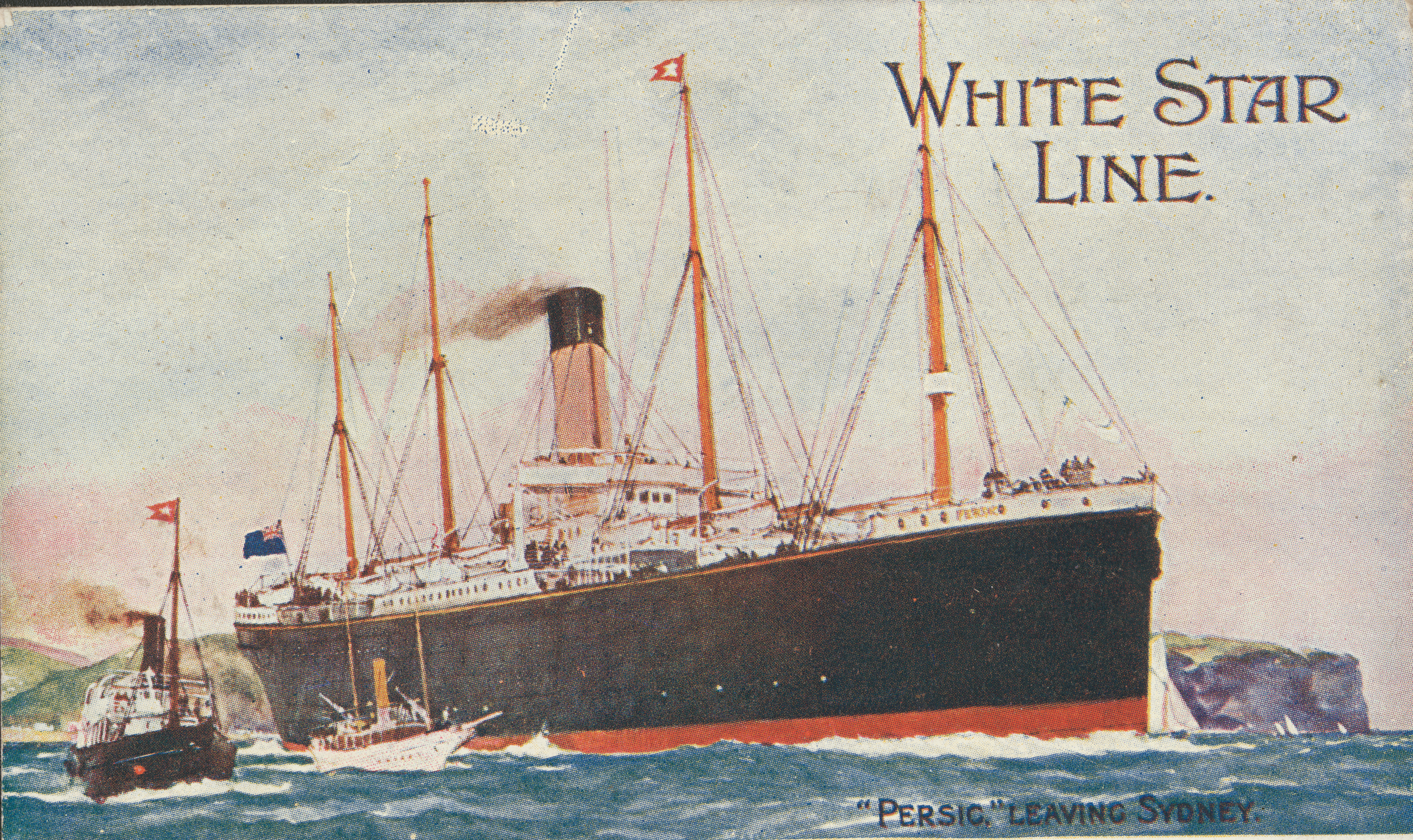
Persic in an old postcard

During 1901, the Persic made at least three return journeys between England and Australia. In February 1901 the vessel transported 'one of Australia's greatest and most loved poets' and bush balladeers, Will H. Ogilvie from Sydney, where he returned to Scotland. Artist G. W. Lambert who travelled the year before on the Persic also served as an illustrator in Ogilvie's 1898 work Fair girls and gray horses.

In July 1901 described as a large steamer, the Persic went from Liverpool, to Cape Town, via Adelaide and Melbourne to reach Sydney. The return journey saw her loaded with 1,200 tons of wheat (bound for England) as large general cargo.

Her November 1901 journey from Liverpool via Cape Town saw a passenger manifest of 335 passengers being 15 bound for Adelaide, 113 for Melbourne, and 207 for Sydney. On board were invalided and time-expired Australian and New Zealand soldiers from the Boer War. Additional to over two-hundred passengers on her return journey leaving Australia for England also saw her well-laden with cargo:

She carries a very large and varied cargo, comprising amongst other lines 10,200 bales wool, 300 tons coconut oil, 160 casks tallow, 1467 ingots tin, 140 tons chrome ore, 120 bales sheepskins, 30 bales furskins, 16,130 carcasses of mutton and lamb, and 1200 boxes butter.

The Persic continued her return trips services through the 1900s and 1910s. Mid-1910 saw the ship fitted with wireless telegraphy.

== World War I service ==
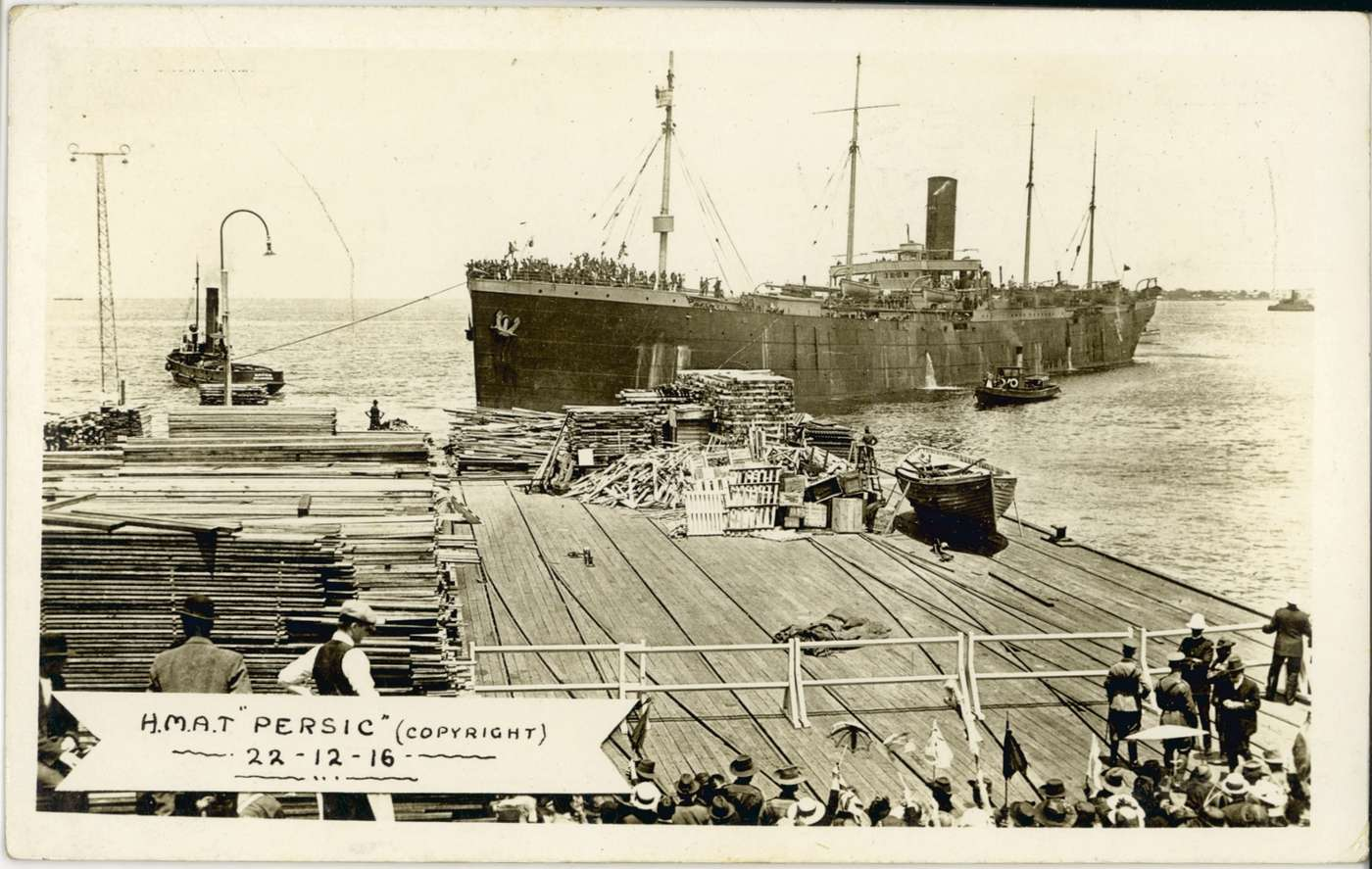
Persic in wartime service in 1916

The vessel was taken up by the Australian government as a war transport on the outbreak of World War I in 1914, becoming known by the designation HMAT (His Majesty's Australian Transport) A34, until 9 November 1917, when Persic was commandeered under the British government's Liner Requisition Scheme. In mid-1918 sailing from Canada as part of an escort going to England, zig-zagging whilst trying to avoid a torpedo, the Persic ran into her sister ship the Runic with no serious damage.

On 12 September 1918, Persic was sailing in a convoy carrying 2,800 American troops when she was torpedoed by the German U-boat SM UB-87 near the Isles of Scilly. Despite substantial damage she stayed afloat, and limped back to port under her own power where she was beached, and all on board survived.

== Final years ==
In July 1919, Persic was returned to commercial service, and the following year underwent a refit to overhaul and modernise her accommodation, which was changed to carry 260 passengers in Second class. She continued to ship Australian cargo, including landing in Hobart, Tasmania for 47 000 cases of fruit for London.

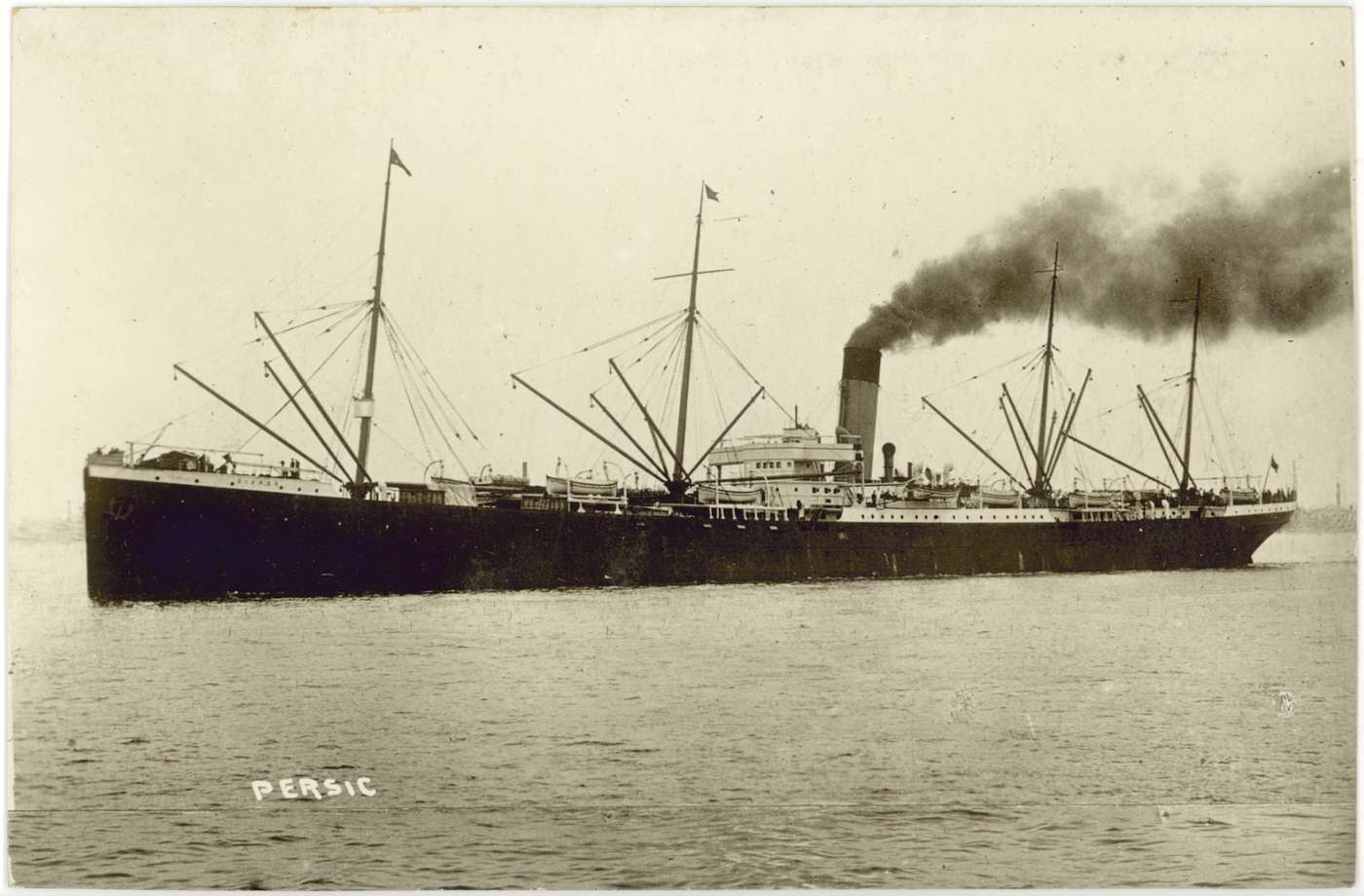
SS Persic at sea

In 1926, she went for another refit at Harland and Wolff's Govan yard, where her engines were found to suffering from advanced wear and tear with limited service life; as replacing them would not have been financially justifiable due to the ship's age, the decision was made to withdraw her from service. In September 1926 she made one last voyage to Australia, and upon her return she was laid up on the River Mersey. In June 1927 she was sold for scrap for £25,000 to the Dutch shipbreakers Hendrik Ido Ambacht, and on 7 July she left Liverpool for the Netherlands to be scrapped after 27 years of service.
