= SS Runic (1900) =

Steam ship

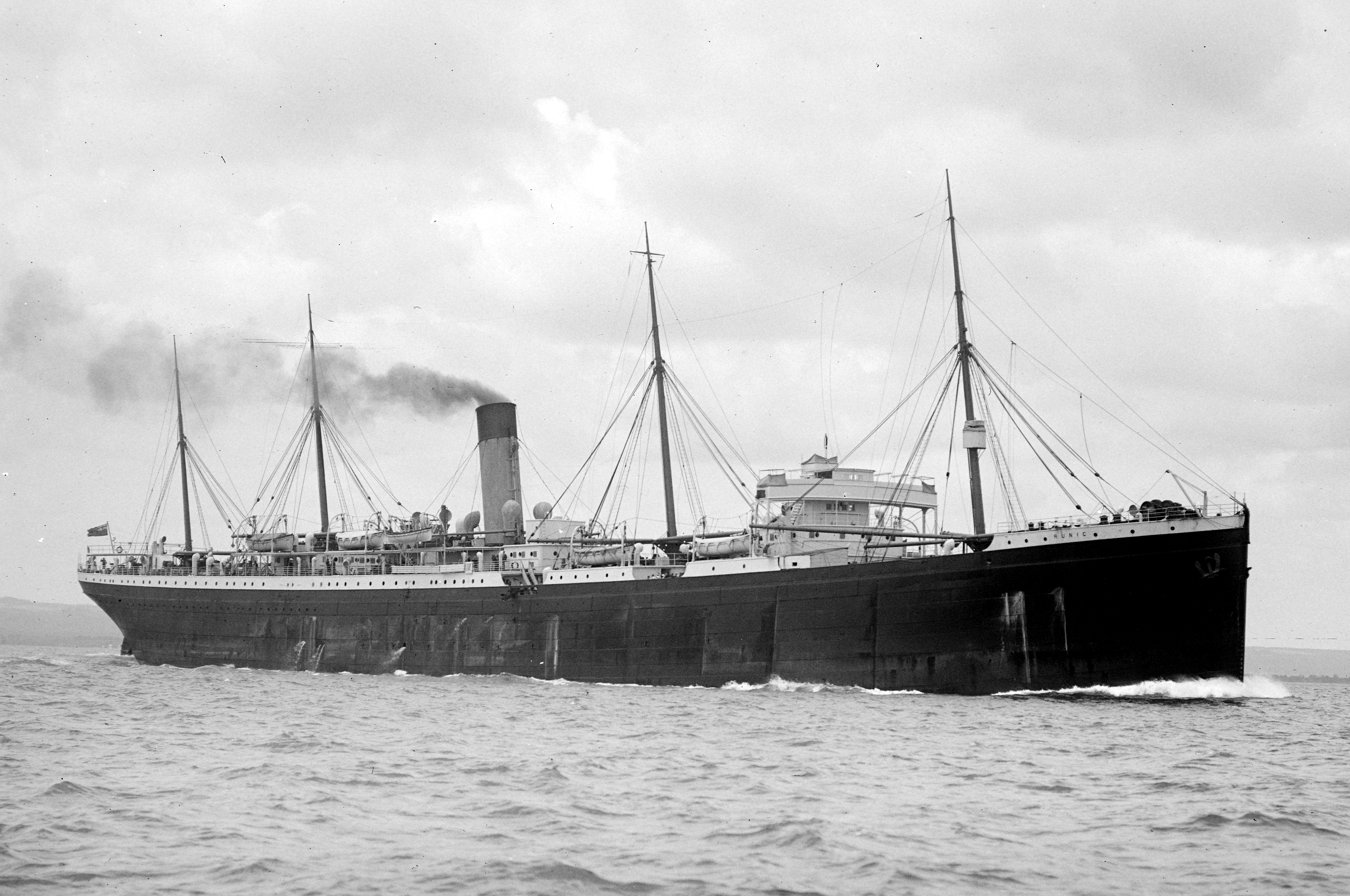
- SS Runic in Port Phillip Bay

History

United Kingdom
- Name: Runic (1900–1930)
- Owner: White Star Line (1900–1930)
- Builder: Harland and Wolff, Belfast, UK
- Yard number: 332
- Launched: 25 October 1900
- Completed: 22 December 1900
- Maiden voyage: 19 January 1901

Norway
- Name: New Sevilla
- Owner: A/S Sevilla
- Port of registry: Oslo, Norway
- Acquired: 1930
- Fate: Sold, 1931

United Kingdom
- Name: New Sevilla (1931–1940)
- Owner: Christian Salvesen (1931–1940)
- Out of service: 20 September 1940
- Fate: Torpedoed and sunk by U-138, 21 September 1940

General characteristics
- Class & type: Jubilee-class ocean liner
- Tonnage: 12,482 GRT
- Length: 550 ft (170 m)
- Beam: 63.4 ft (19.3 m)
- Installed power: Two four-cylinder quadruple-expansion steam engines
- Propulsion: Two propellers
- Speed: 14 knots (26 km/h; 16 mph) service speed
- Capacity: 400 third class passengers; 100,000 carcasses of mutton; 20,000 bales of wool

SS Runic was a steamship built at Harland and Wolff in Belfast for the White Star Line which entered service in 1901. Runic was the fourth of five Jubilee-class ocean liners built for White Star's Australia service along with her sister ship SS Suevic, where she ran on the Liverpool–Cape Town–Sydney route. She served this route until she was requisitioned for use as a war transport between 1915 and 1919, before returning to the Australia service.

She was the first White Star ship to be launched and enter service in the 20th century, and the second White Star ship to be named Runic, an earlier ship of that name had served the company between 1889 and 1895.

In 1930 Runic was sold and converted into a whaling factory ship and renamed New Sevilla, she remained in service in this role until September 1940 when she was torpedoed and sunk off the Irish coast with the loss of two lives.

== Design and construction ==
When White Star inaugurated service from Liverpool, England to Sydney, Australia in the late 1890s, they commissioned five steamships to be built for that route: the first three all entered service in 1899: Afric, Medic and Persic. All three were single-funnel liners which measured just under 12,000 gross register tons (GRT) and were configured to carry 320 third class passengers. Because the commissioning of these ships coincided with the Diamond Jubilee of Queen Victoria, they were referred to as the "Jubilee class". The next two ships of the class would be slightly larger than the first three. The first of these was Runic at 12,482 GRT, launched on 25 October 1900. The second, and largest of the class, was Suevic, at 12,531 GRT launched on 8 December 1900. Runic and Suevic had several minor design changes, the most noticeable of which were the lengthening of the poop deck, and the moving of the bridge closer to the bow. These ships could carry 400 passengers in third class on three decks. They also had substantial cargo capacity with seven cargo holds, most of which were refrigerated with the capacity for the stowage of 100,000 carcasses of mutton. There was also a hold designed for the transport of up to 20,000 bales of wool.

== White Star Line career ==
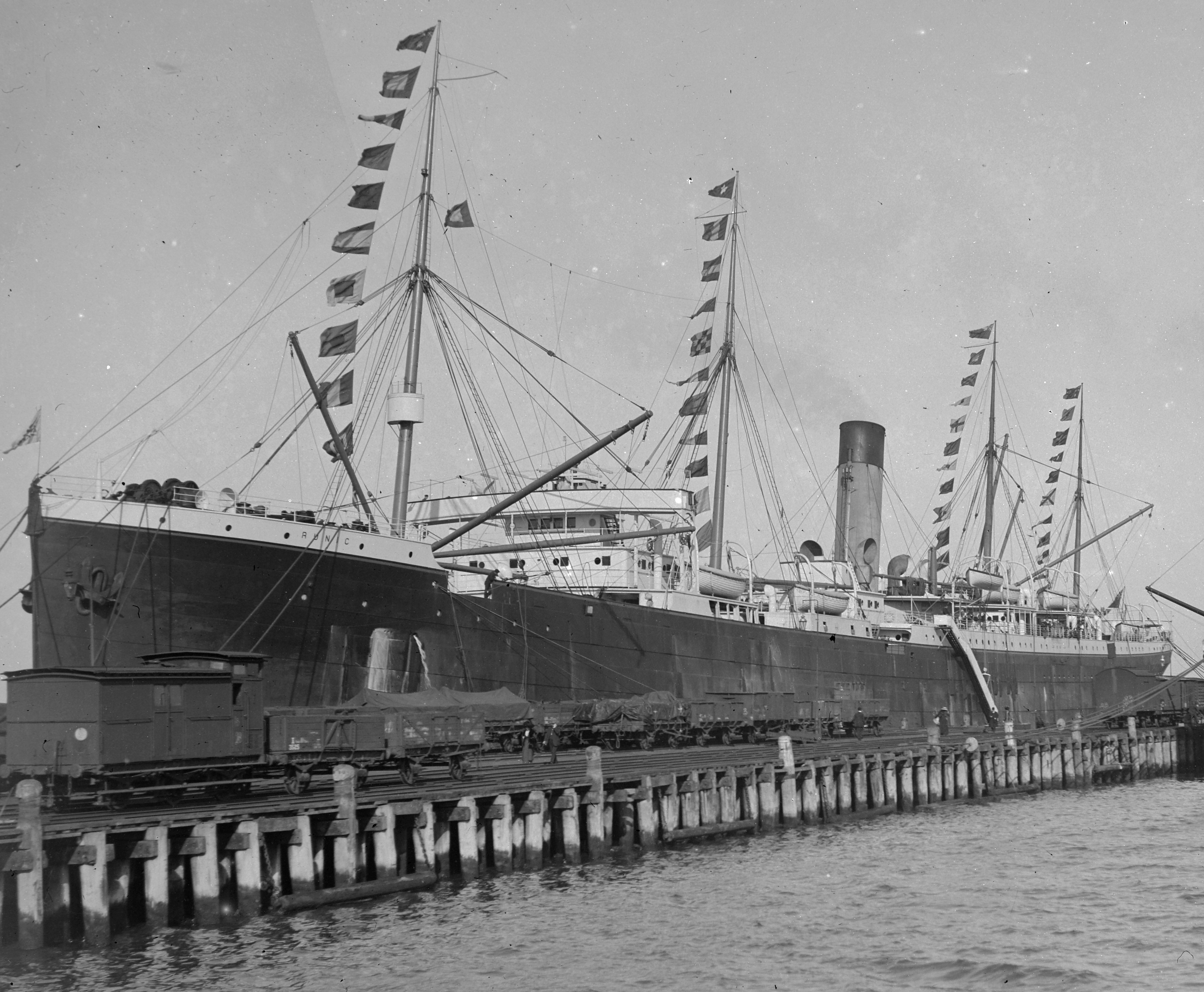
SS Runic at harbour

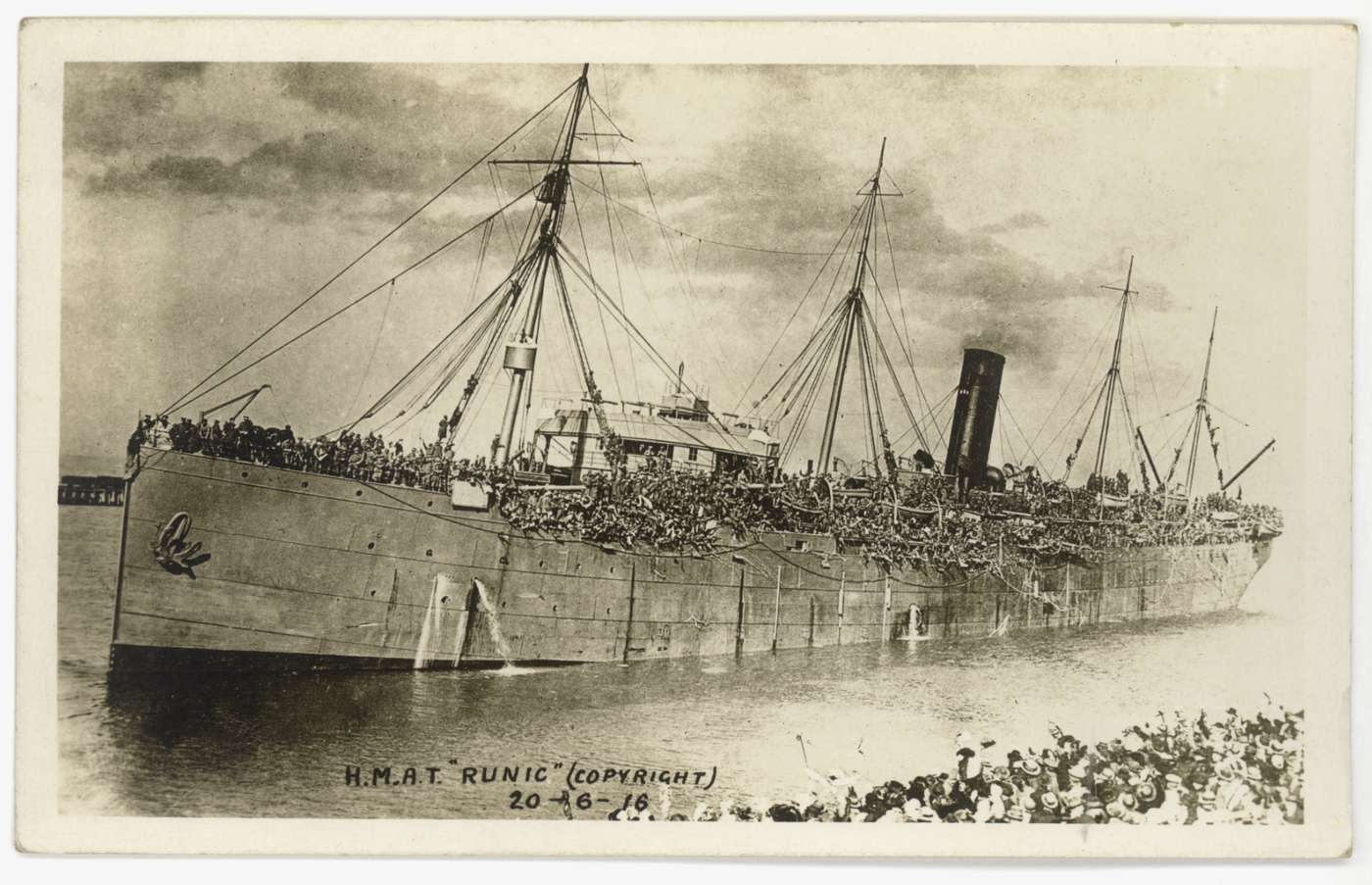
HMAT Runic during war service, 1916

Runic started her maiden voyage from Liverpool to Sydney on 19 January 1901, she quickly proved to be popular on the route. On 25 November that year she went to the assistance of the Union-Castle liner Dunottar Castle which had broken down, and towed the liner to the port of Dakar in West Africa.

Runic initially remained in commercial service after the outbreak of the First World War in August 1914, but on 21 January 1915 she was commissioned by the Australian government as a troop transport ship and was given the designation HMAT (His Majesty's Australian Transport) A54. On 1 May that year Runic collided with the 954-ton collier Horst Martini in fog whilst in the English Channel, the smaller ship sank, but there were no deaths. On 28 November 1917 she was commandeered under the Liner Requisition Scheme and remained so until she was released back into commercial service on 10 April 1919, when she returned to the Australian service.

In October 1921 Runic was sent back to Harland & Wolff for her passenger accommodation to be reconditioned. She spent most of the rest of the 1920s operating on the Australia service in tandem with Medic, Suevic and Ceramic. On 3 November 1928 when she was on an extended voyage to Glasgow, Scotland she collided with HMS London causing minor damage to her stern.

Runic made her last voyage to Australia for White Star in December 1929, following her return she was laid up for disposal after nearly 29 years of service.

== New Sevilla ==
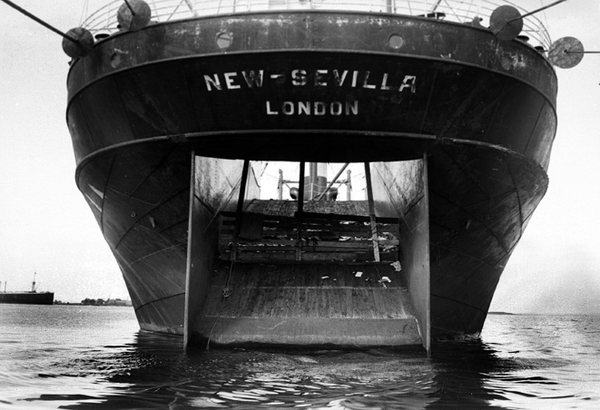
The stern of New Sevilla showing the stern ramp used to haul whale carcases onto deck, installed as part of the conversion to a whale factory ship.

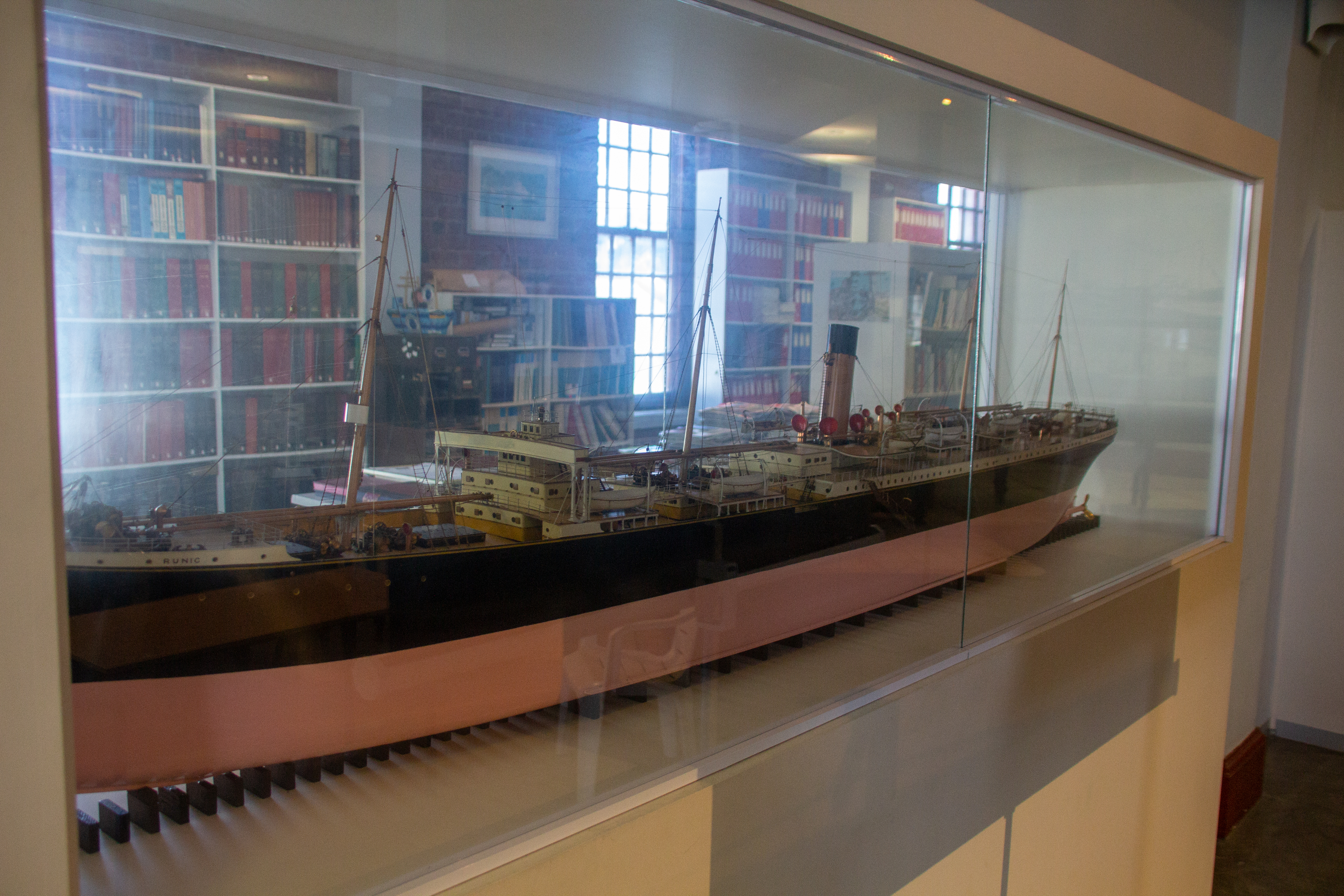
A model of the ship at the South African Maritime Museum

In July 1930 Runic was sold to the Sevilla Whaling Co. Of London, a subsidiary of A/S Sevilla of Norway, who converted her into a whaling factory ship at the Germania shipyard in Kiel. She was renamed New Sevilla. Following the rebuild she had an increased gross tonnage of 13,801. Soon after she entered service in her new role A/S Sevilla was taken over by the Scottish firm Christian Salvesen in April 1931.

After nearly a decade in this role, on 20 September 1940 during World War II New Sevilla was sailing as part of the convoy OB 216 from Liverpool to Antarctica when she was torpedoed by the German submarine U-138. She initially remained afloat and was taken in tow, but sank the next day, 30 miles (48 km) off Malin Head, Galway, Ireland at the position (55°48′N 07°22′W). 282 crew were saved, but two people died. The survivors were picked up by HMS Arabis and the Icelandic trawler Belgaum and landed at Belfast.
