= Kvarstad vessels =

The kvarstad vessels were a number of Norwegian ships held in arrest (Swedish: kvarstad) in Gothenburg during World War II. The ships had been visiting Swedish ports when the German invasion of Norway took place in April 1940. They were eventually claimed by Nortraship, which represented the Norwegian exile government and the British Government, but also by the Germany-supported Quisling regime in Norway. The fate of the ships was disputed through a number of diplomatic notes and trials between the involved parties. The disputed vessels originally numbered 42 ships, with a total of 170,000 ton dw. Some of the ships returned early to occupied Norway, some after recommendation from the Administrative Council. In January 1941 the British Operation Rubble succeeded in bringing five of the ships to the Orkney Islands.

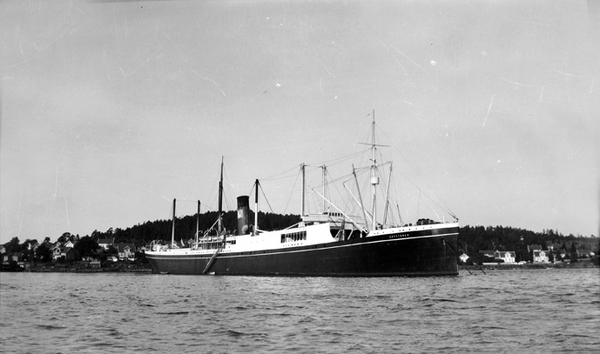
The whaler SS Skytteren was scuttled during Operation Performance.

In March 1942 the British led Operation Performance involved an effort to bring ten ships to the British Islands. Only two of the ships, MV B.P. Newton and MV Lind, reached Britain. Two ships, MV Storsten and MV Rigmor were sunk by German aircraft. Four ships were scuttled by their own crews, after being confronted by German warships. These were MS Buccaneer, SS Skytteren, SS Charente, and SS Gudvang. Two ships, MV Dicto and SS Lionel returned to Gothenburg. The total number of crew on the ten involved ships was 471. Of these 19 perished during the escape operation, 124 reached the British islands. and the 85 persons from Dicto and Lionel returned to Sweden. More than 200 from the ships were captured by the Germans. These included more than 160 Norwegian men and seven women, more than fifty British, two Dutch and one Polish. The captured sailors were brought to German prisons, first to the prisoner-of-war camp Marlag und Milag Nord near Bremen, where they were treated relatively well. The women were later released. While the British remained in the Milag camp, the Norwegian sailors were subject to war trials (at the Sondergericht in Rendsburg), and were eventually transferred to other prisons, as Nacht und Nebel prisoners with much tougher conditions. Of these, 43 died during their imprisonment, while 125 survived.

== See also ==
- Swedish overseas trade during World War II
