= SS Medic =

Steamship built in 1899

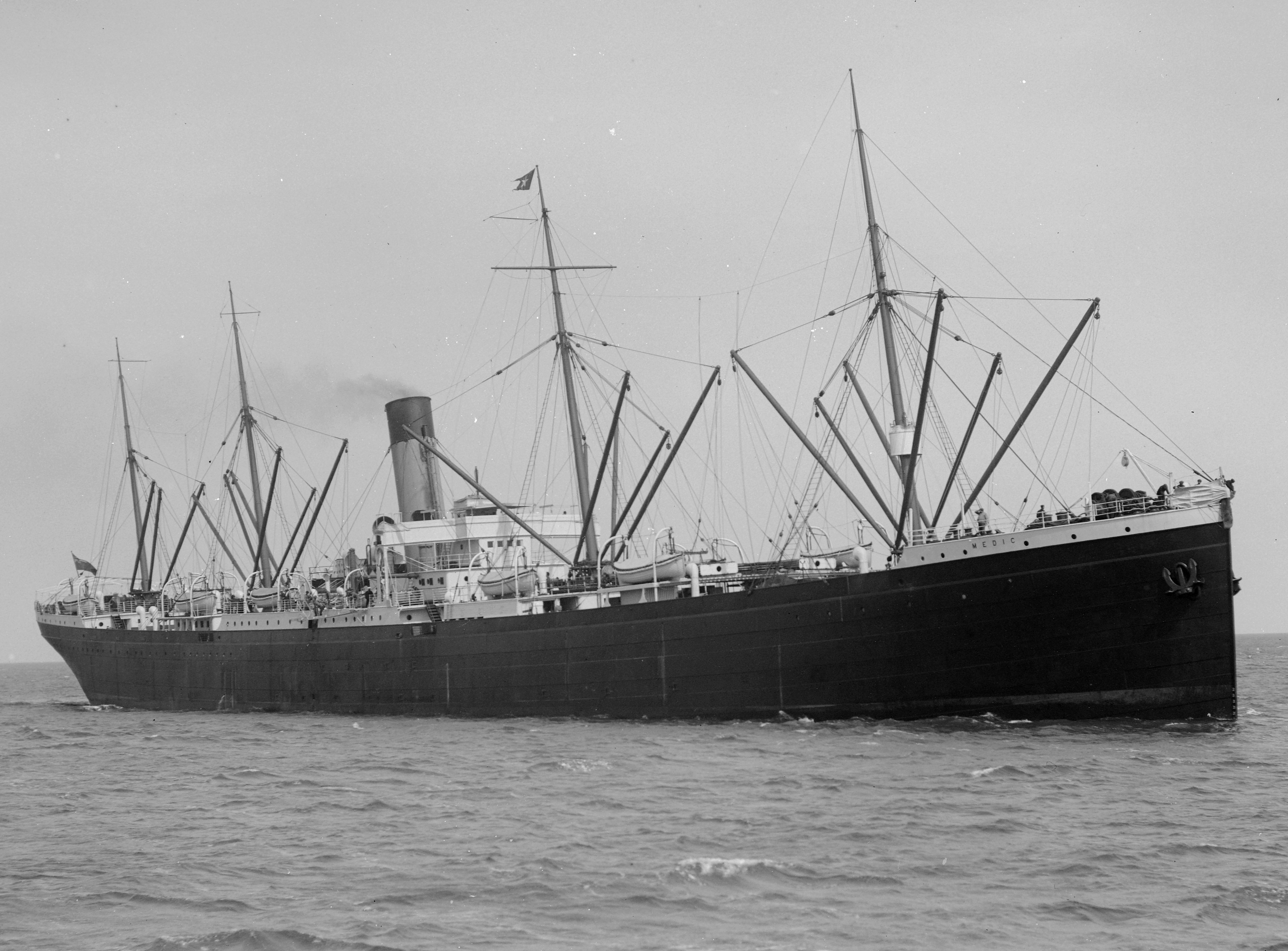
- SS Medic Underway

History

United Kingdom
- Name: Medic
- Owner: White Star Line
- Port of registry: Liverpool
- Builder: Harland & Wolff, Belfast
- Yard number: 323
- Launched: 15 December 1898
- Completed: 6 July 1899
- In service: August 1899
- Out of service: 1927
- Identification: Official number: 110573; Call sign: RDHF
- Fate: Sold, 1928

Norway
- Name: Hektoria
- Owner: A/S Hektor (N. Bugge)
- Port of registry: Tønsberg
- Acquired: 1928
- Fate: Sold in 1932

United Kingdom
- Name: Hektoria
- Operator: Hektor Whaling Ltd
- Port of registry: London
- Acquired: 1932
- Fate: Torpedoed and sunk, 12 September 1942

General characteristics (as built)
- Class & type: Jubilee-class passenger-cargo ship
- Tonnage: 11,985 GRT
- Length: 550 ft 2 in (167.69 m)
- Beam: 63 ft 3 in (19.28 m)
- Propulsion: 2 × 4-cylinder quadruple expansion steam engines, 2 shafts
- Speed: 13.5 knots (25.0 km/h; 15.5 mph)
- Capacity: 320 passengers; 100,000 refrigerated carcasses

SS Medic was a steamship built by Harland and Wolff in Belfast for the White Star Line which entered service in 1899. Medic was one of five Jubilee-class ocean liners (the others being the Afric, Persic, Runic and Suevic) built specifically to service the Liverpool–Cape Town–Sydney route. The ship's name pertained to the ancient Persian region of Media and was pronounced Mee-dic.

Medic was the second Jubilee-class ship to be built for the Australia service. Like her sisters she was a single funnel liner, measuring just under 12,000 gross register tons (GRT), which had capacity for 320 passengers in third class on three decks, she also had substantial cargo capacity with seven cargo holds, most of them refrigerated for the transport of Australian meat.

After a long career with White Star, Medic was sold in 1928 and was converted into a whaling factory ship and renamed Hektoria, she remained in service in this role until being torpedoed and sunk during World War II in the Atlantic Ocean whilst sailing in a convoy in 1942.

== White Star Line career ==
Medic was launched at Belfast on 15 December 1898, but her completion was delayed until 6 July the following year, so that improvements that were being made to her earlier sister Afric could be incorporated into her construction.

Medic inaugurated White Star's new Australia service with her maiden voyage, which started from Liverpool on 3 August 1899, she was then the largest ship ever to sail to Australia. Although Afric was the first ship built for the service, she did not make her first voyage to Australia until the following month. On board the maiden voyage was Charles Lightoller on his first assignment as fourth mate, he would later become the only senior officer to survive the sinking of the Titanic. Upon Medic's arrival in Australia she was greeted with a rapturous reception. Lightoller wrote:

"She was a show ship, the biggest that had ever been out there, and the people in Australia gave us the time of our lives. Everything and everywhere it was Medic"

On her first return trip to the UK, Medic carried Australian troops to South Africa for the Boer War which had started in October 1899, and continued to carry troops to the conflict until it concluded in 1902. In October 1900, while Medic was anchored in Neutral Bay, Sydney Harbour, Charles Lightoller and some shipmates were involved in the "Fort Denison Incident", a prank intended to fool locals into believing a Boer raiding party was attacking the city. The culprits were never apprehended but Lightoller confessed to his company's superiors, after which he was transferred to the Atlantic route.

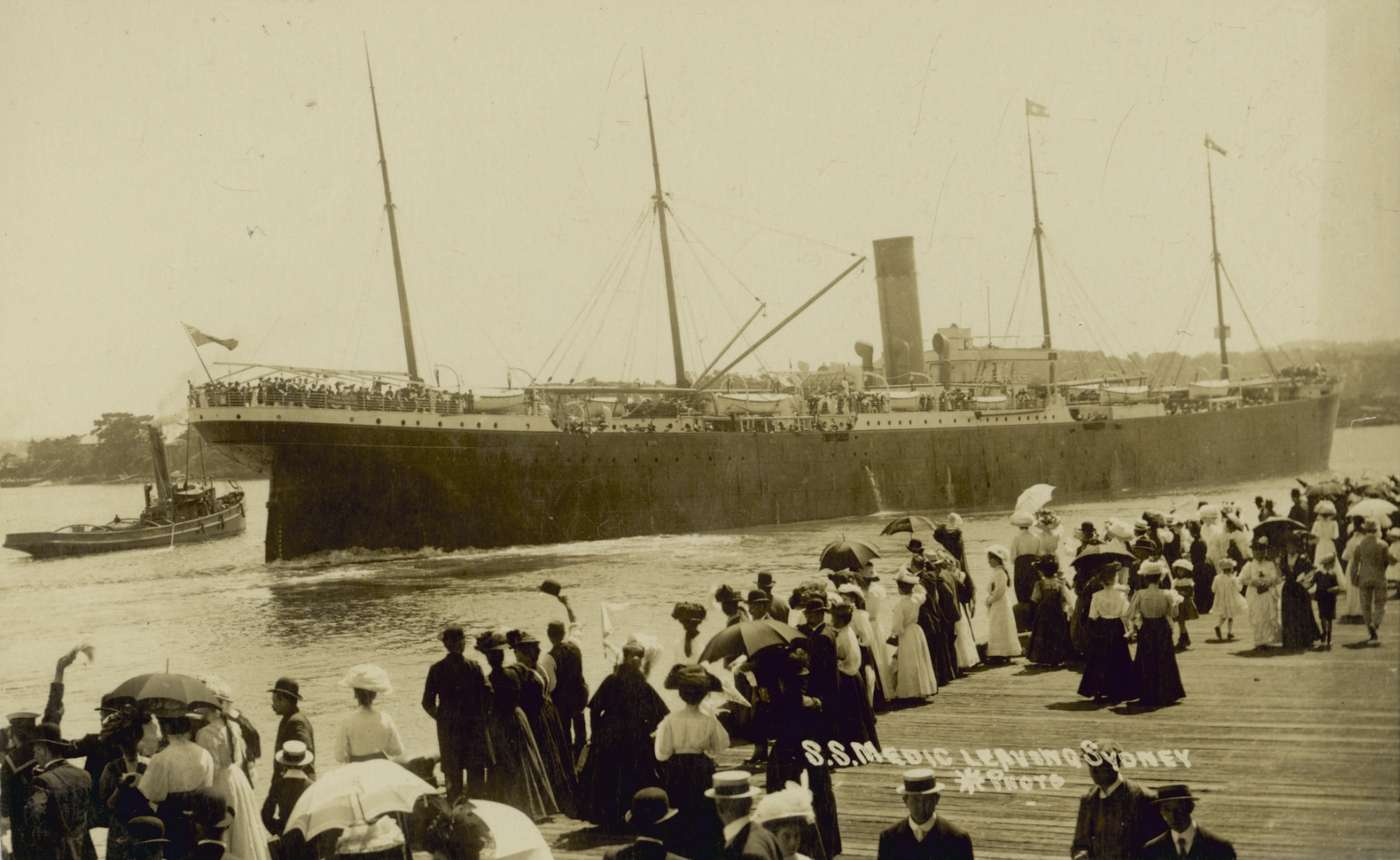
Medic leaving Sydney, in the 1900s

On 15 June 1907 Medic collided with the 4,134-ton petroleum tank steamer Turbo in fog in the English Channel off the Kent coast while sailing from London to Liverpool. The Turbo was seriously damaged and had to be towed to harbour: The damage to Medic at first appeared to only consist of a crack above the waterline, and so she continued her voyage to Liverpool where she was dry docked for a more thorough examination of the damage: Here it was discovered that Medic had a 5 sq ft (0.46 m^{2}) hole below the waterline; several lumber plates having been loosened and displaced.

Medic initially continued on her scheduled commercial service following the outbreak of the First World War in 1914, because of her large refrigerated meat carrying capacity; however, she also carried Australian troops to Britain, as such she gained the designation HMAT (His Majesty's Australian Transport) A7. In November 1914 John Simpson Kirkpatrick departed Australia on board Medic, he would later become famous for his role as a stretcher bearer during the Gallipoli Campaign. In May 1915 Medic was refitted at Sydney to carry 531 troops and 500 horses, to make her better suited to her wartime role. Medic was later commandeered under the British Liner Requisition Scheme in October 1917, and was used as a troopship, until being released from government service in March 1919, after which she returned to the Australian service.

In 1920, Medic underwent a refit where her passenger accommodation was modernised and reconfigured to carry 260 passengers in second class. She continued in service on the Australian route for most of the 1920s, in consort with the Persic, Runic and Suevic. She made her last voyage for White Star on this route in December 1927; following her return she was laid up for disposal after 28 years of service.

== Hektoria ==
In June 1928 Medic was sold for £35,000 to A/S Hektor (N. Bugge) of Tønsberg, Norway, who converted her into a whale factory ship and renamed her Hektoria (thus she became SS Hektoria). The conversion was carried out by Grayson Rollo and Clover Docks at Birkenhead, and involved the installation of a stern ramp, whereby whale carcasses could be hauled onto deck, the fitting of eighteen large cargo tanks which could hold 8,000 tons of whale oil, and the enlargement of her coal bunkers. Altogether the refit increased the gross register tonnage of the ship to 13,834. Hektoria was ready for service for the 1928–29 whaling season off South Georgia.

On 22 September 1928, the members of the Wilkins-Hearst Antarctic Expedition boarded Hektoria at New York, they would live on board the ship for the next five months. The aim of the expedition was to explore Antarctica from the air for the first ever time, and two aircraft were carried on board the ship for this purpose. Several exploratory flights were made over the Antarctic Peninsula. The Hektoria Glacier in the Antarctic was named after the ship by the expedition.

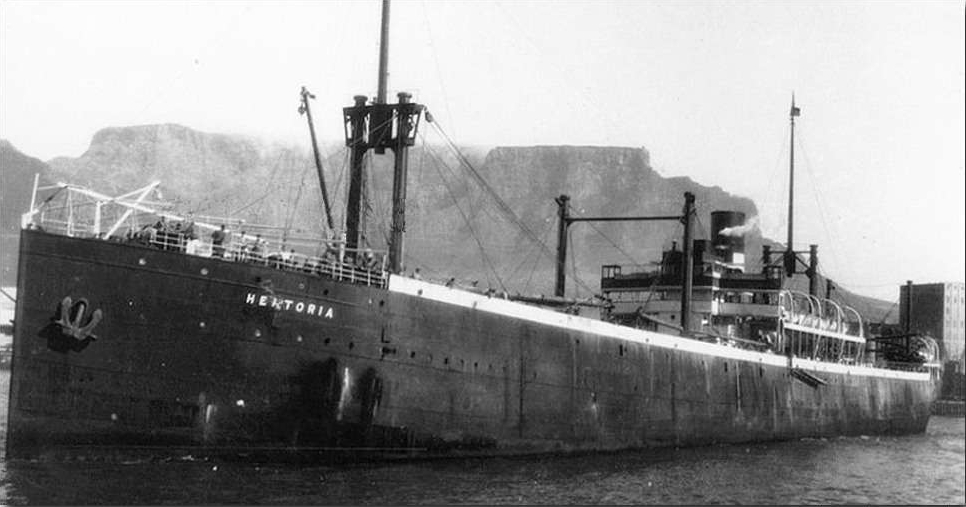
Hektoria

In 1932 Hektoria returned to the British register after her ownership was transferred to Hektor Whaling Ltd of London, but remained involved in the same trade as before.

On the outbreak of the Second World War, Hektoria was requisitioned by the Ministry of War Transport for use as an oil tanker. She met her end on 12 September 1942 while sailing in the Atlantic convoy ON 127: As the oldest ship in the convoy, Hektoria struggled to keep up with the other ships and straggled behind, she was hit and damaged by two torpedoes fired by the German U-boat U-211. After the crew abandoned ship she was torpedoed again and sunk by the U-boat U-608 at the position (48°55′N 33°38′W). One crewman lost his life, but the remaining 85 crew members survived and were picked up by the Canadian corvette, HMCS Arvida and landed at St. John's, Newfoundland. Thus ending the ship's career which had spanned a total of 43 years.

== Notable officers ==
All three of RMS Titanic's senior officers served on the Medic early in their career. Henry Tingle Wilde was Chief Officer, William McMaster Murdoch was First Officer and Charles Lightoller was Second Officer of the famed liner during its ill-fated maiden voyage. Of the three, only Lightoller survived the sinking of Titanic.

After the sinking, Titanic's surviving fifth officer Harold Lowe made his first post-disaster voyage on the Medic as its third officer.
