= SS Afric =

English ship

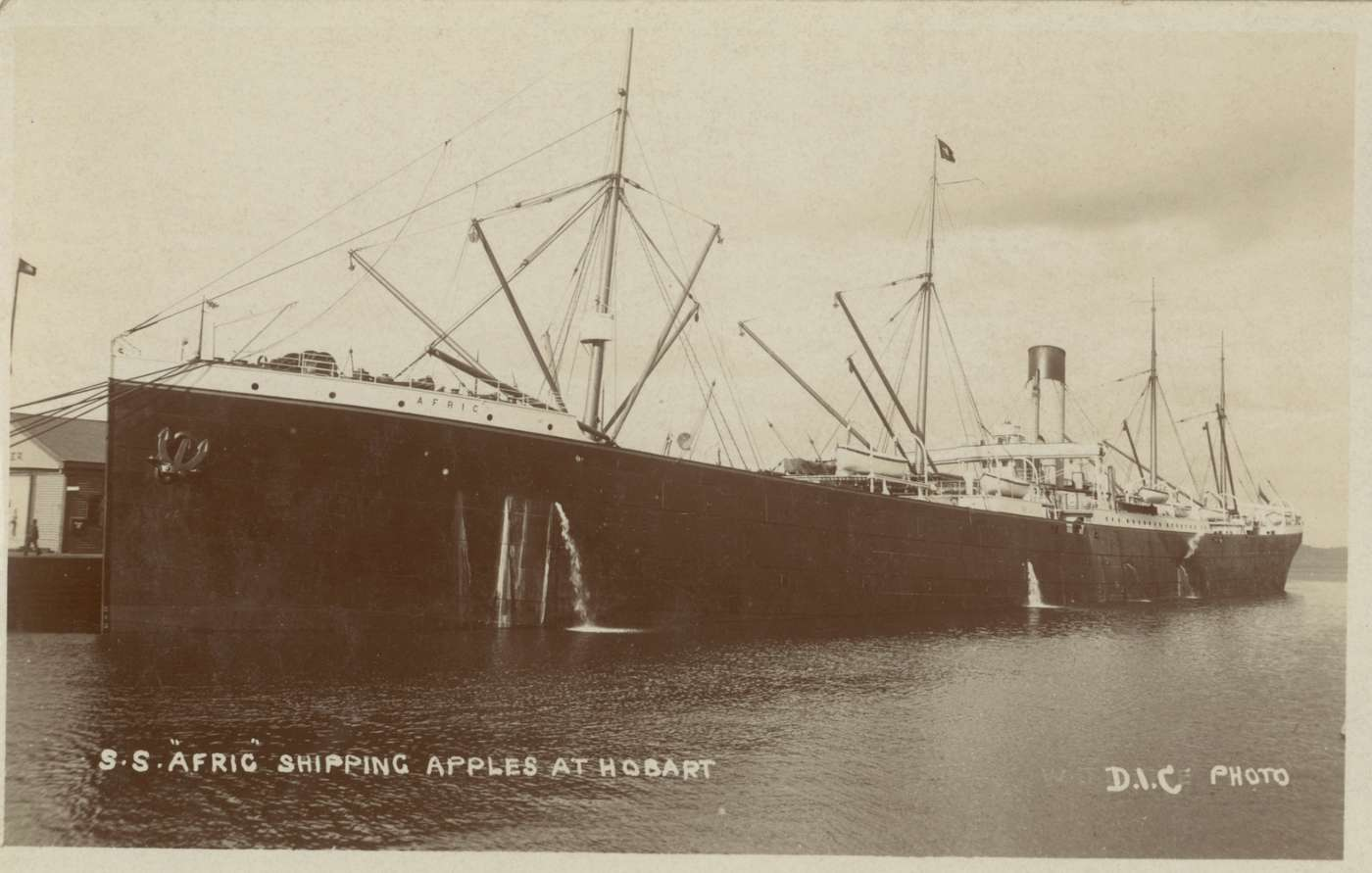
- Afric at Hobart, Tasmania

History

United Kingdom
- Name: Afric
- Owner: White Star Line
- Builder: Harland and Wolff, Belfast
- Launched: 16 November 1898
- Maiden voyage: 8 February 1899
- Fate: Sunk by SM UC-66, 12 February 1917

General characteristics
- Class & type: Jubilee-class ocean liner
- Tonnage: 11,948 GRT
- Length: 550 ft (167.6 m)
- Beam: 63.3 ft (19.3 m)
- Installed power: Two four-cylinder quadruple-expansion steam engines
- Propulsion: Two propellers
- Speed: 13.5 knots (25.0 km/h; 15.5 mph) service speed
- Capacity: 320 passengers; 15,000 DWT of cargo capacity

SS Afric was a steamship built for White Star Line by Harland and Wolff shipyards. She was of the Jubilee class, had a reported gross register tonnage of 11,948, and had a port of registry of Liverpool, England. Afric was launched on November 16, 1898, and was involved in shipping between Liverpool and Australia.

Afric was the first of five Jubilee-class ships built by White Star Line for their new service to Australia, the others were Medic, Persic, Runic and Suevic. Afric was a single-funnel liner with a capacity for 320 third-class passengers on three decks, she also had substantial cargo capacity with seven cargo holds, most of them refrigerated for the transport of Australian meat.

== Service history ==
Afric made her maiden voyage on 8 February 1899, between Liverpool and New York; this was considered a test run, and when she returned she underwent further work to prepare her for her intended career on the Australia service. She entered service between Liverpool and Sydney via Cape Town on 9 September 1899.

During the Boer War from 1900 to 1902, Afric was used to transport troops and horses to South Africa on the outbound part of her journey, returning them to the UK on the return journey.

Following the conclusion of the war, Afric settled into the routine of normal peacetime service, which was mostly uneventful, except for one incident in November 1913 when she ran aground and became stuck on a sandbank in the River Mersey whilst leaving the Canada Dock at Liverpool. After several unsuccessful attempts to free her, she was eventually pulled off the sandbank by tugs at high tide after her cargo had been removed by barges to lighten the ship.

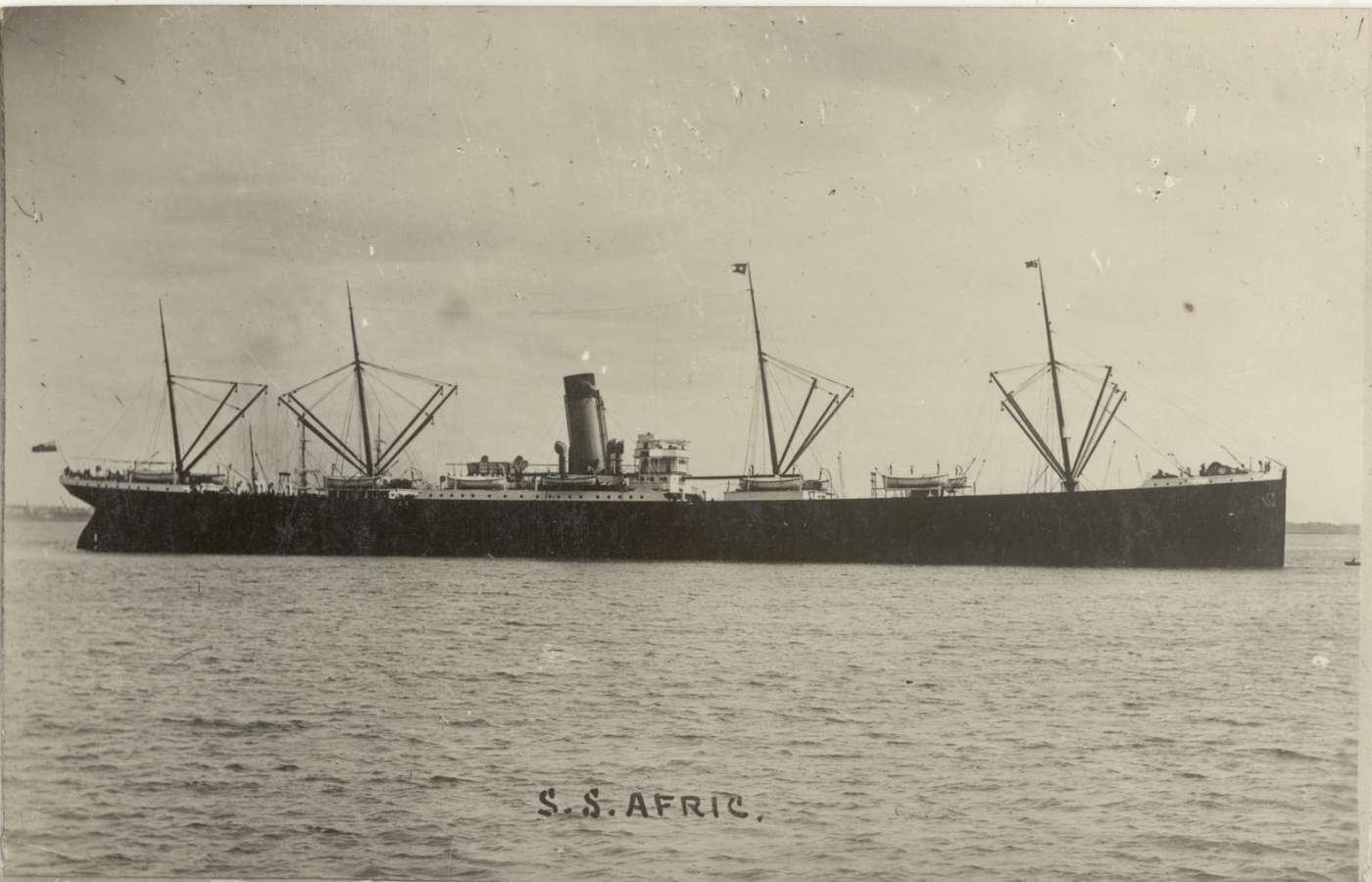
Side view of Afric

Following the outbreak of the First World War in 1914, Afric was requisitioned by the Australian government in October 1914 for use as a troopship and was given the designation HMAT (His Majesty's Australian Transport) A19.

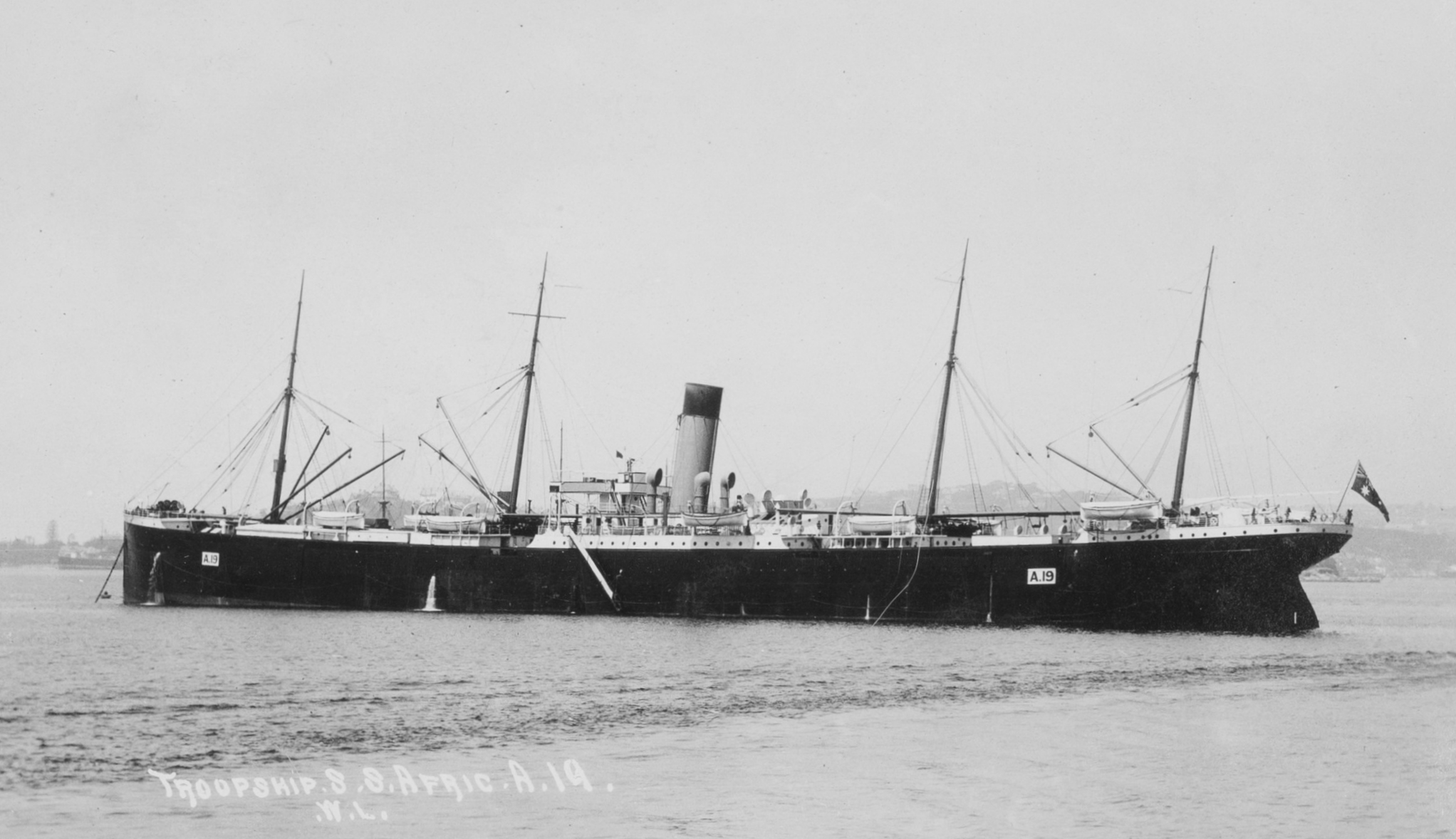
SS Afric in Sydney during the First World War

In April/May 1915, she was refitted at Sydney to carry 549 troops and 500 horses. She completed six troopship voyages up to November 1916, however on 12 February 1917 she was sunk in the English Channel after being torpedoed by the German submarine SM UC-66, whilst sailing outbound between Liverpool and Plymouth, 12 miles (19 km) south south-west of the Eddystone Lighthouse, there were 145 survivors, but 22 people lost their lives.

== Wreck ==
Footage of the wreck of Afric, filmed in 2012

The wreck lies at the position (49°59′N 04°18′W) at a depth of around 70 metres (229.7 feet), and has been filmed by divers.
