= SS Suevic =

British and Norwegian Jubilee-class ocean liner

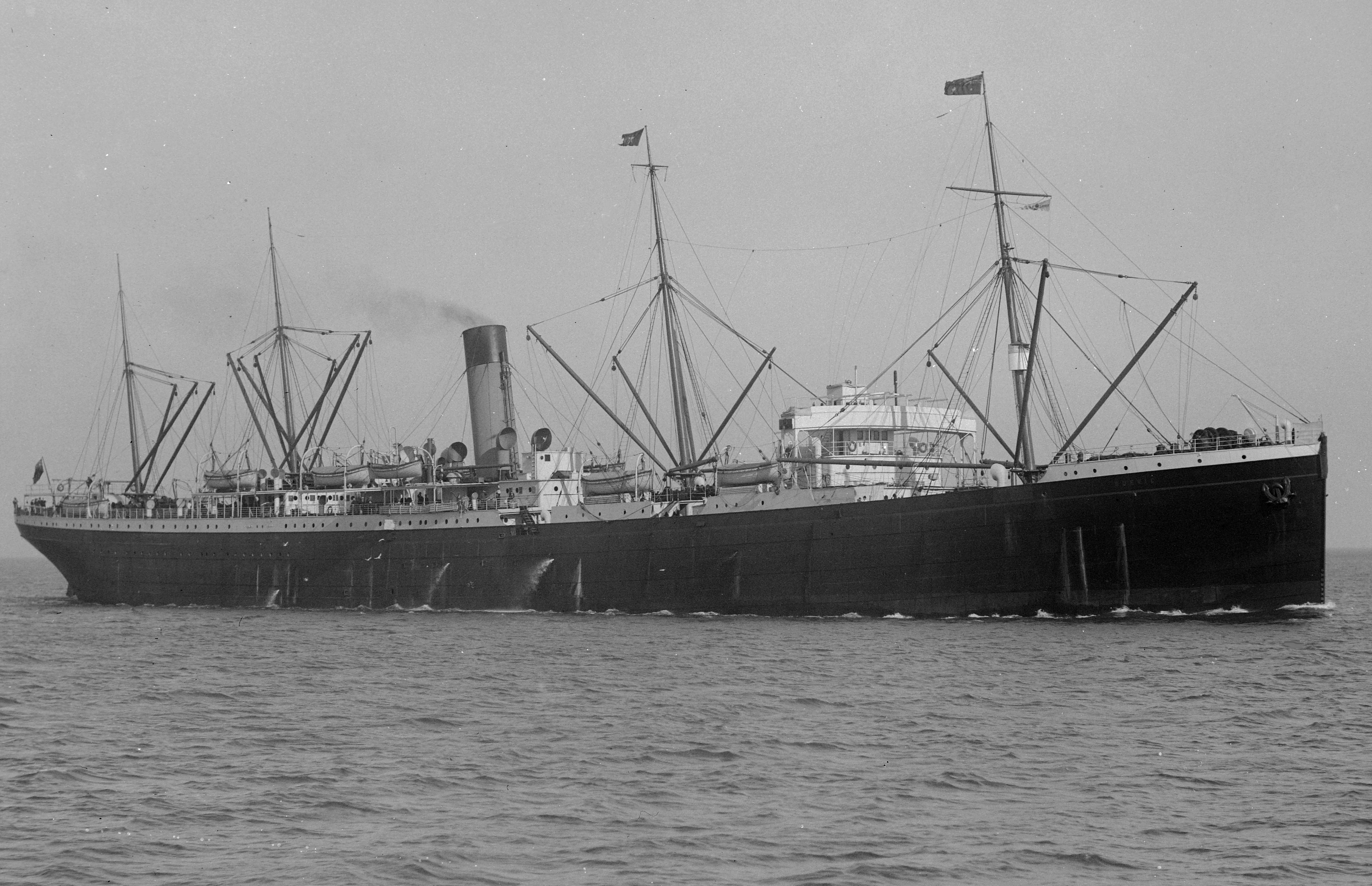
- SS Suevic c. 1908–28

History

United Kingdom
- Name: Suevic
- Owner: White Star Line
- Port of registry: Liverpool, England
- Ordered: 1899
- Builder: Harland and Wolff shipyard, Belfast
- Yard number: 333
- Launched: 8 December 1900
- Completed: 9 March 1901
- Maiden voyage: 23 March 1901
- Fate: Sold, 1928

Norway
- Name: Skytteren
- Owner: Finnhval A/S
- In service: 1928
- Home port: Tønsberg, Norway
- Fate: Scuttled 1 April 1942

General characteristics
- Class & type: Jubilee-class ocean liner
- Tonnage: 12,531 GRT
- Length: 565 ft (172 m)
- Beam: 63.3 ft (19.3 m)
- Depth: 39.9 ft (12.2 m)
- Installed power: Two Four-cylinder quadruple-expansion steam engines
- Propulsion: Two propellers
- Speed: 13.5 knots (25.0 km/h; 15.5 mph) service speed
- Capacity: 400 passengers 3rd class only

SS Suevic was a steamship built by Harland and Wolff in Belfast for the White Star Line. Suevic was the fifth and last of the Jubilee-class ocean liners, built specifically to service the Liverpool-Cape Town-Sydney route, along with her sister ship Runic. In 1907, she was wrecked off the south coast of England, but in the largest rescue of its kind, all passengers and crew were saved. The ship herself was deliberately broken in two, and a new bow was attached to the salvaged stern portion. Later serving as a Norwegian whaling factory ship carrying the name Skytteren, she was scuttled off the Swedish coast in 1942 to prevent her capture by ships of Nazi Germany.

== Design and construction ==
When White Star inaugurated service from Liverpool to Sydney in the late 1890s, they commissioned five steamships to be built for that route: the first three all entered service in 1899: Afric, Medic and Persic. All three were single-funnel ocean liners which measured just under 12,000 gross register tons (GRT) and were configured to carry 320 third class passengers. Because the commissioning of these ships coincided with the Diamond Jubilee of Queen Victoria, they were referred to as the Jubilee class. The next two ships of the class would be slightly larger than the first three. The first of these was Runic at 12,482 GRT, launched on 25 October 1900. The second, and largest of the class, was Suevic, at 12,531 GRT launched on 8 December 1900. Runic and Suevic had several minor design changes, the most noticeable of which were the lengthening of the poop deck, and the moving of the bridge closer to the bow. These ships could carry 400 passengers in third class on three decks. They also had substantial cargo capacity with seven cargo holds, most of which were refrigerated with the capacity for the stowage of 100,000 carcasses of mutton. There was also a hold designed for the transport of up to 20,000 bales of wool.

== White Star service ==
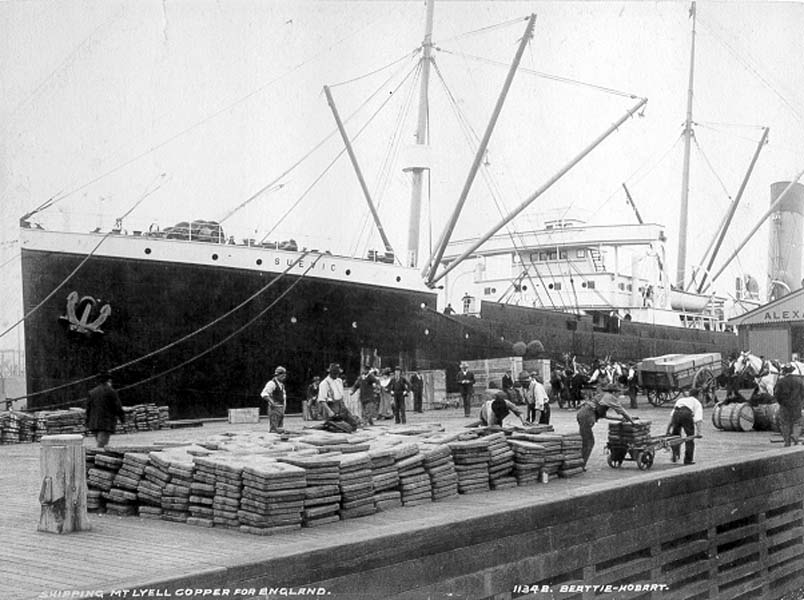
Suevic docked in Hobart, Australia, between c. 1901–07.

Suevic was launched on 8 December 1900, and set sail on her maiden voyage to Sydney on 23 March 1901. Shortly thereafter, Suevic and her four sisters were pressed into service carrying troops to fight in the Boer War in South Africa. In August 1901, she made her one and only voyage from Liverpool to New York City. Once the Boer War was over, White Star was finally able to institute regular monthly service to Australia using the Jubilee-class ships.

On one 1903 voyage, a young officer named Charles Lightoller was assigned to crew Suevic as a punishment. During the voyage, he met an 18-year-old woman who was returning to her home in Sydney, and after a shipboard courtship, the two were married in Sydney on 15 December 1903. Lightoller would later become the second officer on board the Titanic and the most senior of her crew to survive the disaster.

=== Shipwreck ===
==== Navigational errors ====
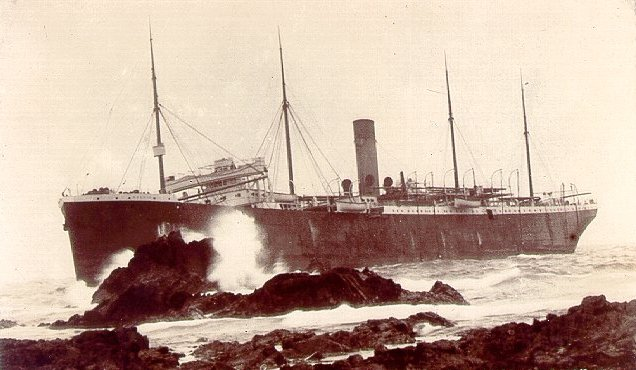
Wreck of the White Star liner Suevic at the Lizard, Cornwall, 17 March 1907

Suevic's first six years of service were uneventful. On 2 February 1907, she left Melbourne under the command of Captain Thomas Johnson Jones with scheduled stops at Cape Town, Tenerife, Plymouth, London and finally Liverpool. On 17 March 1907, she was inbound to Plymouth with 382 passengers, 141 crew members and a nearly-full cargo, including thousands of sheep carcasses worth £400,000.

By noon, she was off the southwest coast of England on the approach to Plymouth. This section of the English coast was hazardous, due to shallow waters, sharp rocks, and often-dense fog. By 10 pm, Suevic was encountering a strong south-westerly winds and severely reduced visibility due to showers of drizzling rain, the ship's officers were not able to fix their position using stellar navigation, so they intended to use instead the Lizard lighthouse on Lizard Point, Cornwall (known simply as "The Lizard"). At 10:15 pm the lighthouse was sighted through the gloom: at the ship's estimated position it should have been more than 10 miles (16 km) away, however unbeknown to the crew, due to miscalculations Suevic was 16 miles (26 km) ahead of her estimated position.

Not realising the error, the captain wrongly estimated that the lighthouse was several miles away; this was in part due to fog over the lighthouse which threw its beam down low on the horizon, and made it appear further away than it actually was. The ship pressed ahead at full speed, without using the sounding line to ensure they were not approaching the shore. Soon afterwards, at 10:25 pm the lookout sighted breaking waves ahead, the Captain ordered hard a-port, but it was too late, and the ship ran aground violently at full speed on the Stag Rock on Maenheere Reef - a belt of half-submerged rocks a mile off Lizard Point.

==== Rescue ====
Jones first made several attempts to back the ship off the rocks, running the engines at full astern, to no avail. Despite her position, the ship did not appear to be in danger of sinking. The captain ordered the distress rockets to be fired, and a local rescue effort ensued, with all the passengers and crew escaping to shore safely.

The rescue of the crew was led by the Royal National Lifeboat Institution (RNLI), and it became the largest rescue in that institution's 201-year history. RNLI lifeboats, manned by local volunteers from stations at the Lizard, Cadgwith, Coverack and Porthleven, rescued all the passengers, including 70 babies, as well as the crew. The rescue was undertaken using nothing more than four open wooden lifeboats each rowed by six oarsmen. The operation took 16 hours to complete, and despite the difficult conditions, not a single life was lost.

By coincidence, later the same night, another smaller liner SS Jebba of the Elder Dempster Line also ran aground along the same coastline, almost within sight of Suevic, with its crew and passengers also requiring rescue.

As a result of the successful efforts of the rescuers, six silver RNLI medals were awarded; four to members of the lifeboat crews, and two to members of Suevic's crew for their actions: Two silver RNLI gallantry medals were awarded to Edwin Rutter and Rev. "Harry" Vyvyan, of the Cadgwith Lifeboat crew: another two were awarded to William Mitchell, and Edwin Mitchell, of The Lizard Lifeboat crew. Two more were awarded to George Anderson and William "Bill" Adams of Suevic's crew.

In March 2007, a ceremony was held to commemorate the 100th anniversary of the rescue.

==== Salvage ====
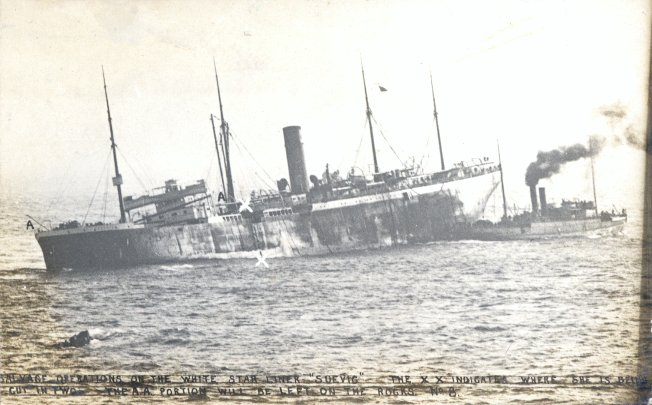
Salvage operations on the White Star liner Suevic. The X-X indicates where she is being cut in two. The A-A portion will be left on the rocks.

The bow section was badly damaged, but not irreparably so, and the rest of the ship, including the boilers and engines, was not damaged at all. It was determined that if the ship could be lightened, the tide would then lift her off the bottom and she could be sailed to port. With this in mind, three days later, on 20 March, the cargo was unloaded into small coastal freighters. Initially, it appeared that the attempt would succeed but, a week later, after various other vessels had attempted to pull Suevic off the rocks, the weather deteriorated and waves drove her farther onto shore, from whence she could not be moved.

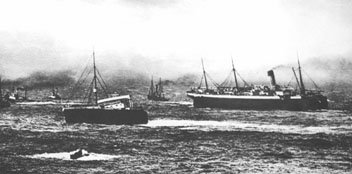
The Suevic's stern after being separated from her bow. Her bow will be left on the rocks while the stern is towed to Southampton.

With the bow now irretrievably stuck, and the threat of even worse weather coming which could completely destroy the ship, many experienced salvage men believed that the only course of action was to abandon Suevic to her fate. However, the Liverpool & Glasgow Salvage Association, acting on behalf of the White Star Line, suggested an unorthodox method of salvaging the ship. As the rear 400 feet (120 m) of the ship's length was undamaged and this portion contained the boilers, engines and passenger accommodation, they believed it would be worthwhile to attempt saving the stern half of the ship by cutting the ship in two and separating it from the impaled bow. White Star decided this was a worthwhile risk as, if successful, rebuilding the ship would be a cheaper option than building a replacement vessel.

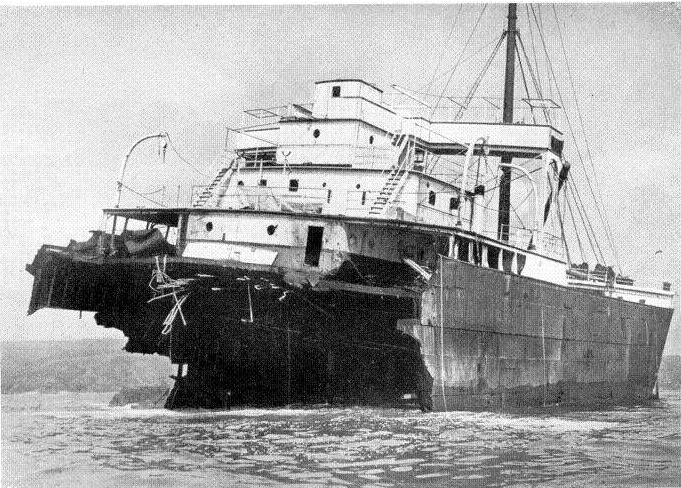
The original bow of Suevic was left on the rocks.

Suevic, like other White Star liners, had been divided into watertight compartments by watertight bulkheads which could, if they held their integrity, allow the ship to remain afloat even if divided. Engineers selected a point just aft of the bridge to cut the ship in two. As oxyacetylene was not available in 1907, this had to be achieved by detonating carefully-positioned charges of dynamite. The work to place the explosive charges was hazardous, and took several days, as it could only be undertaken by divers at high or low tide when there was little tidal movement. The move was a success, and on 2 April, the aft half of the ship floated free. The exposed watertight bulkhead remained secure, and Suevic was able to steam under her own power, in reverse and guided by tugs, to Southampton. The damaged bow was left on the rocks to be broken up by the waves, as well as to be scavenged by locals. Whatever was left of the bow was broken up by the pounding waves on the night of 9/10 May 1907.

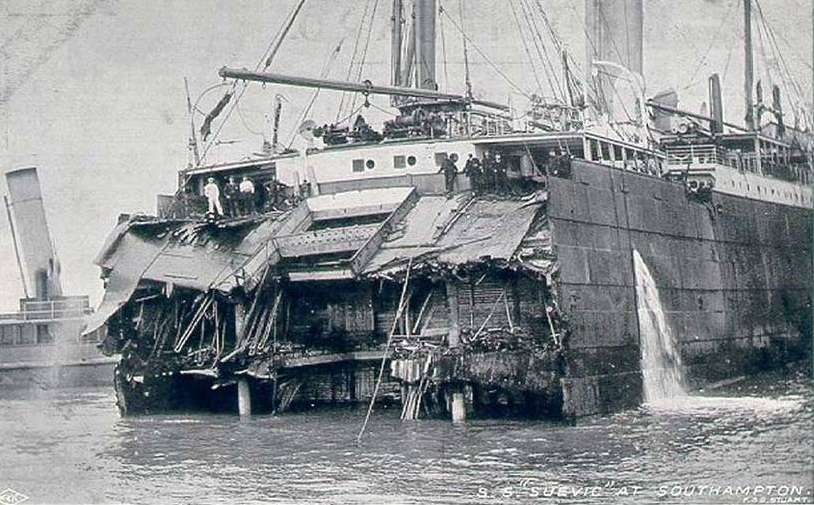
Suevic's stern after arrival at Southampton

==== Rebuilding ====
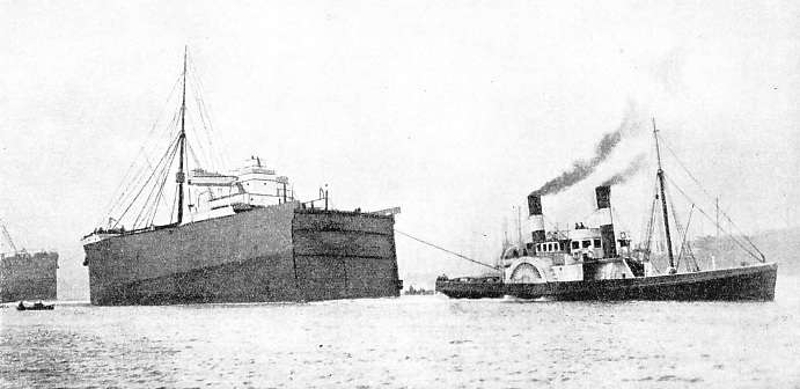
Suevic's new bow being towed to Southampton

Suevic's stern was taken first to Southampton's Test Quay where it docked on 4 April, and attracted considerable crowds and publicity. Two days later, it was taken to be dry docked at the Trafalgar drydock, owned by Harland & Wolff, where preliminary repair work was undertaken. White Star then ordered a new 212-foot (65 m) bow section from Harland and Wolff in Belfast, which was slightly longer than the original to allow proper grafting. The new bow was launched head-first on 5 October 1907. It was popularly said at the time that Suevic was the longest ship in the world, with her bow in Belfast and her stern in Southampton.

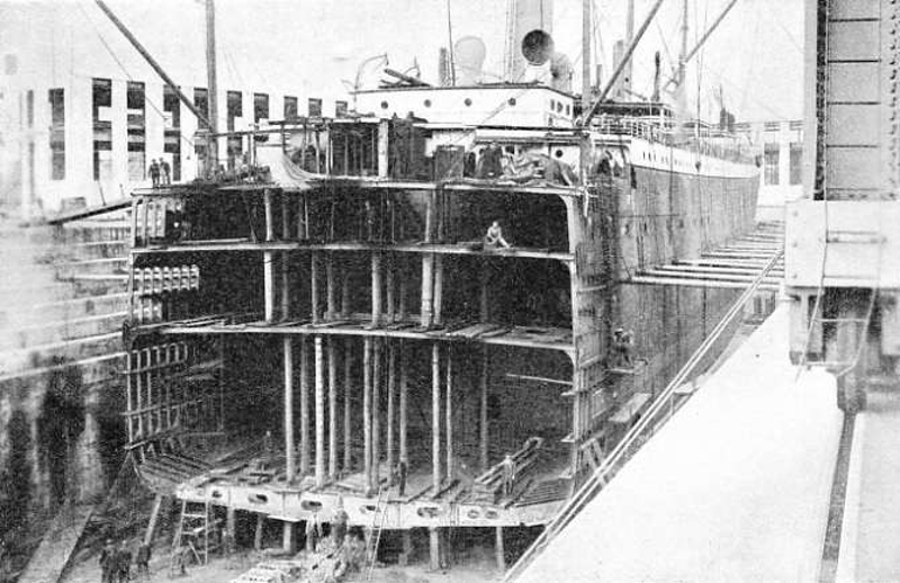
Suevic in dry dock awaiting her new bow

The new bow arrived on 26 October. By mid-November it was in position and being joined to the rest of the ship. Men from the shipbuilders, J. I. Thornycroft, in Southampton were also employed to assist the Harland and Wolff workforce in getting Suevic rebuilt as quickly as possible, the bow was then attached to the stern section. Three months later, after the largest ship-rebuilding effort ever undertaken at the time, on 14 January 1908, the work on Suevic was completed and the vessel returned to service.

Whilst the rebuilding was underway, Suevic's master, Captain Jones, was found liable for her wrecking at the Court of Enquiry, and had his Certificate of Competency suspended for three months, although the trip had been his last before his retirement.

=== War service ===
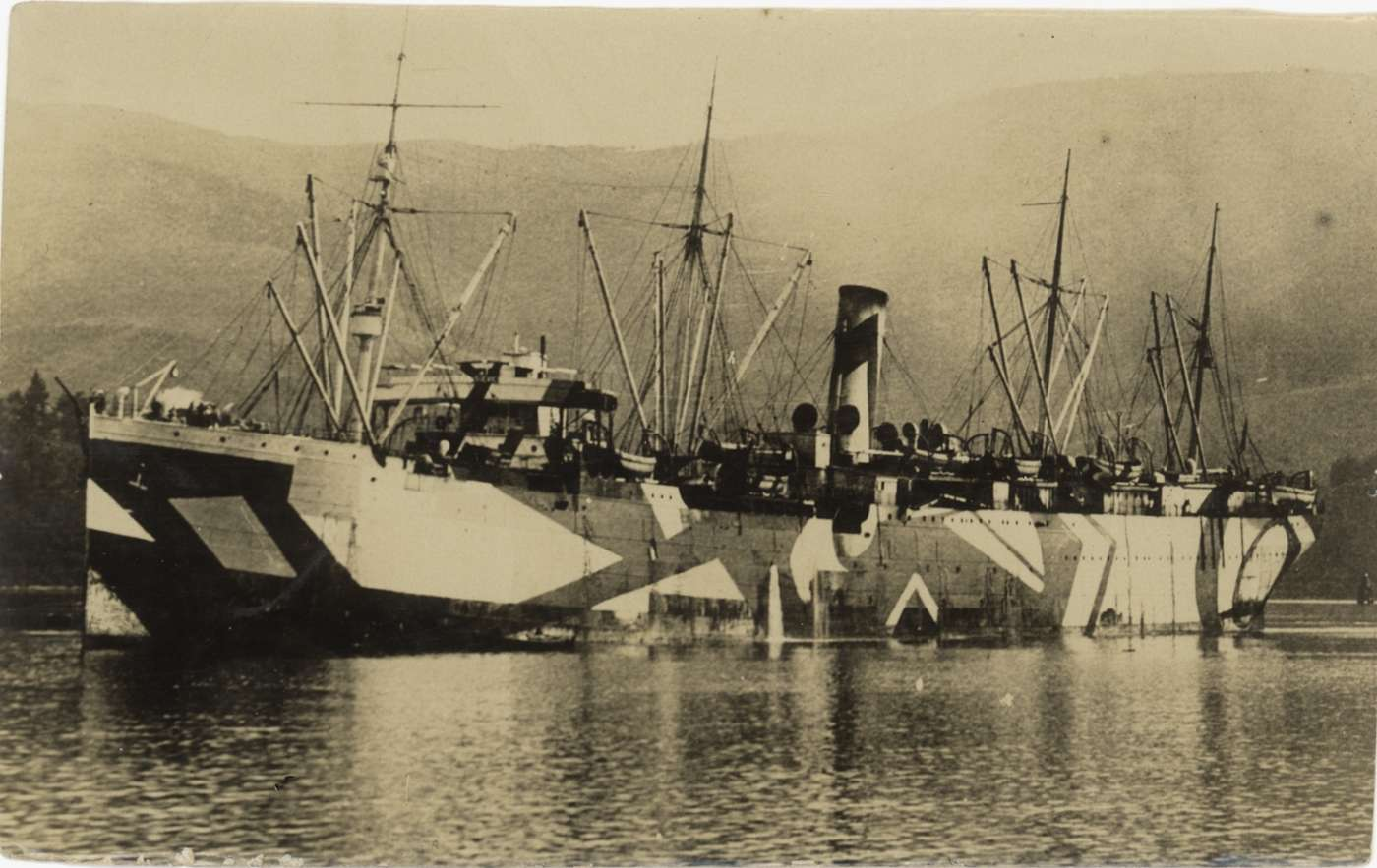
Suevic in dazzle camouflage while in war service

When the First World War began, many British ships were pressed into military service. The ability to carry frozen meat in their refrigerated holds meant that the Jubilee-class liners were left in commercial service so that they could bring provisions for the war effort, although they also carried troops on their normal route. Suevic did make one dedicated war run, in March 1915, carrying British troops to Moudros, as a part of the Dardanelles Campaign. From that point, until 1919, Suevic operated under the Royal Navy's Liner Requisition Scheme rather than under White Star management, although she continued on her commercial route to Australia.

In military service, Suevic was known as His Majesty's Australian Transport, HMAT A29 Suevic and made several journeys.

=== Post-war ===
Following the war, White Star refitted Suevic in 1920, modernising her passenger accommodation which was reconfigured to carry 266 second-class passengers, after which she returned to the Australian service with her remaining sisters Medic, Persic and Runic (her fourth sister Afric having been lost in the war). In March 1924, she completed her 50th voyage on that route. In the late-1920s White Star began withdrawing the Jubilee-class ships from service, Suevic continued in service with White Star until she was retired in 1928.

== As Skytteren ==
In October 1928, White Star sold her to Yngvar Hvistendahl's Finnhval A/S of Tønsberg, Norway for £35,000. She was renamed Skytteren and sent to Germaniawerft at Kiel to be converted into a whaling factory ship. The conversion involved the installation of a stern ramp, whereby whale carcasses could be hauled onto deck, and the installation of tanks with the capacity for 80,000 barrels of whale oil. Skytteren was then employed on the Antarctic whaling fleet.

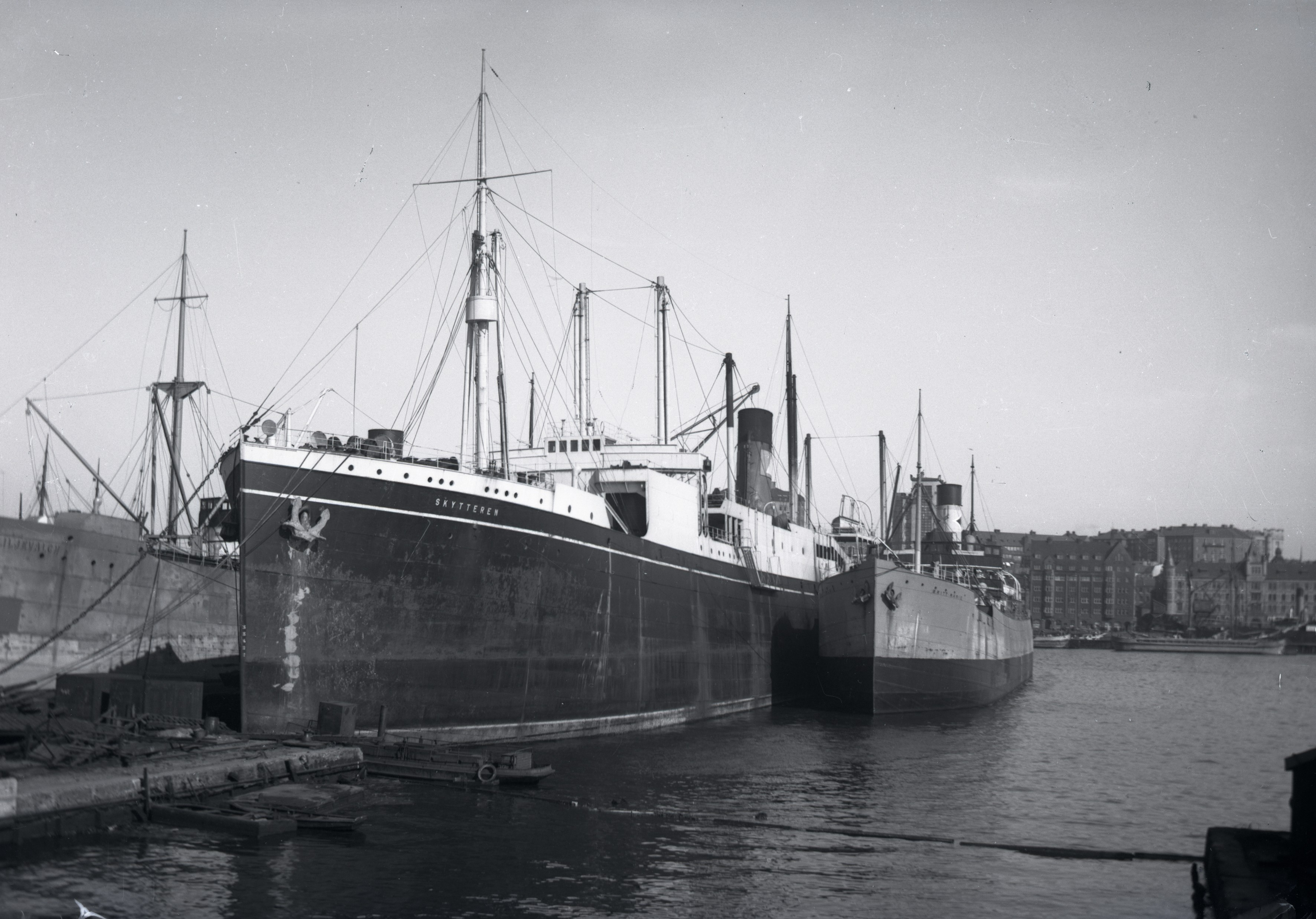
Skytteren in Gothenburg harbour at the beginning of the Second World War

When Germany invaded Norway in the Second World War, Skytteren was interned in the neutral port of Gothenburg, Sweden, with several other Norwegian ships in April 1940. The exiled Norwegian government claimed these ships as its property, which was contested by the collaborationist Nasjonal Samling government in occupied Norway. However, a court ruling favoured the exiled government's claim.

On 1 April 1942, ten Norwegian ships at Gothenburg made an attempt to escape into Allied-controlled waters, where they would be met and protected by a group of British warships. However, Sweden would not allow the Norwegian ships to use their neutral waters for this, and so Swedish ships steered the escapers towards international waters. The Germans, however, had been tipped off about the escape attempt and were lying in wait. Of the ten, only two made it through to the British, two turned back to Gothenburg, two were sunk by the Germans, and the remaining four, of which Skytteren was one, were scuttled by their crews after being confronted by German warships. Skytteren was scuttled in the waters off Måseskär, Sweden, with the loss of one crew member. The rest of her 111 strong crew were captured by the Germans and taken as prisoners of war.

=== Wreck ===
The wreck of Skytteren lies at a depth of around 70 metres (230 ft) at the position (58°09′30″N 11°11′40″E) lying starboard side up with her bow facing to the west. Skytteren was carrying a large amount of oil in her tanks when she sank. For several years after 2005, oil was observed to be leaking to the surface from the decaying wreck, leading to concerns about the potential environmental threat.

Further investigations of the wreck were carried out during 2018, 2020 and 2021, and then, during 2021-22 the Swedish Agency for Marine and Water Management successfully carried out a salvage operation, where they removed a total of 175,000 litres of oil and oil mixed with water from the wreck.
