= SS Naronic =

Cargo ship built for the White Star Line

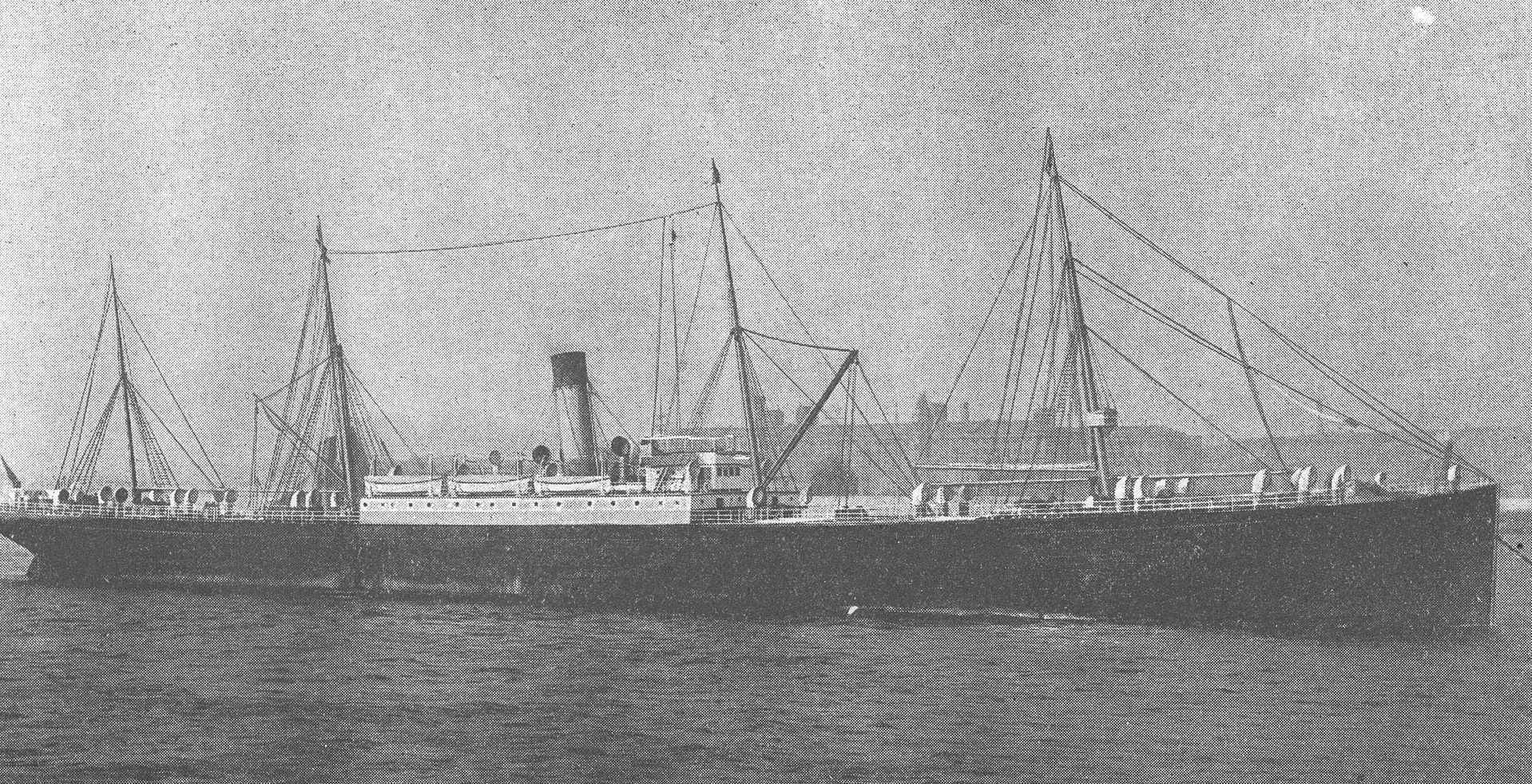
- SS Bovic, sister ship to Naronic; 1892. No known photographs exist of Naronic.

History

United Kingdom
- Name: Naronic
- Owner: White Star Line
- Builder: Harland and Wolff, Belfast, Ireland
- Yard number: 251
- Launched: 26 May 1892
- Completed: 11 July 1892
- Maiden voyage: 15 July 1892
- Out of service: February, 1893
- Fate: Missing 11 February 1893

General characteristics
- Type: Cargo liner
- Tonnage: 6,594 GRT
- Length: 470 ft (143.3 m)
- Beam: 53 ft (16.2 m)
- Decks: 3
- Installed power: Four steel boilers
- Propulsion: Twin reciprocating engines, twin propellers
- Speed: 13 knots (24.1 km/h)
- Capacity: 15 passengers
- Crew: 60

SS Naronic was a British cargo steamship built in 1892 by Harland and Wolff in Belfast, Ireland, for the White Star Line. A sister ship of SS Bovic, she was built at a time the company wanted to increase its market share in the transport of live cattle on the North Atlantic route. Along with other company's ships of the same type, she was responsible for transporting goods from Liverpool to New York City, United States, and bringing back American cattle on the return trip. She also had cabins that allowed her to carry a few passengers. At the time of her entry into service, Naronic was the largest cargo ship in operation.

On 11 February 1893, less than a year after her maiden voyage, Naronic went missing at sea during an east–west crossing of the Atlantic Ocean. The ship had departed without any problems being reported. However, at that time, there was no way for ships at sea to report possible incidents. Her wreck was never found, but soon after she went missing, two of her lifeboats were sighted by ships. The commission of inquiry formed to determine the causes of the sinking of Naronic found no explanation; tests carried out on her sister ship, the Bovic, proved that her stability was good; and no ice fields were reported on her route. Several hypotheses have been put forward, in particular that of a sinking following a storm or an explosion of chemicals transported in the hold of the ship.

The loss of Naronic killed 74 people. In the period following the disappearance of the ship, several bottles containing messages allegedly written during the sinking were found, but these were probably hoaxes. The cargo ship, although expensive, was not insured. The White Star Line replaced it in 1895 with a new and larger ship, the Georgic.

== Design ==
Naronic and her sister ship, the Bovic, were the largest freighters in service on their first crossings (a record which two other cattle carriers of the White Star Line, the Cevic and the Georgic, then succeed). Naronic was slightly larger than her sister ship and both measured 143.3 metres (470 feet) long by 16.2 metres (53 feet) wide. Their profiles reflected their primarily functional design with four masts surrounded by load cranes, and not able to carry sails, surrounding a single ochre funnel with black top, the colours of the company. The hull, made of steel as on all of the company's ships since the 1880s, was black. Powered by two propellers driven by triple expansion machines, Naronic travelled at an average speed of 13 knots. For this, she consumed an average of 50 tonnes of coal per day, and could carry 1,193 tonnes in her bunkers.

The ship was, above all, designed to transport cattle in good conditions, as described in the Marine Engineer magazine when she was put into service:

Her spacious facilities designed to accommodate 1,050 animals, which she will transport on her main deck and her upper deck, will include all the improvements that the greatest consideration and the best experience can suggest. The barns, fresh water supply, and ventilation will be unmatched.

Cattle were transported from New York, and these facilities remained unused on the return crossing, although occasionally the ship did transport a few animals such as racehorses and circus animals. A few cabins were also provided for transporting passengers, generally people accompanying the cattle. Paying passengers were very rare. Although the facilities could accommodate fifteen people in practice, the ship was certified to carry twelve.

== History ==
=== Origin ===
In the mid-1880s, the White Star Line abandoned the use of sailing ships in order to concentrate on steamships. The company then began to look for new outlets and quickly turned to transporting cattle from the United States. This trade had taken off in 1874, when the first cargo ship, the Europe, landed 370 head of cattle in England. Fifteen years later, in 1889, 450,000 animals crossed the North Atlantic. The entry of the White Star Line into this new business took place in 1888 when it put into service the Cufic, followed the following year by the Runic.

The White Star Line then set itself a goal: to transport goods on board these ships to the US and bring back cattle on the return trip, in the best possible conditions. It was indeed not uncommon on contemporary ships that the animals perished because of travel conditions and mistreatment, causing financial loss to the owner. The company therefore explicitly asked captains to ensure the good health of the animals. The two ships quickly brought success and, in 1891, the company put into service two new larger carriers, the Nomadic and the Tauric. Two new, larger ships were built the following year, the Naronic and the Bovic.

When Naronic was launched on 26 May 1892, and completed on 11 July 1892, she was then the largest steam cargo ship in the world, with her 143 metres length and her 6,594 GRT. More than a thousand animals and several thousand tons of goods could travel on board, as well as about fifteen passengers (generally the people accompanying the animals). Her price of £121,685 made her a relatively expensive ship for the time. On 15 July 1892, Naronic began her maiden voyage between Liverpool and New York under the command of a Captain Thompson. Bovic was put into service a few weeks later, on August 26.

=== Brief career and disappearance ===
In November 1892, Captain Thompson was replaced by William Roberts, former commander of the Adriatic. The ship continued to operate between Liverpool and New York. This early career was only disturbed by one incident: on 27 November 1892, despite the good conditions for transporting the animals, Naronic arrived in Liverpool having lost 34 animals. On 11 February 1893, Naronic left the port of Liverpool with sixty crew members on board, including several officers and mechanics who had served on board since her entry into service. The ship also carried fourteen passengers, who had accompanied the cattle, back to the US as well as 2,876 tons of goods. As usual in this direction, the ship did not transport cattle for the crossing, but had on board two horses, as well as several cages of live pigeons and chickens. The ship was carrying enough coal to make a round trip. After leaving Liverpool, she stopped briefly at Point Lynas, Anglesey, North Wales, to put her pilot ashore before heading west into heavy seas, never to be seen again.

Like all ships of the time, Naronic had no wireless set or wireless operators in order to send a distress call; it would be another seven years before the Marconi International Marine Communication Company was founded and a ship would have a wireless set installed. (Note: The SS Kaiser Wilhelm der Grosse of the Norddeutscher Lloyd Line in 1900 was the first ship with a wireless while the RMS Lucania of the Cunard Line was the first British ship to be fitted with one, in 1901.) Hence, in the event of damage or shipwreck in the open sea, they could only count on luck, that is to say, the passage of a nearby ship. The crossing of Naronic was supposed to last ten days, and no one was worried immediately, especially since delays were frequent. It was common for ships to lose a propeller or their machinery to break down. What was more, the strong storms that raged in February 1893 slowed down several ships. It took several weeks for the concern to begin to emerge in the US, but the White Star Line was then reassuring, recalling the high quality of the ship. On 1 March, the company said there was no cause for concern. A week later, a journalist reported new comments from the company: “They think she's afloat and have every reason to hope she's safe. They stress that the ship is recent, built with watertight compartments, well equipped, handled and commanded by the best officers in the Atlantic”. It was not until the following 13 March that the company declared: "There is now great concern about the ship."

Steps were taken to locate Naronic. On 14 March the Tauric arrived in New York. The additional lookouts, which had been posted during the crossing to discover traces of the missing ship, saw nothing. The next day, the captain of the Teutonic arrived in Queenstown, County Cork, Ireland, declaring that he had diverted his route south in the hope of finding Naronic, but to no avail. Having had, moreover, confirmation that the ship was not in the Azores, the White Star Line resigned itself to declaring on 15 March: "We still hope that it can be safe, but it is unlikely that it will be found, because the Atlantic is crisscrossed by steamers and sailboats, and it would certainly have been spotted if it had still been afloat". Rumours began to circulate in the press, according to which the ship was carrying hundreds of emigrants, which the company quickly denied. The most optimistic note was that if the ship was adrift, the passengers would have had, thanks to the cargo, provisions for several months.

On 19 March, new information was released: the British steamer SS Coventry reported seeing two of Naronic's empty lifeboats 500 miles east of Halifax, Nova Scotia; the first lifeboat, found at 2:00 am on 4 March, was capsized and the second, found at 2:00 pm, was swamped. In the months following the disappearance of the ship, hoaxes and rumours began to circulate: several messages in bottles supposedly written by members of the crew of Naronic, were recovered from both sides of the Atlantic, but their authenticity was too doubtful to be taken seriously. The American press hypothesized that Naronic could have been sabotaged with on-board explosives; a cargo of this type would indeed have been discovered on Tauric. This rumour did not last long as Tauric's explosives turned out to be just fireworks.

== Following the disappearance ==
=== Inquiry and hypotheses ===
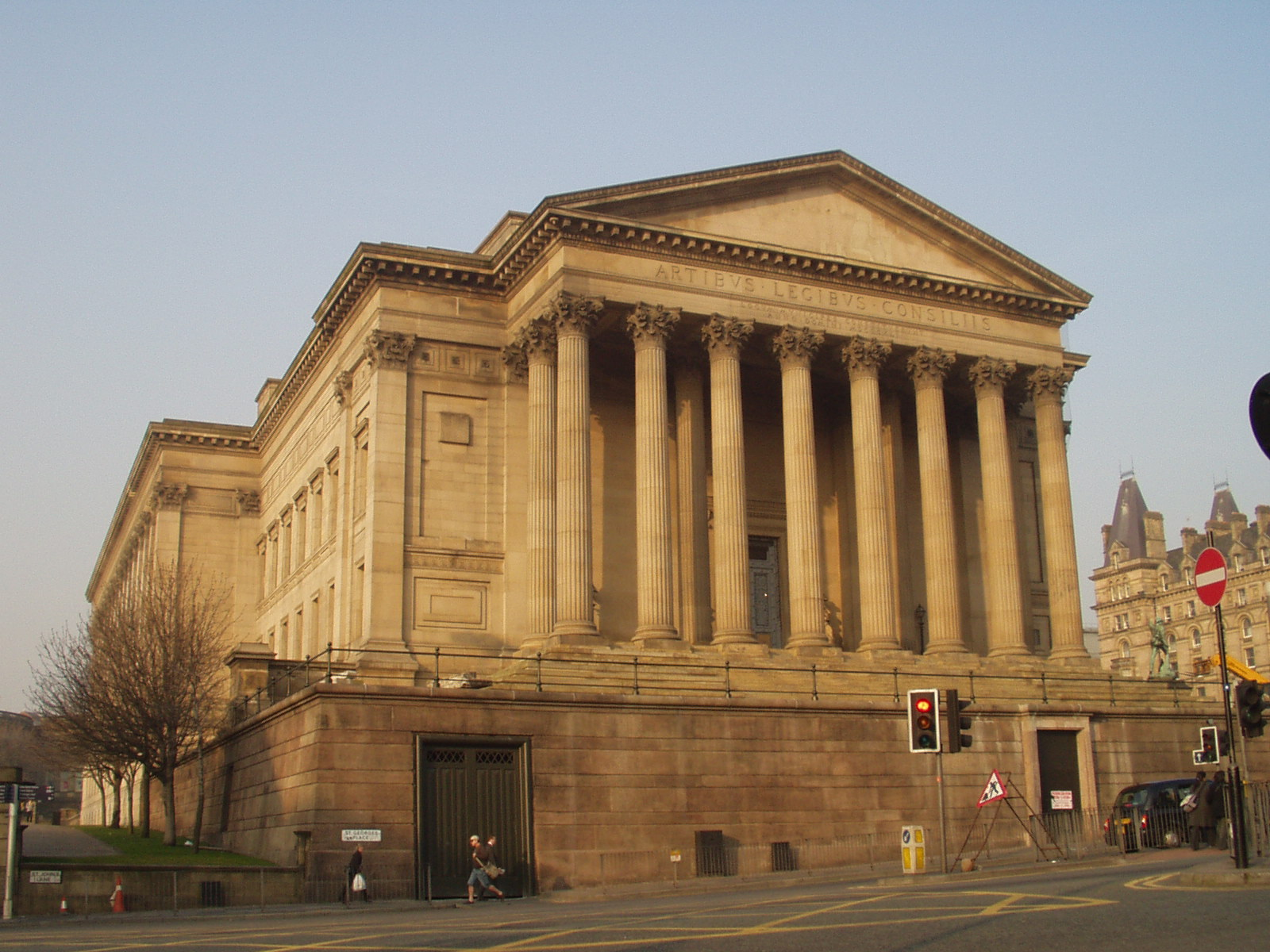
St. George's Hall, Liverpool, where the official inquiry into the disappearance took place

In addition to the 74 casualties, the disappearance of Naronic caused a net loss for the White Star Line, which had not insured the ship that was worth £121,685. However, as early as 1894 another cattle transporter replaced it, the Cevic, which was much larger, and another one was ordered to compensate for the loss, the Georgic, which was put into service in 1895. Insurers had to reimburse the cargo, which was valued at £61,855. The shock was also difficult for the families of the sixty British sailors and the fourteen American passengers. The wives of two crew members were sent to asylum due to trauma.

In June 1893, when hopes of recovering the ship had vanished, a commission of inquiry was convened at the initiative of the Board of Trade at St George's Hall, Liverpool. It was a priority of the investigation to refute a rumour created in the press. An inhabitant of Pittsburgh, Pennsylvania, claiming to be the brother of a ship's mechanic, had indeed declared having received a letter from the latter declaring that the boilers were in very poor condition and threatened the safety of Naronic. After investigating this matter, the commission concluded: “The machines and boilers were described by the inspector of the Board of Trade as being the best, and as having been installed at best… The machines are not only the best in their category, but were also maintained on each trip.”

Other rumours were that Naronic capsized after being caught in a storm. Experiments were carried out on her sister ship, the Bovic, and showed that the ship was very stable, even when loaded. Captain Thompson, then captain of Bovic, who had also commanded Naronic during its first three-round trips, confirmed that, even in the storm, the ship never seemed to him to be unstable. Two of the letters found in bottles evoked a collision with an iceberg, and certain ships had spotted ice in the North Atlantic in February 1893. This led the commission to also examine this a hypothesis that the ship hit an iceberg. The ship's course, estimated with the help of Captain Thompson, however, passed well south of Newfoundland, and investigation concluded that Naronic was at least 100 miles from the nearest ice. This conclusion was however questionable, with the New York press reporting at the time that several ships reported ice in this region. After evaluating the safety of the vessel, the commission recognized its powerlessness, and declared: "Unless new elements are provided, the probable cause of the loss of the vessel remains a matter of speculation and adds to the mysteries of the sea."

Naronic's cargo list, published in the New York Herald in March 1893, included several chemicals (acids, potassium chlorate, sodium sulphide, calcium hypochlorite). Under certain conditions, these products could have caused an explosion resulting in the sinking of Naronic if the storm had displaced them or freed them from their bottles, which led historians John P. Eaton and Charles A. Haas to evoke a century later this hypothesis which had not been considered by the official inquiry. In October 1893, a newspaper reported the testimony of the captain of the Norwegian ship Emblem, who declared to have spotted in July a lifeboat of Naronic, floating upside down and covered with barnacles. Everything seemed to indicate that the boat was hastily prepared, confirming the hypothesis of a rapid and sudden sinking.

=== Messages in bottles ===
Four bottles with messages inside, which were recovered later, that claimed to have been written while Naronic was sinking. Two of the bottles were found in the US, one on 3 March in Bay Ridge, Brooklyn, New York, and one in Ocean View, Virginia, on 30 March. A third bottle was found in June 1893 in the Irish Channel, and the fourth was found on September 18 in the River Mersey near the ship's point of departure, Liverpool. While all four specifically mention Naronic sinking, the second bottle found contained the most detailed message:

3:10 AM Feb.19. SS Naronic at sea. To who picks this up: report when you find this to our agents if not heard of before, that our ship is sinking fast beneath the waves. It's such a storm that we can never live in the small boats. One boat has already gone with her human cargo below. God let all of us live through this. We were struck by an iceberg in a blinding snowstorm and floated two hours. Now it 3:20 AM by my watch and the great ship is dead level with the sea. Report to the agents at Broadway, New New York, M. Kersey & Company. Goodby all.

It was signed "John Olsen, Cattleman"; however, there was no one with this name listed on the ship's manifest, the closest being John O'Hara and John Watson. A similar situation exists with the first bottle found, in that the signature, "L. Winsel", is also not on the manifest, the closest being crew member John L. Watson. The third bottle, which was found in the Irish Channel said Naronic had struck an iceberg and was sinking fast. It was signed "Young", which also does not appear on crew list. The fourth one was signed just "T". with the closest being William Tobin or Christopher Tesch. Because of the unidentified names signed on the papers, the reliability of the bottles as genuine testaments to the ship's fate has been questioned and the Court of Inquiry into the incident did not accept the bottled notes as genuine. If the messages were legitimate, the ship sank sometime after 3:20 a.m on 19 February 1893.

== Bibliography ==
- Anderson, Roy Claude (1964). White Star. Prescot: T. Stephenson & Sons Ltd. OCLC 3134809.
- de Kerbrech, Richard (2009). Ships of the White Star Line. Shepperton: Ian Allan Publishing. ISBN 978-0-7110-3366-5.
- Eaton, John; Haas, Charles (1989). Falling Star, Misadventures of White Star Line Ships. Patrick Stephens Ltd. ISBN 1-85260-084-5.
- Haws, Duncan (1990). White Star Line. Merchant Fleets. Vol. 17. Hereford: TCL Publications. ISBN 0-946378-16-9. OCLC 50214776.
