= SS Tropic =

SS Tropic may refer to:

- SS Tropic (1871), launched in 1871, renamed Frederico in 1873 and scrapped in 1894
- SS Tropic (1904), launched in 1896 as European, renamed Tropic in 1904, Artico in 1924, Transilvania in 1927 and scrapped in 1933
