= SS Cufic =

Several ships have borne the name SS Cufic:

- SS Cufic (1888) was a livestock carrier launched in 1889 at Harland and Wolff for the White Star Line. Later she changed ownership and was renamed Manxman, she foundered in 1919.
- SS Cufic (1904) was a cargo liner launched in 1895 at Harland and Wolff for the West India and Pacific Steamship Company. Originally known as American she was sold to the White Star Line in 1904 and renamed Cufic. She later passed to Italian ownership in 1924 and was renamed the Antartico, and then Maria Guilia until being scrapped in 1932.
