= SS Atlantic (1870) =

Transatlantic liner, sank disastrously 1873

Coordinates: 44°26′31″N 63°43′55″W

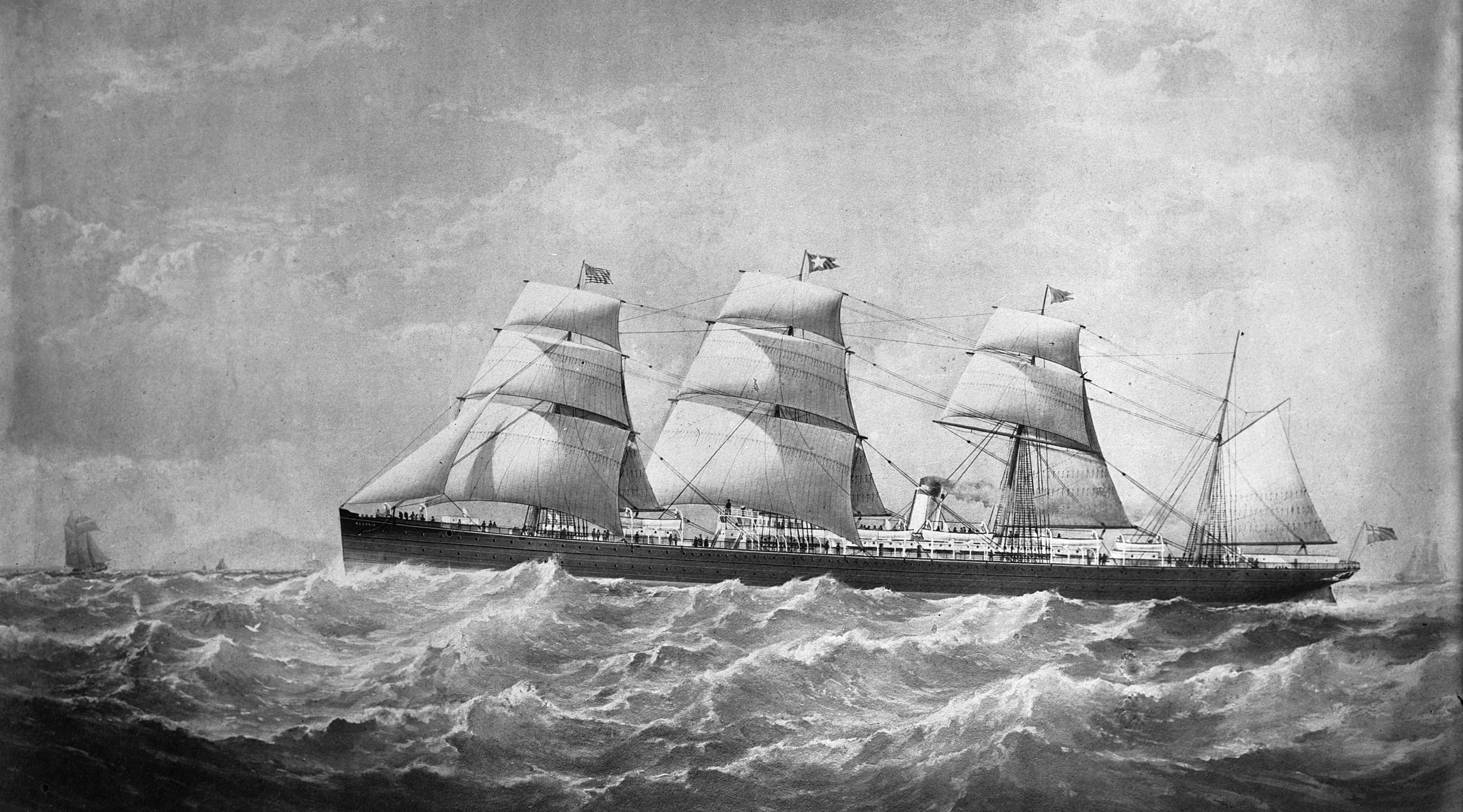
- Painting of SS Oceanic, identical sister to Atlantic

History

United Kingdom
- Name: Atlantic
- Namesake: Atlantic Ocean
- Owner: Oceanic Steam Navigation Company
- Operator: White Star Line
- Port of registry: Liverpool
- Builder: Harland and Wolff, Belfast; Engines by George Forrester and Company, Liverpool
- Yard number: 74
- Laid down: 1870
- Launched: 26 November 1870
- Completed: 3 June 1871
- Maiden voyage: 8 June 1871
- In service: 8 June 1871
- Out of service: 1 April 1873
- Home port: Liverpool
- Fate: Sank after collision with Atlantic Rock, Lower Prospect, Nova Scotia, on 1 April 1873
- Notes: The second ship built for the White Star Line after being acquired by Thomas Ismay

General characteristics
- Class & type: Oceanic-class ocean liner
- Type: Ocean liner
- Tonnage: 3,707 tons
- Length: 128.4 m (421.3 ft)
- Beam: 12.4 m (40.7 ft)
- Depth: 9.58 m (31.4 ft)
- Decks: 4
- Installed power: 1 compound steam engine powering a central drive shaft producing 1,990 ihp (1,480 kW)
- Propulsion: Single propeller, sail
- Sail plan: Four-masted barque
- Speed: 14.5 knots (26.9 km/h)
- Boats & landing craft carried: 10 lifeboats
- Capacity: Approximately 160 saloon (1st) class and 1000 in steerage
- Crew: 166

SS Atlantic was a transatlantic ocean liner of the White Star Line, and second ship of the Oceanic-class. The ship operated between Liverpool, United Kingdom, and New York City, United States.

During the ship's 19th voyage, on 1 April 1873, she struck rocks and sank off the coast of Nova Scotia, Canada, killing at least 535 people. It remained the deadliest civilian maritime disaster in the North Atlantic Ocean until the sinking of the La Bourgogne on 4 July 1898 and the greatest disaster for the White Star Line prior to the sinking of the Titanic on 15 April 1912.

== History ==
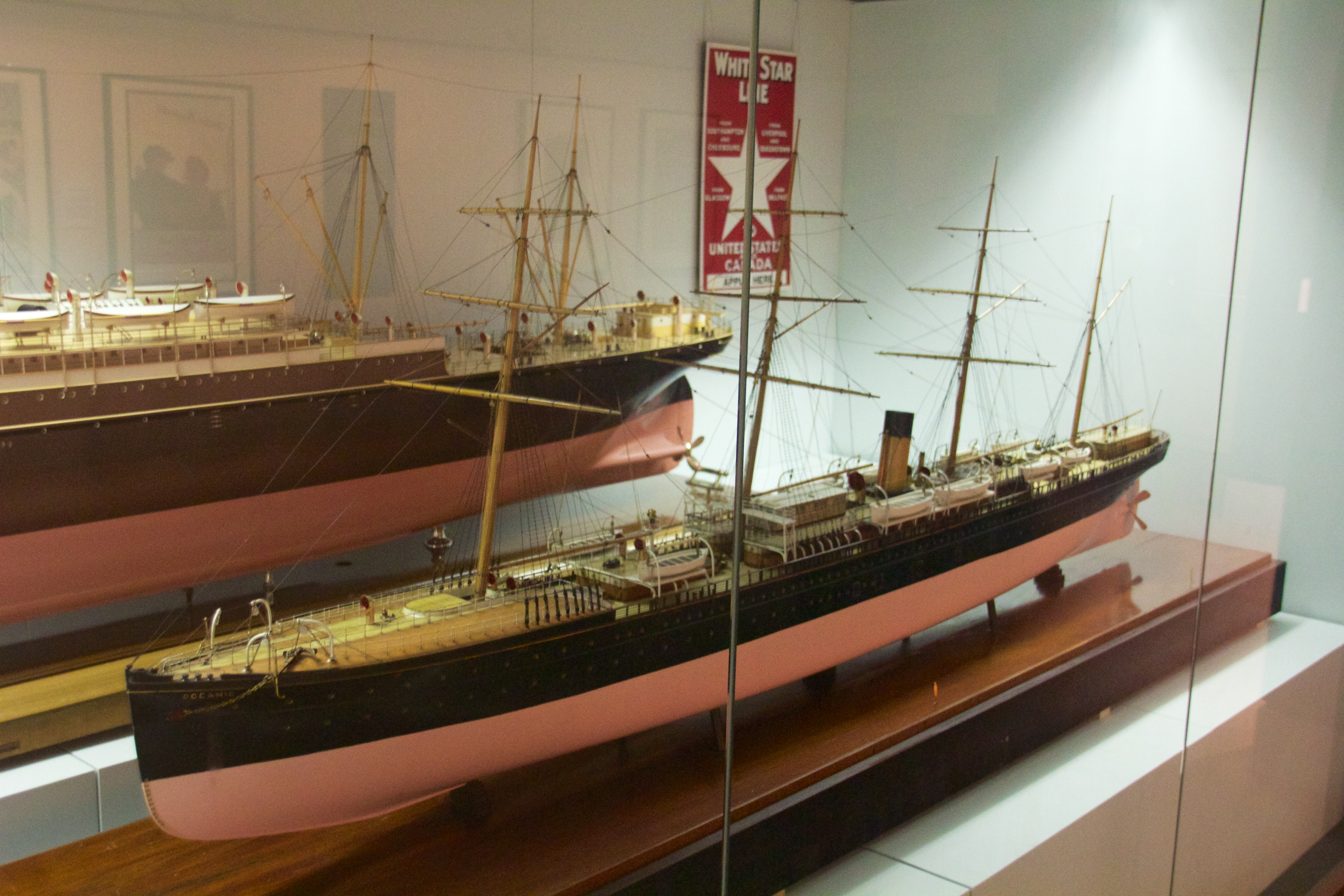
Builders model of Atlantic's identical sister ship Oceanic

Atlantic was built by Harland and Wolff in Belfast in 1870, as one of the four Oceanic-class liners. The other vessels were Republic, Oceanic and Baltic. She was the second ship of the class. The four liners were built for the newly created Oceanic Steam Navigation Company, commonly referred to as the White Star Line. Her primary propulsion was a four-cylinder compound condensing steam engine producing 1,990 indicated horsepower (1,480 kW) driving a single propeller giving her a speed of 14 knots (26 km/h; 16 mph). The engines were made by George Forrester and Company at the Vauxhall foundry, Liverpool. To communicate from the bridge to the engine room she was fitted with a telegraph. Steering was by Forrester's steam steering apparatus, as fitted to Great Eastern.

For auxiliary propulsion she was rigged as a four-masted barque. With a length of 420 feet (130 m) between perpendiculars (437 feet (133 m) overall) and a beam of 41 feet (12 m), she was slim with an aspect ratio of 1:10. Atlantic had a depth of hold of 32 feet (9.8 m) and was 3,707 tons register. She had three decks and five bulkheads extending from keelson to maindeck.

The four sister ships were luxurious with a standard unseen on any previous vessel. Two classes of accommodation were available. Cabin class was amidships with a saloon measuring 80 feet (24 m) long and the full 40 feet (12 m) of the ship's beam. The staterooms were forward of the saloon with provision for four berth en suite accommodation as well as double cabins. The lavatories were provided with running water and the bathrooms had water heated by steam when required. Cabin class passengers were free to come on deck. There was also provision for 1,000 steerage passengers. Single males were housed forward of the cabin class area, aft of cabin class was reserved for single females and married couples. Steerage class passengers did not have access to the decks.

She sailed for New York City on her maiden voyage on 8 June 1871. For her return trip (starting on 1 July 1871) she was advertised for all classes as being "unrivalled in safety, speed and comfort". She carried "surgeons and stewardesses". Atlantic completed 18 crossings with no problems other than a minor incident on 23 November 1871, when she was hit by SS Alexandria.

== Sinking ==
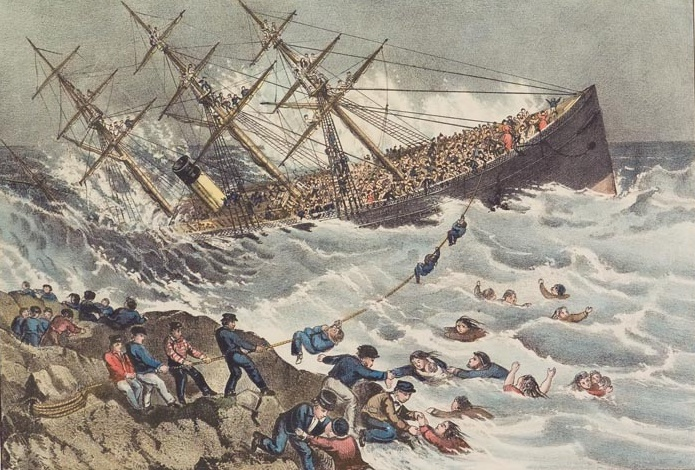
Currier and Ives lithograph of the disaster

=== Concern over coal ===
On 20 March 1873, Atlantic departed on her 19th voyage from Liverpool with 636 passengers and 141 crew; another 175 passengers joined the ship at Queenstown, which meant that there were officially 952 people on board, although there may have been up to 14 stowaways. En route, the ship encountered heavy seas and gale force headwinds, which slowed her progress to a crawl. The ship's engines had to work harder than normal to maintain forward progress, and this resulted in increased coal consumption. The captain, James Williams, became increasingly concerned that they would run out of coal for the boilers before reaching New York. They in fact had more than enough remaining fuel, but unbeknownst to the captain, the ship's engineer John Foxley had been deliberately under-reporting coal reserves in order to err on the side of caution and encourage economical use of the remaining reserves, which was a common practice on ships at the time. On the 11th day of the voyage, Foxley gave an estimate to the captain that there were 129 tons of coal remaining, when at least 140 tons would have been needed for the two days sailing to New York, some 460 miles (740 km) away, consuming 70 tons per day. Foxley was aware that this figure was an underestimate, but did not wish to admit that his previous estimations had been inaccurate. Thus convinced they were short of coal—and unable to hoist sail as a backup because of the strong headwind—the captain decided to divert to Halifax, Nova Scotia, to refuel, as this was much closer (170 miles (270 km) distant) and it was a common practice for ships low on coal reserves to call there, although this was the first time that a White Star ship had attempted to do so, and none of the ship's mates had any firsthand knowledge of the approaches to Halifax harbour.

=== Diversion to Halifax ===
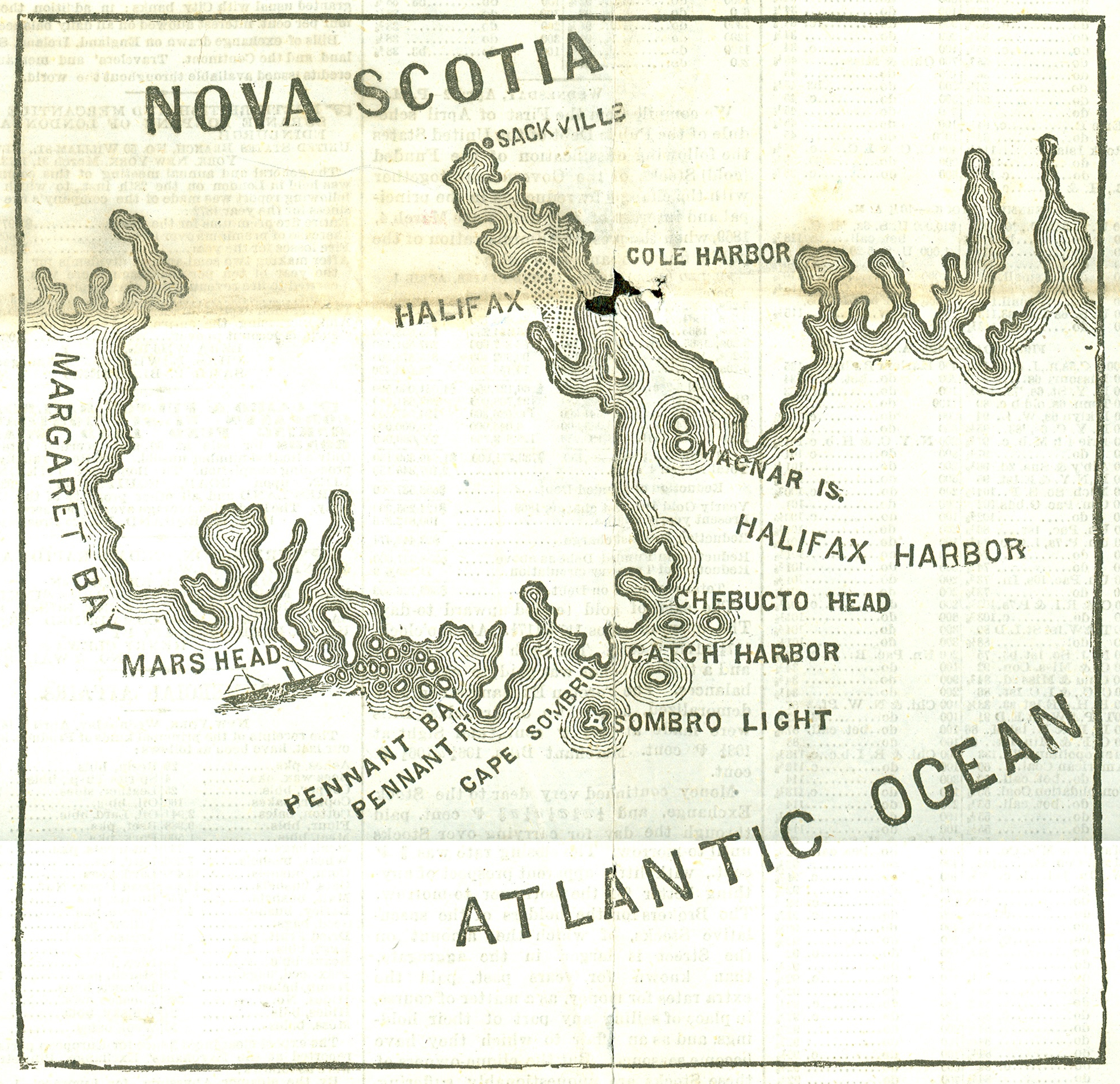
Contemporary map of the location of the wreck relative to Halifax

During the approach to Halifax on the evening of 31 March, the captain and third officer were on the bridge until midnight while Atlantic made her way through a storm, proceeding at 12 knots (22 km/h; 14 mph) for the entrance of Halifax Harbour, experiencing intermittent visibility and heavy seas. Unbeknownst to the crew or passengers, winds and currents had put Atlantic 12.5 miles (20.1 km) off-course to the west of the harbour. On the approach to harbour, Captain Williams decided to sleep, and put the ship in command of the Second Mate Henry Ismay Metcalfe, with instruction that he be awoken at 3 am. It had been the captain's intention for the ship to heave to until daylight after 3 am; however, his instruction to be woken was not carried out. Because almost none of the crew had ever been to Halifax before, they were unaware of the dangers of the approach; no one took soundings, posted a masthead lookout, or reduced speed, as they approached the unfamiliar coast. Because they were so far off-course, they did not spot the Sambro Lighthouse, the large landfall lighthouse which warns sailors of the rocky shoals to the west of the harbour entrance. As the night wore on without any sight of the lighthouse, the ship's quartermaster Robert Thomas—the only crew member familiar with Halifax—became convinced that something was wrong, especially when the lighthouse did not come into view. He relayed his concerns to both Metcalfe, and the Fourth Mate John Brown, and advised that the ship should heave to. However, the officers dismissed his concerns.

=== Striking the rocks ===
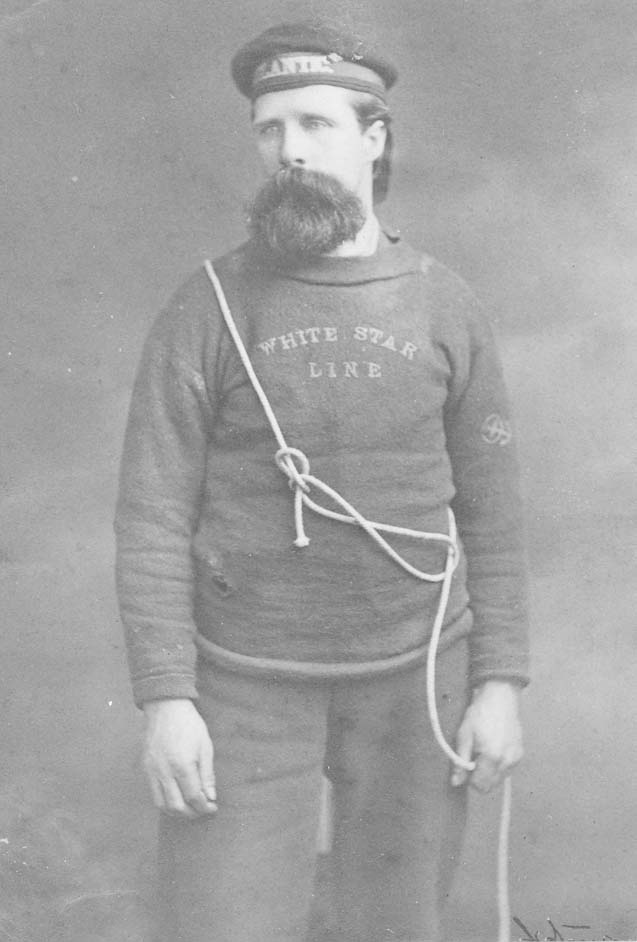
Quartermaster John Speakman led a number of survivors ashore by swimming to nearby rocks with a rope, creating a link from the vessel to land

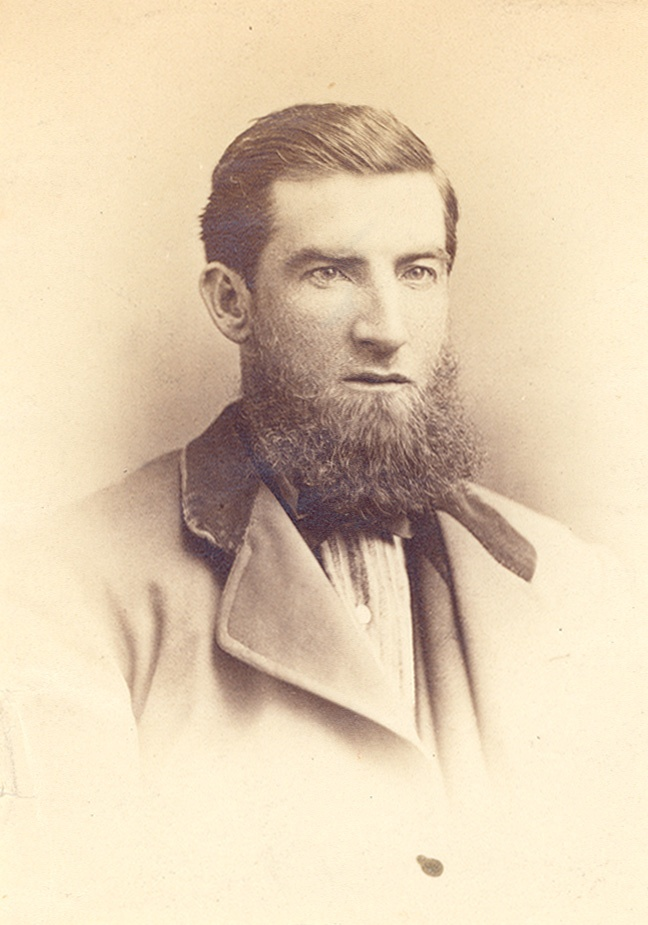
Cornelius Brady, Third Officer, risked his life to save the passengers and crew of the Atlantic

At 3:15 a.m. local time on 1 April 1873, the lookout spotted the white foam of breaking waves and shouted "Breakers ahead! Breakers ahead!". The crew immediately attempted to take evasive action and place the engines into reverse. However, these measures were insufficient, and Atlantic struck an underwater rock off Marr's Head, Meagher's Island (now Marrs Head, Marrs Island), Nova Scotia. Atlantic rode up onto the rocky ledge at near full speed, coming to a complete stop, and was pounded on the rocks several times, shattering some iron hull plates, before slipping backward and heeling to starboard. The ship rapidly began to fill with water, partially capsizing, gradually settling on the shallow seabed, and heeling over to an ever-increasing angle. All 10 lifeboats were lowered by the crew but were all washed away or smashed against rocks. Distress rockets were fired into the air every minute, but this did not bring any results. Many of the disaster victims were trapped inside the ship as it filled with water. Part of the ship remained above the water, where it was pounded by waves, and many of those who made their way out onto the deck clung to the ship for as long as they could, but were eventually swept away by the waves washing over it; one passenger reported seeing a mass of heads in the water so dense that he thought it was cargo floating in the sea. Others climbed up onto the rigging and clung on as long as they could; however, most of these were overcome by exposure and eventually died there or fell into the sea.

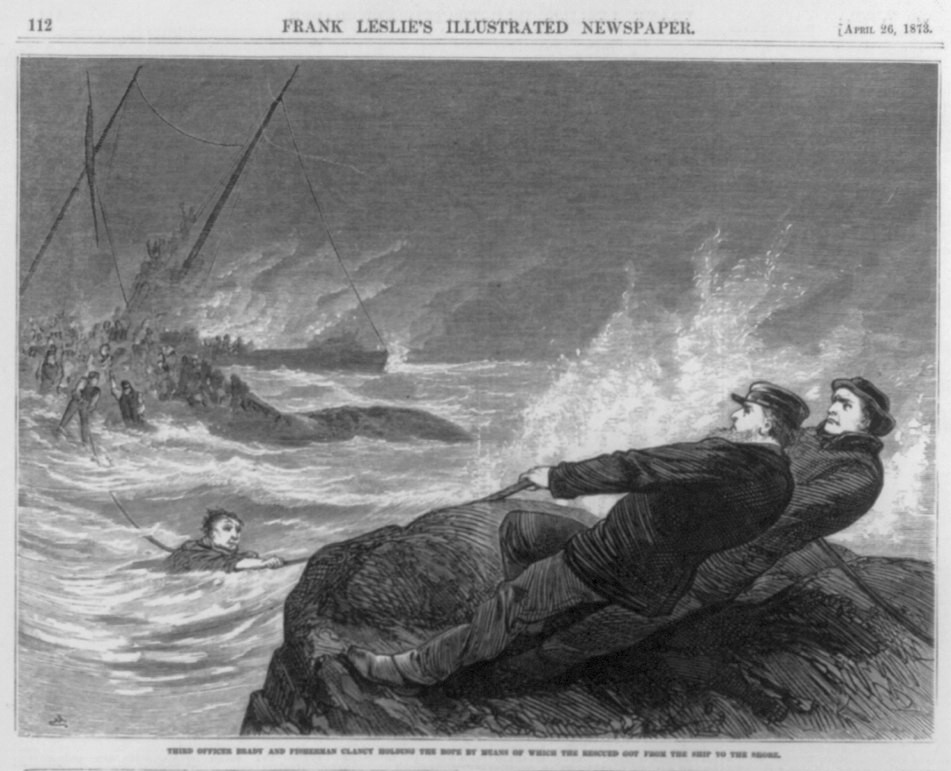
Contemporary illustration of the rescue effort

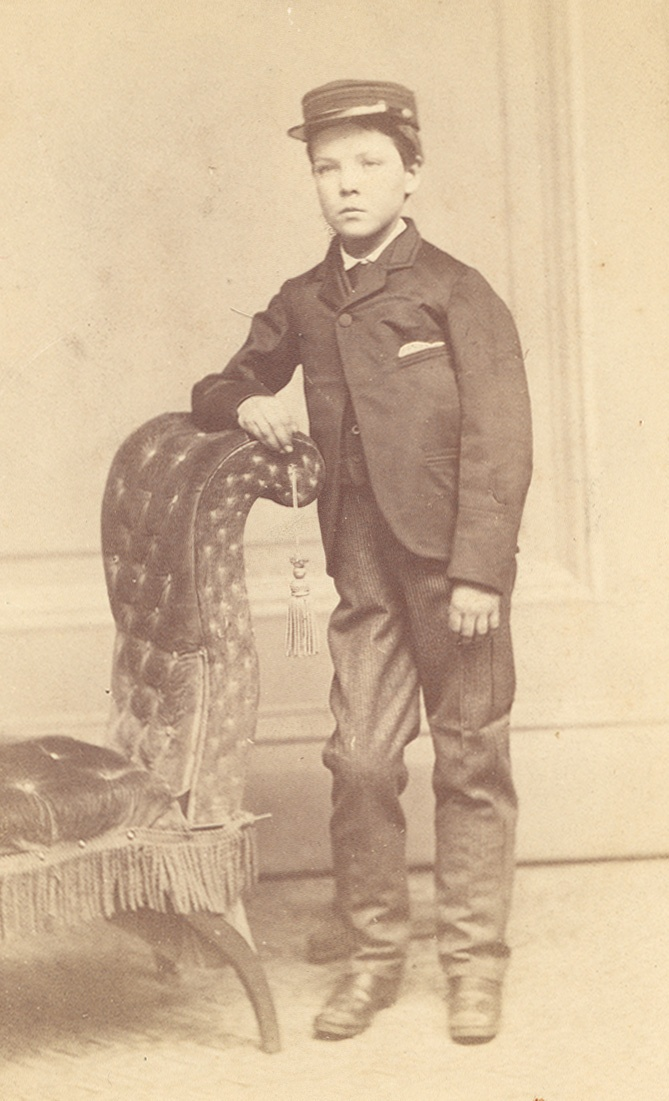
John Hindley, the only child who survived the Atlantic disaster

Many people survived due to the bravery of the Third Mate, Cornelius Brady, and the quartermasters John Speakman and Edward Owens, who swam to shore with a rope and rigged up lines, via a rock to the shore. By dawn, five such lines had been rigged, creating a link from the ship to land, and this was responsible for saving many lives. Many of those who survived swam or climbed the ropes, first to a wave-swept rock and then to a barren shore. By 6 am, Brady had made contact with the local residents of the tiny fishing villages of Lower Prospect and Terence Bay, and they sent out three boats to rescue people from the rock and those who remained clinging to the ship itself. The rescue operation continued until midday when all still alive had been rescued.

However, at least 535 people died, leaving only 429 survivors. The ship's manifest indicates that of the 952 aboard, 156 were women and 189 were children (including two who had been born during the voyage). All women and children perished except for one twelve-year-old boy, John Hindley. Ten crew members were lost, while 131 survived. This was the worst civilian loss of life in the North Atlantic until the wreck of La Bourgogne on 2 July 1898.

=== Aftermath ===
==== Recovery of the dead ====
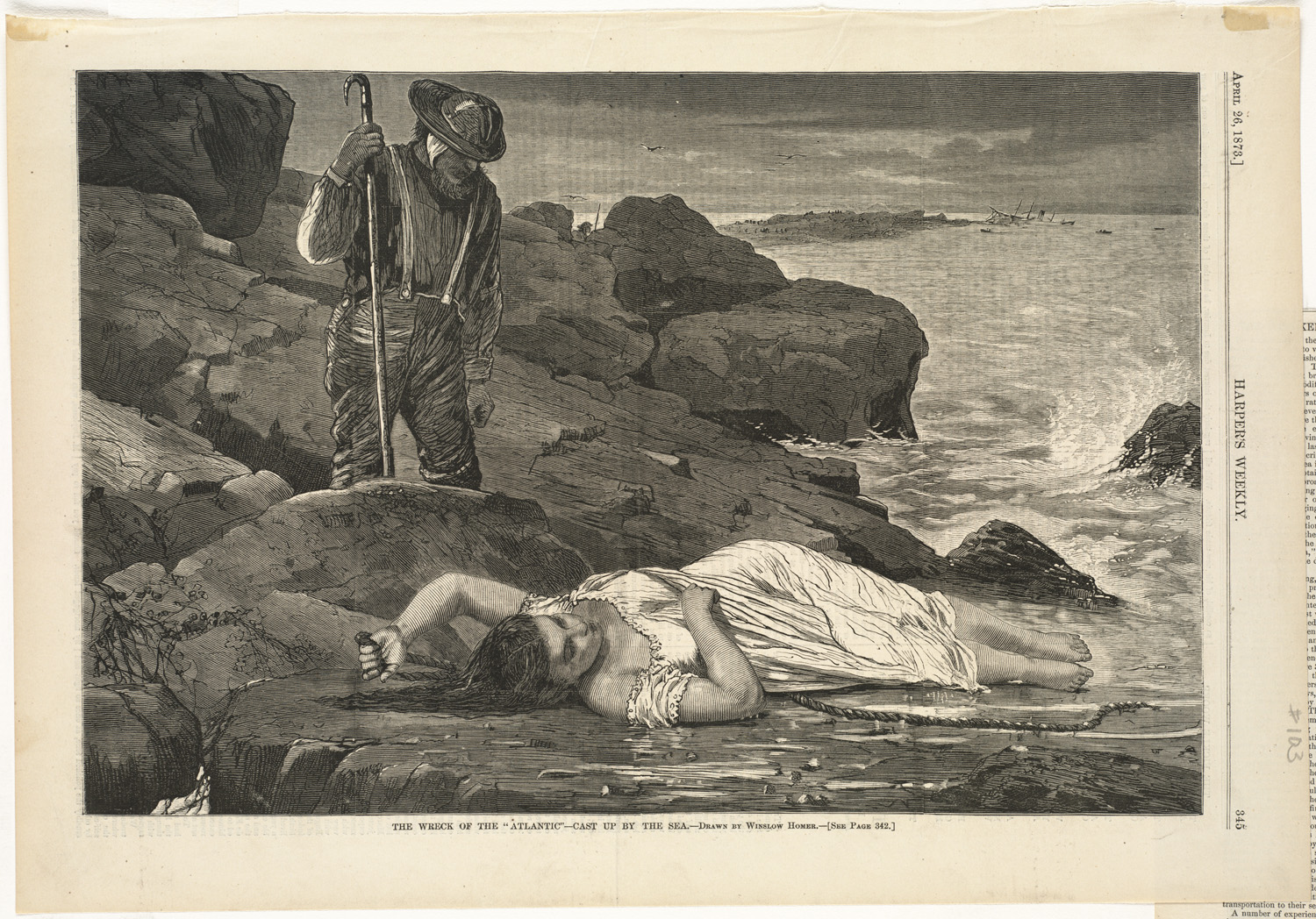
Winslow Homer drawing of an Atlantic victim cast up by the sea

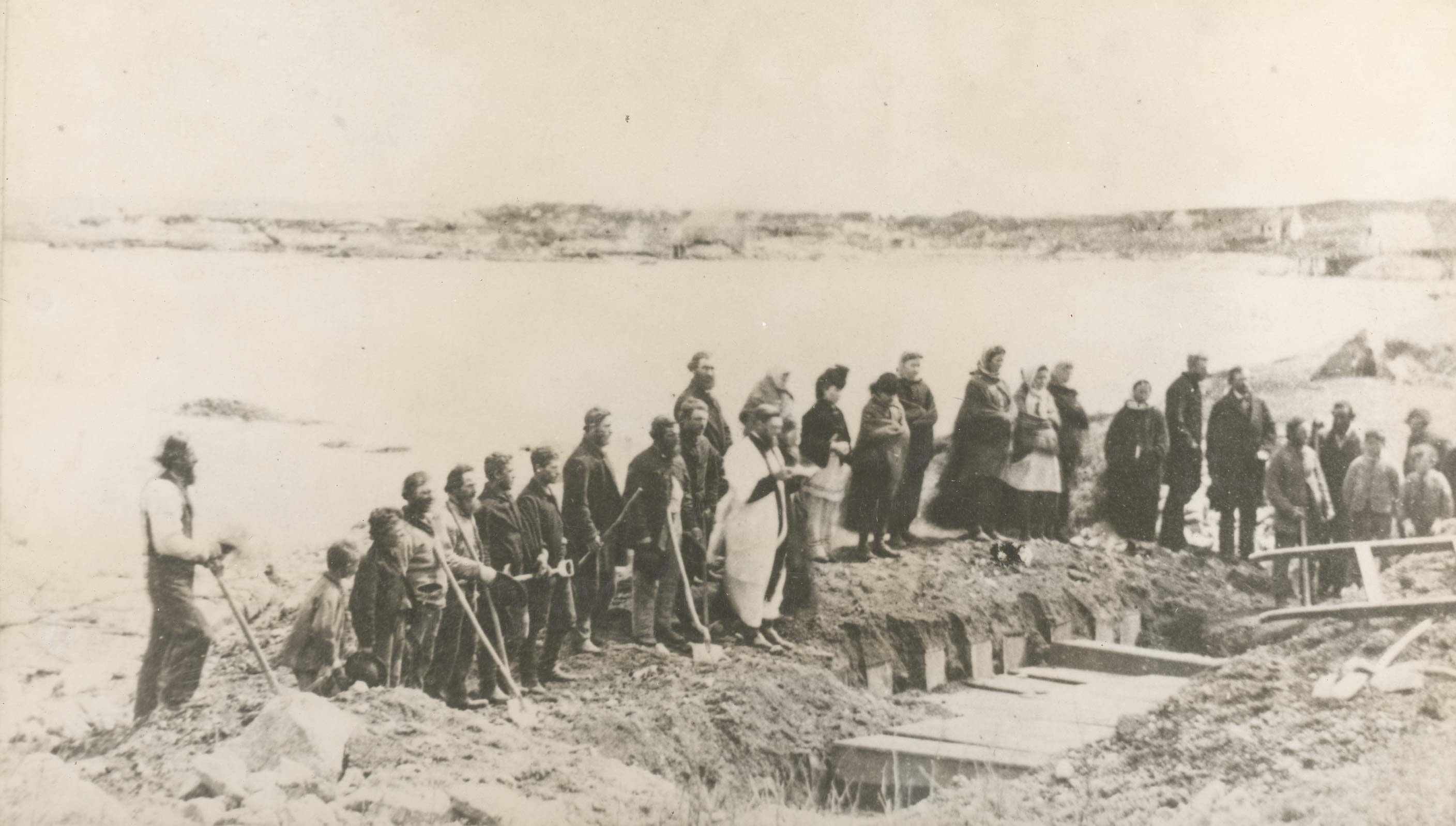
Burial service for victims of Atlantic shipwreck, April 1873, Lower Prospect, Halifax County, N.S.

Recovery and burial of the large numbers of victims took weeks. Divers were paid rewards for recovering the many bodies trapped within the hull. A diving company from New York sent equipment to the wreckage to salvage as much as possible of ship and cargo, and to recover the bodies of the drowned. On 11 May 1873, the Norwegian newspaper Morgenbladet reported that they had blown open the wreck, and had recovered lots of goods, and 349 bodies.

Several newspapers reported that a body of one of the crew members known as Bill was discovered to be female. "She was about twenty or twenty-five years old and had served as a common sailor for three voyages, and her sex was never known until the body was washed ashore and prepared for burial. She is described as having been a great favorite with all her shipmates, and one of the crew, speaking of her, remarked: "I didn't know Bill was a woman. He used to take his grog as regular as any of us, and was always begging or stealing tobacco. He was a good fellow, though, and I am sorry he was a woman."

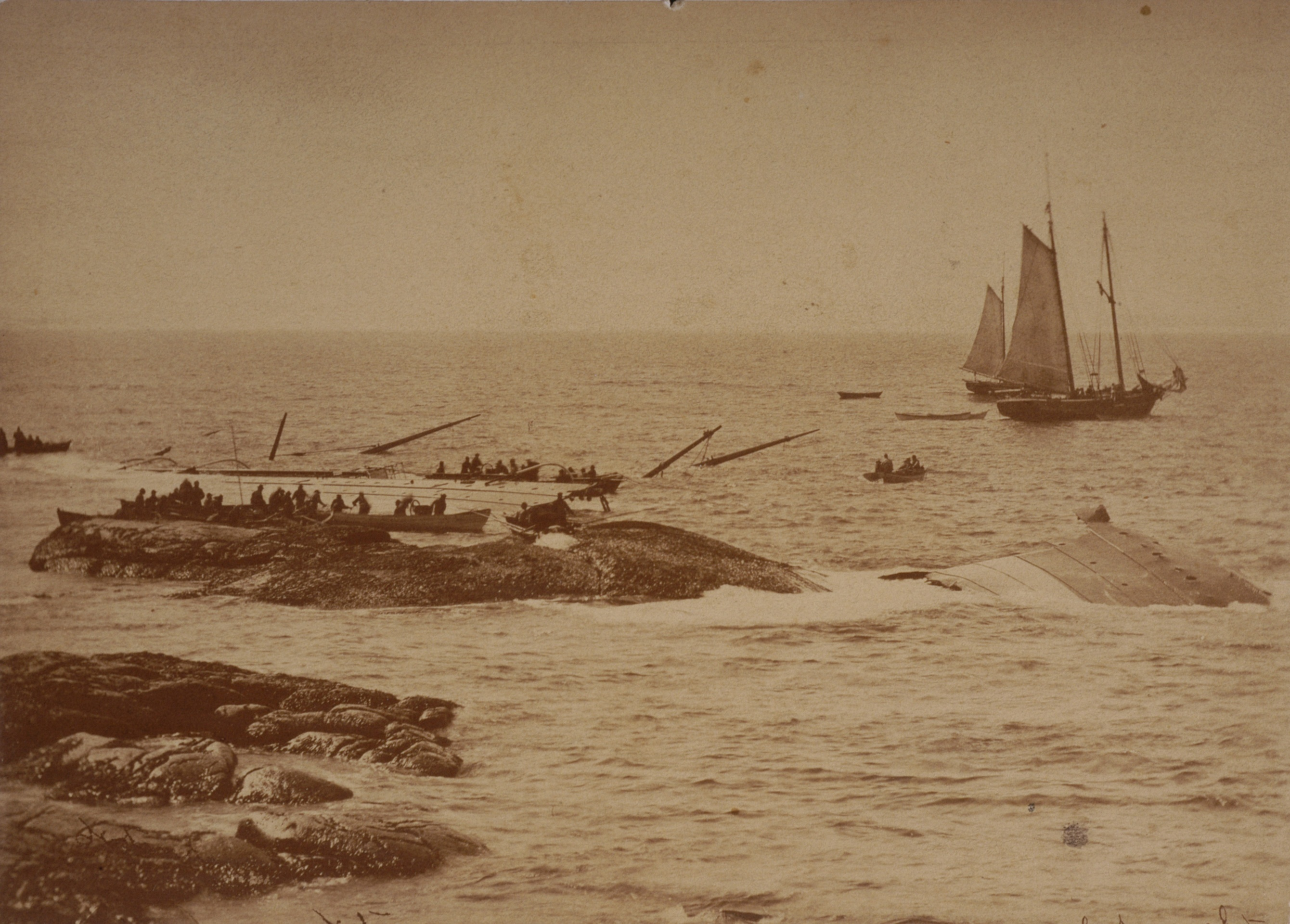
Wreck of Atlantic during body and cargo recovery, April 1873

277 of the victims were buried in a mass grave at St. Paul's Anglican Cemetery in Terence Bay, whilst another 150 were interred at the nearby Star of the Sea Roman Catholic Cemetery in Lower Prospect.

==== Enquiries ====
There were two enquiries into the disaster. The first, by the Canadian government, was highly critical of Captain Williams, mainly on the grounds that he had failed to take frequent soundings on the approach to Halifax, and concluded with the statement, "the conduct of Captain Williams in the management of his ship during the twelve or fourteen hours preceding the disaster, was so gravely at variance with what ought to have been the conduct of a man placed in his responsible position." However, he did not have his Masters certificate withdrawn, due to his efforts at saving lives during the disaster. Instead, it was suspended for two years. The White Star Line was also criticised, due to allegedly not providing sufficient coal, something which the company denied. The enquiry stated: "The inference seems inevitable that she had not sufficient coals on board when sailing for a ship of her class."

The second enquiry was held by the British Board of Trade, which at first concluded that a shortage of coal had contributed to the disaster. However, after an appeal by the White Star Line, this was revisited, and a careful analysis showed that Atlantic did indeed have sufficient coal for the journey to New York. The report concluded with: "We are satisfied that the steamship Atlantic on her last voyage was supplied with sufficient coal for a voyage to New York at that season of the year. And, that at the time the vessel's course was altered for Halifax, there still remained sufficient coal to have taken her to New York and to leave 70 tons in the bunkers, even if the weather did not improve."

Mr. Foxley had in fact estimated that at least 150 to 160 tons remained; however, his professional pride and desire not to admit to giving incorrect estimates to the captain led him to submit the lower figure, which set off the chain of events which led to the disaster.

== Legacy ==
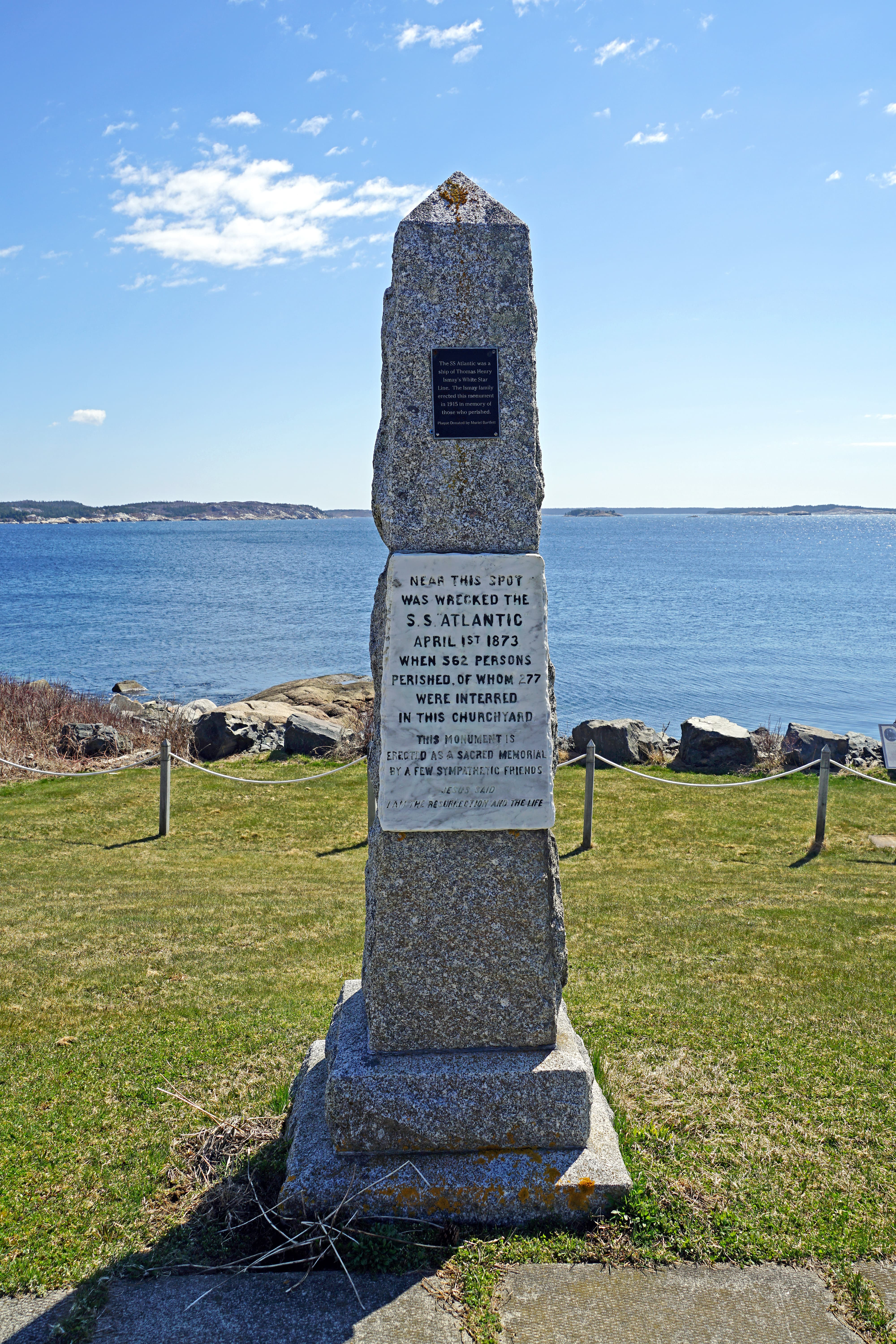
Memorial donated by ship owner Thomas Henry Ismay's family at the site of the mass grave

Atlantic was the second liner commissioned by White Star Line (SS Oceanic being first) but carried the notoriety of being the first White Star steamer to sink (the company had previously lost the clipper Tayleur in Dublin Bay in 1854). Other White Star ships lost in the North Atlantic include Naronic in 1893, Republic in 1909, and Titanic in 1912. The financial losses caused by the loss of Atlantic forced the White Star Line to sell two of their ships to raise capital, the Tropic and Asiatic.

Most of the ship lies heavily fragmented under 40 to 60 feet (12 to 18 m) of water. Artifacts recovered from several salvage operations are on display at the Maritime Museum of the Atlantic in Halifax, Nova Scotia and also at the SS Atlantic Heritage Park and Interpretation Centre, in Terence Bay, Nova Scotia. A monument to the wreck, donated by ship owner Thomas Henry Ismay's family, is located at the mass grave near the interpretation centre in the Terence Bay Anglican Cemetery, while a smaller monument marks a second mass grave at the Catholic cemetery.

The 1929 film Atlantic was originally named Titanic, made only seventeen years after the sinking of that ship. After lawsuits from the White Star Line, the movie was released under the title Atlantic, although the film is unrelated to the earlier White Star Line disaster.

P. G. Wodehouse wrote a story in 1921 called The Girl on the Boat in which six chapters of the romance take place on a White Star liner named Atlantic, crossing from New York to Southampton.

The dead female sailor was inspiration for the 2022 graphic novel Call Me Bill by a member of the family of one of the rescuers.
