= SS Alesia (1882) =

Ocean liner, 1882-1899

History

France
- Name: Alesia
- Namesake: Alesia
- Owner: Cie Francaise de Nav a Vap
- Operator: Cyprien Fabre & Cie
- Port of registry: Marseille
- Route: Mediterranean – United States
- Builder: T Royden & Sons, Liverpool
- Yard number: 213
- Launched: June 1882
- Identification: code letters HDFQ
- Fate: Sold for scrap in 1899

General characteristics
- Tonnage: 2,740 GRT, 1,830 NRT
- Length: 328.0 ft (100.0 m)
- Beam: 40.4 ft (12.3 m)
- Depth: 27.1 ft (8.3 m)
- Decks: 2
- Propulsion: 1 × compound steam engine; 1 × screw
- Speed: 11 knots (20 km/h)
- Capacity: Passengers: 18 first class; 1,000 third class

SS Alesia was a 2,790 GRT ocean liner built for the Fabre Line in 1882. She was scrapped in 1899.

== Description ==
Alesia was 328.0 feet (100.0 m) long, with a beam of 40.4 feet (12.3 m). She had a single funnel and two masts. Her engines were made by G. Forrester & Company, Liverpool. They could propel her at 12 knots (22 km/h). Her GRT was 2,790. Alesia had accommodation for 12 first class and 1,000 third class passengers.

== History ==
Alesia was built by Thomas Royden and Sons in Liverpool. She was launched in June 1882, and entered service with the Fabre Line under the French flag. Her port of registry was Marseille. Her maiden voyage was from Livorno, Italy to New York, United States via Tarragona, Spain, Bône, Algeria, Almería, and Málaga, Spain. Most of her service was between ports in the Mediterranean and New York.

On 4 December 1883, Alesia was spotted by SS Anglian under sail at 20°40′N 17°30′W as her steam engine was out of action.

In September 1887, Alesia was placed in quarantine on arrival at New York due to an outbreak of cholera. Eight people had died from the disease on the journey from Marseille, France and Naples, Italy. By 10 October, the death toll was 25. A further 2 deaths were reported, before the ship came out of quarantine on 26 October.

Alesia arrived at Algiers, Algiera on 29 May 1899 with her cargo of sulphur on fire. The ship's cook had been killed by the fire. She was on a voyage from Palermo, Italy to New Orleans, United States.
