= SS Asiatic =

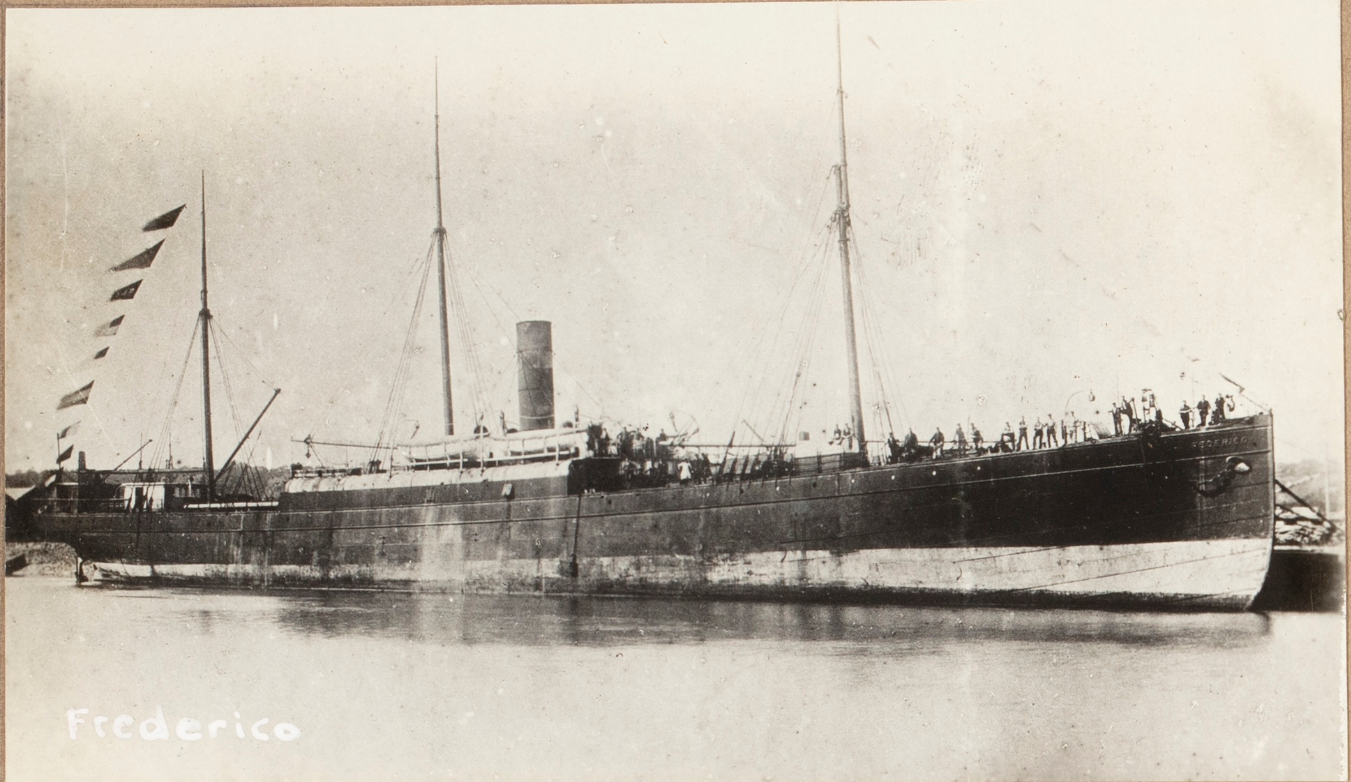
- Asiatic's sister ship, Federico late in her career

History

United Kingdom
- Name: SS Asiatic (1871-1873); SS Ambriz (1873-1895)
- Owner: White Star Line (1871-1873); African Steamship Company (1873-1895)
- Builder: Thomas Royden & Sons, Liverpool
- Launched: 17th August 1871
- Completed: November 1872
- Maiden voyage: November 6th, 1872
- Fate: Sold 1896

France
- Name: SS Ambriz
- Owner: Cie. Française Charbonnage et de la Batelage
- Acquired: 1896
- Fate: Wrecked February 1903

General characteristics
- Tonnage: 2,121 GRT; 1,376 NRT
- Length: 326 ft 5 in (99.49 m)
- Beam: 35 ft 2 in (10.72 m)
- Depth: 25 ft 7 in (7.80 m)
- Propulsion: 1 × 250 hp (186 kW) compound steam engine; 1 × 281 hp (210 kW) compound steam engine (from 1883); 1 screw
- Speed: 12 knots (22 km/h; 14 mph)
- Capacity: 10 × 1st-class passengers

SS Asiatic was a steamship operated by the White Star Line from 1871 to 1873, a sister ship to Tropic. Sold off after only two years, she was renamed SS Ambriz, and eventually was wrecked in 1903.

== Ship history ==
Asiatic was built as a passenger-cargo ship during the transition from sail to steam power, so she was fitted with three fully rigged masts in addition to her two-cylinder compound steam engine manufactured by Laird Brothers of Birkenhead, England. In addition to cargo, she could carry up to 10 passengers. She was launched by Thomas Royden & Sons of Liverpool on 17 August 1871, and the White Star Line bought her prior to her launching. She was registered on November 4 1871, and sailed from Liverpool to Calcutta two days later. She operated first in the Calcutta, India, trade, but transferred to the South American route in July 1872. From February 1873, she sailed to South America for the White Star Line. None of these enterprises proved profitable, and following the loss of the Atlantic in April 1873, the ship was sold to the African Steamship Company to raise additional capital.

Renamed Ambriz, she operated on the West African route from September 1873. In November or December 1875, she rescued the crew of the British barque Eagle, which foundered in the Atlantic Ocean. Ambriz grounded in the River Elbe on February 18 1880, and had her stern-post repaired. She later struck a submerged rock in 1882, but was repaired and returned to service. In December 1883, she was refitted and re-engined, and from 1894 she served on the Liverpool–New Orleans cotton route.

Ambriz was sold in 1895 to Hutton & Co. of Liverpool, but was sold again in 1896 to the Cie Française de Charbonnage et de la Batelage ("French Coaling & Shipping Company"), for which she served as a coal depot ship, regularly sailing from her base at Madagascar to Europe to replenish her coal supply. She was wrecked off the coast of Madagascar in February 1903.
