= SS Cufic (1904) =

Ship (1895–1932)

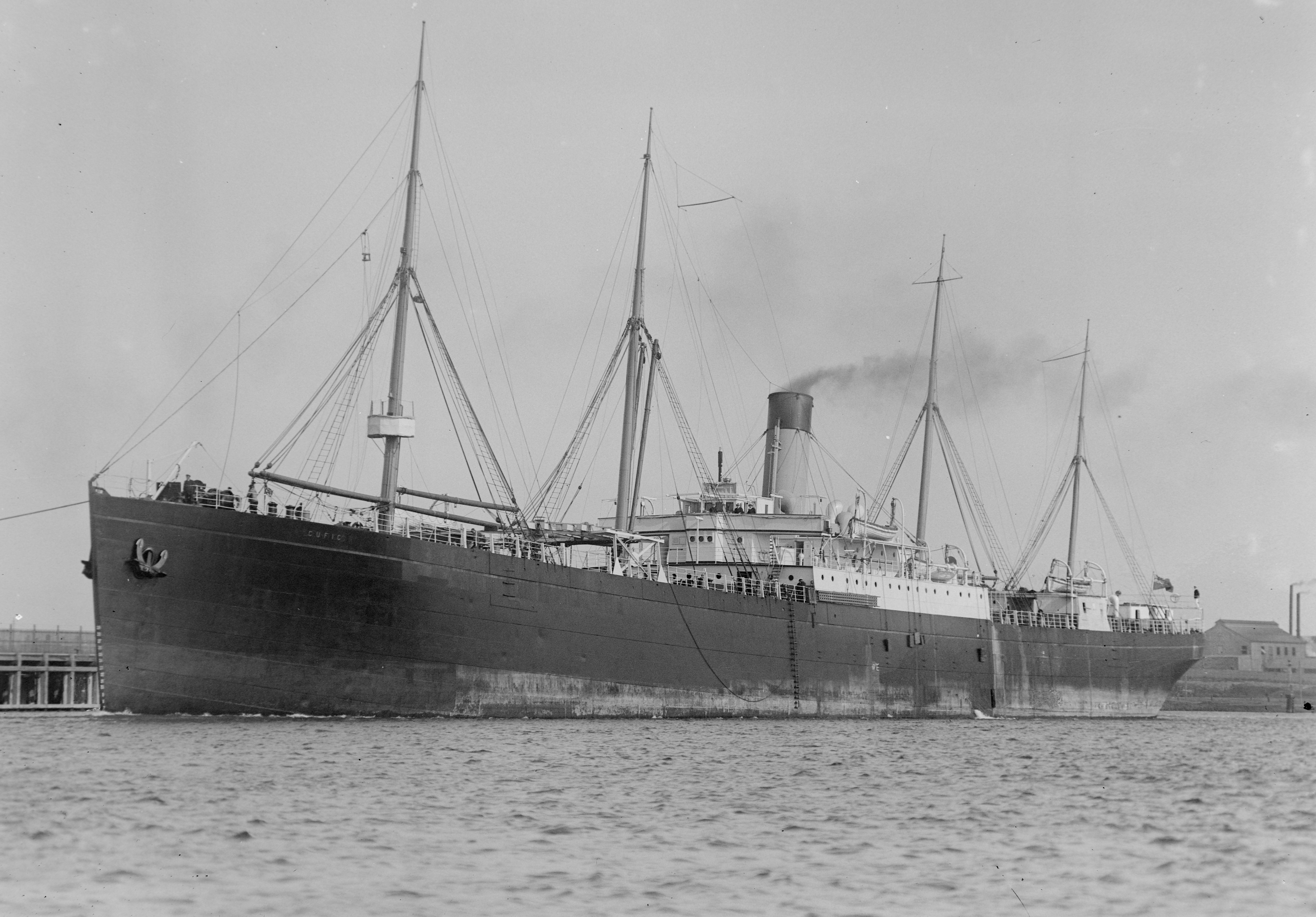
- The ship in service as Cufic

History

United Kingdom
- Name: American (1895-1904); Cufic (1904-1924)
- Owner: West India & Pacific Steamship Co (1895-1900); Fredrick Leyland & Company (1900-1904); White Star Line (1904-1923)
- Builder: Harland and Wolff shipyard, Belfast
- Yard number: 294
- Launched: 8 August 1895
- Maiden voyage: 9 October 1895
- Fate: Sold, 1923

Italy
- Name: Antartico (1924-1927); Maria Guilia (1927-1932)
- Owner: G.B.A Lombardo (1923-1924); Soc. Anon. Ligure di Nav, A Vapore (1924-1927); E. Bozzo & L. Mortola (1927-1932)
- In service: 1924
- Out of service: 2 April 1930
- Fate: Scrapped at Genoa in 1932

General characteristics
- Tonnage: 8,249 GRT
- Length: 475 ft (145 m)
- Beam: 55.2 ft (16.8 m)
- Installed power: Two triple-expansion steam engines
- Propulsion: Two propellers
- Speed: 11 knots (20 km/h; 13 mph) service speed
- Capacity: 60 passengers
- Notes: Combined cargo and passenger ship

The SS Cufic was a steamship built by Harland and Wolff in Belfast, which entered service in 1895 as the SS American for the West India and Pacific Steamship Company. She was a combined cargo and passenger ship which was originally built foralong with her sister ship the SS European.

In 1900, she was sold to the Leyland Line and, after the company was taken over by the International Mercantile Marine Company, she passed to the ownership of the White Star Line in 1904, along with her sister ship, and was renamed Cufic. During World War I, she served as a troop transport ship.

The Cufic remained with White Star until 1924, when she was sold to Italian ownership and renamed Antartico then Maria Guilia until being scrapped in 1932.

== Design and construction ==
The American was launched at Belfast on 8 August 1895, and delivered to the West India and Pacific Steamship Company on 8 October. She was principally a cargo ship, but also had accommodation for 60 steerage passengers. She was powered by two triple-expansion steam engines which could propel the ship to a maximum service speed of 11 knots (20 km/h; 13 mph).

== Career ==
The American started her maiden voyage from Liverpool to New Orleans on 9 October 1895, and on her arrival there, was loaded with a cargo of cotton. In 1898, she was chartered by the Atlantic Transport Line and placed on their New Orleans to Baltimore cargo service. This lasted until 1900, when the entire 20 ship fleet of the West India and Pacific Steamship Company was bought by the Leyland Line. The same year American was requisitioned as a war transport for the Boer War.

In 1902 the Leyland Line and the White Star Line were taken over by the IMM Co. which set about transferring ships between its subsidiary companies in order to increase efficiency. In 1903 the American was deployed on the White Star Line's Liverpool to New York service, and the following year she was sold internally within the IMMCo group to White Star Line, and renamed Cufic, making her the second White Star ship to bear that name. Her sister ship the European was also sold to White Star and renamed Tropic.

Cufic and Tropic were then deployed on the White Star's Australian service from Liverpool to Sydney, principally for cargo, but also with some berths for steerage passengers. In this role they supplemented White Star's five Jubilee Class ships on the Australian service.

After the outbreak of World War I in 1914 Cufic was commandeered as a war transport and fitted with two 4.7 inch guns. In March 1917, she was taken up under the Liner Requisition Scheme, but was released back into commercial service in September 1919, following which she returned to the Australian service, however a decline in trade on this route in the early 1920s, meant that Cufic was withdrawn from service and laid up at Liverpool on 24 August 1923. Later that year she was sold for scrapping to G.B.A Lombardo of Genoa, Italy and in December she set sail for that port. On her arrival on 24 January 1924, she was sold again to Soc. Anon. Ligure di Nav, A Vapore of Genoa who returned her to service and renamed her Antartico. In 1927 she was sold again within Italy to E. Bozzo & L. Mortola and again renamed Maria Guilia. They operated her until 2 April 1930, when she was laid up for disposal. In November 1932 she was scrapped at Genoa.
