= Thomas Royden & Sons =

Thomas Royden and Sons was a shipbuilding company in Liverpool which operated from 1818 until 1893.

== Company history ==
Thomas Royden, a master carpenter, opened a shipyard on Baffin Street on the west side of Queens Dock, Liverpool in 1818. After a brief partnership with James Ward as Royden & Ward in 1819–20, he eventually took his two sons, Thomas Bland Royden and Joseph Royden, into partnership and the company was renamed Thomas Royden & Sons in 1859. In 1863 the company made the transition from building wooden to iron-hulled ships, and the same year Thomas Royden retired. In 1854 the company expanded by acquiring the neighbouring shipyard. Production increased from only six ships in 1866 to twelve in 1869.

The company also began operating its own ships, founding the Indra Line in 1888. This came to dominate the company's activities, and in 1893 Royden's sold their shipyard to concentrate on shipping operations and management. They sold the Indra Line to Blue Funnel Line in 1915, and from 1916 operated the Santa Clara Steam Ship Company on the South American route. The Santa Clara Company was sold to the Bristol City Line in 1930 finally bringing Royden's independent shipping operations to a close.

== Ships ==
Ships built by Thomas Royden and Sons include:

- SS Alesia, an ocean liner launched in 1882.
- SS Asiatic, a cargo ship launched in 1870.
- SS Lesbian, a cargo ship launched in 1874.
- Zanoni (1865)
- SS Tropic (1871)
- Brazilian frigate Dom Afonso
- SS Saladin (1890), a passenger ship for the Singapore–Fremantle route.

== See also ==
- Royden baronets
- Port Line
