= SS Bovic =

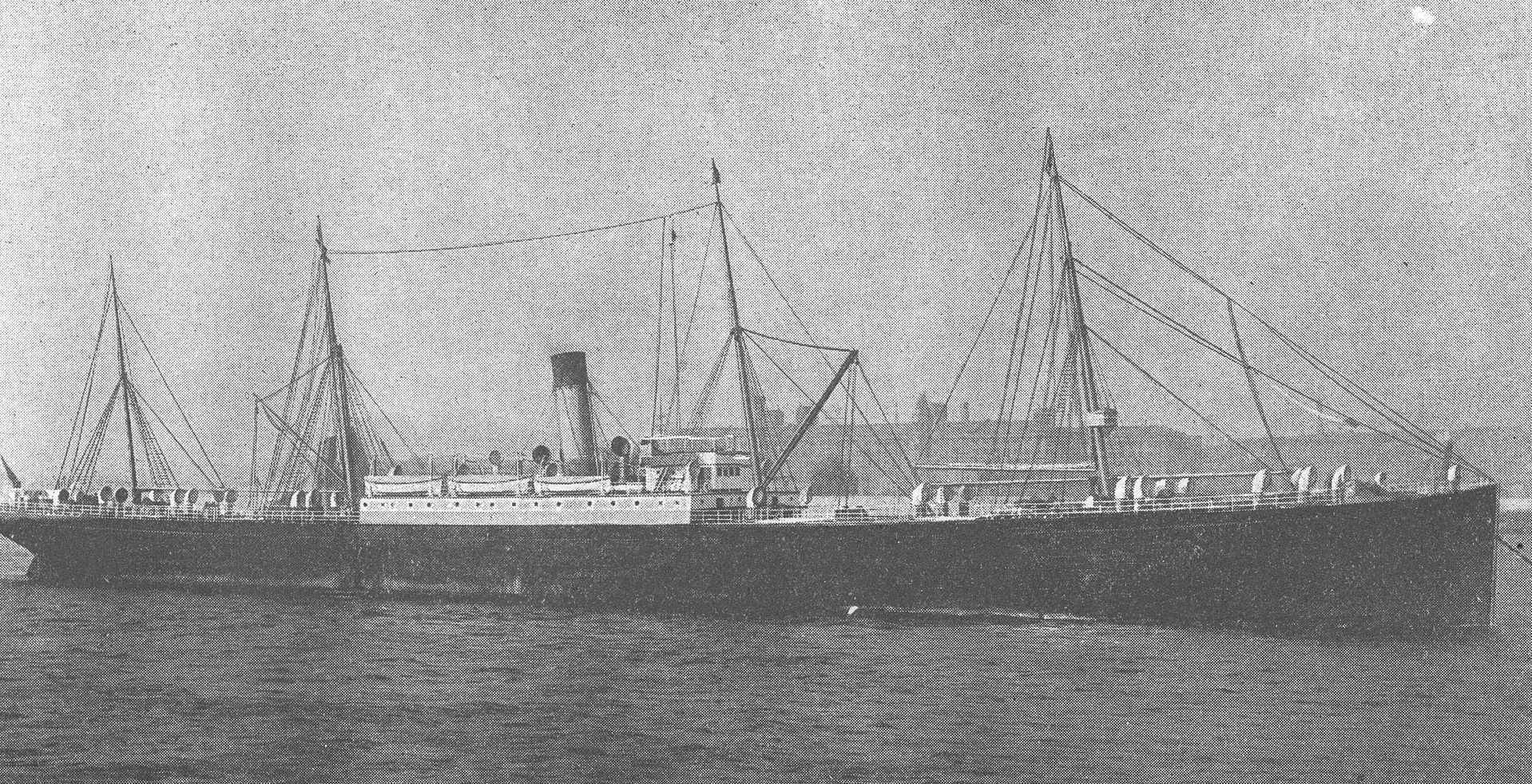
- SS Bovic

History

United Kingdom
- Name: SS Bovic (1892–1922); SS Colonian (1922–1928)
- Owner: White Star Line (1892–1922); Leyland Line (1922–1928)
- Builder: Harland and Wolff, Belfast
- Yard number: 252
- Launched: 28 June 1892
- Completed: 22 August 1892
- Maiden voyage: 26 August 1892
- Fate: Scrapped, 1928

General characteristics
- Class & type: Naronic Class
- Tonnage: 6,583 GRT
- Length: 470 ft (143.3 m)
- Beam: 53 ft (16.2 m)
- Depth: 35.6 ft (10.9 m)
- Propulsion: 2 × reciprocating steam engines, 2 screws
- Speed: 13 knots (24.1 km/h)
- Capacity: 15 Passengers, 1,050 Animals (1892-1918)

SS Bovic was a steamship built by Harland and Wolff in Belfast for the White Star Line.

== History ==
A sister ship to the Naronic, the ship was launched on 28 June 1892, completed on 22 August 1892 and began her maiden voyage on 26 August 1892, sailing from Liverpool to New York City. The ship was intended for the Atlantic cattle trade and able to carry about 1,050 cattle on the upper main deck and had special accommodation for horses amidships. She was designed to carry livestock, but with capacity for twelve passengers.

On 4 August 1900, Bovic was docked at Pier 49 at New York Harbor, adjacent to the White Star Line's flagship Oceanic, when a major fire broke out in one of her cargo holds, which threatened to spread to Oceanic. The fire was eventually brought under control before it could spread.

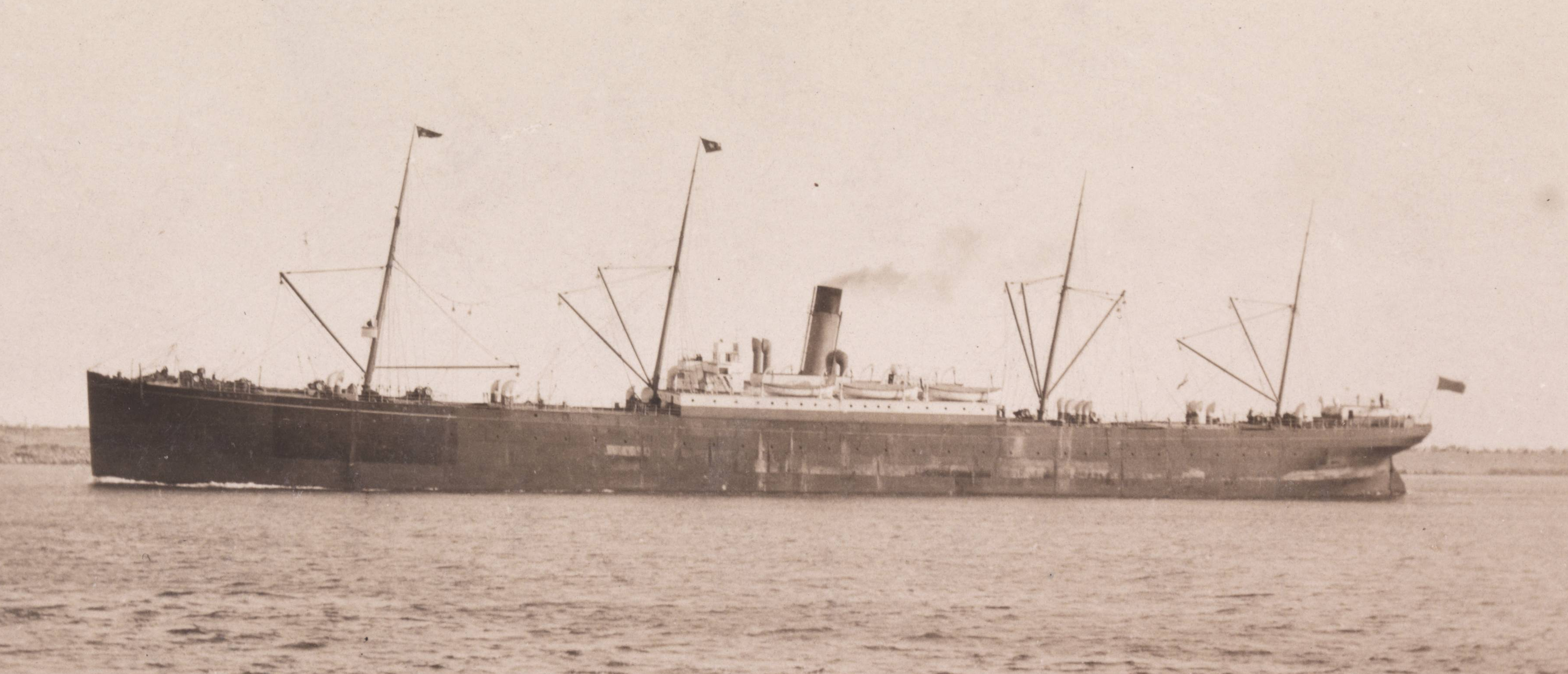
SS Bovic underway near Australia

In February 1914, she was seconded onto a new cargo service from the Port of Manchester to New York, and this required all four of her masts to be cut down to the height of her funnels so she could pass under the bridges of the Manchester Ship Canal.

On 19 August 1915, while off the coast of southern Ireland, she narrowly avoided destruction by what is believed to be the German U-boat U-24, which had sunk four other vessels, including White Star Line's Arabic in the same area that day. Bovic was pursued by the submarine, but managed to escape.

In April 1917 she was requisitioned for war service. She resumed White Star Line service between 1919, continuing to sail between Liverpool and New York until April 1922.

In April 1922 she was sold to the Leyland Line and renamed Colonian, and her masts were back to their normal height. She ran aground later that year in the St Lawrence river, but was refloated without damage. Two years later, her deck and side plating was redone in Liverpool by Harland and Wolff, and in the same year, rescued the crew of the sinking American steamship Santiago. She was scrapped at Rotterdam in 1928.
