= SS Tropic (1904) =

Ship (1896–1933)

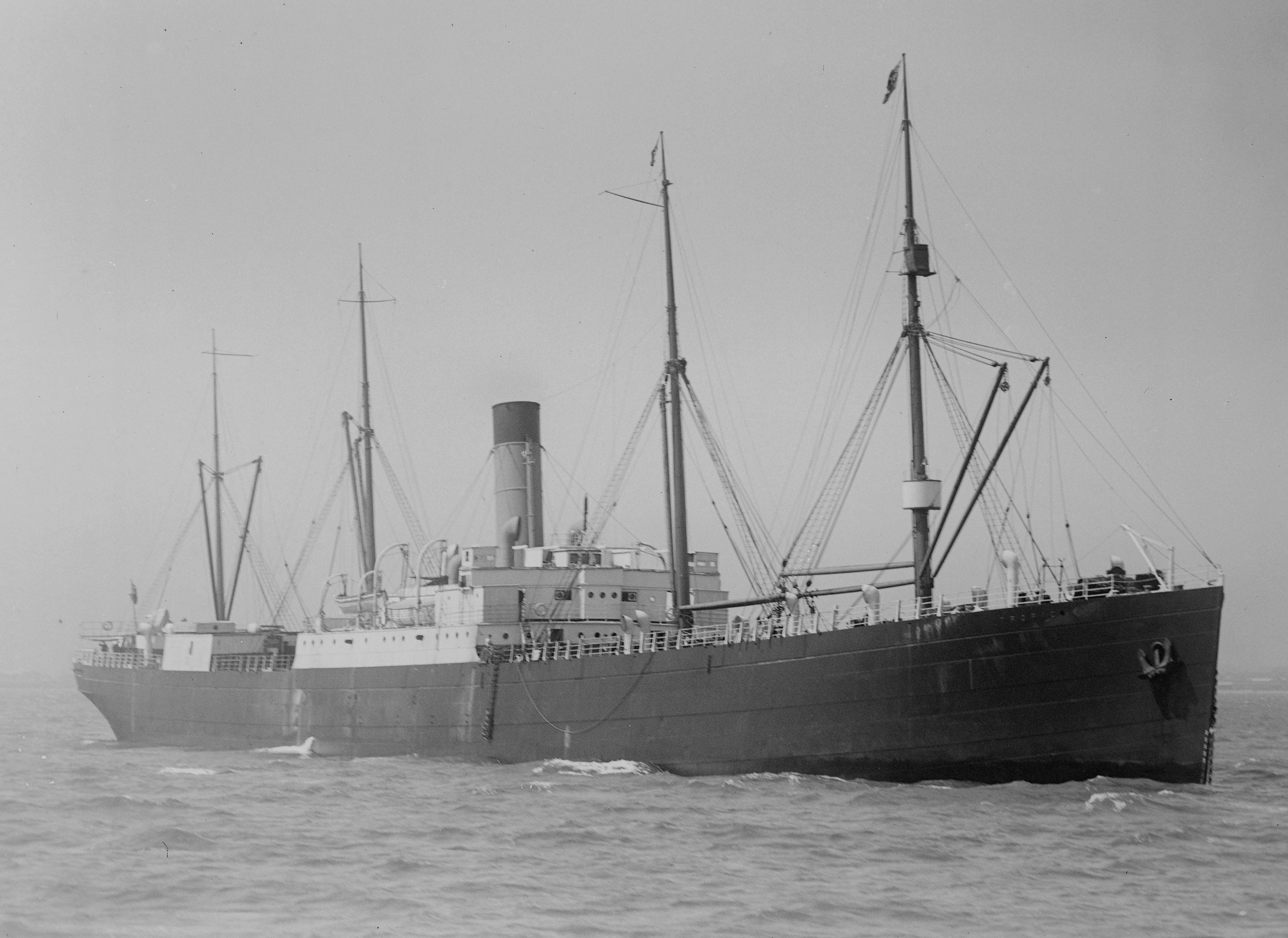
- The ship in service as Tropic

History

United Kingdom
- Name: European (1896-1904); Tropic (1904-1924)
- Owner: West India & Pacific Steamship Co. (1895-1900); Leyland Line (1900-1904); White Star Line (1904-1923)
- Builder: Harland and Wolff shipyard, Belfast
- Yard number: 303
- Launched: 9 July 1896
- Completed: 3 December 1896
- Maiden voyage: 9 January 1897
- Fate: Sold, 1923

Italy
- Name: Artico (1924-1927); Transilvania (1927-1933)
- Owner: Ditta L. Pittaluga (1923-1924); Soc. Anon. Ligure di Nav, A Vapore (1924-1927); Ditta L. Pittaluga (1927-1933)
- In service: 1924
- Out of service: 2 February 1930
- Fate: Scrapped at Genoa in 1933

General characteristics
- Tonnage: 8,249 GRT
- Length: 475 ft (145 m)
- Beam: 55.2 ft (16.8 m)
- Installed power: Two triple-expansion steam engines
- Propulsion: Two propellers
- Speed: 11 knots (20 km/h; 13 mph) service speed
- Capacity: 60 passengers
- Notes: Combined cargo and passenger ship

The SS Tropic was a steamship built by Harland and Wolff in Belfast, which entered service in 1897 as the SS European. She was a combined cargo and passenger ship which was originally built for the West India and Pacific Steamship Company along with her sister ship the SS American. In 1904 she passed to the White Star Line and was renamed Tropic, the name she retained until she was sold to Italian ownership in 1924, after which she became known as Artico then Transilvania until being scrapped in 1933.

== Design and construction ==
The European was launched at Belfast on 9 July 1896. She was principally a cargo ship, but also had accommodation for 60 steerage passengers. She was powered by two triple-expansion steam engines which could propel the ship to a maximum service speed of 11 knots (20 km/h; 13 mph).

== Career ==
The European started her maiden voyage on 9 January 1897, between Liverpool and New Orleans and would remain serving this route for the next three years until 1900, when she was requisitioned as a war transport for the Boer War. The same year the entire 20 ship fleet of the West India and Pacific Steamship Company was bought by the Leyland Line. In 1902 the Leyland Line and the White Star Line were taken over by the IMM Co. which set about transferring ships between its subsidiary companies in order to increase efficiency. In 1904 European was sold internally within the IMMCo group to White Star Line, and renamed Tropic, making her the second White Star ship to bear that name. Her sister ship the American was also sold to White Star and renamed Cufic.

Tropic and Cufic were then deployed on the White Star's Australian service from Liverpool to Sydney, principally for cargo, but also with some berths for steerage passengers. In this role they supplemented White Star's five Jubilee Class ships on the Australian service.

On 29 June 1905, Tropic was badly damaged after running aground 15 miles north of Constitución, Chile, presumably whilst returning to the UK from Australia via the Pacific. Her Second Officer and Purser reportedly drowned. After being refloated five days later it was found that the bottom of the ship had buckled and dislodged the boilers and machinery.

On 12 December 1908 she collided with the Argonaut Steam Navigation Company's coaster Wyoming.

After the outbreak of World War I in 1914 Tropic initially remained in commercial service to Australia, but was taken up under the Liner Requisition Scheme between 30 June 1917 and 10 July 1919. Following this she returned to the Australian service, however a decline in trade on this route in the early 1920s, meant that Tropic was withdrawn from service and sold in December 1923 to Ditta L. Pittaluga of Genoa, Italy. In January the following year she was sold again within Italy to 'Soc. Anon. Ligure di Nav, A Vapore' along with her sister Cufic and was renamed Artico. Three years later she was sold back to Ditta L. Pittaluga who renamed her Transilvania, she remained in service with them until 2 February 1930, after which she was laid up for disposal at Genoa, where she was scrapped three years later.
