= SS Lesbian (1874) =

Cargo ship built in 1874

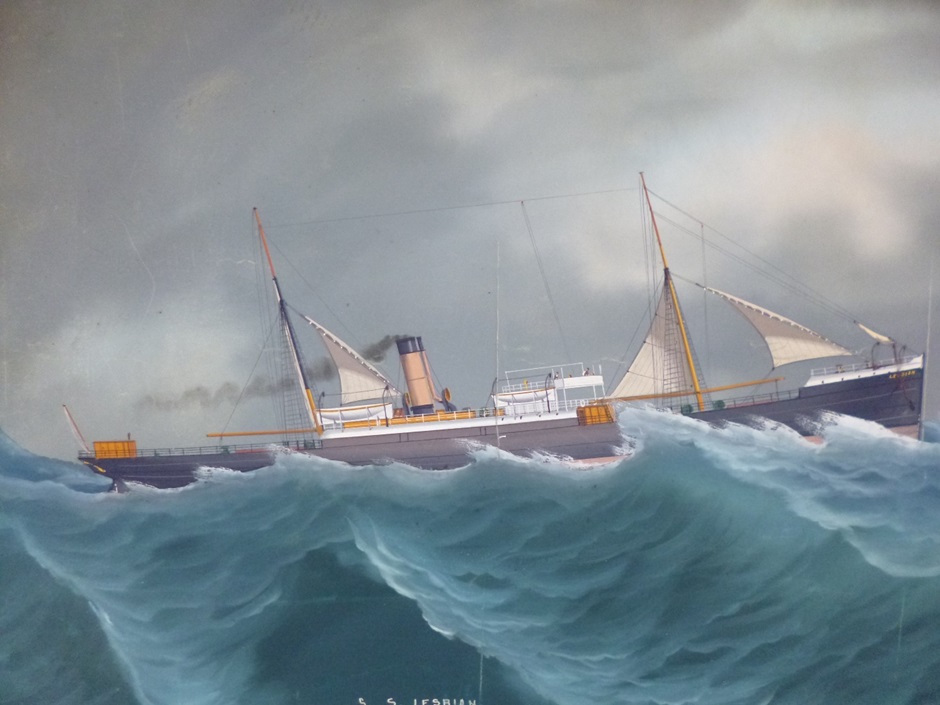
- SS Lesbian

History
- Name: Lesbian (1874-1901); Algeria (1901-03)
- Namesake: Lesbians
- Owner: F Leyland & Co (1874-1901); Ellerman Lines Ltd (1901-03)
- Port of registry: (United Kingdom) Liverpool
- Builder: Thomas Royden & Sons, Liverpool
- Yard number: 162
- Launched: July 1874
- Identification: UK Official Number: 70850
- Fate: Scrapped 1903

General characteristics
- Tonnage: 1,559 GRT

Lesbian was a 1,559 GRT cargo liner which was built by Thomas Royden & Sons Ltd., Liverpool. She was launched in 1874 and scrapped in 1903.

== History ==
Lesbian was built in 1874 by Thomas Royden & Sons Ltd, Liverpool as yard number 162. Launched in July 1874, she was built for F R Leyland and Co. In July 1878, the steamship Sicilian suffered a broken propeller shaft. Sicilian was towed in to Gibraltar on 3 July by Lesbian. In February 1888, Lesbian ran aground at "Bulgar", Ottoman Empire whilst on a voyage from Constantinople to Liverpool. She served with the Leyland Line until 1901, when she was sold to Ellerman Lines Ltd. She was renamed Algeria and served for a further two years. Algeria was scrapped at Livorno, Italy in 1903.

== Official number and code letters ==
Official Numbers were a forerunner to IMO Numbers.

Lesbian had the UK Official Number 70850.
