= SS Tauric =

Ocean liner in service from 1891 to 1929

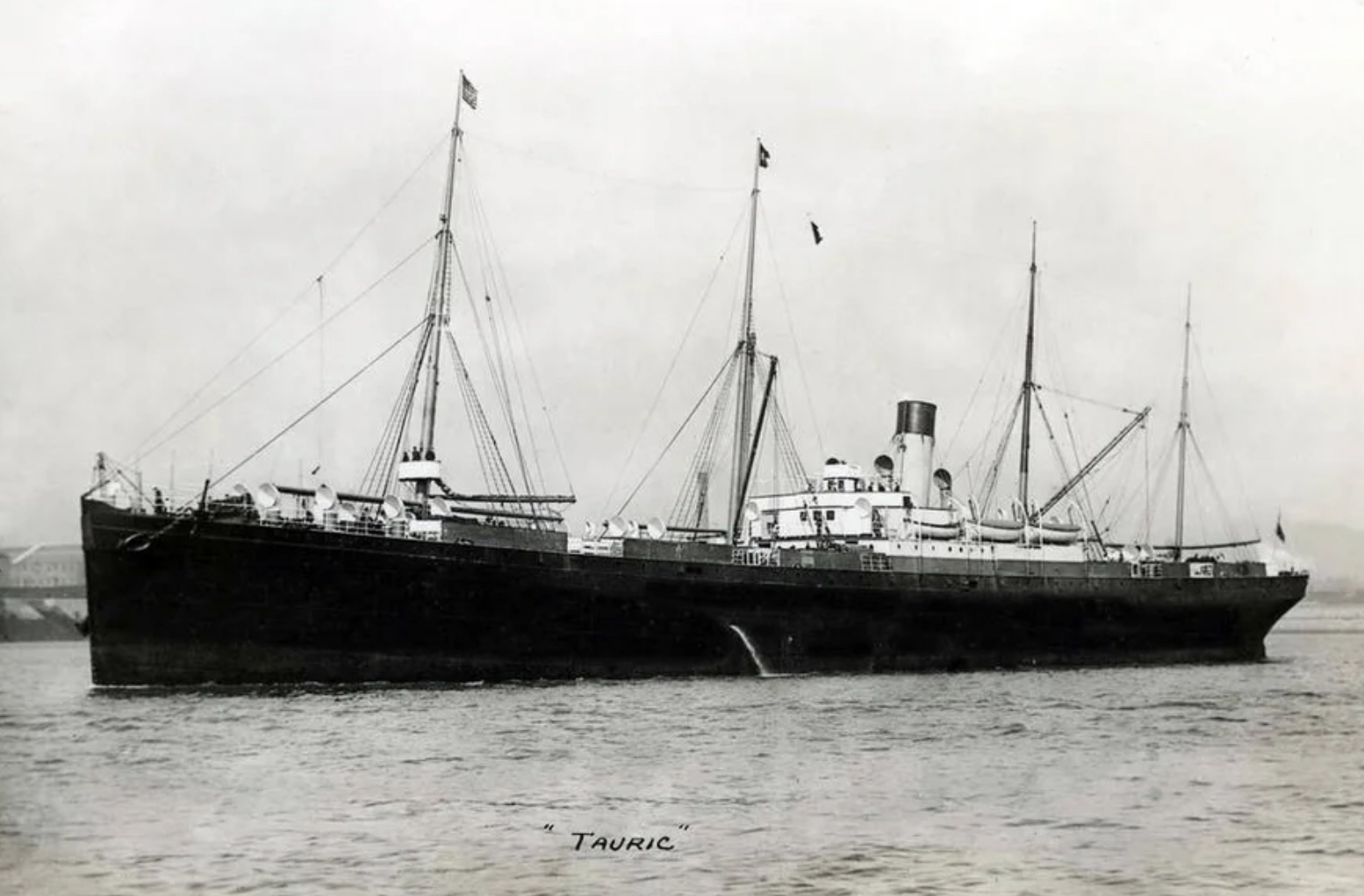
- SS Tauric departing port c. 1894.

History

United Kingdom
- Name: Tauric (1891–1904); Welshman (1904–1929)
- Owner: White Star Line
- Operator: Dominion Line (1903–1921); Leyland Line (1921–1929)
- Route: Liverpool to Portland Maine (1891–1903
- Builder: Harland & Wolff
- Yard number: 237
- Launched: 12 March 1891
- Completed: 16 May 1891
- Fate: Scrapped 1929

General characteristics
- Type: Livestock carrier
- Tonnage: 5,727 GRT

SS Tauric was a steamship built in 1891 by Harland & Wolff for the White Star Line and completed on 16 May 1891. She was the sister ship of Nomadic Though designed as a livestock carrier, Tauric carried a small amount of cabin-(second-) and steerage-(third-) class passengers.

Her maiden voyage began at Liverpool on 22 May 1891, and ended at New York. In November that year, she became grounded on the Romer Shoals whilst inbound to New York, and had to be pulled off by five tugs at high tide, after her cargo had been unloaded to other ships in order to lighten her.

Later that month, she was involved in a collision with the Baltimore in the Mersey, causing slight damage to both ships, a year later on 27 November 1892, she was involved in another more serious collision in the Mersey, this time with the Buenos Ayrean; this collision caused significant damage to both ships.

On 10 February 1895, she went to the rescue of a sinking ship the Rialto whilst en route to New York, and rescued the 14 people aboard.

In March 1903, the ship was transferred to the White Star Line's sister company, the Dominion Line, and she was moved to the Liverpool to Portland, Maine route. She took on the name Welshman from 1904. The Dominion Line in turn transferred her to the Leyland Line in 1921. She was scrapped eight years later, in 1929.

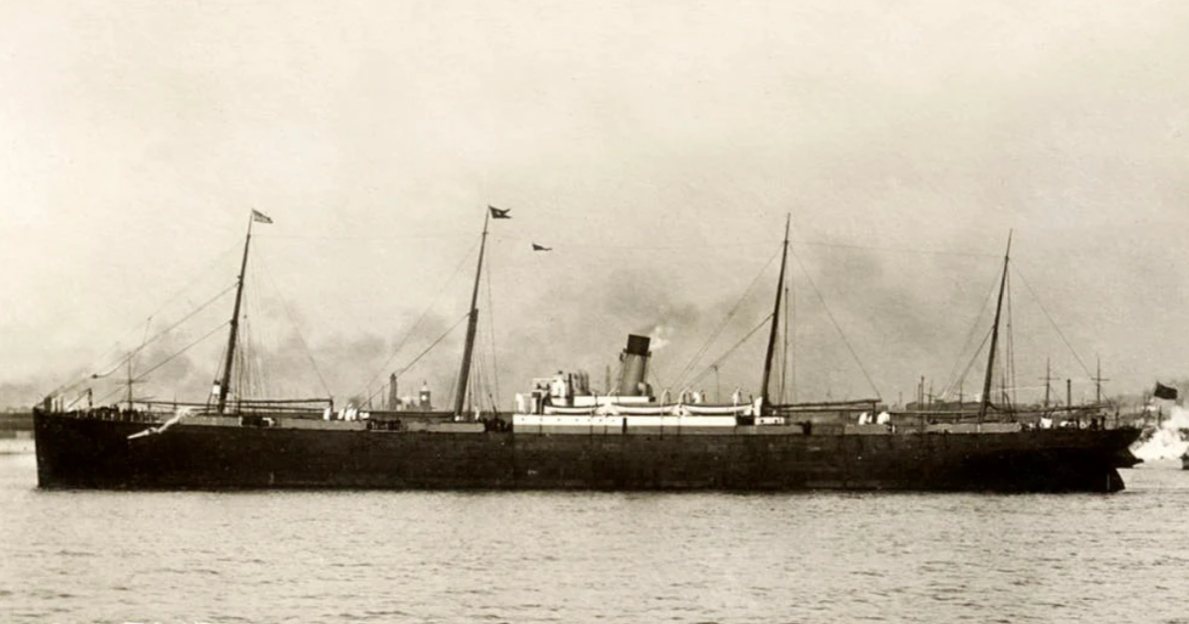
SS Tauric departing port in 1896

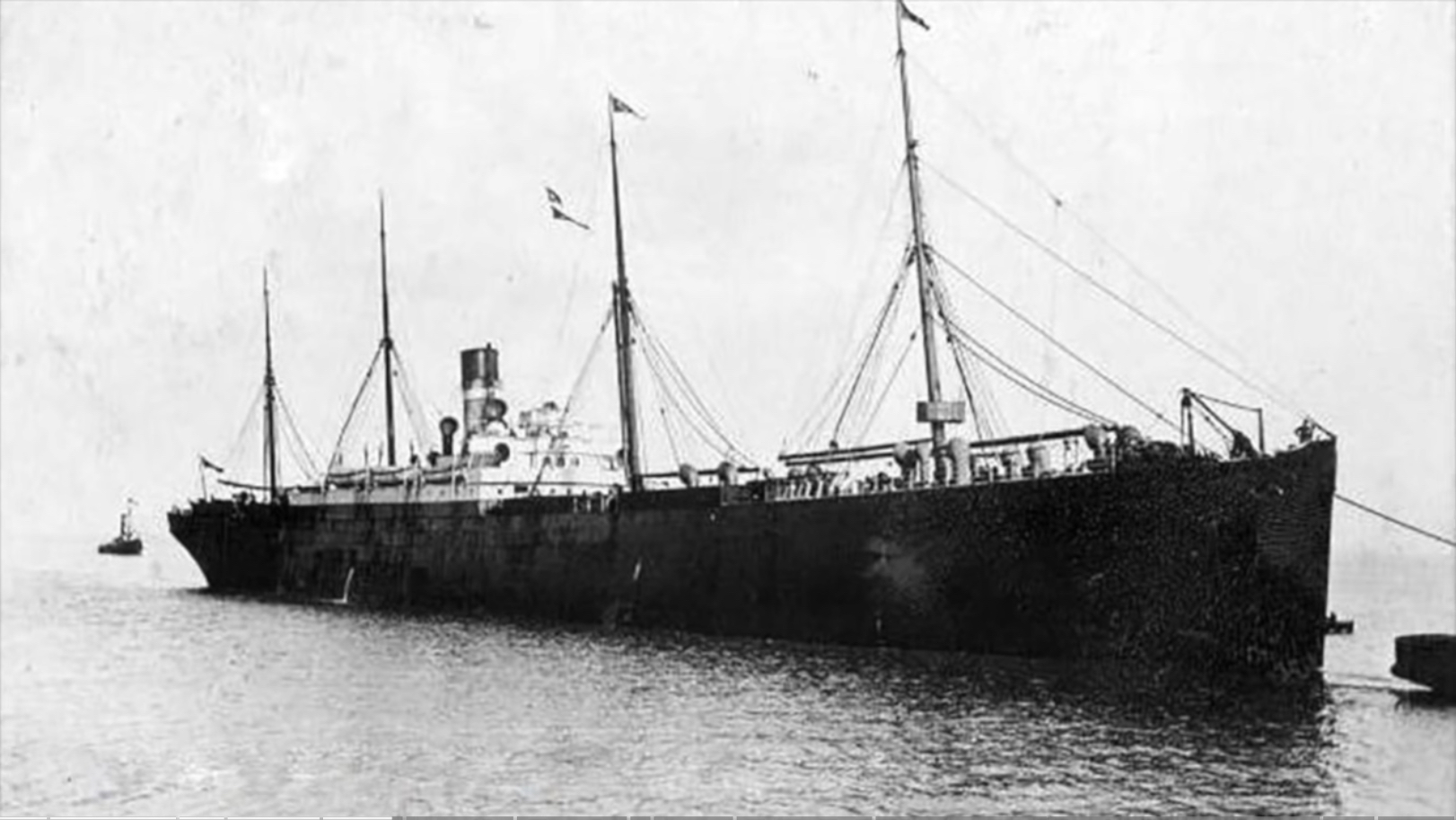
The SS Welshman (originally White star Liner Tauric) arriving in port
