= SS Cornishman =

Transatlantic steamship

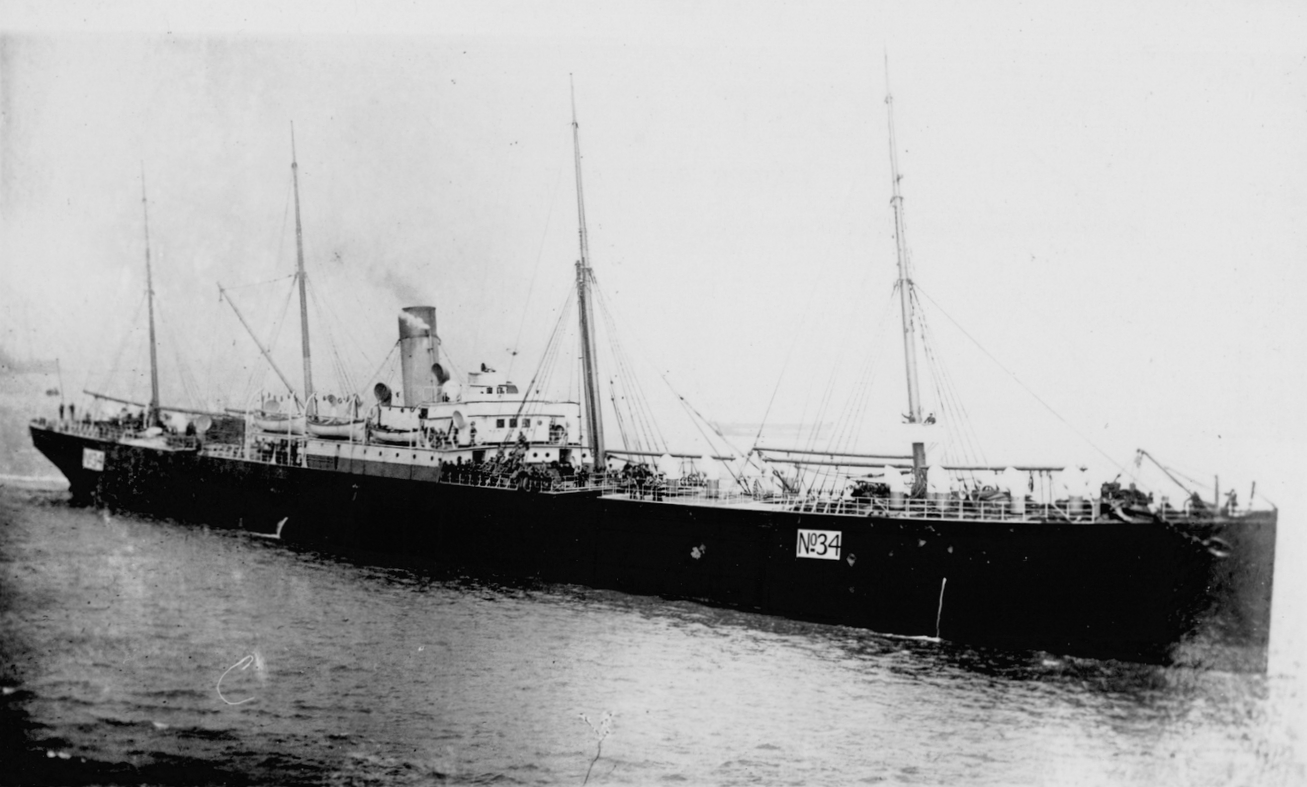
- The SS Cornishman as the SS Nomadic, during its time as a troopship

History

United Kingdom
- Name: Nomadic (1891–1904); Cornishman (1904–1926)
- Owner: White Star Line (1891–1903); Dominion Line (1903–1921); Frederick Leyland & Co. (1921–1926)
- Port of registry: (United Kingdom of Great Britain and Ireland) Liverpool, UK (1894–1923)
- Builder: Harland & Wolff, Belfast
- Yard number: 236
- Launched: 11 February 1891
- Completed: 14 April 1891
- Maiden voyage: 24 April 1891
- Fate: Scrapped in 1926

General characteristics
- Type: Passenger liner
- Tonnage: 5,749 GRT
- Length: 460 feet 10 inches (140.46 m)
- Beam: 49 feet 1 inch (14.96 m)
- Speed: 13 knots (24 km/h)

SS Cornishman was a steamship of the Dominion Line. She was laid down in 1891, as yard number 236 at Harland and Wolff Shipyards, Belfast, as a livestock carrier and completed on 14 April 1891 as the SS Nomadic, for the White Star Line. She was the sister ship of SS Tauric.

Nomadic sailed from Liverpool on her maiden voyage to New York on 24 April 1891 and spent the next few years on this service. She was requisitioned as a troopship and horse transport in October 1899 and spent the two years of the Boer War on this service, making three trips to the cape under the designation 'HM Transport No. 34'.

She was transferred to the Dominion Line in 1903, as part of the reorganisation of the IMM Co. and was renamed SS Cornishman in 1904. She made voyages to the US and Canada, continuing to sail these routes after her transfer to Frederick Leyland & Co. in 1921. She was finally withdrawn from service and scrapped in 1926.
