= SS Tropic (1871) =

Steamship operated by White Star Line

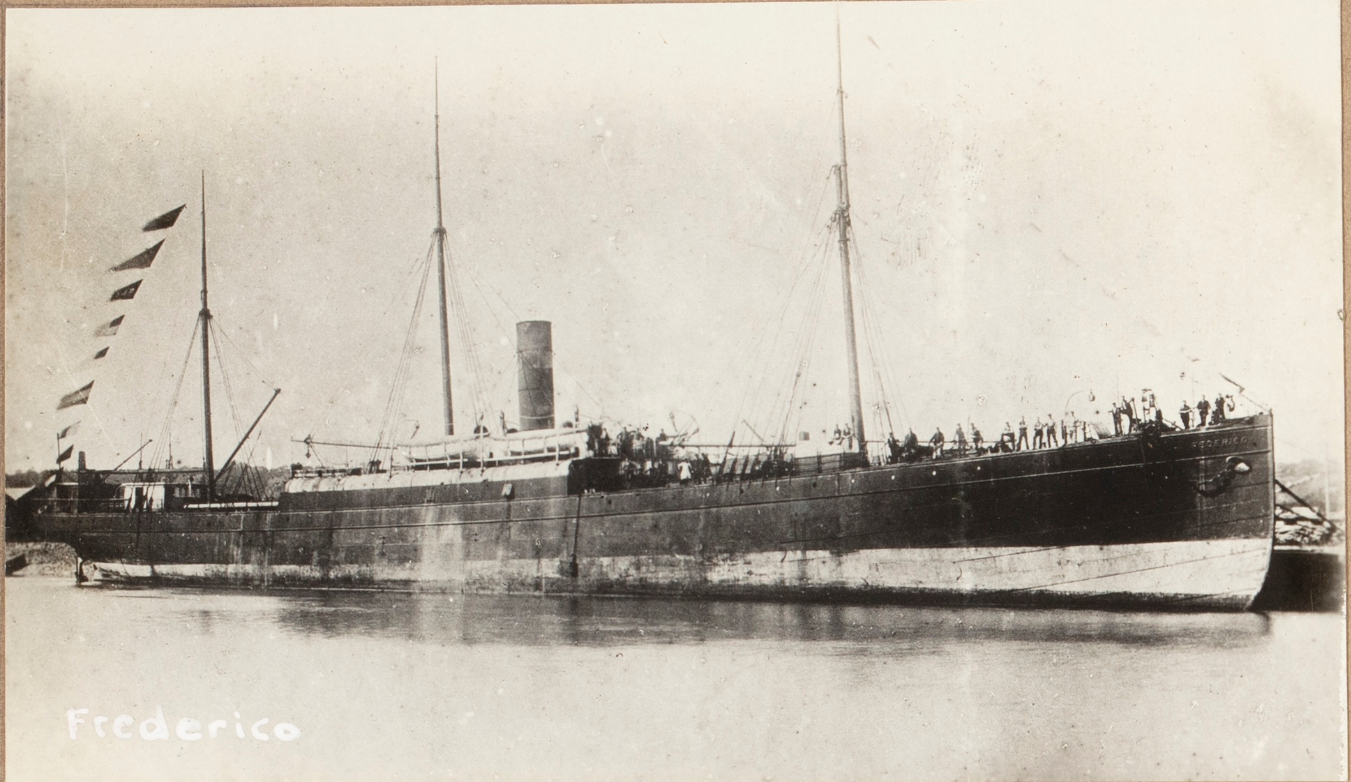
- SS Federico, unknown date

History
- Name: Tropic (1871–1873); Federico (1873–94)
- Owner: White Star Line (1871–1873); Serra y Font (1873–1884); La Flecha (1884-1894)
- Operator: White Star Line
- Port of registry: (United Kingdom of Great Britain and Ireland) Liverpool, United Kingdom (1871-73); Spain (1873-94)
- Ordered: 1870
- Builder: Thos. Royden & Co
- Yard number: 76
- Laid down: 1870
- Launched: 14 October 1871
- Completed: January 1872
- Maiden voyage: January 8th, 1872
- Out of service: June 1892
- Fate: Scrapped in Rosyth in 1894

General characteristics
- Type: Steamship
- Tonnage: 2,122 GRT
- Length: 99 m (326 ft)
- Beam: 11 m (35 ft)
- Depth: 10 m (33 ft)
- Decks: 3
- Installed power: Steam engine
- Propulsion: Sails and one four blade propeller
- Speed: 13 knots (24 km/h)
- Capacity: ~10 passengers
- Crew: 40

SS Tropic was a steamship operated by the White Star Line. Built in 1871 by shipbuilders Thos. Royden & Co, the 2,122 gross register ton vessel operated on the Liverpool to Calcutta run in the earlier part of 1872, and later that year began serving South American ports from Liverpool. In 1873, the ship was sold to Serra y Font, Bilbao, and renamed Federico. She was operated by the White Star Line. She served alongside her sister ship, SS Asiatic.

== History ==
SS Tropic was built by Thomas Royden and Sons in 1871. She and her sister SS Asiatic were bought by the White Star Line before their construction was finished. Even though Tropic was made to carry cargo, she also carried 10 passengers. After serving on the Liverpool to Calcutta route for one year, which proved unsuccessful, her route was changed to Liverpool to Valparaíso, Peru on 5 November 1872. This also proved commercially unsuccessful.

In February 1873, a lifeboat was found from the sinking barque James W. Elwell with three survivors. James W. Elwell was sailing from Liverpool to Valparaíso when she caught fire and blew up ten weeks prior. Fifteen crew had taken to the boat, but twelve of them had subsequently died. The survivors were taken back to Liverpool by SS Tropic.

On 4 June 1873, she began her last voyage for the White Star Line. Along with her sister, she was sold, because the company was having financial difficulties after the loss of SS Atlantic. J. Serra y font, a Spanish shipping company, bought the two ships. Tropic was renamed Federico.

In 1884, she was sold to the La Flecha company, though retained her name and port of registry. After an uneventful career, she was sold for scrap in late 1894.
