= SS Cufic (1888) =

1888 livestock carrier

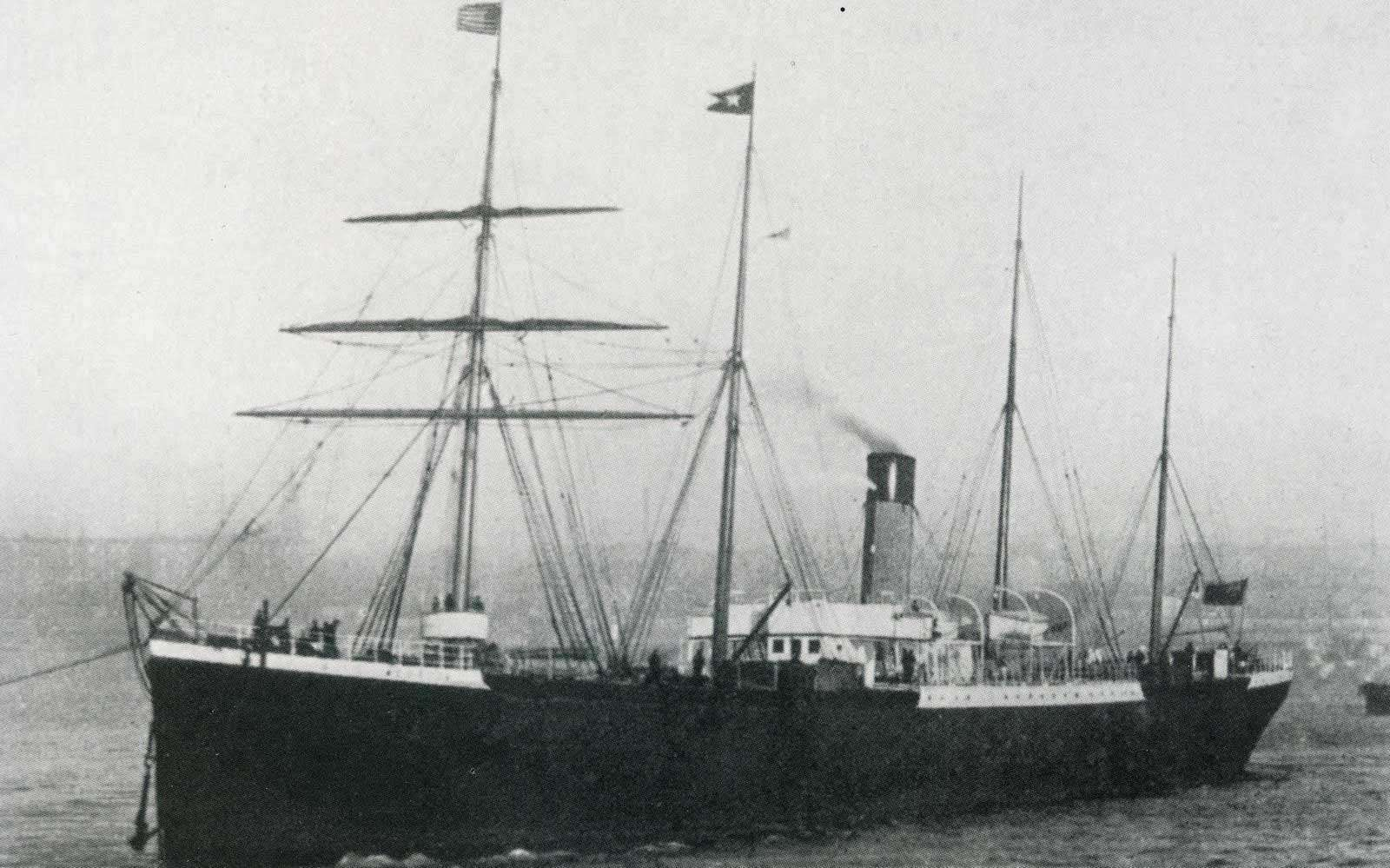

History
- Name: Cufic (1888–1896); Nuestra Señora de Guadalupe (1896–1898); Cufic (1898–1901); Manxman (1901–1919)
- Owner: White Star Line (1888–1896); Dominion Line (1901–1915); Elder-Dempster Lines Ltd.; R. Lawrence Smith Ltd.; Universal Transport Co.
- Builder: Harland & Wolff
- Yard number: 210
- Launched: 10 October 1888
- Completed: 1 December 1888
- In service: 1888
- Out of service: 1919
- Fate: Foundered December 1919

General characteristics
- Class & type: Cufic Class
- Type: Livestock Carrier
- Tonnage: 4,639 GRT
- Length: 131.24 m (430.57 ft)
- Beam: 13.77 m (45.17 ft)
- Decks: 3 superstructure decks (Including upper open bridge)
- Propulsion: Single Screw
- Speed: 12 knots
- Crew: 40

SS Cufic was a livestock carrier built by British shipbuilder Harland & Wolff for its White Star Line. Its construction was completed on December 1, 1888, ultimately weighing in at 4,639 gross registered tons. Her sister ship was the SS Runic. She primarily ran the Liverpool to New York route.

In 1896, Cufic was chartered to a Spanish shipping company, Compañía Trasatlántica Española. She was renamed Nuestra Señora de Guadalupe and transported horses between Spain and Cuba during the Cuban War of Independence.

In 1898, Nuestra Señora de Guadalupe was returned to the White Star Line and renamed Cufic. She was sold to the Dominion Line in 1901 and renamed once again, this time to Manxman. In 1916, she was sold to a Canadian shipping line, R. Lawrence Smith, Ltd. Manxman was used as a troop transport in 1917 and in 1919, she was sold to her new owners in New York.

On 18 December 1919, Manxman foundered in the North Atlantic with the loss of around forty crew whilst transporting wheat from Portland, Maine to Gibraltar. The ship had encountered terrible weather, and the crew was forced to abandon the ship in lifeboats. Nineteen people were rescued by the SS British Isles.
