= Arthur Rostron =

British merchant seaman (1869–1940)

Captain Sir Arthur Rostron KBE RD RNR
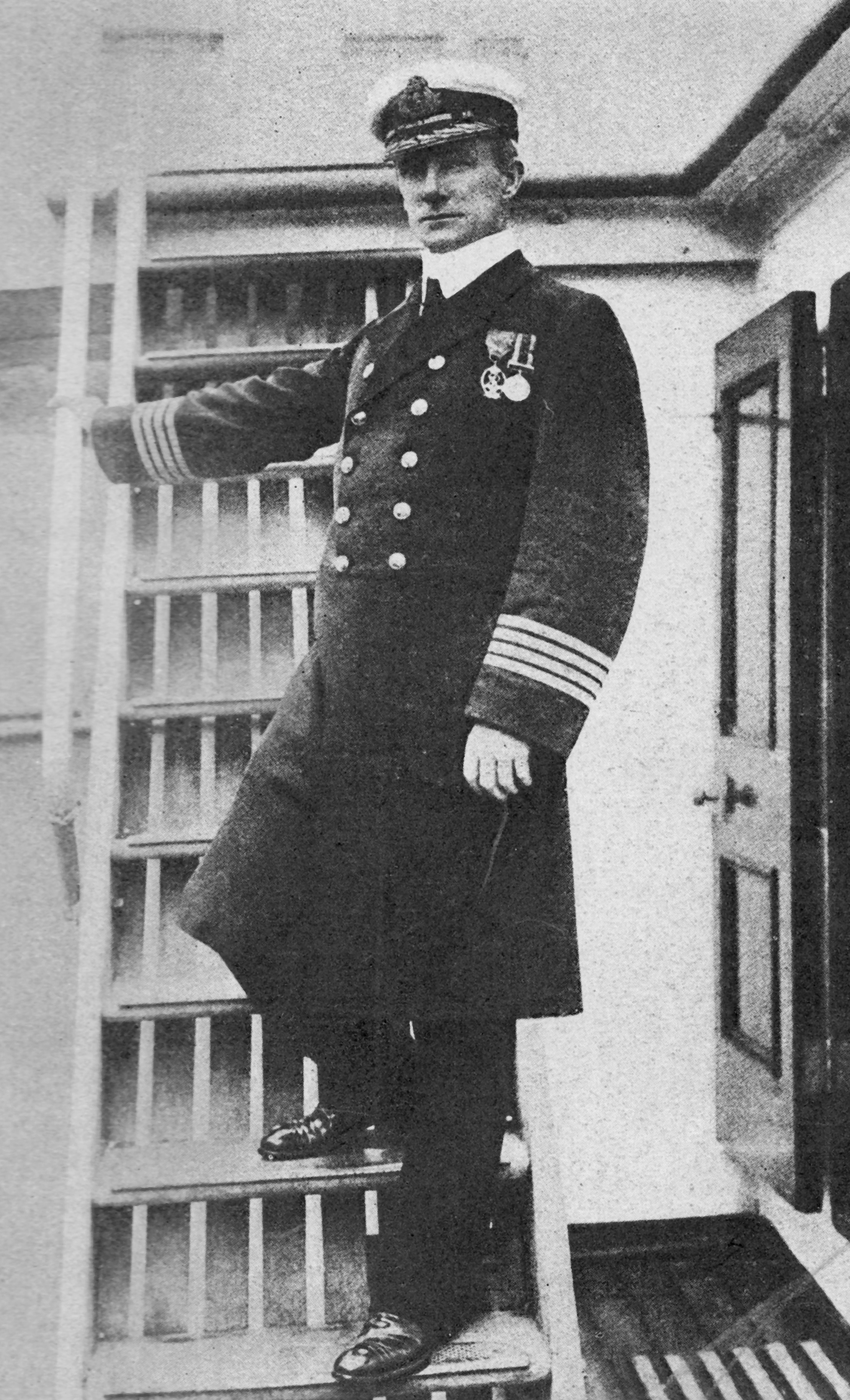
- Rostron while master of RMS Carpathia in April 1912, after rescuing Titanic survivors
- Born: 14 May 1869; Bolton, Lancashire, England
- Died: 4 November 1940 (aged 71); Chippenham, Wiltshire, England
- Burial place: West End, Hampshire, England
- Occupation: Merchant seaman
- Known for: Rescuing survivors from the RMS Titanic
- Spouse: Ethel Minnie Stothert (m. 1899)
- Children: 4
- Awards: Congressional Gold Medal
- Military career
- Allegiance: United Kingdom
- Branch: Royal Naval Reserve
- Service years: 1893 – 1924
- Rank: Captain
- Conflicts: World War I: Gallipoli Campaign
- Awards: Knight Commander of the Order of the British Empire; Decoration for Officers of the Royal Naval Reserve

Sir Arthur Henry Rostron KBE RD RNR (14 May 1869 – 4 November 1940) was a British merchant seaman and a seagoing officer for the Cunard Line. He is best known as the captain of the ocean liner RMS Carpathia, when she rescued the survivors from the RMS Titanic after the ship sank in 1912 in the middle of the North Atlantic Ocean.

Rostron won wide praise for his energetic efforts to reach the Titanic before she sank, and his efficient preparations for and conduct of the rescue of the survivors. He was awarded a Congressional Gold Medal by the United States Congress, and in 1926, he was appointed Knight Commander of the Order of the British Empire. He rose to become the commodore of the Cunard fleet and retired in 1931.

== Biography ==
Arthur Rostron was born at Bank Cottage, Sharples, a suburb of Bolton, Lancashire, England, to James and Nancy Rostron in 1869. He received his education at Bolton Grammar School and Bolton Church Institute. In 1884, Rostron joined the Merchant Navy Cadet School Ship HMS Conway as a cadet. After two years of training on the Conway, he was apprenticed to the Waverley Line of Messrs Williamson, Milligan and Co. in Liverpool on the iron clipper ship Cedric the Saxon.

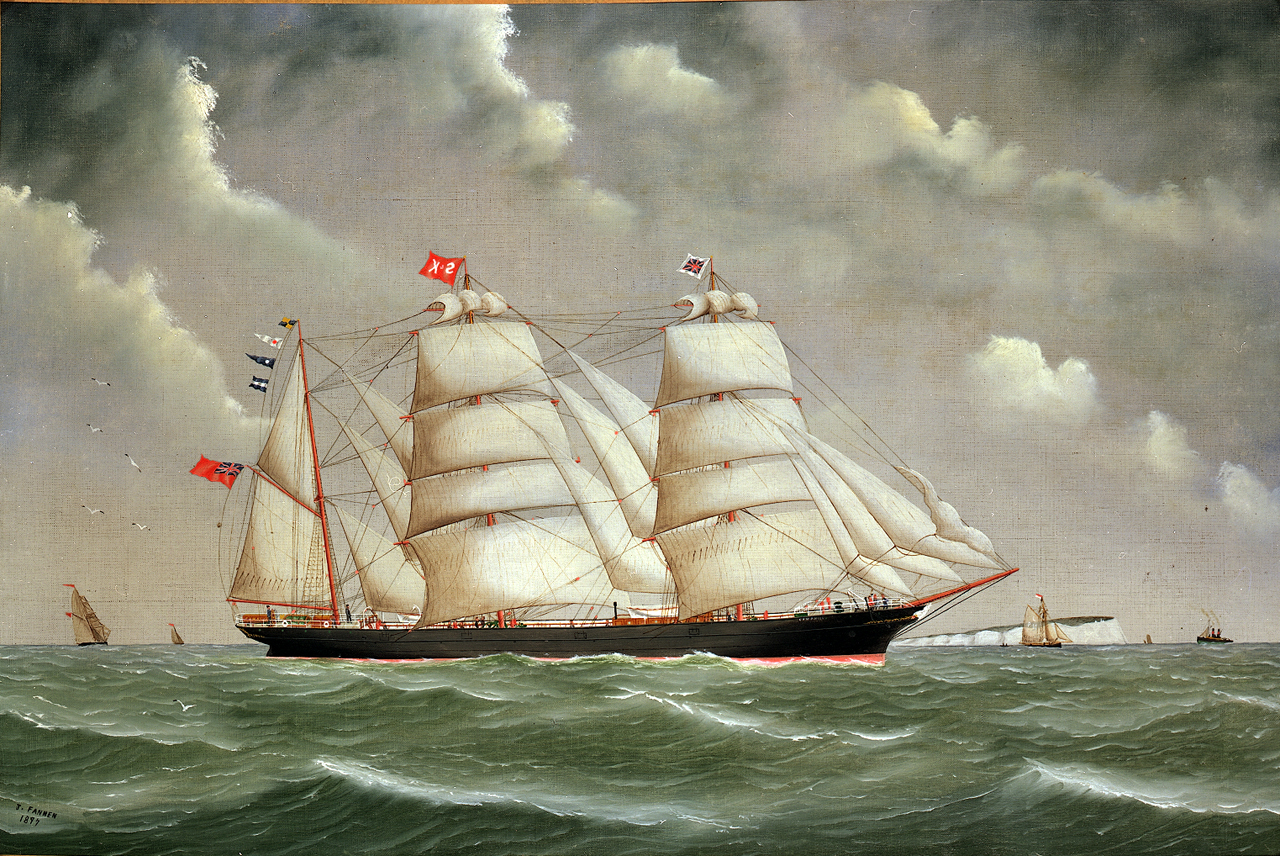
The barque Camphill - one of Rostron's earliest vessels

In 1887 Rostron joined the barque Red Gauntlet as a second mate. Soon after, he left the Waverley Line and joined the barque Camphill. He was commissioned a sub-lieutenant in the Royal Naval Reserve (RNR) on 28 April 1893. In December 1894 Rostron served on board the steamship Concord after which he passed the examinations for his extra master's certificate.

On 14 September 1899 Arthur Rostron married Ethel Minnie Stothert, daughter of Richard Stothert, in St John the Baptist church Atherton.

Rostron joined the Cunard Line in January 1895 and earned a position as fourth officer on the ocean liner RMS Umbria. In the years afterward he would serve on other Cunard ships including the Aurania, Etruria, Servia, Cherbourg, Ultonia and Saxonia. As a member of the RNR, Rostron regularly attended training at HMS Excellent (including in September 1902). He temporarily left the Cunard Line to serve with the Royal Navy during a period of international tension occasioned by the Russo-Japanese War of 1904–1905.

Rostron subsequently returned to the Cunard Line. He was made first officer of RMS Lusitania in 1907, but was transferred to the Brescia and promoted to ship's captain the day before Lusitania's maiden voyage. Brescia and his next several ships served the Mediterranean region, including his first passenger ship, RMS Pannonia, whose New York City – Mediterranean route he commanded from 1 January 1911. He became captain of the passenger liner RMS Carpathia on 18 January 1912. By this time a lieutenant in the RNR, Rostron was decorated with the RNR Officer's Reserve Decoration (RD) on 9 November 1909. He was promoted to commander in the RNR on 18 January 1912. During his time as captain, Rostron was called "The Electric Spark" by his crewmen, for his ability to make swift and decisive orders.

== The Titanic rescue ==
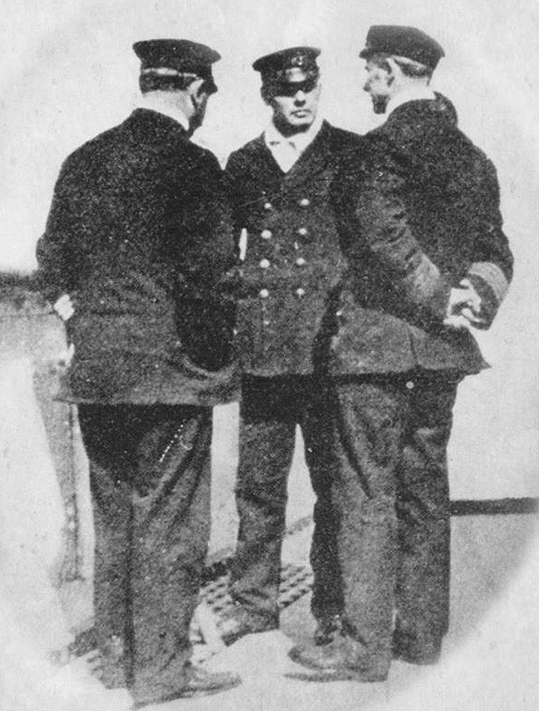
Rostron (right) with Titanic's Second Officer Charles Lightoller (centre) aboard RMS Carpathia after Titanic survivors were taken aboard.

Carpathia was on its regular route between New York City and Fiume, Austria-Hungary, when, early on 15 April 1912, she received a distress signal from the White Star Line ocean liner RMS Titanic, which had struck an iceberg during its maiden voyage. Rostron was asleep when Carpathia's Wireless operator, Harold Cottam, contacted Titanic at 12:20 a.m. to relay regular private party wireless traffic from Cape Cod, Massachusetts, United States. Titanic, which had struck the iceberg about 11:40 p.m., replied with a distress message and call for help. Cottam, along with First Officer Horace Dean, ran to Rostron's cabin to alert him.

When awakened, Captain Rostron was initially angry at Cottam but after being told what happened he immediately ordered the ship to race towards Titanic's reported position, posting extra lookouts to help spot and manoeuvre around the ice he knew to be in the area. Only after ordering Carpathia "turned to", towards the disaster scene, did Rostron confirm with Cottam that the latter was sure about Titanic's distress call. About 58 nmi (67 mi; 107 km) separated Carpathia from Titanic's position. Rostron and his engineering crew, led by Chief Engineer A.B. Johnston, skillfully obtained the maximum speed possible from the engines of Carpathia, coaxing her up to 17.5 knots (32.4 km/h) – three and a half knots faster than her rated speed. Even so, Carpathia, travelling through dangerous ice floes, took about 3.5 hours to reach Titanic's radioed position.

During this time, Rostron turned off heating to ensure maximum steam for Carpathia's engines and had the ship prepared for survivors, including getting blankets, food, and drinks ready, and ordering his medical crew to stand by to receive the possibly injured. Crewmen were placed in the corridors to reassure passengers alarmed by the increased speed and changed direction of the ship. Altogether, 23 orders from Rostron to his crew were successfully implemented before Carpathia had even arrived at the scene of the disaster. Rostron highly praised his crew for their efficiency in his report to line management. Rostron was a pious man: issuing orders, he often raised a hand to his cap and closed his eyes in prayer. Speaking of the risk taken by running through dense ice at speed at night, he is reported to have said, "I can only conclude another hand than mine was on the helm."

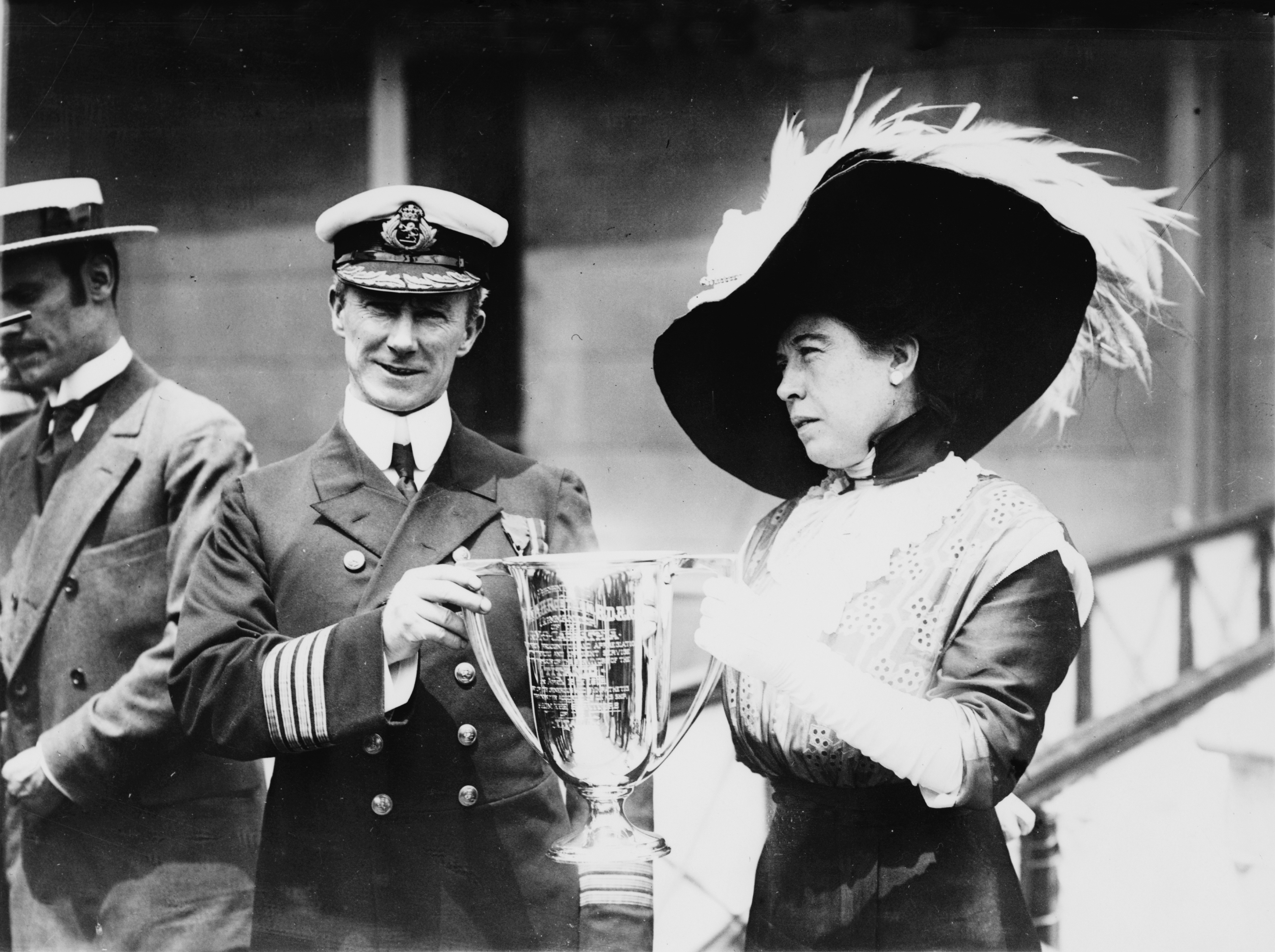
Rostron with Titanic survivor, Margaret Brown, after receiving an award for the rescue of the Titanic

When Rostron believed he was nearing Titanic, he ordered green starburst rockets launched to alert the sinking ship if she was still afloat, or to encourage her survivors if she was not. Carpathia began picking up survivors about an hour after the first starburst was seen by those in the lifeboats. Carpathia would end up rescuing 705 survivors out of the 2,228 passengers and crew on board Titanic; at least one survivor is said to have died after reaching the ship. After consulting with White Star Line managing director and Titanic survivor J. Bruce Ismay, Rostron decided to turn the ship around and return to New York City to disembark the survivors. Later, Rostron testified at both the US Senate and the British Wreck Commissioner's inquiries into the sinking. Titanic survivors, including Margaret Brown, presented Rostron with a silver cup and gold medal for his efforts the night Titanic sank. The cup was sold at US$200,000 at an auction by Henry Aldridge & Son in Devizes, Wiltshire, in October 2015. He was also awarded the Congressional Gold Medal, the Thanks of Congress, the American Cross of Honor, a medal from the Liverpool Shipwreck and Humane Society, and a gold medal from the Shipwreck Society of New York.

Rostron was highly praised for his efforts in both the American and the British inquiries into the disaster.

== Later life ==
Rostron continued in command of the Carpathia for a year before transferring to the RMS Caronia. Afterwards, from 1913 to 1914 he took command of the RMS Carmania, RMS Campania, and RMS Lusitania. Rostron was captain of the RMS Alaunia when the First World War began and the ship was requisitioned as a troopship, which Rostron continued to command. In 1915, Rostron and Alaunia were involved in the Gallipoli campaign in Ottoman Turkey, for which he was mentioned in dispatches for his services.

In September 1915, Rostron joined the RMS Mauretania and in April 1916 he joined the RMS Ivernia in the Mediterranean Sea. He returned to Mauretania in 1917 before taking command of the Andania, Saxonia, Carmania and Mauretania again. An acting captain in the RNR at war's end, he was promoted to captain in the RNR on 31 December 1918 and made a Commander of the Order of the British Empire in the 1919 New Year Honours list.

Rostron continued to command Mauretania after it returned to normal passenger service in June 1919. He took command of RMS Berengaria, formerly known as SS Imperator, in July 1920. From February to May 1924, he served as Royal Naval Reserve Aide-de-Camp to King George V. Rostron retired from the Royal Naval Reserve in May 1924, and in July 1926 he was knighted as a Knight Commander of the Order of the British Empire (KBE). In July 1926 Rostron again took command of Berengaria and became the Commodore of the Cunard fleet shortly after.

Rostron lived at Holmcroft, West End, Hampshire. After his retirement in May 1931, he became a member, and later captain, of the Southampton Master Mariner's Club, and wrote his autobiography Home from the Sea.

When his former ship, the Mauretania, sailed for Scotland to the shipbreakers in 1935, Rostron was supposed to have been on board; however, overcome with emotion, he refused to board her and instead waved farewell from the pierside, preferring to remember the ship as she was when he commanded her. During his time commanding Mauretania, the ship was nicknamed "The Rostron Express" by passengers, due to Rostron's insistent adherence to the ship's scheduled departures and arrivals.

== Death ==
Rostron and his wife had been visiting their daughter Margaret in Calne when he was taken ill. He developed pneumonia and died at the Cottage Hospital, Chippenham, on 4 November 1940, aged 71. His funeral service took place at St James' Church, West End, near Southampton, on 7 November 1940. He was survived by his wife, Ethel Minnie, and their four children. Ethel died on 7 July 1943 at the age of 69 and is buried beside him in the cemetery of West End.

== Portrayals in Titanic films ==
He has been portrayed in various Titanic films by several actors.

- Anthony Bushell (1958) - A Night to Remember
- Philip Stone (1979) - S.O.S. Titanic
- Terence Kelly (1996) - Titanic
- Eric Lawrence (1998) - Titanic: Secrets Revealed
- John Cunningham (1999) - The Titanic Chronicles
- Tom Stephens (2024) - Unsinkable
