= RMS Franconia (1910) =

1910 British ocean liner built for the Cunard Line

Coordinates: 35°33′9″N 18°26′0″E

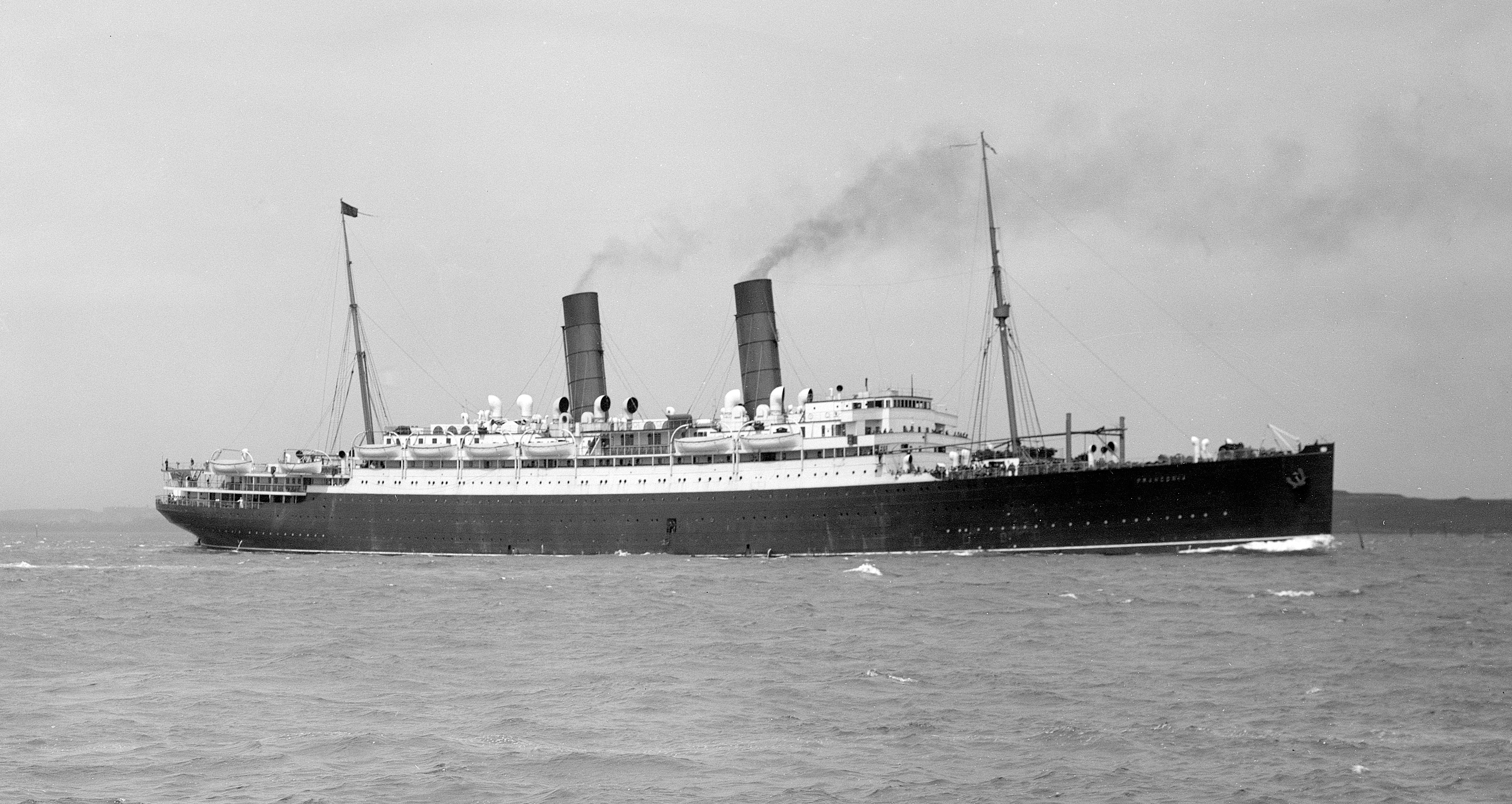
- RMS Franconia in Boston Harbor

History

United Kingdom
- Name: RMS Franconia
- Namesake: Franconia
- Owner: Cunard Line
- Operator: Cunard Line
- Port of registry: Liverpool, United Kingdom
- Route: 1900–1915; Liverpool–Boston; Liverpool–New York City; Trieste/Fiume–New York City; 1915–1916; Government war service
- Ordered: 28 August 1909
- Builder: Swan, Hunter & Wigham Richardson, Newcastle upon Tyne
- Yard number: 857
- Laid down: 8 October 1909
- Launched: 23 July 1910
- Christened: by Lady Elizabeth Forwood
- Completed: 21 January 1911
- Maiden voyage: 25 February 1911, Liverpool to New York
- Identification: UK Official Number 131315; Code letters "HSDC"; Marconi Radio Call Letters "MEA"
- Fate: Torpedoed and sunk, 4 October 1916

General characteristics
- Type: Ocean liner
- Tonnage: 18,150 GRT; 11,247 NRT
- Length: 625 ft (191 m) total; 600.3 ft (183 m) between perpendiculars
- Beam: 71.3 ft (21.7 m)
- Height: 90 ft (27.4 m) (keel to top of deck houses); 149 ft (45 m) (keel to top of funnels); 200 ft (61 m) (keel to top of masts)
- Draught: 29 ft (8.8 m)
- Depth: 44 ft (13.4 m) (depth moulded to Upper Deck)
- Decks: 7 passenger decks; 9 decks overall
- Installed power: 6 double-ended scotch boilers; Steam pressure of 210psi; 14,000 indicated horsepower
- Propulsion: Steam quadruple expansion engines geared to twin propellers
- Speed: 18 knots (33 km/h; 21 mph)
- Capacity: 2,610 passengers total; 174 First Class; 492 Second Class; 1,944 Third Class
- Notes: Sister ship to RMS Laconia (1911)

RMS Franconia was a British ocean liner built for the Cunard Line, by Swan, Hunter & Wigham Richardson of Wallsend, England, and launched in 1910. Franconia mainly sailed on the line's Boston service, being the largest ship of the time to enter Boston harbor, while in winter she served as a cruise ship sailing from New York to the Mediterranean. She saw military service during World War I as a hospital ship and troopship and was sunk by a torpedo from a German U-boat in 1916.

Franconia was followed by a sister ship of the same design, RMS Laconia (1911), that was also lost in the war.

== Background ==
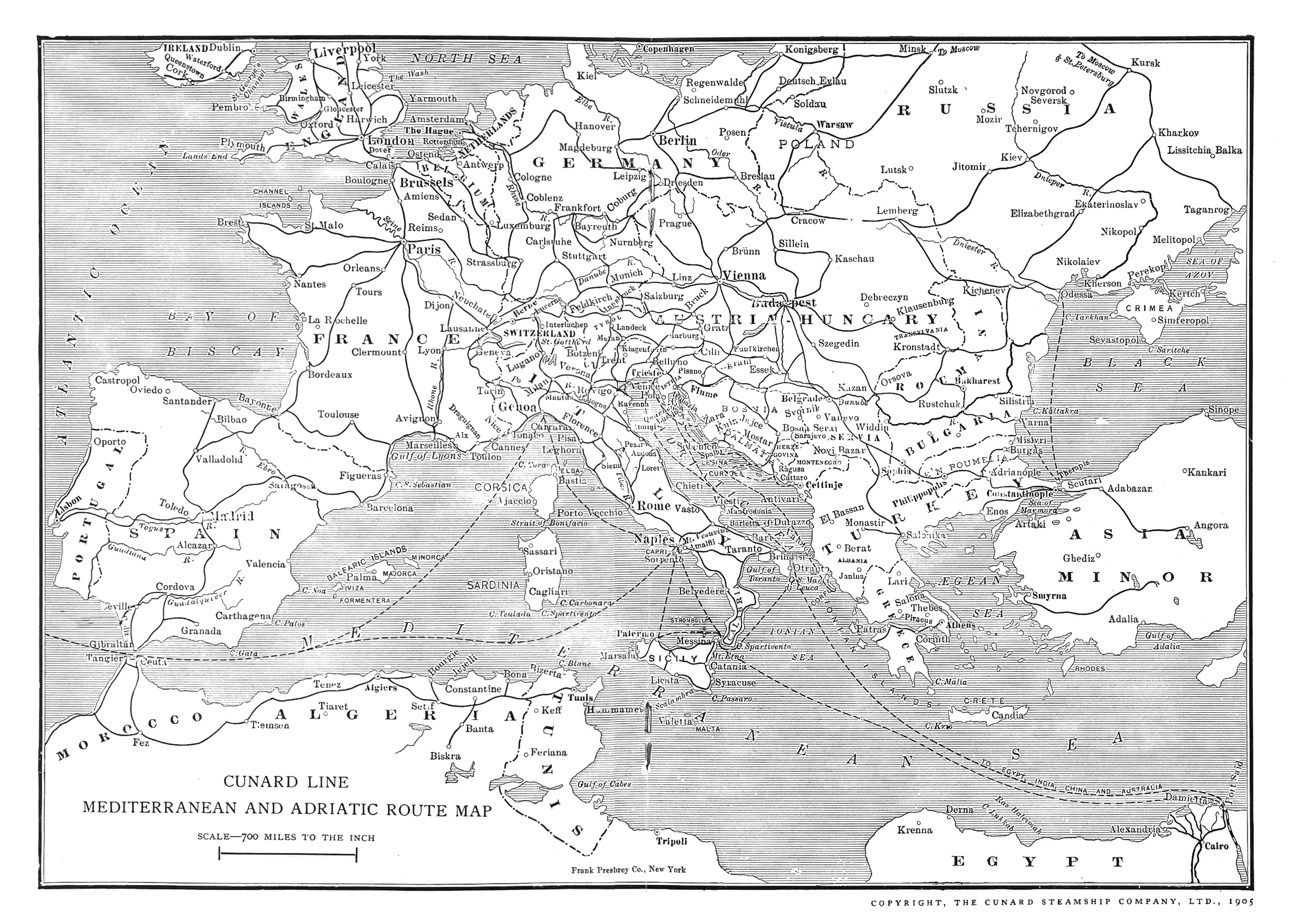
A Plan of Cunard Line's Adriatic and Mediterranean routes in 1905

Between 1900 and 1903, Cunard had replaced the ships that served its Liverpool to Boston passenger service, Catalonia, Cephalonia and Pavonia, with Ivernia, Saxonia and Carpathia. This more than doubled the gross register tonnage on the service. In 1903 Cunard became the official agents for Hungarian emigration, and Carpathia was placed on that route from Trieste and Fiume to New York. Cunard bought two new ships, RMS Pannonia and RMS Slavonia to support Carpathia on the route.

With only Ivernia and Saxonia regularly serving Boston for Cunard, the company ordered two larger ships, Franconia and Laconia, for the route. Like the existing pair, these would be 'intermediate' liners, and were more economical and did not consume much fuel for their speed, but they were not as luxurious or as speedy as the express liners Lusitania and Mauretania. Instead they focused on increased cargo space where the express liners would have had additional engine machinery and boilers.

With the increased capacity on their regular summer route across the Atlantic, all four ships, including Franconia, would be able to serve the Mediterranean themselves offering winter cruises and supplementing the emigrant trade. Slavonia was wrecked in 1909, so SS Ultonia also contributed to the Mediterranean emigrant sailings more frequently.

== Design and construction ==
=== Conception to launch ===
Construction began as the keel was first laid down on 8 October 1909 in the covered slipways of the shipbuilder's East Yard, following a design by Leonard Peskett, Cunard's chief naval architect.

The launch took place on 23 July 1910, with Lady Elizabeth Forwood, wife of the Cunard Director William Bower Forwood, christening the ship Franconia.

Franconia was placed in dry dock of John Readhead & Sons in Hebburn on the south bank of the Tyne on 13 January 1911. Her hull was painted over four days, before being released on 16 January and prepared to set out on her delivery voyage to Liverpool on 21 January. For her sea trials and delivery voyage, officials from Cunard and Swan, Hunter & Wigham Richardson joined the ship from North Shields in a fog. The dense fog impacted her sea trials, which made excessive speed more dangerous.

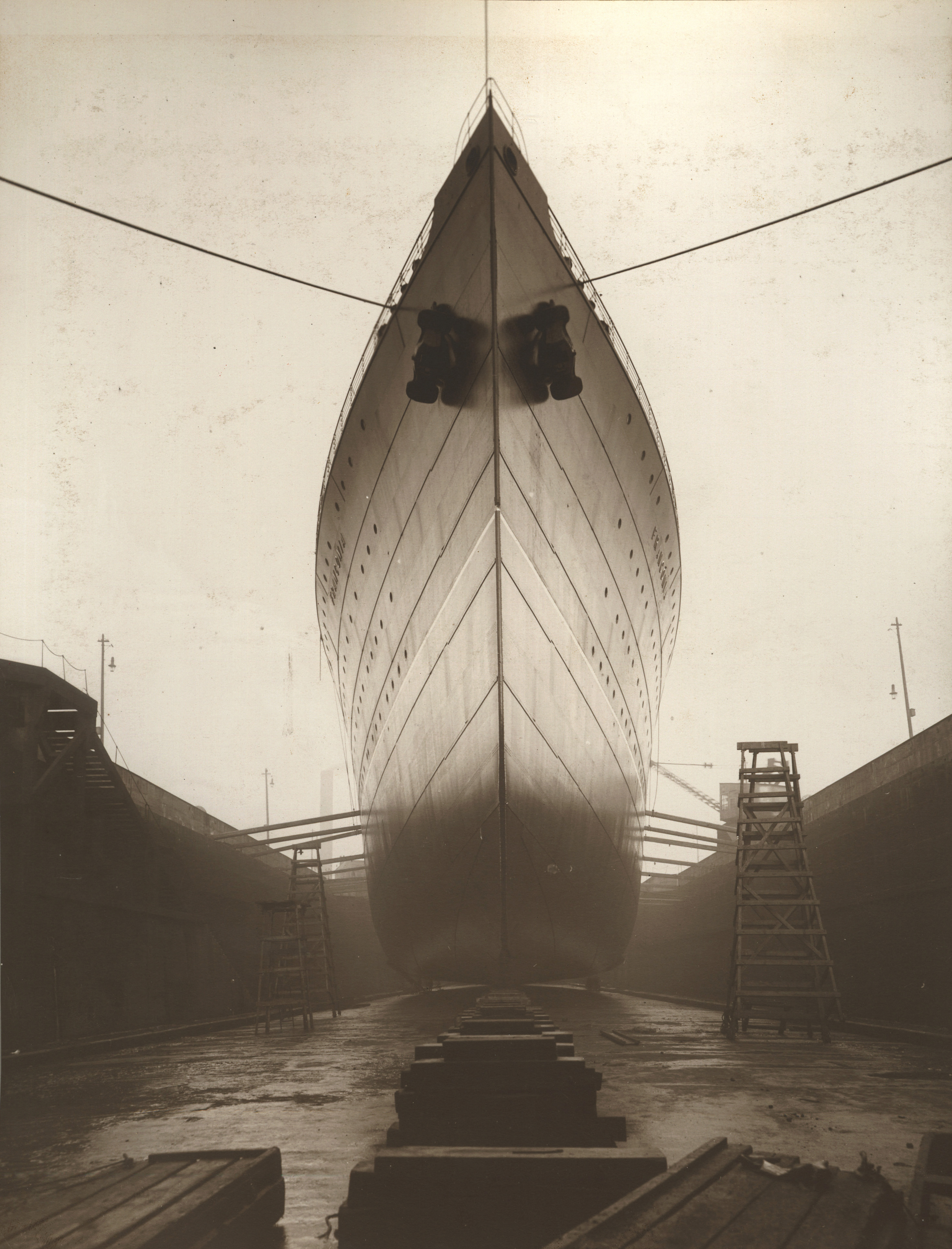
At dry dock in Hebburn, 1911

=== Deck plan ===
From top to bottom:

- Deckhouse Top, with the officers' quarters, officers' mess, chart room, and the wheel house.
- 'A' Deck / Boat Deck, containing the gymnasium, first class saloons, the captain's quarters, and access to lifeboats.
- 'B' Deck / Promenade Deck, containing first class cabins and access to additional lifeboats from the first class promenade.
- 'C' Deck / Bridge Deck or Saloon Deck, consisting of a main house accommodating first-class cabins, first and second class dining saloons, and second class cabins at the rear on a narrower deck house surrounded by the second class promenade.
- 'D' Deck / Shelter Deck, spanning the full length of the ship and mainly housed the second class passengers, with some third class passengers and a third class social hall at the front and an exposed weather deck at the rear.
- 'E' Deck / Upper Deck, fully enclosed and housed crew, and the third class promenade.
- 'F' Deck / Main Deck, which housed third class cabins and two large third class dining saloons.
- 'G' Deck / Lower Deck, third class cabins at the front followed by refrigerated goods up to the fourth bulkhead. Insulated stores between the sixth and seventh bulkheads containing the galley stores. Cargo storage from the tenth bulkhead to the rear of the ship.
- Orlop Deck, between the first and second bulkheads, housing further cargo.
- Two boiler rooms each sat behind a coal bunker in the middle of the ship. The engine room sat behind the rear boiler room on the Tank Top, the top of the double bottom. Cargo holds and ballast tanks fill out the remaining space.

The lower portion of the ship had 12 watertight bulkheads extending up to the Upper Deck, and dividing Franconia into 13 watertight compartments.

She was unusual, as she did not have staterooms on the uppermost passenger deck, instead she had a library, gymnasium and a lounge and smoking room.

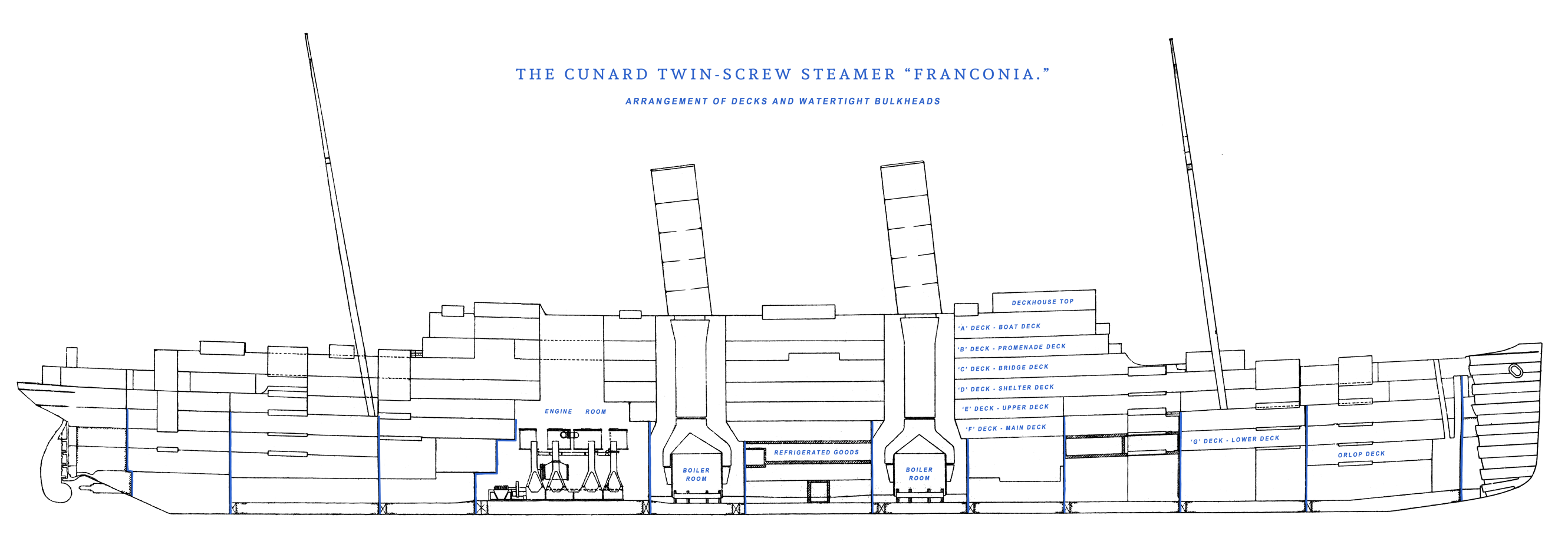
A longitudinal section plan of the Franconia at launch in 1910, showing deck and bulkhead layout

=== Lifeboats ===
At launch, Franconia was equipped with 16 clinker-built lifeboats, with 12 on the Boat Deck, and four lower down to the rear on the Promenade Deck. As was common at the time, and is now part of the regulations, lifeboats were given even numbers on the port side and odd numbers on the starboard side. They were numbered from 1 & 2 forward to 15 & 16 aft. Each boat was about 28 ft (8.5 m) long with a capacity of around 55–60 people. This meant Franconia had space for about 960 people in her boats, around a third of her maximum passenger capacity.

In 1912, following the sinking of the Titanic, the inquiry recommended large ocean liners provide lifeboats based on the number of passengers they carried instead of their GRT. This resulted in Franconia being given two additional wooden lifeboats on her forward Bridge Deck with new davits, bringing the total number under davits to 18. She also had a further 18 'collapsible' or 'decked' boats added, which were wooden or cork-bottomed boats with collapsible canvas sides, and these were mostly kept under the clinker-built boats. Boats 17 & 18 at the far rear of the Promenade Deck were placed onto a new raised platform above the deck, which also accommodated six of the collapsible boats.

Lifeboats 13 & 14 (later 15 & 16) on the rear promenade deck were used as emergency cutters. They were often left swung out during voyages to allow quick action in case of an incident like a man overboard.

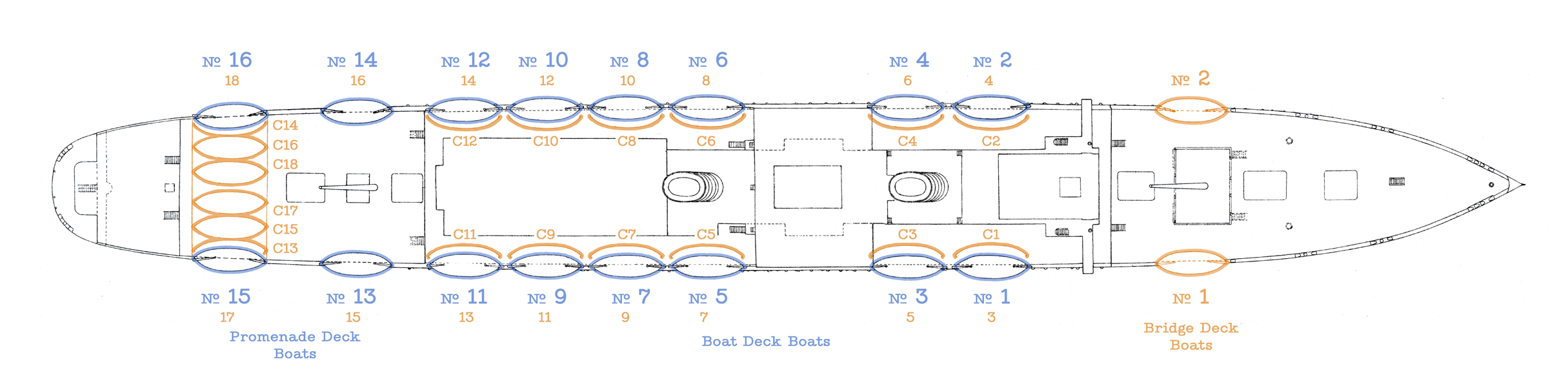
A plan of the lifeboats on RMS Franconia. The original lifeboats are in blue, additional lifeboats in orange.

=== Engines and propulsion ===
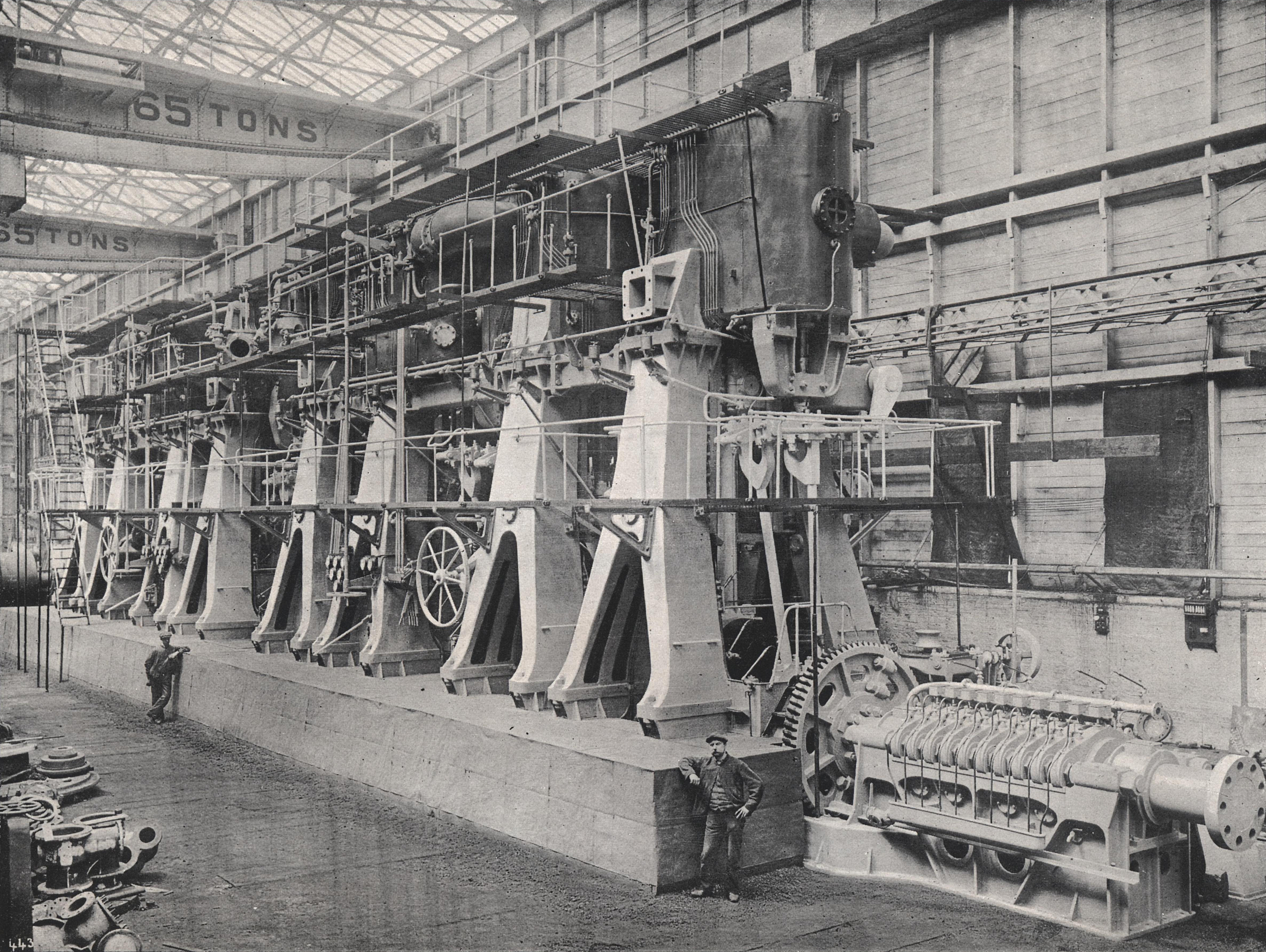
Quadruple-Expansion Engines of Franconia

The engines were designed and built by Wallsend Slipway & Engineering Company, neighbours and frequent collaborators with Swan, Hunter and Wigham Richardson on Tyneside, and managed by Andrew Laing.

These were quadruple-expansion steam engines designed on the Yarrow-Schlick-Tweedy system to reduce vibrations, with the engine cylinders being 33 inches (0.84 m), 47 inches (1.2 m), 67 inches (1.7 m), and 95 inches (2.4 m) from high pressure to low pressure. They ran with a stroke of 60 inches (1.5 m).

Franconia had two boiler rooms each with three double-ended scotch boilers that were 17.5 feet (5.3 m) in diameter and 21 feet (6.4 m) deep. Each set of three boilers were connected to an oval funnel that was 14.25 feet (4.34 m) by 9.25 feet (2.82 m) in shape and 59 feet (18 m) tall. The boilers delivered 210psi of pressure and were fed air by the Howden's forced draught system.

The propellers were driven through steel shafts supplied by W.G. Armstrong, Whitworth & Co and were directly driven by the engines. The propellers were made of manganese bronze and had four blades each.

For the comfort of the stokers and trimmers, fresh air was brought into the engine and boiler rooms using electrically-driven Sirocco fans from Davidson & Co of Belfast.

=== Auxiliary equipment ===
From launch, Franconia had an antenna for the Marconi wireless radio system strung between her masts. She had a wireless range of approximately 250 miles, and used the call sign 'MEA', inherited from RMS Etruria which was taken out of service in 1908. She had two Marconi operators and backup equipment on board, allowing radio service at all times using two shifts for safety and passenger convenience.

Submarine signalling equipment was installed on Franconia, to assist with navigation in fog. She had two hydrophone receivers installed in her bow to determine the direction of navigational aids such as lightships and bell buoys. This equipment was provided by Chance Brothers who supplied Franconia and her sister Laconia. The Chance Brothers variant of the system was not in wide use.

Three electrical dynamos installed behind the engine room driven by dedicated high-speed steam engines, supplying 400kW of electrical capacity. Nearly all the lighting on the ship was electric. This equipment was supplied by W.C. Martin & Co, who also provided electrical equipment for Mauretania.

Refrigeration machinery was installed between the two boiler rooms beneath the ship's refrigerated stores. This used carbonic anhydride (carbon dioxide) as its refrigerant in a two-stage compression cycle, cooling brine that was pumped around the ship to cool compartments insulated by granulated cork. This refrigeration equipment was manufactured by J & E Hall.

== Operational history ==
=== Commercial service ===
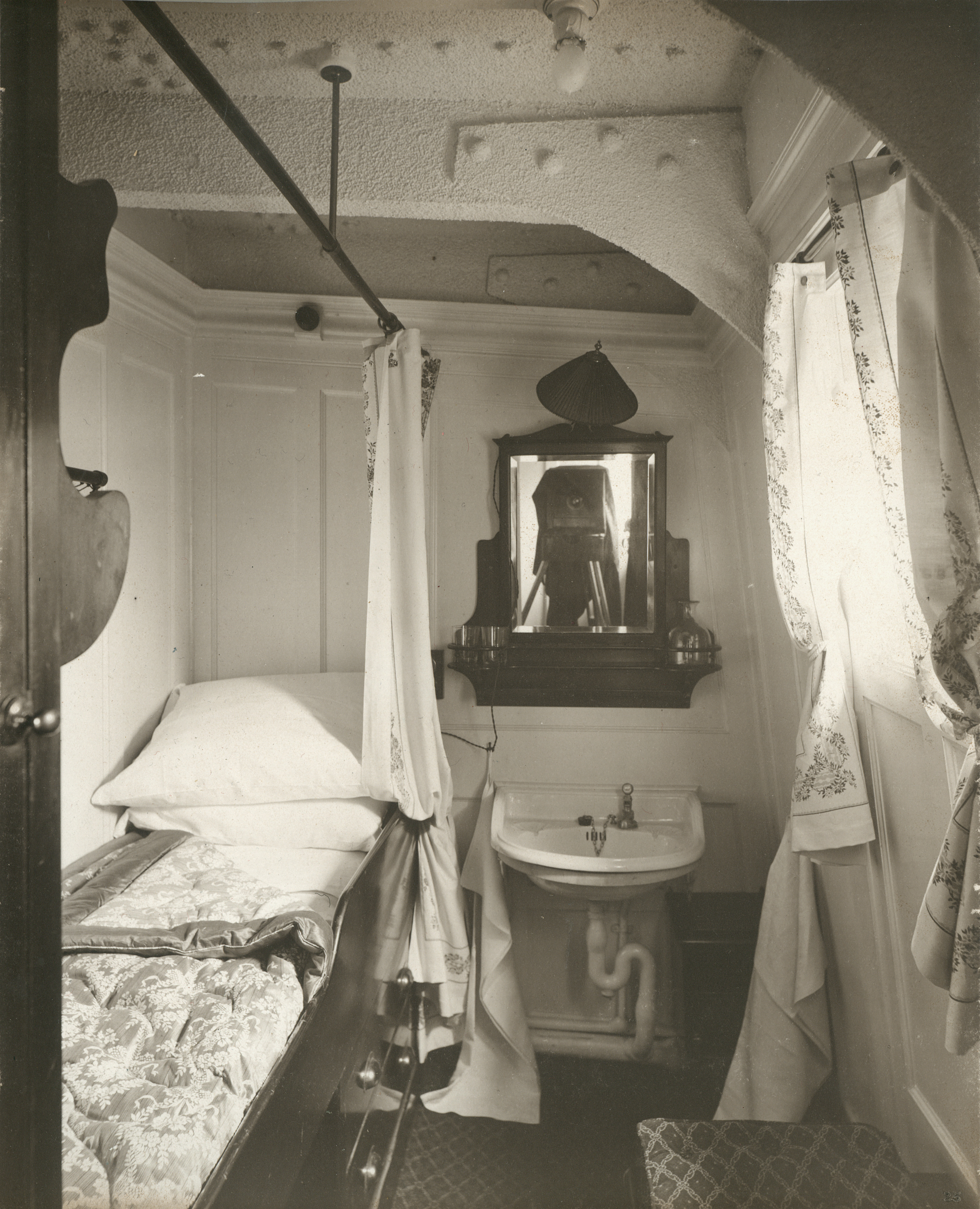
First Class single-berth room in 1910

Franconia undertook her maiden transatlantic voyage on 25 February 1911 from Liverpool to New York City under the command of Charles Appleton Smith. This voyage was continued from New York to the Mediterranean as part of Cunard's expansion into the emigrant trade, following success with RMS Carpathia on the route since 1904.

Her first voyage on her regular summer route from Liverpool to Boston began on 18 April 1911, after her return from New York and the Mediterranean.

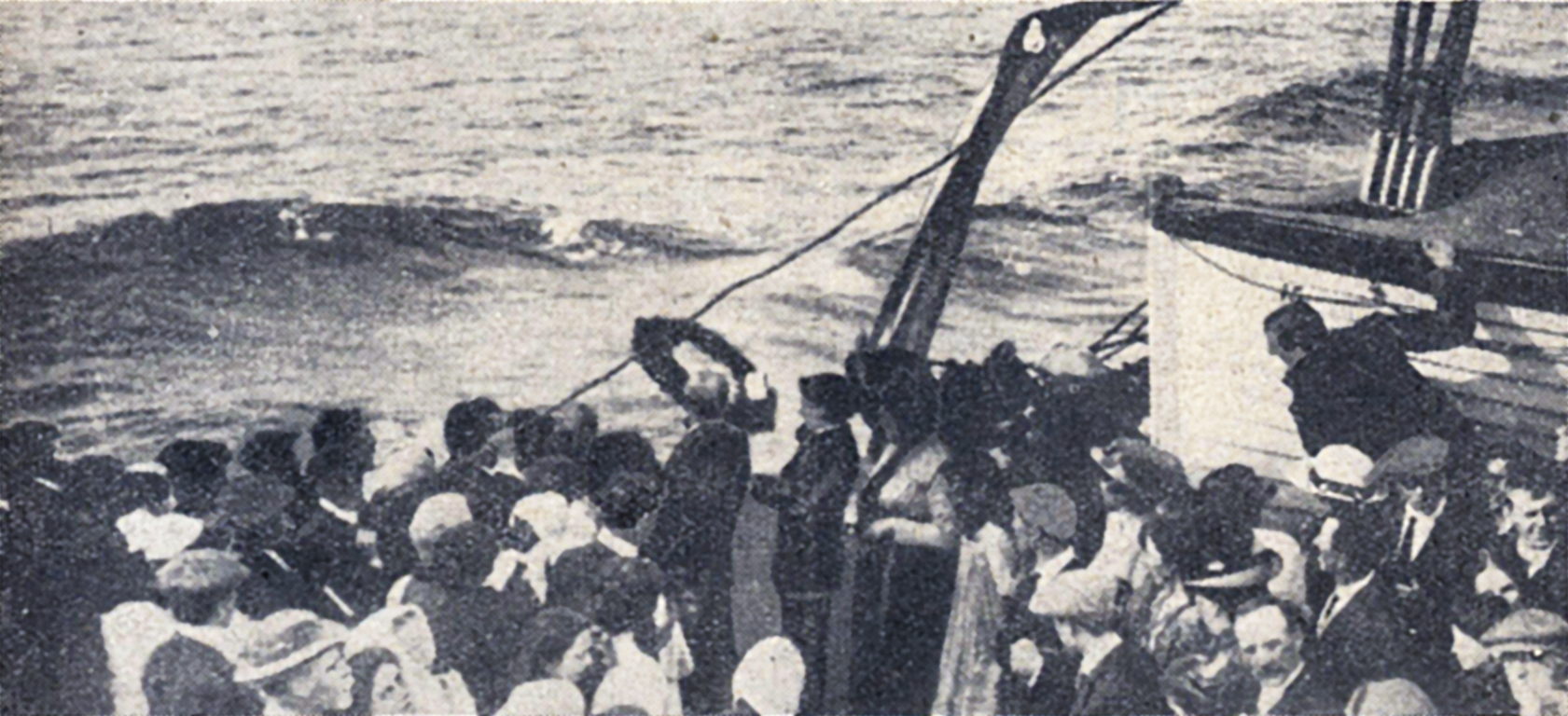
Passengers and crew of Franconia laying a wreath at the grave of Titanic

On 16 April 1912, on departing Boston, Franconia was ordered to take a more southerly route across the Atlantic to Liverpool, in order to avoid icebergs, due to the sinking of the Titanic the day before. The following day, Franconia made contact with RMS Carpathia by wireless radio. Carpathia was carrying survivors from the tragedy back to New York. A passenger on Franconia, Winfield Thomson, who was a journalist from the Boston Globe, was the first to report a nearly accurate number of survivors to shore. He reported 705 survivors. This number was met with disbelief, with newspapers like The Standard reasoning this figure must not include surviving crew. This number was in fact a close estimate of the true total of survivors, including crew, of 710.

In the summer of 1912, Franconia was noted to be in frequent wireless radio contact with Success, a former prison ship turned museum ship that was attempting an Atlantic crossing. Franconia passed her at least five times over the 66 days that Success had been at sea, and forwarded wireless messages to New York on behalf of Success for provisions that were running low on the old sailing ship.

Franconia halted in August 1913 at the site of the Titanic's sinking, to enable the family of Titanic passenger and newspaper editor W. T. Stead to have a wreath laid at the location he was lost.

She completed her final crossing from Liverpool to Boston on 22 September 1914, by which time she had carried 52,695 passengers westbound to Boston. Her final crossing from Liverpool to New York was completed on 1 February 1915 at which point she had carried 18,505 passengers to New York (7,096 on her Liverpool service, 11,409 on her Mediterranean service) for a combined total of 71,200 westbound passengers. Additionally, between Cunard's New York and Boston services, Franconia also carried 26,328 passengers eastbound to Liverpool.

=== World War I and sinking ===
While still in commercial service, Franconia was contracted by the British Admiralty to perform a troopship journey to Canada. She set out for New York on 16 September 1914 with regular commercial passengers for Cunard, but instead of returning across the Atlantic, she headed north. Here, Franconia would pick up members of the Canadian First Contingent of soldiers trained at Valcartier alongside her running mates Ivernia, Saxonia, and Laconia, and a number of other British and Canadian ocean liners.

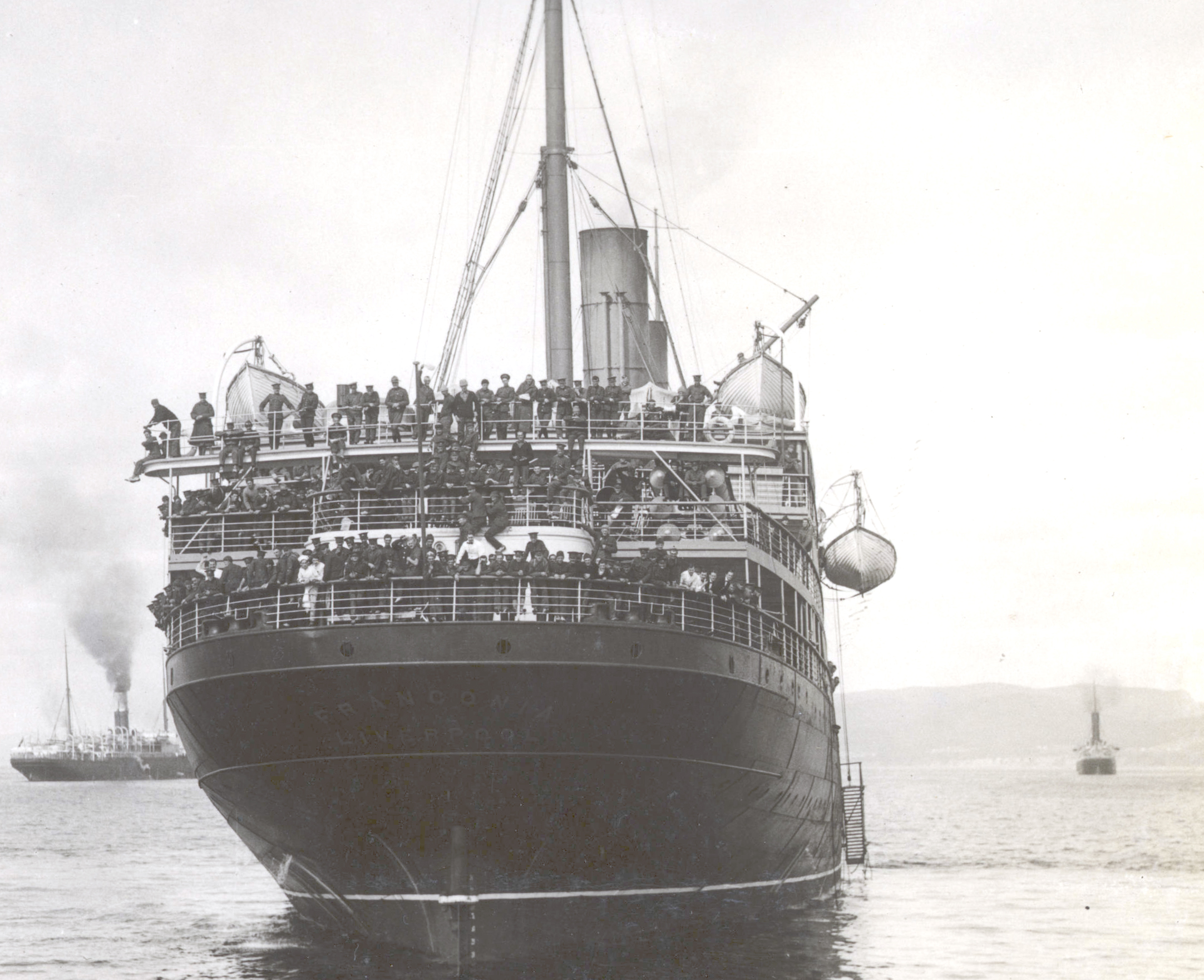
Franconia with Canadian Troops in Gaspé Harbour

The ships of this convoy first travelled to Montreal, Quebec, to be fitted out for carrying troops. They then proceeded to Quebec City to embark soldiers from Valcartier. Finally, the 31 merchant vessels gathered in Gaspé Bay, to form three columns for their journey across the Atlantic. They were escorted across the open ocean by HMS Glory and HMS Niobe, as well as the cruisers HMS Suffolk, HMS Essex, HMS Lancaster, and another of Franconia's Boston running-mates, RMS Caronia, which had been converted into an armed merchant cruiser. The 12th Cruiser Squadron provided an additional escort during the crossing, with HMS Charybdis, HMS Talbot, HMS Eclipse, and HMS Diana. The reinforcement was completed with the addition of HMS Majestic. Finally, for the last stretch of the crossing, the battlecruiser HMS Princess Royal.

Franconia was taken into service as a hospital ship in early 1915 and sailed to Alexandria from the Dardanelles.

She had evaded a torpedo from a torpedo boat of the Ottoman Navy and transported headquarters staff early in her war service.

In June 1915, a seaman from Franconia was sentenced to three months imprisonment with hard labour for failing to join the ship. He expressed sorrow and claimed he was drunk. Around 30 men in total failed to join, which delayed her departure carrying troops to the Dardanelles, prompting the Admiralty to make an example of the seamen.

On 4 October 1916, while heading for Salonika, she was torpedoed and sunk by the German U-boat UB-47 195 miles (314 km) east of Malta. She was not carrying any troops but out of her 314 crew members, 12 died. One of those lost was a boilermaker, one a greaser, four were firemen/stokers and six were trimmers. The others were saved by the hospital ship HMHS Dover Castle. The surviving crew returned home to Liverpool on 24 October.

== Legacy ==
Cunard Line named two further ships Franconia in the decades after the sinking of the original ship.

The second Franconia was launched in 1922, and was a Scythia-class ship built by John Brown & Co in Clydebank. Like her 1910 counterpart, the 1922 Franconia also had a sister named Laconia, that was built by Swan, Hunter and Wigham Richardson like her predecessor.

The third Franconia was originally launched in 1954 as RMS Ivernia. This Ivernia (the second Cunard ship of this name, the first being Ivernia of 1899) was substantially refit in 1963, and so significant were the changes she was renamed Franconia.
