= RMS Ivernia (1899) =

1899 British ocean liner built for the Cunard Line

Coordinates: 35°42′N 23°19′E

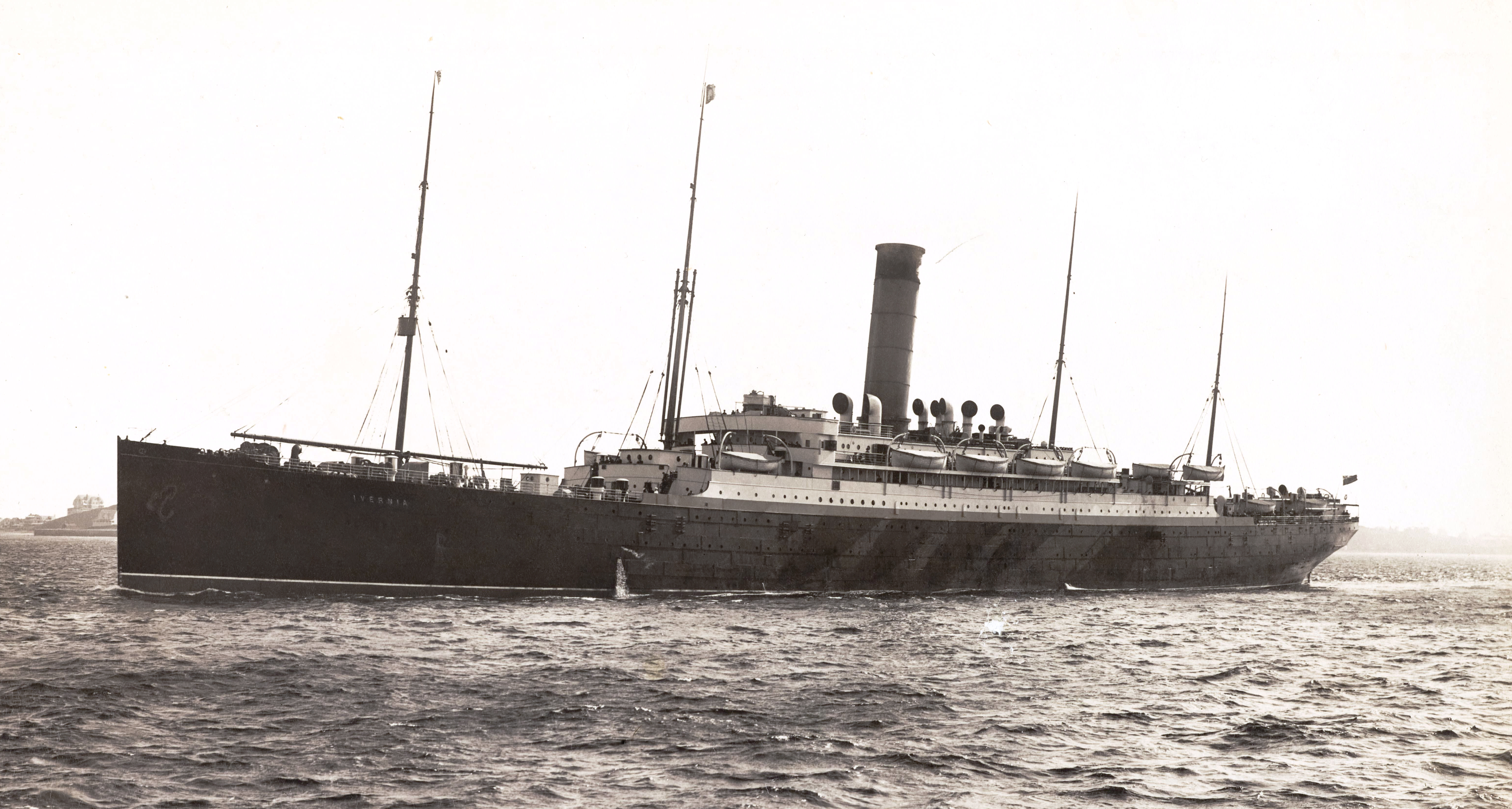
- Cunard Liner Ivernia

History

United Kingdom
- Name: RMS Ivernia
- Namesake: Iverni
- Owner: Cunard Line
- Operator: Cunard Line
- Port of registry: Liverpool, United Kingdom
- Route: 1900–1911; Liverpool–Boston; Liverpool–New York City; 1911–1914; Liverpool–Boston; Liverpool–New York City; Trieste/Fiume–New York City; 1914–1917; Government war service
- Builder: C. S. Swan & Hunter, Wallsend, England
- Yard number: 247
- Laid down: 6 December 1898
- Launched: 21 September 1899
- Sponsored by: Emma, Countess of Ravensworth
- Maiden voyage: 14 April 1900, Liverpool to New York
- Refit: July–October 1911; following major flooding from a collision
- Identification: UK Official Number 110643; Code letters "RNJD"; Marconi Radio Call Letters "MIA"
- Fate: Torpedoed and sunk, 1 January 1917
- Notes: Completed deep-sea trials 27 March 1900, off Liverpool

General characteristics
- Type: Ocean liner
- Tonnage: Designed; 13,900 GRT; Before refit; 14,058 GRT; 9,052 NRT; After refit; 14,278 GRT; 9,165 NRT
- Displacement: 24,400 long tons
- Length: 600 ft (183 m) total; 582 ft (177 m) between perpendiculars
- Beam: 64.5 ft (19.7 m)
- Height: 140 ft (43 m) from keel to top of funnel
- Draught: 31.6 ft (9.6 m)
- Depth: 41.6 ft (12.7 m) (depth moulded to Upper Deck)
- Decks: 6 passenger decks; 8 decks overall
- Installed power: 9 single-ended scotch boilers; Steam pressure of 210psi; 12,000 indicated horsepower
- Propulsion: Steam quadruple-expansion engines geared to twin propellers
- Speed: 16.8 knots (31.1 km/h; 19.3 mph) (achieved on trials); 16.25 knots (30.10 km/h; 18.70 mph) (contract stipulation)
- Capacity: 1,964 passengers; (164 First Class, 200 Second Class, 1,600 Third Class)
- Notes: Sister ship to RMS Saxonia (1899); Half-sister to RMS Carpathia

RMS Ivernia was a British ocean liner built for the Cunard Line by C. S. Swan & Hunter of Wallsend, England, and launched in 1899. The Ivernia was one of Cunard's intermediate ships that catered to the vast immigrant trade between Europe and the United States of America in the early 20th century. She saw military service during World War I and was sunk by a torpedo from a German U-boat on New Year's Day 1917.

Ivernia was the first of three related liners of the Ivernia class. Saxonia was her larger sister ship, and was launched three months after her at John Brown & Company of Clydebank, leaving Ivernia the largest Cunard steamer during those months. Carpathia, later to be made famous for rescuing the survivors of the Titanic disaster, was a smaller half-sister of Ivernia and Saxonia, built at the same yard as Ivernia and launched in 1902, to a modified design based on her older half-sisters.

== Background ==
In the late 1890s Cunard had only a small number of vessels running on the transatlantic trade, with Catalonia, Cephalonia and Pavonia operating the passenger service on the Boston route. These were introduced in the early 1880s and were around 5,000 GRT each.

In 1893 Cunard had also introduced RMS Lucania and RMS Campania as fast express liners between Liverpool and New York, with these winning the Blue Riband speed record, but this was later won by Kaiser Wilhelm der Grosse of the Norddeutscher Lloyd line in 1897.

White Star Line had also recently introduced the liners Georgic and Cymric. These were known as 'intermediate' liners, and were economical and did not consume much fuel for their speed, but they were not as luxurious or as speedy as the German record-holders or British express liners. Instead they focused on increased cargo space where the express liners would have had additional engine machinery and boilers.

Cunard decided to follow White Star Line in producing smaller, more profitable liners of more moderate speed, oriented at the Liverpool–Boston service, to replace Catalonia, Cephalonia, and Pavonia. These were the Ivernia-class: Ivernia, Saxonia and the later, smaller Carpathia. These followed the smaller Ultonia which was the first new liner on the route.

== Design and construction ==
=== Conception to launch ===
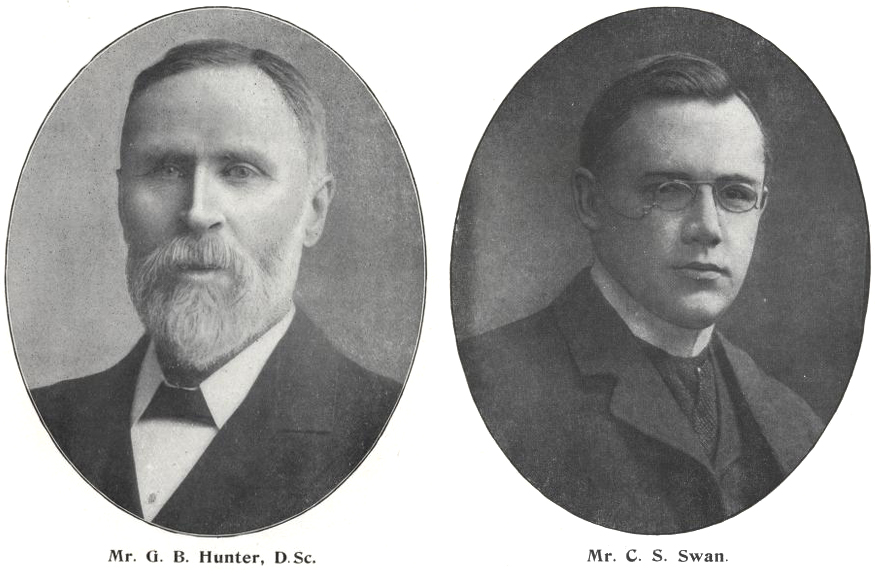
Shipbuilders G B Hunter and C S Swan (Jr) in 1907

In 1898, the Cunard Line commissioned C. S. Swan & Hunter, based on the North bank of the River Tyne in Wallsend, to construct one of two new intermediate-sized liners intended to work the Liverpool-Boston route across the North Atlantic. She would target 16 knots (30 km/h; 18 mph) compared to Lucania's 21 knots (39 km/h; 24 mph).

Cunard produced a plan on 3 August 1898 at their Derby Road works in Liverpool to accompany a contract specification for Swan & Hunter, and this was reviewed by William Denton, director of the yard, three days later with some adjustments that led to the appearance of Ivernia diverging from that of her sister Saxonia. The design was of a 580 ft (180 m) vessel with passenger and cargo capacity over 8 decks.

On 6 December 1898, the keel of Ivernia was laid in the west slipway of a large shed in the shipbuilder's East Yard. Alongside her were two other ships already under construction, the 500 ft (150 m) Ultonia and the smaller 460 ft (140 m) SS Idaho on the slipways to Ivernia's east. All three slipways were equipped with electric overhead cranes, which were a new innovation in the shipbuilding industry.

Construction was rapid and nine months later, on 21 September 1899, Ivernia was christened by Emma, Countess of Ravensworth and released into the Tyne. The fitting out quay was by the slipways, and work continued into early 1900 to complete the superstructure and fit Ivernia's machinery, including her engines and boilers.

=== Deck plan ===
From top to bottom:

- Deckhouse Top, with the chart room, a glass dome lighting the first class saloon, and the wheel house.
- Promenade Deck, containing first class saloons and access to lifeboats.
- Bridge Deck, 280 ft (85 m) long and consisting of a main house accommodating first-class cabins, a separate rear house for second-class cabins, and a small forward house for the officers' mess.
- Shelter Deck, spanning the full length of the ship and mainly housed the second class passengers, along with the first and second class dining saloons within a central house under the Bridge Deck.
- Upper Deck, fully enclosed and housed crew, some cargo, and the third class promenade.
- Main Deck, which housed third class cabins forward, and third class dormitory accommodation aft.
- Lower Deck, housing cargo and refrigerated goods.
- Orlop Deck, forward of the boiler room only, housing further cargo and refrigerated goods.
- Tank Top, with the Boiler room and engine room sat back-to-back in the middle of the ship on top of the double bottom, and between deep cargo and ballast holds forward and aft.

The lower portion of the ship had 10 watertight bulkheads extending up to the Upper Deck, and dividing Ivernia into 11 watertight compartments. The ship was designed to stay afloat with any two of her compartments flooded.

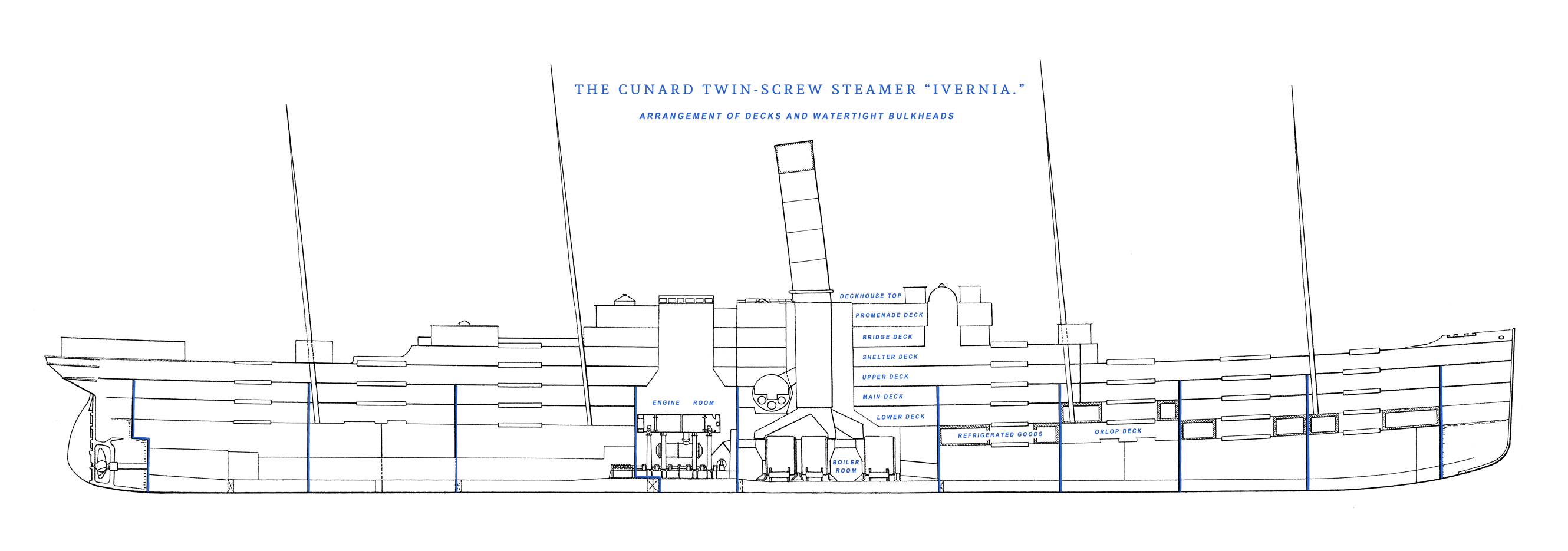
A longitudinal section plan of the Ivernia at launch in 1899, showing deck and bulkhead layout

=== Rigging ===
Four staysails and two jibs were included in the rigging plan for Ivernia. Sails were unlikely to see use on twin-propeller steamships of this era, and would not have been able to propel the large steel ship.

Once installed, the antenna for the Marconi wireless radio system was strung between the masts of Ivernia. The halyard that would have originally been between these masts, allowing signal flags to be hoisted from the bridge, would have been moved lower on the second mast.

=== Lifeboats ===
At launch, Ivernia was equipped with 18 lifeboats, with 8 on the Promenade Deck, two just forward of the bridge on the Bridge Deck, four atop the second class accommodation on the Bridge Deck (paired and served by only two, not four, davits), and four at the aft of the Shelter Deck.

As was common at the time, and is now part of the regulations, lifeboats were given even numbers on the port side and odd numbers on the starboard side. They were numbered from 1 & 2 aft to 17 & 18 forward.

Each boat was about 28 ft (8.5 m) long with a capacity of around 55-60 people. This meant Ivernia had space for about 1,050 people in her boats, less than half her maximum passenger capacity.

Lifeboats 5 & 6 above the second class cabins at the rear of the bridge deck were used as emergency cutters. They were often left swung out during voyages to allow quick action in case of an incident like a man overboard.

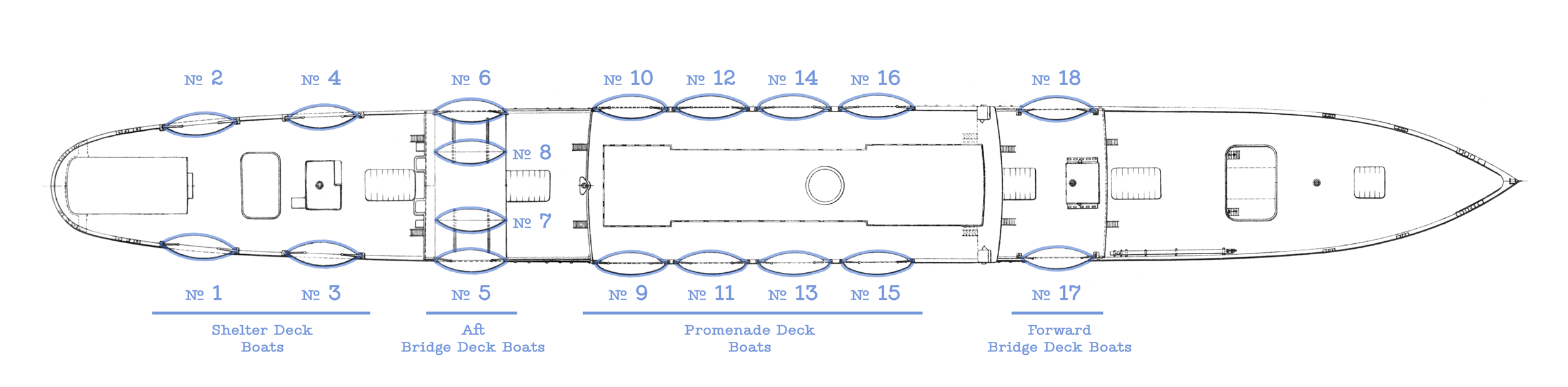
A plan of the lifeboats on RMS Ivernia. Boats 5 and 6 were often left swung out over the water when the ship was underway to enable a quick deployment in an emergency.

=== Power and propulsion ===
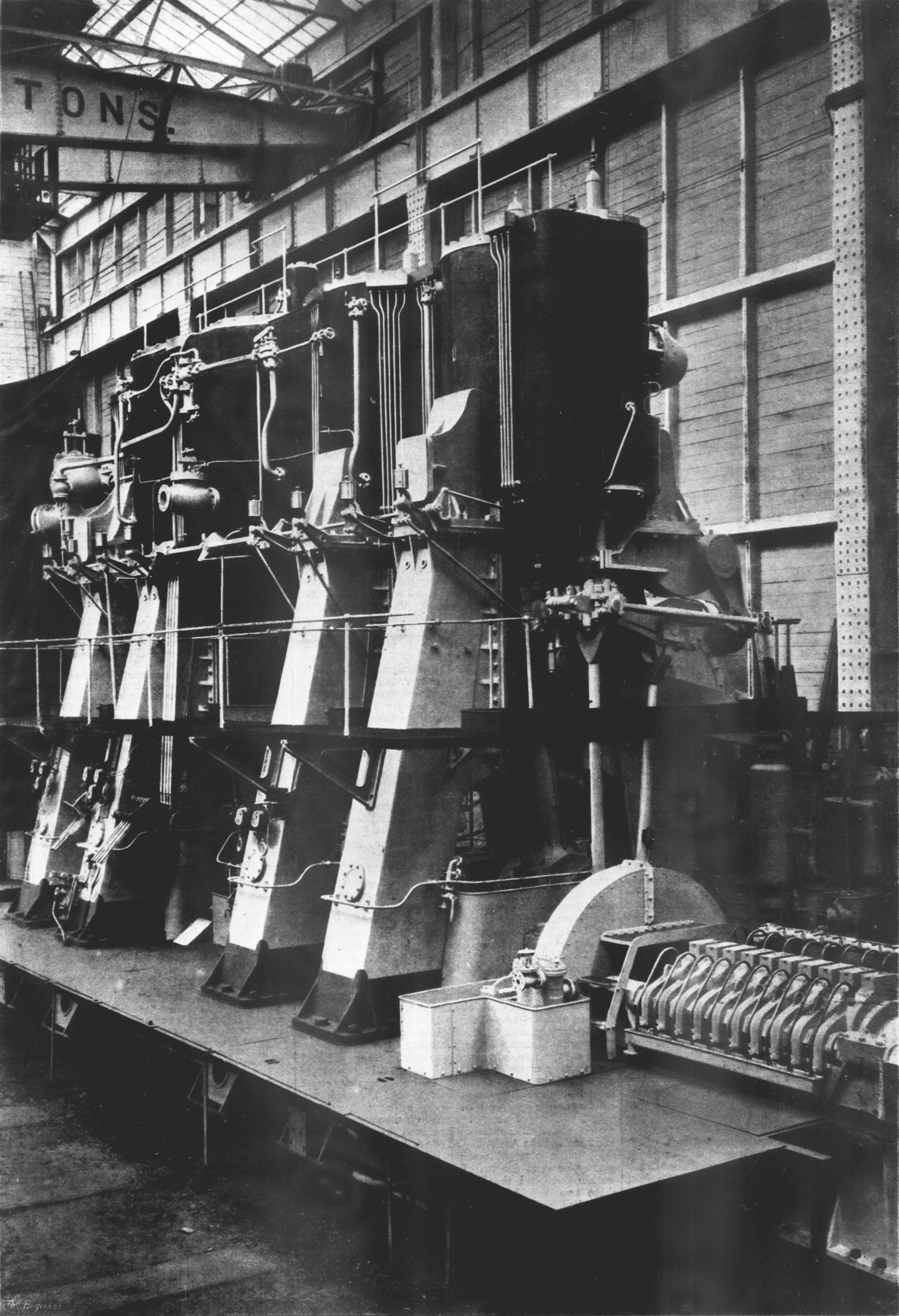
Quadruple Expansion Engines of the RMS Ivernia, at Wallsend Slipway in 1899

The engines were designed and built by Wallsend Slipway & Engineering Company, neighbours of C. S. Swan & Hunter on Tyneside, and were quadruple-expansion engines. The designer was Andrew Laing, who also designed the triple-expansion engines that powered the RMS Lucania to capture the Blue Riband accolade for fastest average speed crossing the Atlantic in 1894. The quadruple-expansion design could output 12,000 indicated horsepower, with cylinders of 28, 41, 58.5, and 84 inches in diameter, from high to low pressure, and a common stroke of 54 inches. These were fed by nine single-ended scotch boilers 15.5 ft (4.7 m) in diameter and 11.5 ft (3.5 m) deep and equipped with the Howden forced draught system with air drawn into the furnaces with use of a fan. The two engines were connected by Armstrong Whitworth shafts to twin three-bladed manganese bronze propellers on a pair of steel bosses.

Starting and reversing of the direction of the propeller shaft was conducted by a separate, small engine. An additional larger donkey boiler was situated behind the funnel across the Main and Upper decks to provide steam for deck machinery and other uses.

These engines allowed Ivernia to achieve a speed of 16.8 knots when completing her deep-sea trials in late March 1900, after fitting-out was complete. This exceeded the design contract stipulation of a 16.25 knots top speed, and made Ivernia the fastest of the three sisters.

Electric lighting throughout the ship was fed from a dynamo generator providing direct current from a dynamo room just behind the funnel on the Upper Deck.

=== Sister ship design differences ===
==== Saxonia ====
At the same time Ivernia was ordered from C S Swan & Hunter, Cunard also ordered an identical sister from John Brown & Company of Clydebank, Glasgow. The sister, named Saxonia, was launched on 16 December 1899, 87 days after the launch of Ivernia.

By the time she launched, Saxonia was visually similar to Ivernia, but was no longer identical. She was also 580 ft (180 m) in length although three inches narrower at 64.25 ft (19.58 m) in breadth. The most visible difference between the sisters was Saxonia's raised navigating bridge, spanning her full width, rising one deck level above the bridge of Ivernia, and featuring more curves. This more prominent bridge was part of the original design specification from Cunard, which C S Swan & Hunter chose to modify on Ivernia but was left unchanged on Saxonia.

Other key differences include the greater size of the Bridge Deck forward deck house on Saxonia, and raised platforms for lifeboats not on the Promenade Deck.

==== Carpathia ====
Following the success of Ivernia and Saxonia, Cunard commissioned another intermediate liner of the same type from Ivernia's builders. She was launched on 6 August 1902 and was named Carpathia.

Carpathia differed from both her sisters significantly, making her a half-sister. She was only 540 ft (160 m) in length between perpendiculars and 64.25 ft (19.58 m) in breadth, making her the smallest of the three. Her Bridge Deck was 10 ft (3.0 m) longer than the 280 ft (85 m) central superstructure of her older sisters at 290 ft (88 m). She also had a shorter uppermost Boat Deck with no passenger facilities, where her sisters had Promenade Decks hosting first class passenger amenities, effectively making Carpathia one deck shorter and lowering the base of her funnel by about 8 ft (2.4 m)

The navigating bridge of Carpathia resembled that of her yard-sister Ivernia, being straighter in shape and shorter than that of Saxonia. She had raised lifeboat platforms on her aft Shelter Deck, like Saxonia.

She also had less powerful engines than her sisters with only seven to her sisters' nine boilers, smaller engine cylinders, and a lower top speed.

== Operational history ==
=== Early history ===
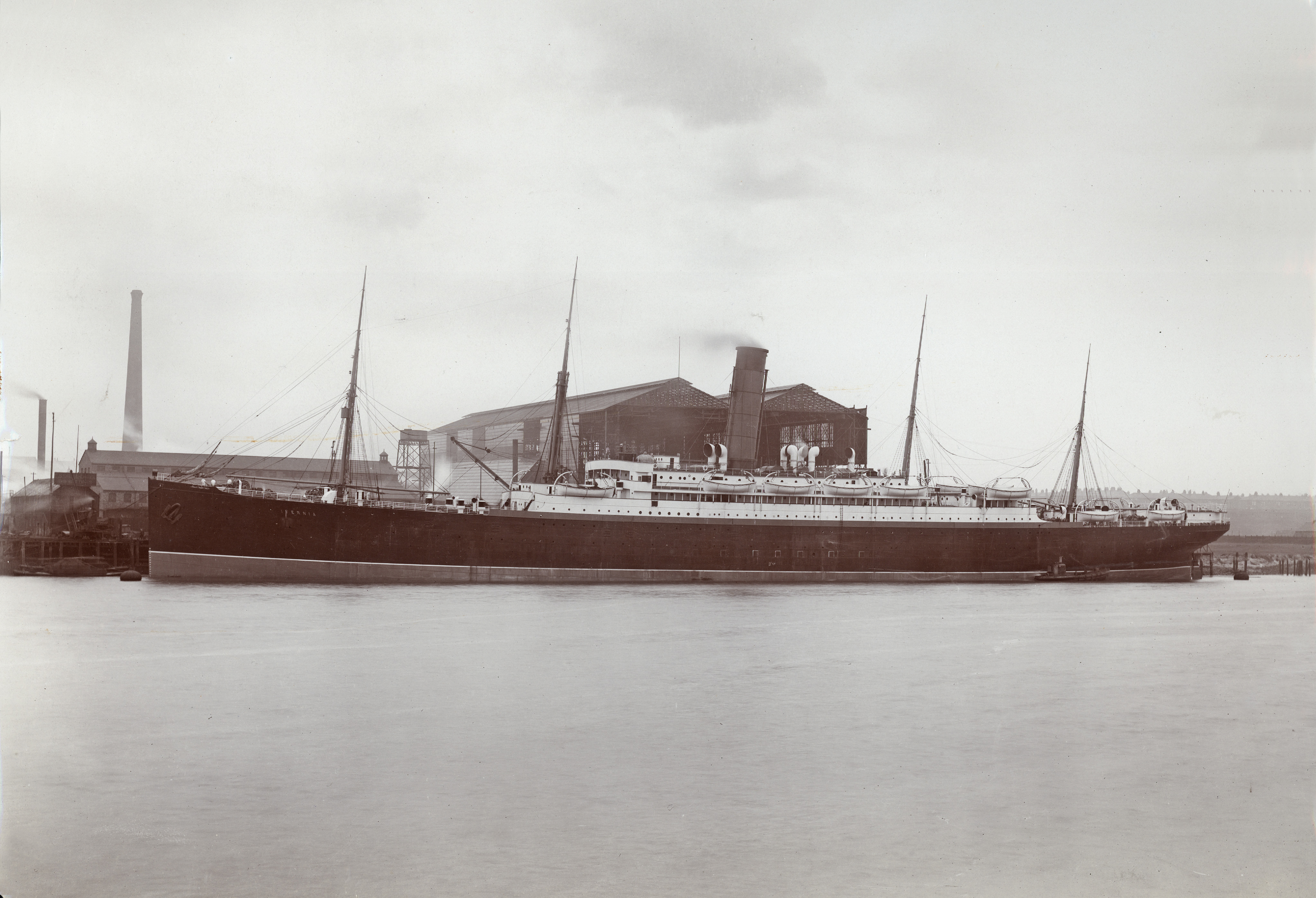
Ivernia being fitted out in 1900

Ivernia arrived on the River Mersey on 27 March 1900, after a five-day journey from the Tyne, and her passengers complimented her stability in rough weather during her delivery voyage.

Ivernia undertook her maiden transatlantic voyage on 14 April 1900 from Liverpool to New York City, as the liners that were intended to work that route were conducting troop transport duties for the Second Boer War. On board for this maiden voyage was Charles Sheriton Swan, son of Charles Sheridan Swan, co-founder of the builder's yard. Two months later, on 12 June, the Ivernia began working on Cunard's service from Liverpool to Boston, together with her sister ship RMS Saxonia.

=== Wireless ===
In 1901, Cunard began outfitting its ships with a Marconi wireless system, beginning with RMS Lucania on 21 May, followed by RMS Campania, RMS Umbria and RMS Etruria.

With a longer-than-usual stopover in Liverpool of 14 days between February 4 & 18 1902, construction of a hut for a wireless operator would have been possible in preparation for Ivernia's Marconi equipment. Two months later, Ivernia arrived from Boston on April 10, when the Cunard engineers at Liverpool had the opportunity to complete the fitting of the wireless apparatus. Ivernia sailed with a Marconi system installed and operational for the first time on 15 April 1902, with her first broadcast from 30 miles off shore reporting "All well" back to Liverpool.

In 1909, sending a message to the United States from Ivernia would cost a passenger 8s. 4d. for a ten-word message, or 6s for 12 words to the UK.

=== Daunt Rock incident ===
Ivernia departed Boston on a routine voyage on 16 May 1911, under the command of Captain Thomas Potter, and was approaching Queenstown harbour on 24 May. Heavy fog closed in around noon, and she struck Daunt Rock only 9 mi (14.48 km) from the port. The forward hull of the ship was badly damaged in multiple places, but Ivernia successfully made it into the inner harbour while taking on water. All passengers were disembarked to Queenstown while Ivernia was at anchor in the Kinloch Channel, but as dusk approached and the forward holds continued to take on water, Captain Potter made the decision to have the ship towed to the mud banks near Corkbeg Island on the eastern side of the harbour. Divers assessed the damage, and powerful pumps brought aboard, but the water continued to slowly rise. The Admiralty tug Hellespont, as well as the tugs Flying Fox and Flying Sportsman of the Clyde Shipping Company, assisted with the tow. The Clyde company later secured £1,000 for the work, through the courts, from Cunard, who also made a voluntary award of £500 to the captain and crew of Hellespont.

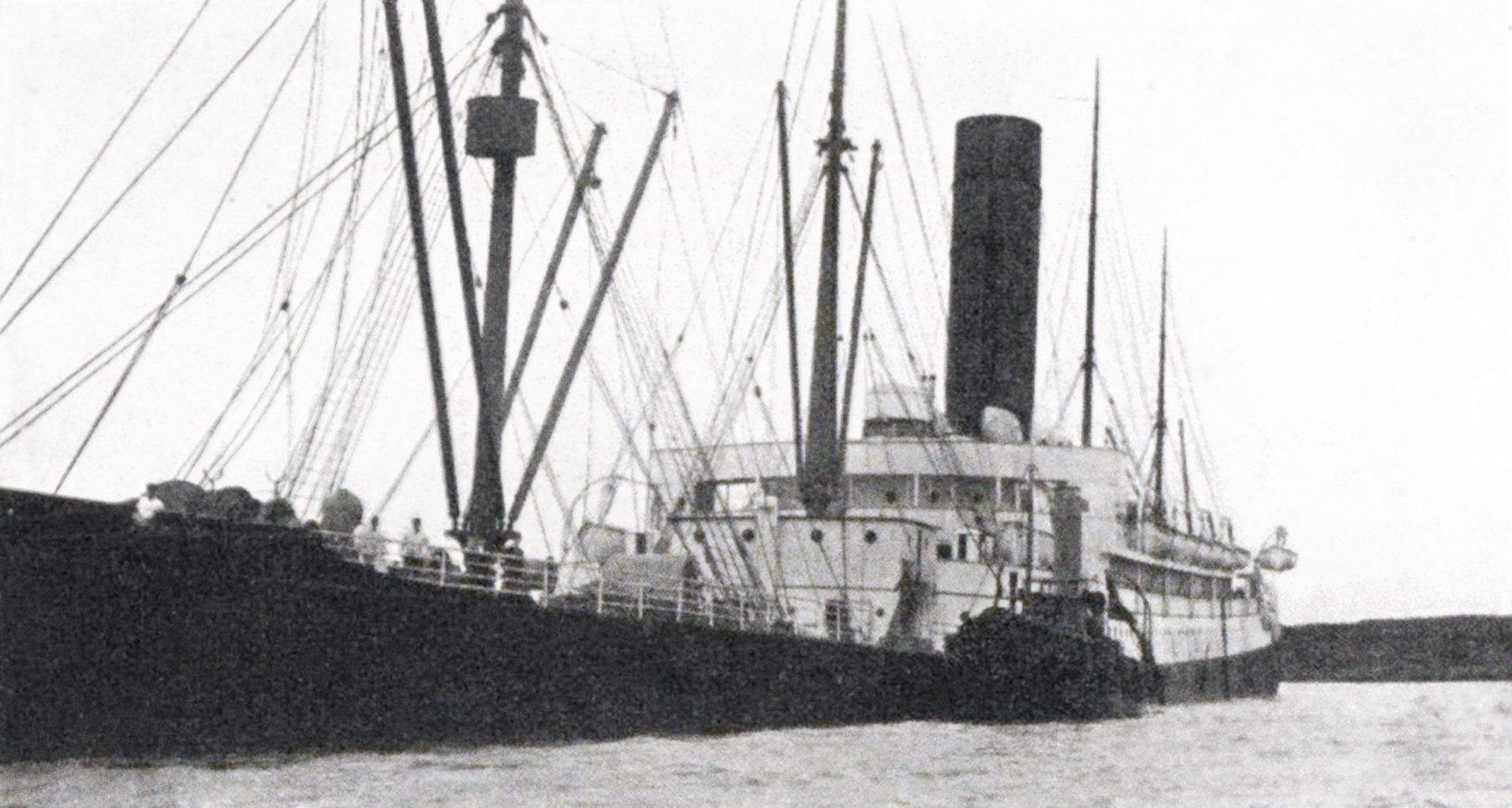
RMS Ivernia grounded in Queenstown Harbour in June 1911

728 passengers were on board at the time of the accident, and the crew were able to remain on board throughout the salvage process. An unnamed first-class passenger reported feeling the impact in the smoking room, and emerged onto the deck to see the Captain and officers calmly discussing the matter at the bridge. So calm was the atmosphere that lunch was still served, with an orchestra playing for entertainment. Nevertheless, it was apparent to the passenger that the ship was slowly sinking by the head.

Lloyd's Register surveyor Herbert W Dove inspected the ship on 1 June, and reported flooding as high as the Main Deck and even the Shelter Deck at high water.

Nearly a month after she struck the reef, Ivernia was successfully refloated on 23 June 1911, the pumps finally able to keep pace with incoming water enough to enable temporary repair.

A Board of Trade Inquiry found that Captain Potter was responsible for the accident, finding him guilty of "navigating the vessel at too great a rate of speed in increasingly thick weather". They were satisfied that the course set for the vessel was appropriate, but that the compass was at fault for leading the ship toward Daunt Rock. The court decided Captain Potter's master's certificate did not need to be revoked, allowing him to continue captaining vessels, but he was "censured" and made to pay £50 (equivalent to £5,092 in 2025) toward the cost of the inquiry. However, on 8 July an address was read out, signed by prominent figures from Cork and Queenstown, praising Captain Potter's success in handling the incident and his skill in sailing the stricken vessel to port, avoiding both loss of life and loss of the vessel herself.

The still-damaged liner departed Queenstown for Liverpool under her own steam on 6 July, accompanied by tugs and salvage vessels from the Liverpool Salvage Association that had assisted in refloating her. Ivernia was placed in Brocklebank Graving Dock in Liverpool, and Cunard staff began refitting and furnishing the ship. The ship repairers, H & C Grayson Ltd, were assigned the task of repairing the structural damage.

Ivernia returned to service on 17 October 1911, with much of her interior refitted, with William R D Irvine in command, and carrying 872 passengers out of Liverpool to Queenstown and Boston. After a single voyage, Captain Irvine handed command to Horace Mills Benison, who would become the longest serving master of Ivernia and oversee her Mediterranean service.

=== Mediterranean service ===
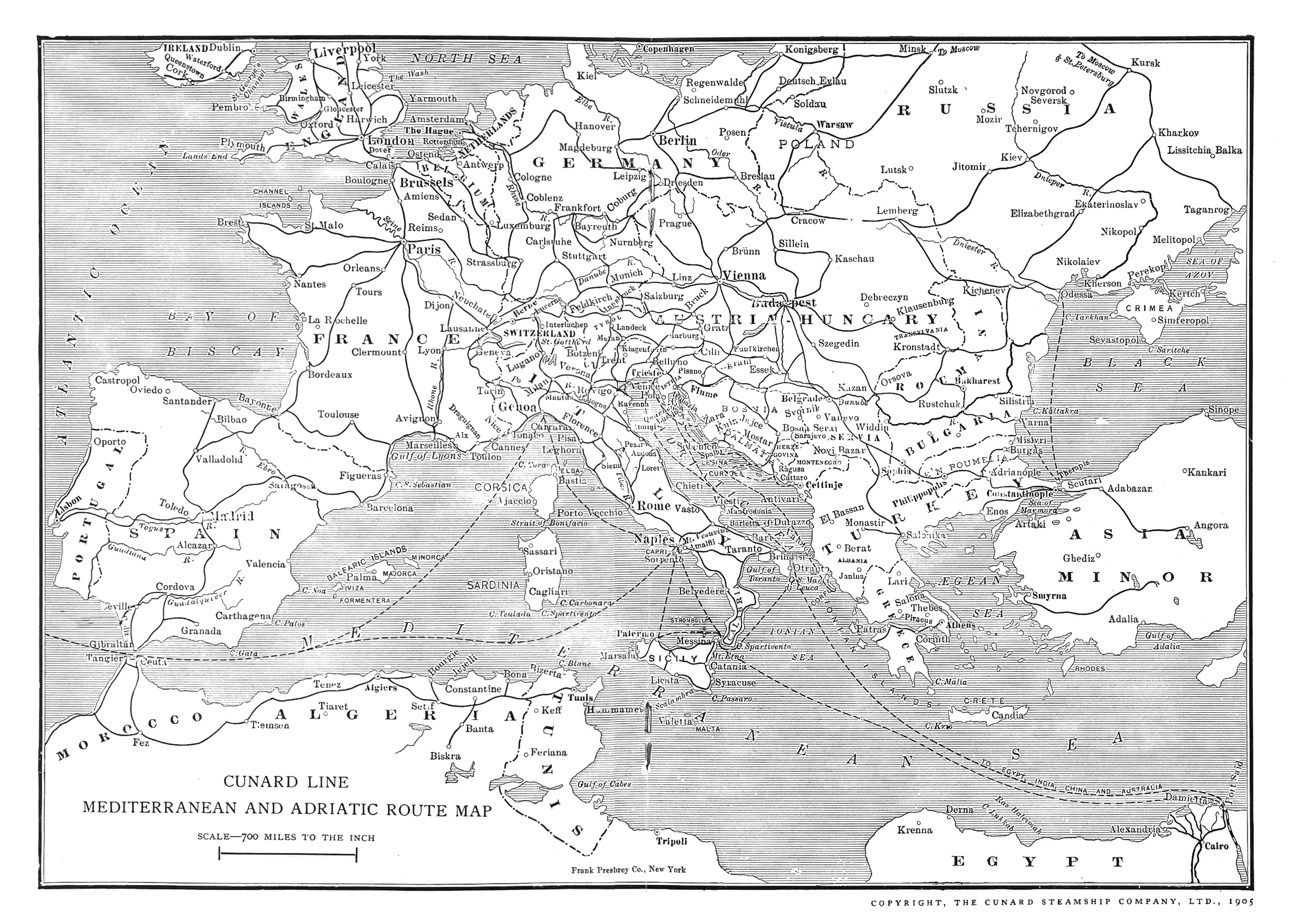
A Plan of Cunard Line's Adriatic and Mediterranean routes in 1905

From late 1911, Ivernia served on the route the Cunard Line had established from Fiume and Trieste to New York, carrying migrants from across the Mediterranean. During the winter months, she returned to the Liverpool to Boston service.

In total, 14 voyages were made from New York to Trieste, with a trial run in 1911 followed by five summer voyages each in 1912 and 1913. Three more voyages took place in 1914, including one extended voyage that also visited Alexandria in Egypt in March 1914.

=== World War I ===
==== Outbreak of war ====
On 28 July 1914, Ivernia was in Trieste, then in Austria-Hungary. While she was in port, her hosts declared war on Serbia, beginning World War I. She immediately left port, and did not stop in Fiume as she normally would have, instead continuing to Patras in Greece. The voyage towards New York City reached Gibraltar, a British port, on 5 August, by which point Britain had entered the war. Ivernia and 23 other steamers were held in Gibraltar while Cunard, the British Government, and other ship managers decided how to act.

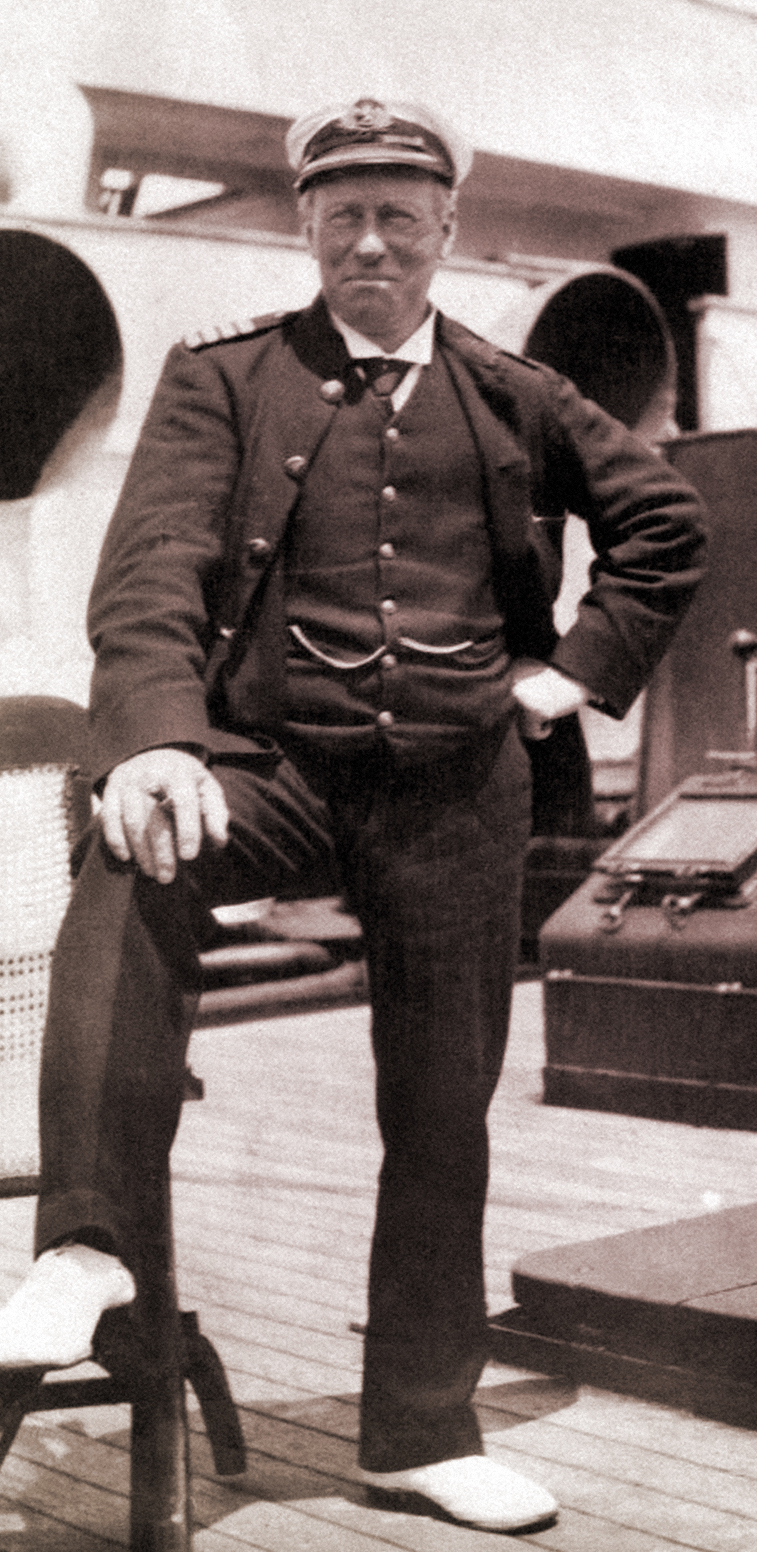
Captain H M Benison in 1907, then in command of Ivernia's half-sister RMS Carpathia

The situation in Gibraltar was tense, and Ivernia departed for the United States a few days later. The atmosphere on board prompted Captain H M Benison to post a notice to passengers on 14 August.

"For the benefit of the irresponsible parties who were very busy at Gibraltar in getting up petitions against the captain which were not signed, passing remarks about what the captain should do and what he should not do, and since leaving Gibraltar have laughed at the ship being in darkness at night, allow me to tell them, although I knew it when I left Gibraltar, that I received reliable information last night that there are at present five German cruisers in the Atlantic seeking British merchant steam-ships. Some people may be able to run a motor boat on a small river, but please allow an experienced captain to run a liner."

— Captain Horace Mills Benison, "Notice", Quote in 'Trip of the Ivernia', Cambrian News (5 August 1914)

The British authorities in Gibraltar had prevented Ivernia from taking on coal for fuel, instead reserving this for their naval vessels. This forced the Cunard liner to redirect from New York to Boston, a shorter voyage, to avoid running out of fuel. Ivernia then preceded around Cape Cod to New York City.

The tall funnel of Ivernia was painted a 'naval gray' while at sea crossing the Atlantic, as well as her railings, in an attempt to resemble a German merchant vessel.

This ship camouflage was put into use between Boston and New York when Captain Benison sighted a three-funneled cruiser off Long Island, New York. Ivernia's radio operators soon determined it was a false alarm and identified the cruiser as British.

==== Canadian troopship ====
On 4 August 1914, following her arrival in North America, the Ivernia was hired by the British government. Initially she brought Canadian Soldiers to Europe. On her way to Canada on 15 September 1914 she again ran aground, this time in the St Lawrence River off Pointe-au-Père, Quebec, the site of the disastrous sinking of the RMS Empress of Ireland only a few months earlier. Ivernia was in convoy with her sister Saxonia at the time, which rendered assistance alongside a government steamer. Ivernia was refloated the same day and was reported undamaged.

For this government contract Ivernia would pick up members of the Canadian First Contingent of soldiers trained at Valcartier alongside her running mates Saxonia, Franconia, and Laconia, and a number of other British and Canadian ocean liners.

The ships of this convoy first travelled to Montreal, Quebec, to be fitted out for carrying troops. They then proceeded to Quebec City to embark soldiers from Valcartier. Finally, the 31 merchant vessels gathered in Gaspé Bay, to form three columns for their journey across the Atlantic. They were escorted across the open ocean by HMS Glory and HMS Niobe, as well as the cruisers HMS Suffolk, HMS Essex, HMS Lancaster, and another of Ivernia's Boston running-mates, RMS Caronia, which had been converted into an armed merchant cruiser. The 12th Cruiser Squadron provided an additional escort during the crossing, with HMS Charybdis, HMS Talbot, HMS Eclipse, and HMS Diana. The reinforcement was completed with the addition of HMS Majestic. Finally, for the last stretch of the crossing, the battleship HMS Princess Royal.

==== Prison ship ====
In March 1915 she was in use as a prison ship moored off Southend-on-Sea and holding around 1,500 German prisoners of war.

==== British troopship ====
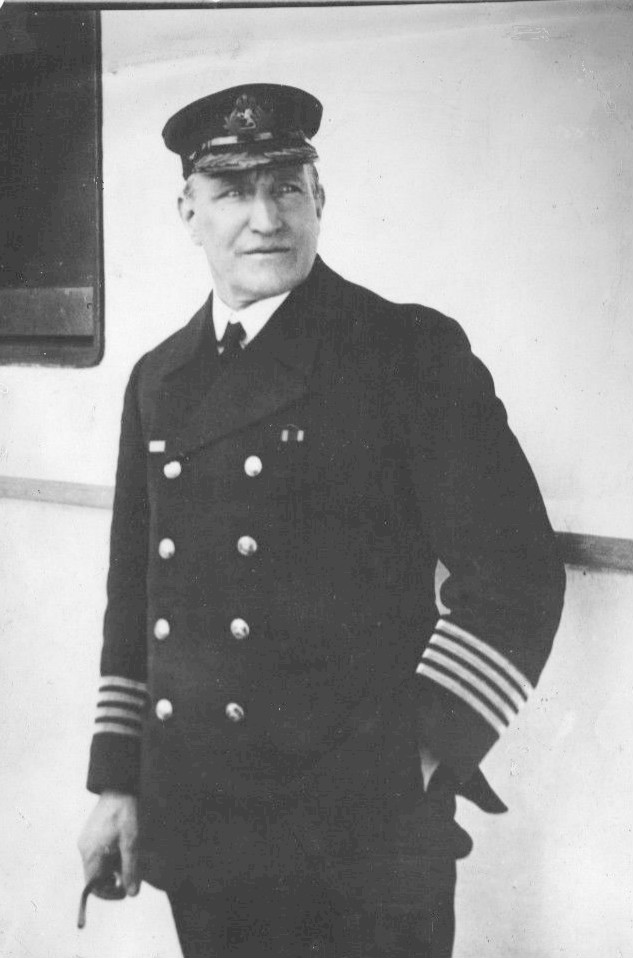
Captain W T Turner, Ivernia's final captain, photographed in 1915

Now known as HMT Ivernia, the liner began operating as a troopship in support of the Gallipoli campaign once she had offloaded her prisoners. The ship departed Devonport on 12 May 1915, carrying the Collingwood Battalion of the 63rd Royal Naval Division. She called at Gibraltar in 16 May, and Malta on 19 May, arriving at Lemnos on 22 May. Due to submarines in the Mediterranean Sea, Ivernia ran with no lights at night. The soldiers on this voyage would go on to fight in the Third Battle of Krithia.

In autumn of 1916, William Thomas Turner (made famous for being the captain of RMS Lusitania at the time of her sinking) had taken command of Ivernia from Arthur Rostron (made famous himself for being the captain of the RMS Carpathia during the rescue of the survivors of the Titanic).

==== Sinking ====
On 1 January 1917, the Ivernia was carrying some 2,400 British troops from Marseille to Alexandria, when at 10:12 am she was torpedoed by the German submarine UB-47 58 miles south-east of Cape Matapan in Greece, in the Kythira Strait. The ship went down fairly quickly with a loss of 36 crew members and 84 troops. Captain Turner, who had been criticised for not going down with the Lusitania (even though he had believed he was the last person on board when he left the ship after the water reached the bridge), remained on the bridge until all aboard had departed in lifeboats and rafts "before striking out to swim as the vessel went down under his feet."

HMS Rifleman rescued a number of survivors and armed trawlers towed the bulk, who had taken to lifeboats, to Suda Bay in Crete.

== Legacy ==
Ivernia made a fictional appearance near the end of the Arthur Conan Doyle novel The Lost World, published in 1912. In the story, the explorers sail on Ivernia for their return to England.

Cunard later resurrected the Ivernia name, launching a second RMS Ivernia in 1954. She followed a sister, a second RMS Saxonia, launched earlier in 1954, echoing the two sisters from 1899. The 1954 Ivernia was renamed Franconia in 1963, prior to the third Ivernia, built for Cunard's North Atlantic cargo service in 1964.

Ivernia Road in Walton in Liverpool still bears the name of the vessel. Neighbouring streets include Saxonia Road, Lusitania Road, and Mauretania Road, after the Cunard fleetmates of Ivernia.

The wreck of Ivernia lies off the coast of the Greek island of Antikythera.

== See also ==
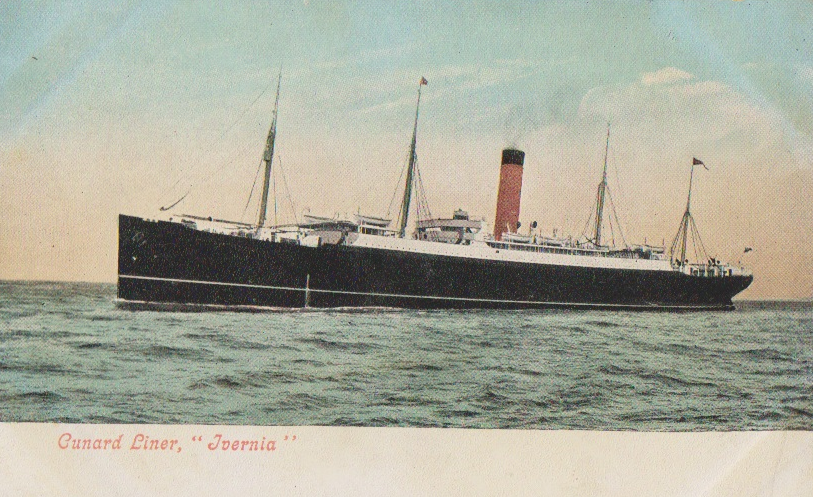
A postcard for Ivernia that uses a photograph of half-sister Carpathia

- List of Cunard Line ships
