= Ultonia =

Ultonia may refer to:

- Ulster (latinized as Ultonia), a province in Ireland
- SS Ultonia, a passenger steamship
- Ultonia Regiment of the Spanish army
