= USS Freehold =

Minesweeper of the United States Navy

History

United States
- Name: USS Freehold
- Namesake: Previous name retained
- Completed: 1903
- Acquired: 17 September 1917
- Commissioned: 22 September 1917
- Fate: Sunk in collision 17 April 1919; Refloated, overhauled, and returned to owner 27 May 1919
- Notes: Operated as commercial tug Freehold 1903–1917 and from 1919

General characteristics
- Type: Minesweeper and tug
- Length: 110 ft 1 in (33.55 m)
- Beam: 24 ft 5 in (7.44 m)
- Draft: 11 ft (3.4 m)
- Speed: 12 knots
- Complement: 24
- Armament: 1 × 1-pounder gun

USS Freehold (SP-347) was a minesweeper and tug that served in the United States Navy from 1917 to 1919.

Freehold was built as a commercial tug of the same name in 1903 by Neafie and Levy at Philadelphia. On 17 September 1917, the U.S. Navy chartered her for use as a minesweeper and tug during World War I. She was commissioned on 22 September 1917 as USS Freehold (SP-347).

Assigned to the 3rd Naval District, Freehold performed minesweeping duties in the New York City area for the remainder of World War I, sweeping and buoying channels daily for convoys entering and leaving New York Harbor. She also performed general tug duties through the end of the war and into 1919.

On 17 April 1919, Freehold was assisting in the docking of the British Cunard Line passenger ship RMS Saxonia when one of Saxonia's propellers struck her. Freehold sank, with the loss of one of her crew members.

Freehold was refloated, overhauled, and returned to her owner on 27 May 1919.
