= RMS Ultonia =

1898 British steamship for the Cunard Line

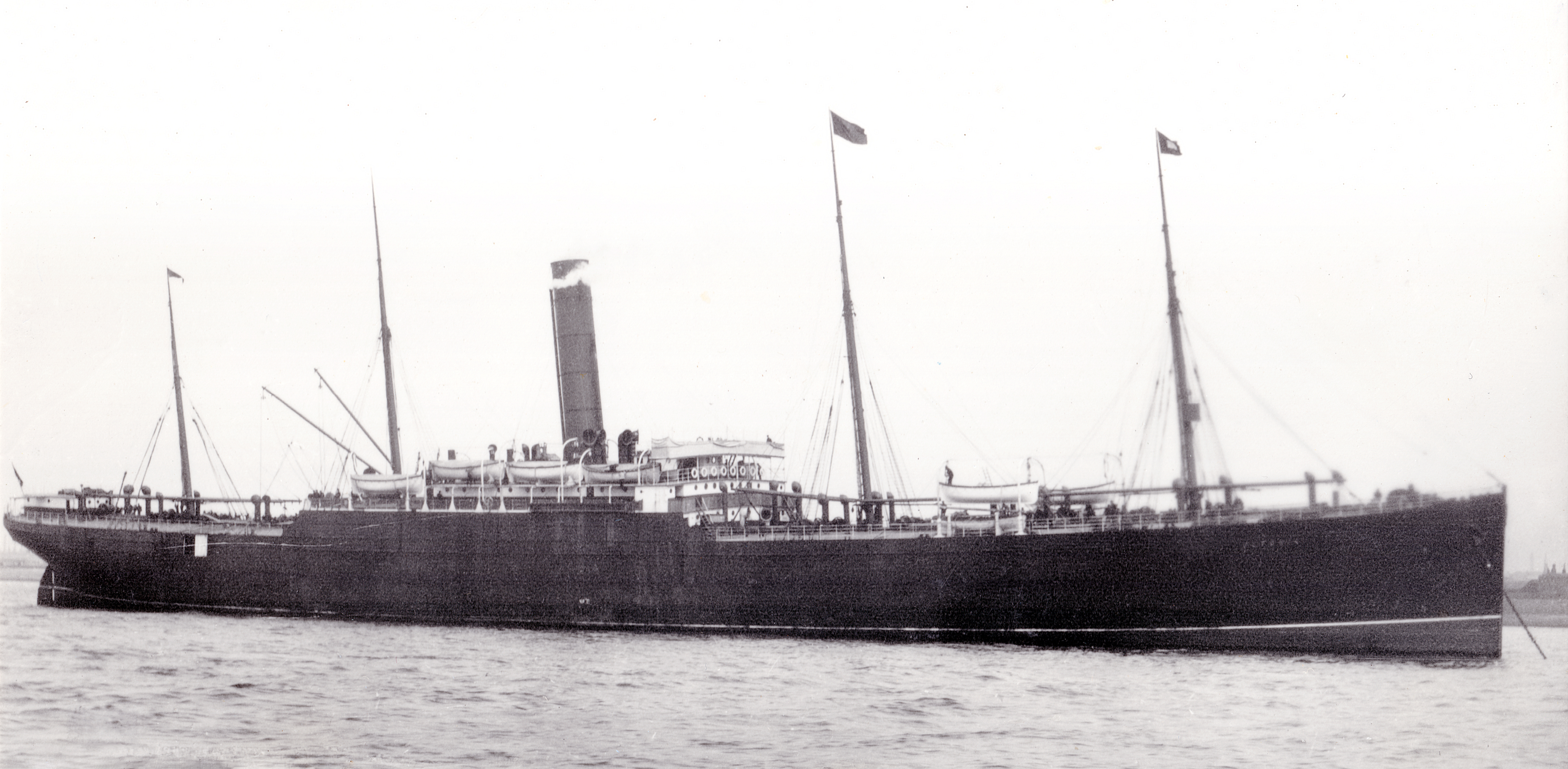
- Ultonia at anchor in 1899

History

United Kingdom
- Name: RMS Ultonia
- Namesake: Latin name for Ulster
- Owner: Cunard Line
- Operator: Cunard Line
- Port of registry: Liverpool, United Kingdom
- Builder: C S Swan & Hunter, Wallsend, England
- Yard number: 228
- Launched: 4 June 1898
- Maiden voyage: 26 October 1898
- Identification: UK Official Number 109478; Code letters "QJVR"; Marconi Radio Call Letters "MTA"
- Fate: Sunk on 27 June 1917

General characteristics
- Tonnage: At launch; 8,845 GRT; After 1904 refit; 10,402 GRT
- Length: 513 ft (156 m) total; 500 ft (152 m) between perpendiculars
- Beam: 57.4 ft (17 m)
- Height: 44.96 ft (14 m)
- Draught: 20.6 ft (6 m)
- Depth: 33.9 ft (10 m)
- Capacity: At launch; 800 cattle; 1899 passenger refit; 675 third class; 1904 refit; 120 second class; 2,100 third class

RMS Ultonia was a British passenger-cargo vessel built by C. S. Swan & Hunter of Wallsend, England, and bought by the Cunard Line prior to launch in 1898. Ultonia saw military service during World War I and was sunk by a German torpedo in 1917.

== Background ==
In the late 1890s Cunard had only a small number of vessels running on the transatlantic trade, with Catalonia, Cephalonia and Pavonia operating the passenger service on the Boston route. These were introduced in the early 1880s and were around 5,000 GRT each.

In 1893 Cunard had also introduced RMS Lucania and RMS Campania as fast express liners between Liverpool and New York, with these winning the Blue Riband speed record, but this was later won by Kaiser Wilhelm der Grosse of the Norddeutscher Lloyd line in 1897.

White Star Line had also recently introduced the liners Georgic and Cymric. These were known as 'intermediate' liners, and were economical and did not consume much fuel for their speed, but they were not as luxurious or as speedy as the German record-holders or British express liners. Instead they focused on increased cargo space where the express liners would have had additional engine machinery and boilers.

Cunard decided to follow White Star Line in producing smaller, more profitable liners of more moderate speed, oriented at the Liverpool–Boston service, to replace Catalonia, Cephalonia, and Pavonia. Ultonia was the first of these, built as a cargo liner but adapted to carry passengers, and was soon followed by the Ivernia-class: Ivernia, Saxonia and the later, smaller Carpathia.

== Design and construction ==
=== Deck plan ===
From top to bottom:

- Navigating Bridge, an open flying bridge.
- Promenade Deck or Boat Deck, containing the captain's quarters, chart room, and wheel house.
- Bridge Deck, housing engineers, officers, and petty officers.
- Shelter Deck, a central full-width deckhouse under the bridge deck originally set out for the carriage of cattle, later converted for passengers. A small deckhouse at the stern of the ship housed the steering gear room.
- Upper Deck, spanning the full length of the ship, originally cattlemen were housed at the rear, and crew at the very front, but later converted for passengers.
- 'TweenDeck, a cargo deck.
- Lower 'Tween Deck / Orlop Deck, only over No 1 and No 2 holds, this was insulated and refrigerated.
- Two boiler rooms sat in the middle of the ship, one with four singled-ended boilers, the other with one and adjoining coal bunkers. The engine room sat behind the rear boiler room on the Tank Top, the top of the double bottom. Six cargo holds, with number one forward, and ballast tanks fill out the remaining space.

The lower portion of the ship had eight watertight bulkheads extending up to the Upper Deck, and dividing Ultonia into nine watertight compartments.

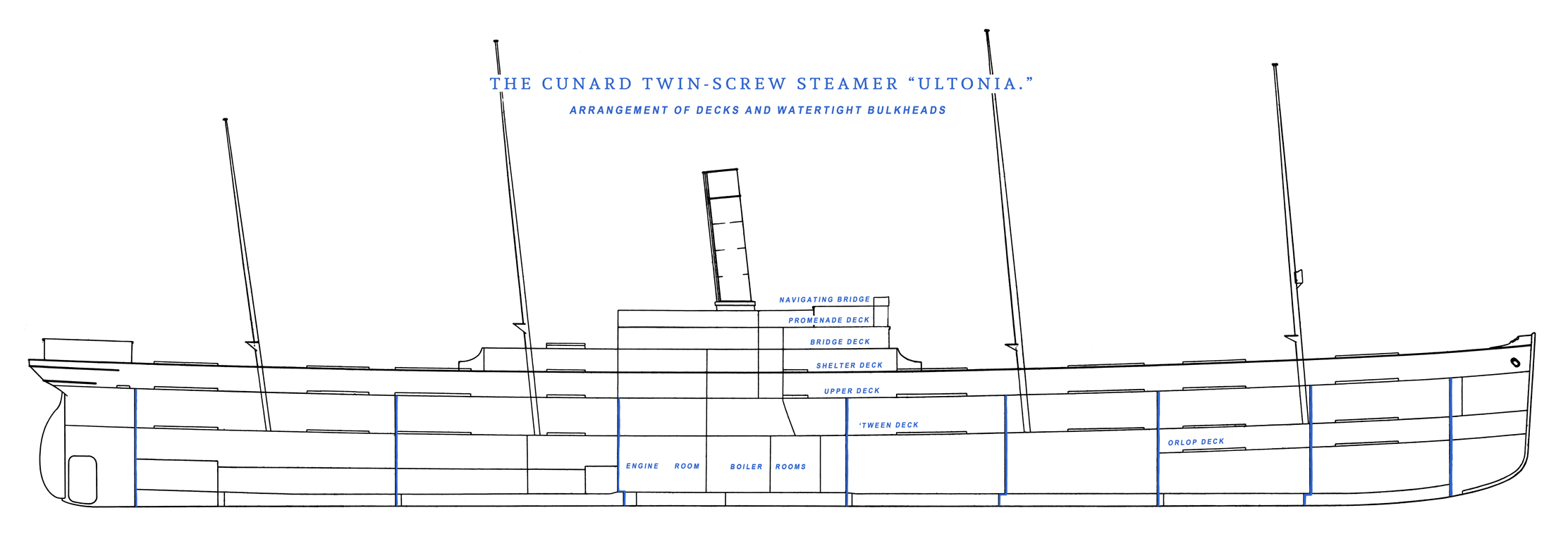
A longitudinal section plan of the Ultonia at launch in 1898, showing deck and bulkhead layout

=== Rigging ===
Four staysails and two jibs were included in the rigging plan for Ultonia, described as a "four masted fore and aft schooner".

== History ==
Ultonia was launched on 4 June 1898, measuring 500 feet (150 m) by 57.4 feet (17.5 m) by 33.9 feet (10.3 m), and assessed at 8,845 gross register tons (GRT) with engines by Sir C. Furness, Westgarth & Co, Middlesbrough. Originally designed for cargo and cattle, third-class accommodation for 675 passengers was fitted in 1899. Ultonia left Liverpool carrying passengers for the first time on 28 February 1899, with 102 passengers at departure and an additional 27 picked up at Queenstown, Ireland, before proceeding to Boston.

Departing Boston on one of these voyages on 5 August 1899, Ultonia hit a ledge just outside the main channel of Boston Harbor at Nantasket Roads, which was the typical route at the time. This area is now called the Ultonia Ledge, located one and a half miles (2.4 km) southeast of Boston Light, and is as shallow as 21 feet (6.4 m) at mean lower low water according to modern nautical charts. This event spurred the alteration of ships' courses in the area to avoid the ledge, the dredging of Nantasket Roads to a depth of 35 feet (11 m) to be safe for large steamships, and also the later dredging of the wider northern approach via President Roads, which is now the main channel for large ships entering or exiting Boston Harbor.

In 1904, the ship was refitted to accommodate 120 second-class passengers, and 2,100 third-class passengers, increasing the tonnage to 10,402 gross register tons. In 1915, further refits were made to carry up to 2,000 horses for the war effort.

On 27 March 1917, Ultonia collided with the British collier Don Benito in the Atlantic Ocean (49°35′N 6°44′W). Don Benito sank.

== Sinking ==
During World War I, Ultonia was torpedoed and sunk in the Atlantic Ocean 190 miles (310 km) from Fastnet, Ireland, on 27 June 1917 by the Imperial German Navy submarine U-53 under Captain Hans Rose. One life was lost in the attack.

== See also ==
- List of the largest ships hit by U-boats in World War I
- List of shipwrecks in June 1917
- William Thomas Turner
