= Kaiser Wilhelm der Grosse =

Kaiser Wilhelm der Grosse may refer to:

- SS Kaiser Wilhelm der Grosse, an ocean liner
- SMS Kaiser Wilhelm der Grosse, a battleship
