= RMS Saxonia (1899) =

British passenger ship of the Cunard Line

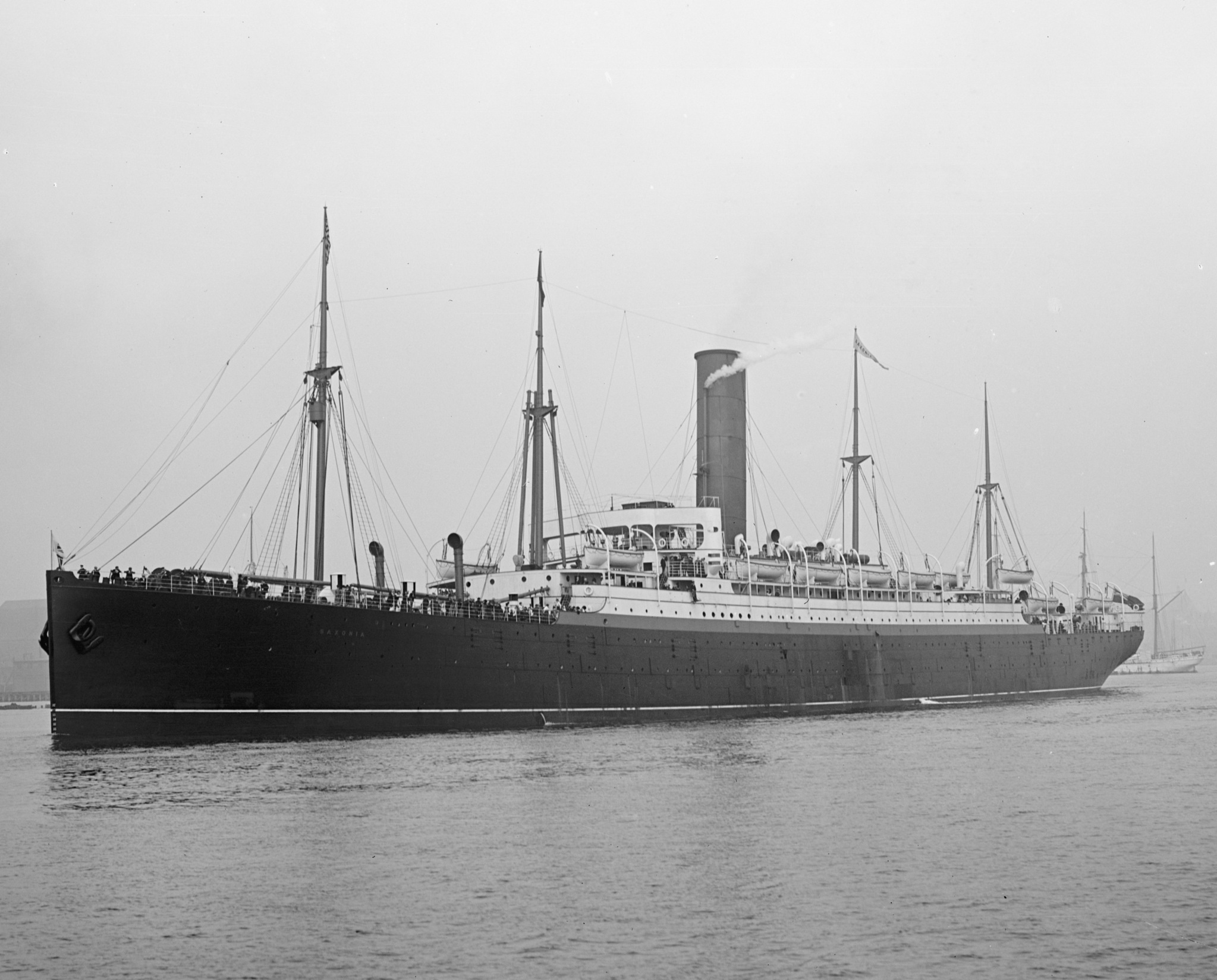
- RMS Saxonia around 1900

History

United Kingdom
- Name: RMS Saxonia
- Namesake: Latin name for Saxony
- Owner: Cunard Line
- Operator: Cunard Line
- Port of registry: Liverpool, United Kingdom
- Route: Liverpool–Boston (1900–1911); Liverpool–Boston, Liverpool–New York City, and Liverpool–Trieste/Fiume (1911–1914); Government war service (1914–1918); London–New York and London-Hamburg–New York (1919–1925)
- Builder: John Brown & Company, Clydebank, Scotland
- Launched: 16 December 1899
- Completed: mid-May 1900
- Maiden voyage: 22 May 1900
- Out of service: 1925
- Fate: Scrapped in the Netherlands in 1925

General characteristics
- Tonnage: 14,281 GRT (as built); 14,197 GRT (after 1920 refit)
- Length: 600 ft (180 m)
- Beam: 64.2 ft (19.6 m)
- Propulsion: Steam quadruple expansion engines, twin propellers
- Speed: 15 knots (28 km/h; 17 mph)
- Capacity: 1,964 passengers (as built, 164 First Class, 200 Second Class, 1,600 Third Class); 1,449 passengers (after 1920 refit)
- Notes: Sister ship to RMS Ivernia (1899); Half-sister to RMS Carpathia

The first RMS Saxonia was a passenger ship of the British Cunard Line. Between 1900 and 1925, Saxonia operated on North Atlantic and Mediterranean passenger routes, and she saw military service during World War I (1914–1918).

Saxonia was the second and largest ship launched of the Ivernia class of intermediate liners for Cunard. RMS Ivernia was launched a few months before Saxonia, and RMS Carpathia was launched in 1902.

== Design ==
Around 1900, the Cunard Line faced tight competition from the British White Star Line and the German lines Norddeutscher Lloyd and Hamburg America (HAPAG). Cunard's largest liners, as of 1898 RMS Campania and RMS Lucania, had a reputation for size and speed, both being of 12,950 gross register tons (grt) and having held the Blue Riband for the fastest crossing of the Atlantic Ocean. However, Norddeutscher Lloyd's new liner SS Kaiser Wilhelm der Grosse had taken the Blue Riband from them in 1897, while White Star was planning to place a new 17,000-grt liner, RMS Oceanic into service. In response, Cunard updated its fleet, ordering new liners including the sister ships RMS Ivernia and RMS Saxonia (both launched in late 1899) and the similar RMS Carpathia (launched in mid-1902).

Rather than attempting to fully regain prestige by spending the additional money necessary to order liners that were fast enough to win back the Blue Riband from Kaiser Wilhelm der Grosse or large enough to rival Oceanic in size, Cunard tried to maximize their profitability in order to remain solvent enough to fend off any takeover attempts. The three new ships were not especially fast, but all were larger than Campania and Lucania; in fact, Saxonia at 14,281 GRT was the largest Cunard liner up to that time – beating out Ivernia, which entered service a month before Saxonia, for that distinction – and the largest until Cunard placed RMS Caronia in service in 1905. Thus, although the decision to order and launch Saxonia in 1898–1899 was taken well before J. P. Morgan’s efforts of 1900–1902, to put together the large combination of shipping lines that was officially designated IMM in October 1902, Saxonia, her sister Ivernia, and her "half-sister" Carpathia became both instruments and models through which Cunard was able to successfully compete with its larger rivals – most notably IMM’s lead company, White Star.

Saxonia was steam-powered, with her two propellers powered by quadruple expansion engines, and had a service speed of 15 knots (28 km/h). She had a long, black hull, a low, well-balanced superstructure, and four masts. Saxonia had a large cargo capacity, so much so that her passenger accommodations were smaller than most people expected for a liner of her size. Her four masts were intended to allow effective handling of larger amounts of cargo than was customary on a liner.

Constructed at the John Brown & Company shipyard at Clydebank, Scotland, Saxonia was launched on 16 December 1899. She completed fitting out in mid-May 1900.

== Operational history ==
=== Early history ===
Saxonia departed Liverpool on her maiden voyage on 22 May 1900, bound for Boston, Massachusetts. She operated on the Liverpool–Boston route until 1909, when she shifted on an alternating basis between Boston and New York, and between Liverpool and the Adriatic ports of Fiume and Trieste.

=== World War I ===
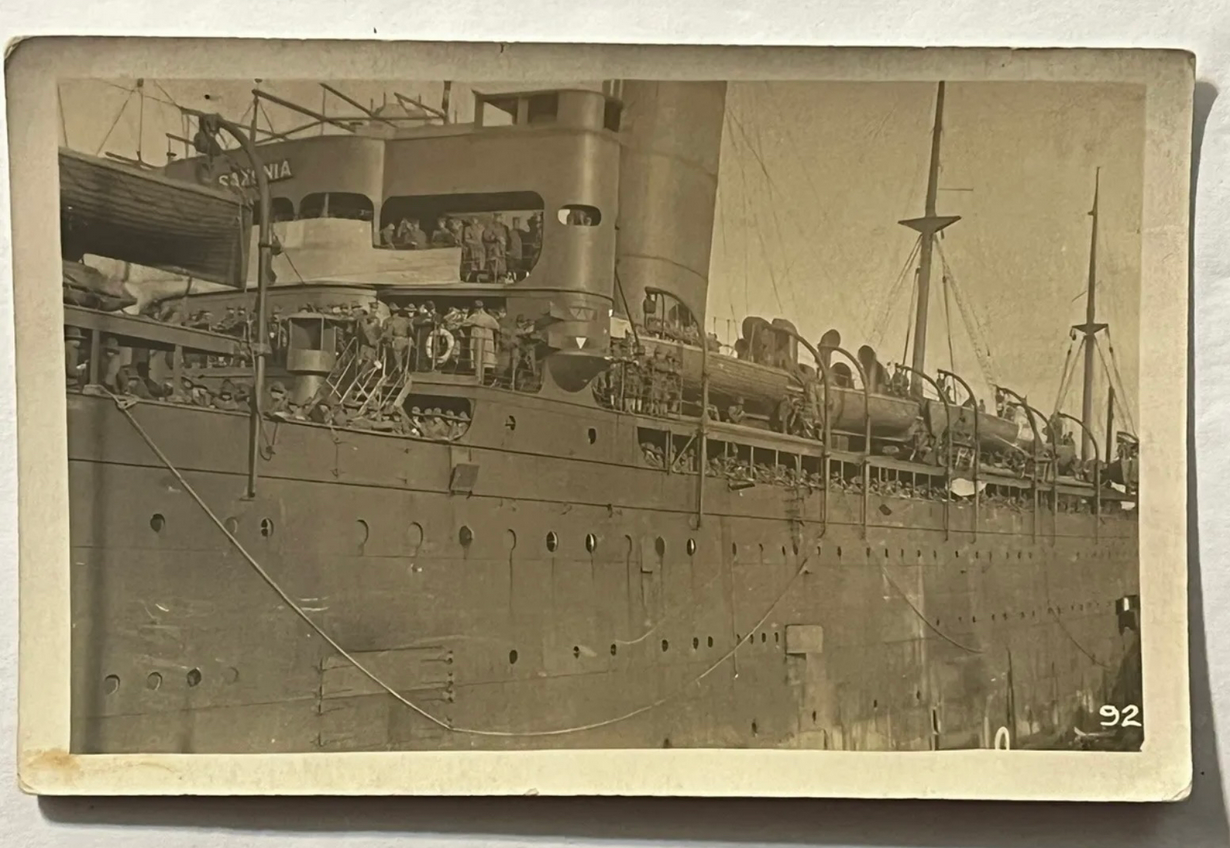
Saxonia, carrying troops in 1915.

When the United Kingdom entered World War I in August 1914, Saxonia was requisitioned for government service and taken off her Trieste-Boston route. She made a single voyage as a troopship, carrying troops from the 41st Battalion of the Canadian Expeditionary Force, arriving in England on 28 October 1914. In 1915 she was tied up in England on the River Thames as an accommodation ship for German prisoners of war. In March 1915, she resumed service as a troopship.

=== Later career ===
After the war ended in November 1918, Saxonia returned to commercial service, returning to the North Atlantic run on the route between Liverpool and New York City. On 17 April 1919, one of her propellers struck the United States Navy tug USS Freehold (SP-347) while Freehold was assisting in docking her at New York. Freehold sank with the loss of one crew member killed, but soon was refloated and repaired.

Saxonia underwent a major refit at Tilbury in 1920. Her funnel was shortened to 90 feet (27.4 m) in height, her passenger accommodations were modified to allow her to carry 1,449 passengers – 471 in cabin class and 978 in third class – and her gross tonnage dropped to 14,197.

After her refit, Saxonia returned to the North Atlantic service, operating between London and New York City. An additional stop at Hamburg, Germany, was added later.

=== Disposal ===
In 1925, the aging and outdated Saxonia was sold to the Hendrik Ido Ambacht company in the Netherlands for scrapping. Her scrapping was completed before the end of the year.

== Legacy ==
Cunard later resurrected the Saxonia name, launching a second RMS Saxonia in 1954. She was followed by a sister, a second RMS Ivernia, launched later in 1954, echoing the two sisters from 1899.

Saxonia Road in Walton in Liverpool still bears the name of the vessel. Neighbouring streets include Ivernia Road, Lusitania Road, and Mauretania Road, after the Cunard fleetmates of Saxonia.

== See also ==
- Ocean liner
- Maritime history of the United Kingdom
- Transatlantic Crossing
