= RMS Caronia (1904) =

Cunard line transatlantic steam ocean liner

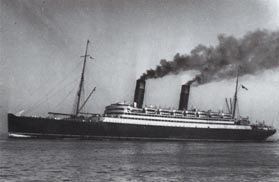
- Caronia under way

History

United Kingdom
- Name: 1904: Caronia; 1932: Taiseiyo Maru
- Namesake: 1904: Caro Brown; 1932: Japanese for "Atlantic Ship"
- Owner: Cunard Line
- Operator: 1914–15: (United Kingdom) Royal Navy
- Port of registry: 1904: Liverpool; 1932: Osaka
- Builder: John Brown & Co, Clydebank
- Yard number: 362
- Launched: 13 July 1904
- Completed: February 1905
- Maiden voyage: 25 February 1905
- Identification: UK official number: 120826; Code letters HBTQ; by 1913: call sign MRA; 1914–15: pennant number: M 53
- Nickname(s): "pretty sister of Carmania"
- Fate: Scrapped 1933 in Osaka

General characteristics
- Type: Ocean liner
- Tonnage: 1904: 19,594 GRT, 10,213 NRT; 1909: 19,687 GRT, 10,306 NRT; after 1924 refit: 19,782 GRT, 9,752 NRT
- Length: 650.0 ft (198.1 m) registered length; 678 ft (207 m) o/a
- Beam: 72.2 ft (22.0 m)
- Draught: 33 ft 3 in (10.13 m)
- Depth: 40.2 ft (12.3 m)
- Installed power: 3,363 NHP; 22,000 IHP
- Propulsion: 2 × quadruple-expansion engines; 2 × screws
- Speed: 18 knots (33 km/h)
- Capacity: 1,550 passengers: 300 first class; 350 second class; 900 third class; cargo: 46,280 cubic feet (1,311 m^{3}) refrigerated
- Sensors & processing systems: by 1930: submarine signalling; wireless direction finding
- Armament: (as AMC): 8 × QF 4.7 inch Mk V naval guns
- Notes: sister ship: RMS Carmania

RMS Caronia was a Cunard Line transatlantic steam ocean liner. She was launched in 1904 and scrapped in 1932. In World War I she was first an armed merchant cruiser (AMC) and then a troop ship.

RMS Carmania was launched in 1905 as her sister ship, although the two had different machinery. When new, the pair were the largest ships in the Cunard fleet.

== Building ==
John Brown & Company of Clydebank launched Caronia on 13 July 1904 and completed her in February 1905. She was the only ship in the Cunard fleet to be named after an American, being named after Caro Brown, granddaughter of Cunard's New York agent.

Caronia was propelled by quadruple-expansion engines. Carmania had steam turbines, and proved to be the more economical of the two.

Her holds included 46,280 cubic feet (1,311 m^{3}) refrigerated cargo space.

== Service ==
Caronia left Liverpool on her maiden voyage to New York on 25 February 1905. A successful 1906 cruise from New York to the Mediterranean led to Caronia frequently being used for cruising.

On 14 April 1912 Caronia transmitted the first ice warning at 09:00 to RMS Titanic reporting "bergs, growlers and field ice".

In 1914 Cunard briefly placed Caronia on its Boston service. At the start of the First World War the Admiralty requisitioned her to be an armed merchant cruiser. She was stationed off New York on contraband patrol. She was a troop ship from 1916 until after the Armistice of 11 November 1918. Her last duties were to repatriate Canadian troops in 1919. She returned to the Liverpool – New York run after the war.

In 1920 Caronia was converted to burn oil instead of coal.

After returning to service, she sailed on a number of different routes, including:

- Liverpool – New York / Boston
- London – New York
- Liverpool - Mediterranean cruise stopping at Gibraltar, Algiers, Monaco, Genoa and Naples (Dec 1921 - approx Mar 1922)
- Hamburg – New York (1922)
- Liverpool – Quebec (1924)
- New York – Havana

== Fate ==
In 1931 Cunard laid up Caronia, and then sold her for £20,000 to Hughes Bolckow & Co for scrap. In 1932 Hughes Bolckow sold her to Kobe Kaiun KK for £39,000, who renamed her Taiseiyo Maru, (the Atlantic Ship). Kobe Kaiun had her towed to Osaka, where demolition work started on 28 March 1933.

== Bibliography ==
- Bonsor, NRP. North Atlantic Seaway.
- Haws, Duncan (1979). Merchant ships in Profile 2. Merchant Fleets. Cambridge: Patrick Stephens Ltd. ISBN 0-85059-324-7.
- Osborne, Richard; Spong, Harry & Grover, Tom (2007). Armed Merchant Cruisers 1878–1945. Windsor: World Warship Society. ISBN 978-0-9543310-8-5.
- Wills, Elspeth (2010). The Fleet 1840–2010. London: Cunard. ISBN 978-0-9542451-8-4.
- Wilson, RM (1956). The Big Ships. London: Cassell & Co.
