= Lavia =

Lavia may refer to:

- Lavia (genus), a species of bat
- Lavia, Finland, a former municipality in Finland
- SS Lavia, a cruise ship which caught fire and sank in 1989
- Lavia (surname)
