= SS Valacia =

Valacia was the name of two ships operated by Cunard White Star Line

- SS Valacia (1910), built as Luceric for the Bank Line. Purchased in 1916. Named in World War I merchant ship convoy HN53 23-24 March 1918. Sold in 1931 and renamed Ernani. Sunk in 1941 after being torpedoed by U-103.
- SS Valacia (1943), built as Empire Camp for the Ministry of War Transport. Managed from 1945 and purchased in 1946. Sold in 1951 to Bristol City Line.
