= Cunard-White Star Line =

Former British shipping line

Cunard-White Star Limited
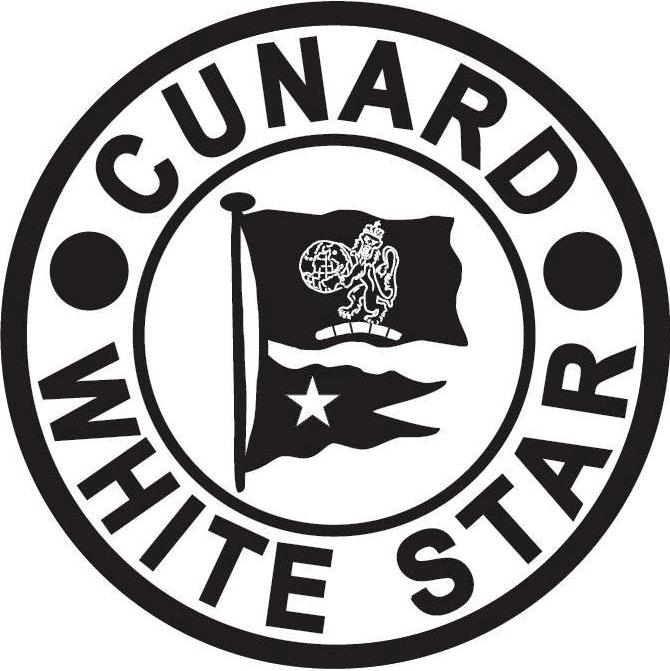
- Industry: Transportation
- Predecessor: White Star Line; Cunard Line
- Founded: 10 May 1934; 92 years ago
- Defunct: 1 January 1950; 76 years ago
- Successor: Cunard Line
- Headquarters: Liverpool, United Kingdom
- Area served: Transatlantic
- Key people: Percy Bates (Chairman)
- Owner: Cunard Line (62%) and White Star Line (38%)
- Footnotes House Flag

Cunard-White Star Ltd, was a British shipping line which existed between 1934 and 1949.

== History ==
The company was created to control the joint shipping assets of the Cunard Line and the White Star Line after both companies experienced financial difficulties during the Great Depression. Cunard White Star controlled a total of twenty-five ocean liners (with Cunard contributing fifteen ships and White Star ten). Both Cunard and White Star were in dire financial trouble, and were looking to complete enormous liners: White Star had Hull 844 –Oceanic – and Cunard had Hull 534, which would later become RMS Queen Mary. In 1933, the British government agreed to provide assistance to the two competitors on the condition that they merge their North Atlantic operations. The agreement was completed on 30 December 1933, and the merger officially took place on 10 May 1934, resulting in the formation of Cunard-White Star Limited. Under the terms of the merger, Cunard contributed fifteen ships and White Star ten, giving the new company a fleet of twenty-five ocean liners. Ownership of the new company reflected the respective financial positions of the two lines: Cunard shareholders held a 62% stake, while 38% was allocated to White Star’s creditors. In keeping with the heritage of both lines, White Star ships flew the White Star flag above the Cunard flag, while Cunard ships flew the Cunard flag above the White Star flag.

Being in a better financial and operating state than White Star, Cunard began absorbing White Star assets and as a result, most of the White Star vessels were quickly disposed of or sent to the shipbreakers. White Star's Australia and New Zealand service ships were transferred to the Shaw, Savill & Albion Line in 1934 and RMS Olympic was retired and sold for scrap the following year, along with Cunard's RMS Mauretania. White Star's flagship RMS Majestic, the largest ship in the world until the completion of SS Normandie in 1935, was sold in 1936.

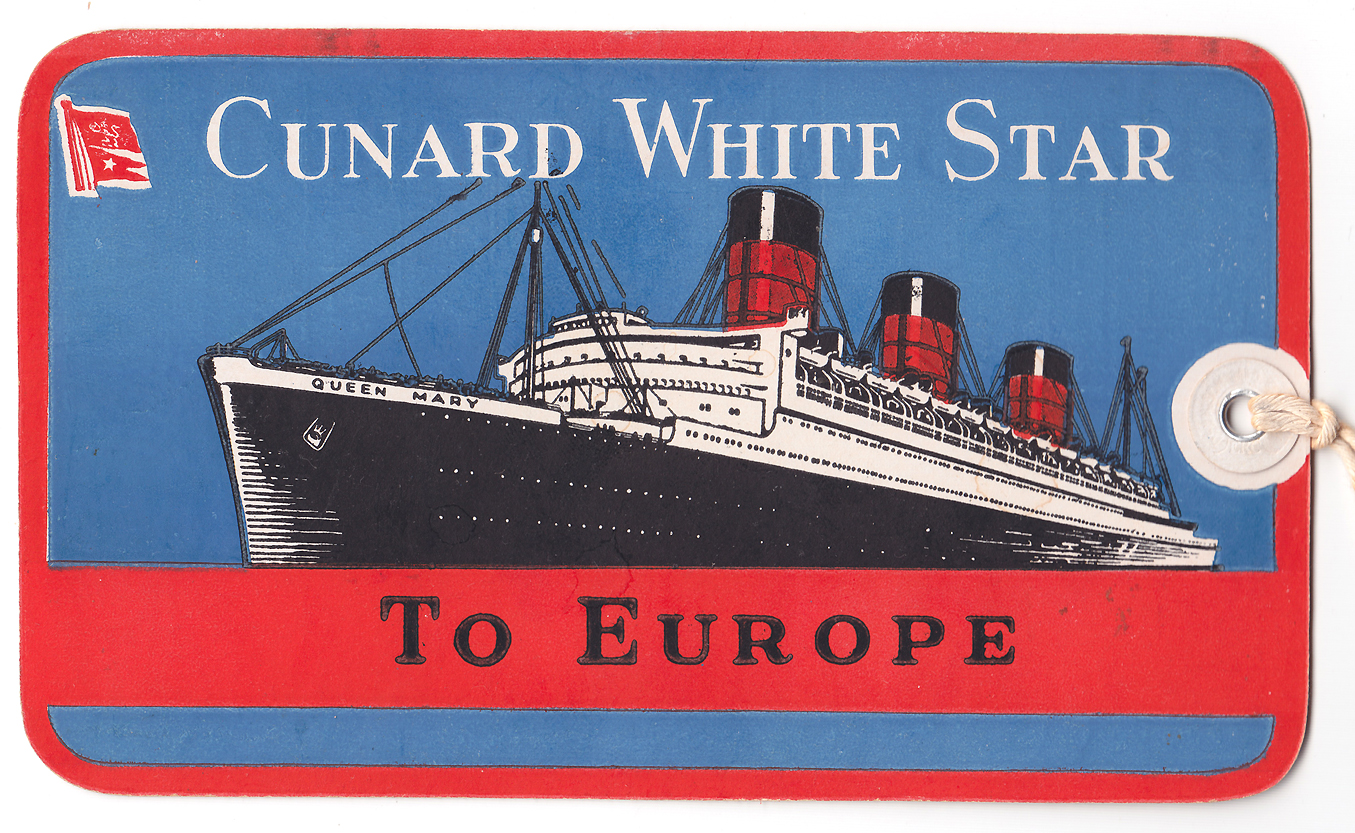
Cunard White Star "Queen Mary" baggage tag

In 1947, Cunard acquired White Star’s 38% share in the company and on 31 December 1949 the company had dropped the White Star name and was renamed Cunard Line. Both the Cunard and White Star house flags were flown on the company's liners at the time of the merger and thereafter. However, the Cunard flag was flown over the White Star flag on the last two White Star liners, MV Georgic and MV Britannic. Georgic was scrapped in 1956, while Britannic made the final Liverpool–New York crossing of any White Star vessel from New York on 25 November 1960, and returned to Liverpool for the final time before sailing under her own power to the ship breakers. She was the last White Star liner in existence, leaving the passenger tender SS Nomadic, which was also owned by the company until 1934, as the last White Star Line ship afloat.

Despite this, all Cunard Line ships flew both the Cunard and White Star Line house flags on their masts until late 1968. This was most likely because Nomadic remained in service with Cunard until 4 November 1968, and was sent to the breakers' yard, only to be bought for use as a floating restaurant. After this, the White Star flag was no longer flown, the White Star name was removed from Cunard operations and all remnants of both White Star Line and Cunard-White Star were retired. Cunard operated as a separate entity until 1972, when it was acquired by Trafalgar House, a British industrial and shipping conglomerate. After Trafalgar house was acquired by Kværner Cunard was put up for sale and by 1999 had been purchased by Carnival Corporation.

== Fleet ==
| Ship | Built | In service for Cunard-White Star Line | Tonnage | Image |
|---|---|---|---|---|
| Skirmisher | 1884 | 1934–1945 | 612 GRT | |
| Mauretania (1) | 1907 | 1934–35 | 31,938 GRT | |
| Adriatic | 1907 | 1934-35 | 24,541 GRT | |
| Olympic | 1911 | 1934–35 | 46,439 GRT | |
| Nomadic | 1911 | 1934 | 1,273 GRT | |
| Traffic | 1911 | 1934-41 | 640 GRT | |
| Ceramic | 1913 | 1934-42 | 18,495 GRT | |
| Berengaria | 1913 | 1934–38 | 52,226 GRT | |
| Homeric | 1913 | 1934–35 | 34,351 GRT | |
| Aquitania | 1914 | 1934–49 | 45,650 GRT | |
| Majestic | 1914 | 1934–36 | 56,551 GRT | |
| Scythia | 1921 | 1934–49 | 19,700 GRT | |
| Samaria | 1922 | 1934–49 | 19,700 GRT | |
| Laconia | 1922 | 1934–42 | 19,700 GRT | |
| Antonia | 1922 | 1934–42 | 13,900 GRT | |
| Ausonia | 1922 | 1934–42 | 13,900 GRT | |
| Lancastria | 1922 | 1934–40 | 16,250 GRT | |
| Franconia | 1922 | 1934–49 | 20,200 GRT | |
| Doric | 1923 | 1934–35 | 16,484 GRT | |
| Aurania | 1924 | 1934–42 | 14,000 GRT | |
| Carinthia | 1925 | 1934–40 | 20,200 GRT | |
| Ascania | 1925 | 1934–49 | 14,000 GRT | |
| Alaunia | 1925 | 1934–42 | 14,000 GRT | |
| Calgaric | 1927 | Never entered service (owned 1934) | 16,063 GRT | |
| Laurentic | 1927 | 1934–36 | 18,724 GRT | |
| Britannic | 1929 | 1934–49 | 26,943 GRT | |
| Georgic | 1932 | 1934–49 | 27,759 GRT | |
| Queen Mary | 1936 | 1936–49 | 80,750 GRT | |
| Mauretania (2) | 1938 | 1938–49 | 35,738 GRT | |
| Queen Elizabeth | 1940 | 1940–49 | 83,650 GRT | |
| Valacia | 1943 | 1946–1950 | 7,052 | |
| Vasconia | 1944 | 1946–1950 | 7,058 | |
| Media | 1947 | 1947–49 | 13,350 GRT | |
| Asia | 1947 | 1947–1963 | 8,723 | |
| Brescia | 1945 | 1947–1966 | 3,834 | |
| Parthia | 1947 | 1947–49 | 13,350 GRT | |
| Vardulia | 1944 | 1947-1968 | 7,176 | |
| Caronia | 1949 | 1949 | 34,200 GRT | |
