= Oceanic (unfinished ship) =

Unfinished motor vessel

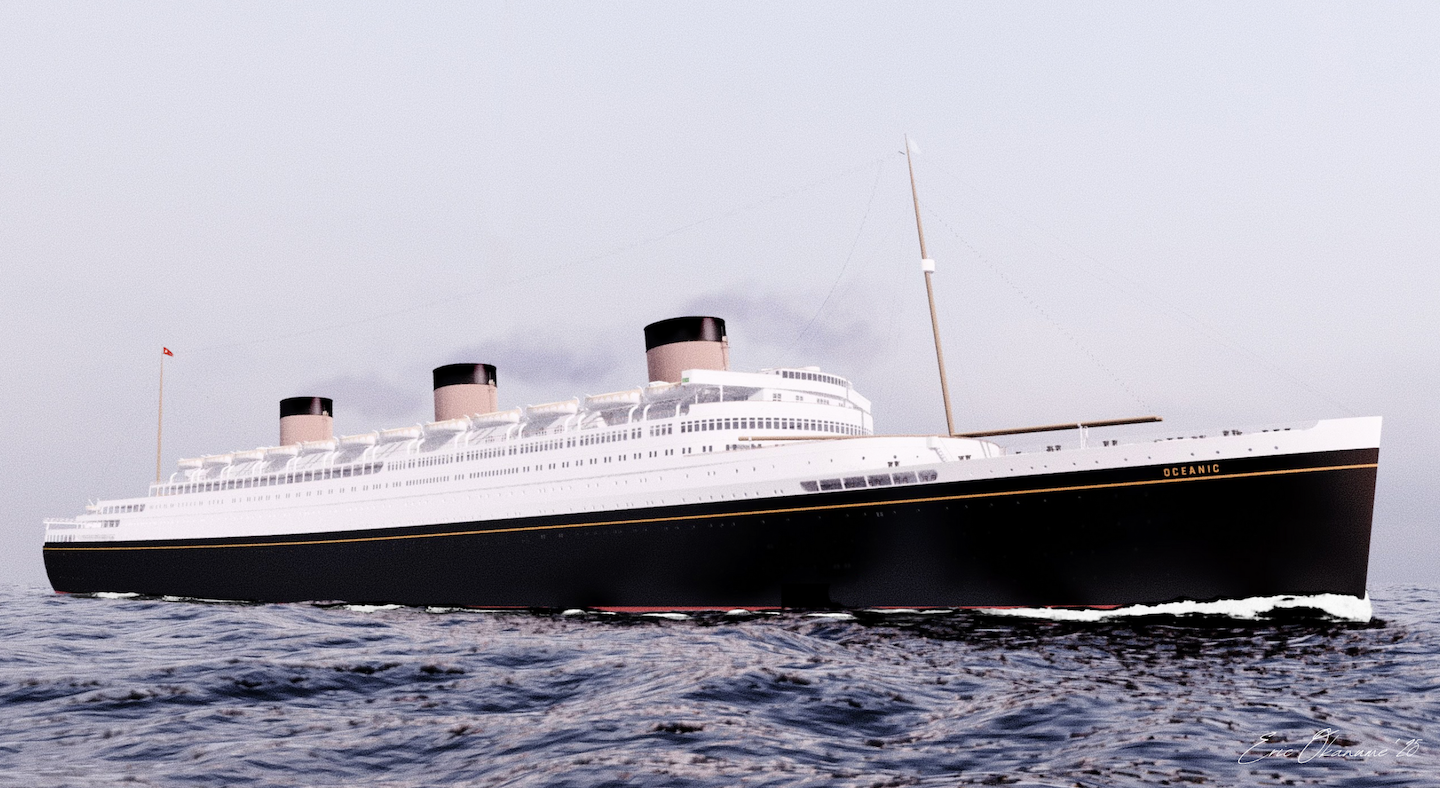
- Artist's rendition of RMMV Oceanic

History

United Kingdom
- Name: RMMV Oceanic
- Owner: White Star Line (intended)
- Operator: White Star Line (intended)
- Port of registry: Liverpool (intended)
- Ordered: 18 June 1928
- Builder: Harland and Wolff, Belfast (keel laid only)
- Yard number: 844
- Laid down: 28 June 1928
- Fate: Construction halted on 23 July 1929; cancelled May 1930; and dismantled on slipway November 1931

General characteristics
- Class & type: Ocean liner
- Tonnage: 70,000–85,000 GRT (estimated)
- Length: 1,050 ft (320.0 m) (intended)
- Beam: 120 ft (36.6 m) (estimated)
- Draught: 38 ft (11.6 m) (intended)
- Decks: 12 (intended)
- Installed power: Diesel-electric drive; 44 six-cylinder, exhaust turbo-charged, four-stroke, single-acting diesel generators; 275,000 IHP (200,000 SHP)
- Propulsion: Quadruple propellers
- Speed: 32.5 knots (60.2 km/h; 37.4 mph) (max. speed)
- Capacity: 3,451 passengers (intended)
- Crew: 1,120 (intended)

Oceanic was the planned name of an unfinished ocean liner that was partially built by Harland and Wolff for the White Star Line. It would have been the third ship bearing the name Oceanic, after the one of 1870 and the one of 1899. It was envisaged in 1926, with the idea of modernizing the transatlantic service of the company. With the arrival of Lord Kylsant at the head of the company, the planned size of the project increased, until it became that of a large ship destined to be the first to exceed the symbolic limit of 1,000 feet (305 m) in length and 30 knots (56 km/h; 35 mph) in speed.

After several years of study, the construction began in June 1928 in the Harland & Wolff shipyards in Belfast. However, the work was carried out at a slow pace and ceased in June 1929, probably because further studies relating to the propulsion were needed. The Great Depression which began the same year and the financial affair which sent Lord Kylsant to prison in 1931 put a definitive end to the construction, for which the government refused to advance funds.

Within the White Star Line fleet, the planned Oceanic was replaced by two smaller ships, MV Britannic and MV Georgic. Oceanic was intended to be 1,050 feet (320 m) and 85,000 tons.

== Birth of the project ==
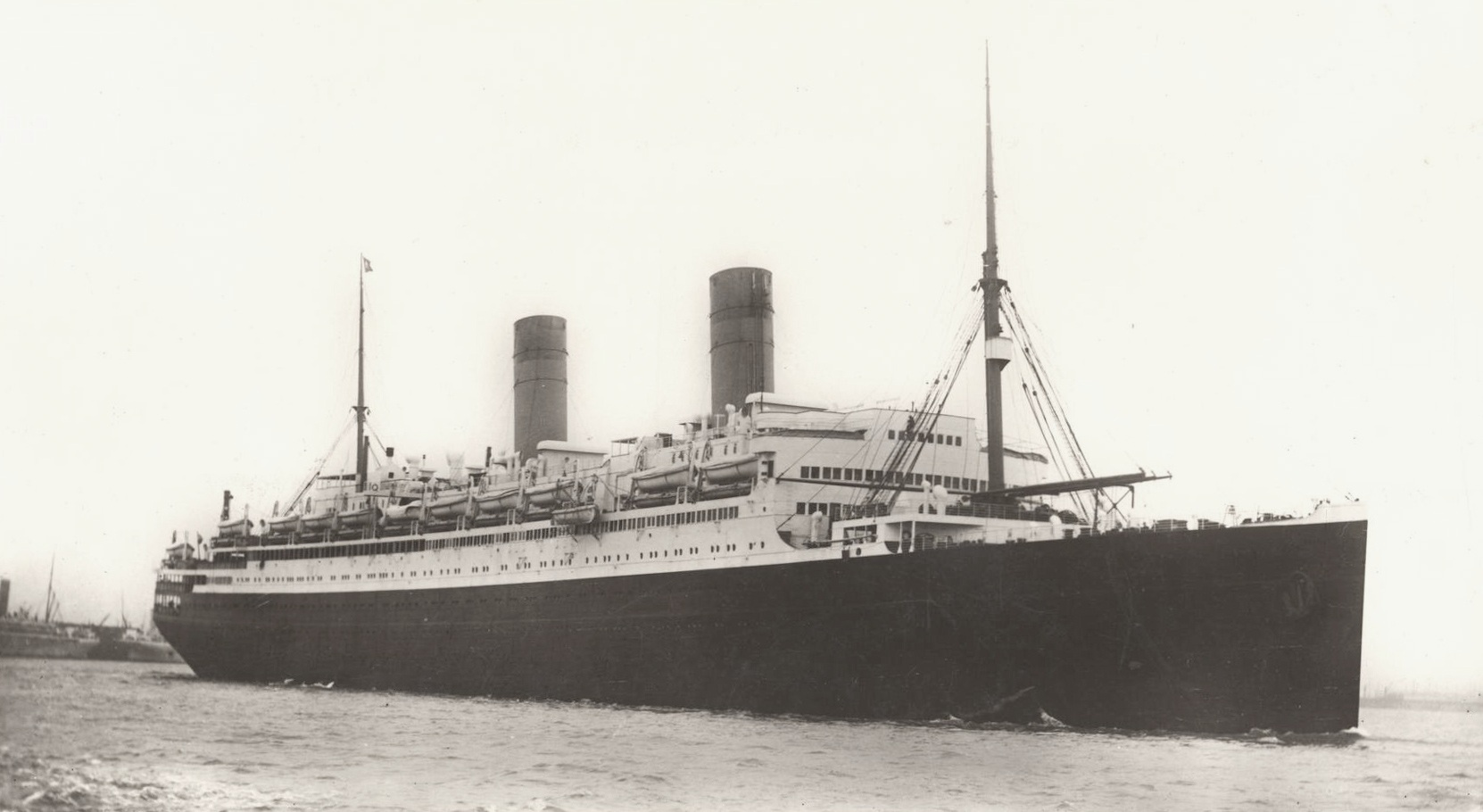
RMS Homeric, which White Star Line wanted to replace

By the early 1910s, the White Star Line had planned to provide regular and cost-effective transatlantic service with its three Olympic-class ships. The loss of Titanic in 1912, then of Britannic in 1916, however, seriously handicapped this aim. Following World War I, the company was given two German liners in compensation for wartime damage, which became RMS Majestic and RMS Homeric. Both were assigned to the transatlantic service alongside RMS Olympic, the only surviving ship of the initially planned trio. It quickly turned out, however, that while Majestic and Olympic had relatively equivalent profiles, reaching roughly the same speed (between 22 and 24 knots, 41 and 44 km/h, 25 and 28 mph respectively) and the same passenger capacities, Homeric was significantly smaller and slower (19 knots, 35 km/h, 22 mph only). Additionally, the ship was less successful compared to its fellow liners. In fact, its career did not last long and it left the North Atlantic route in 1932, only ten years after its entry into service.

It was in August 1926 that a press release about a project from the company appeared for the first time, indicating the imminent construction of a 25-knot ship to replace Homeric. This ship must then, according to the press releases, be of a profile close to that of the Olympic-class vessels. The same year, in November, the International Mercantile Marine Co., a trust that owned the White Star Line, decided to separate from its non-American companies. The company was then bought by Owen Philipps, 1st Baron Kylsant, who integrated it into his company, the Royal Mail Steam Packet Company, the largest maritime conglomerate of the period. Lord Kylsant, who was also the owner of the Harland & Wolff shipyards in Belfast, decided to have the planned ship built there. Studies for the planned construction were carried out over many months.

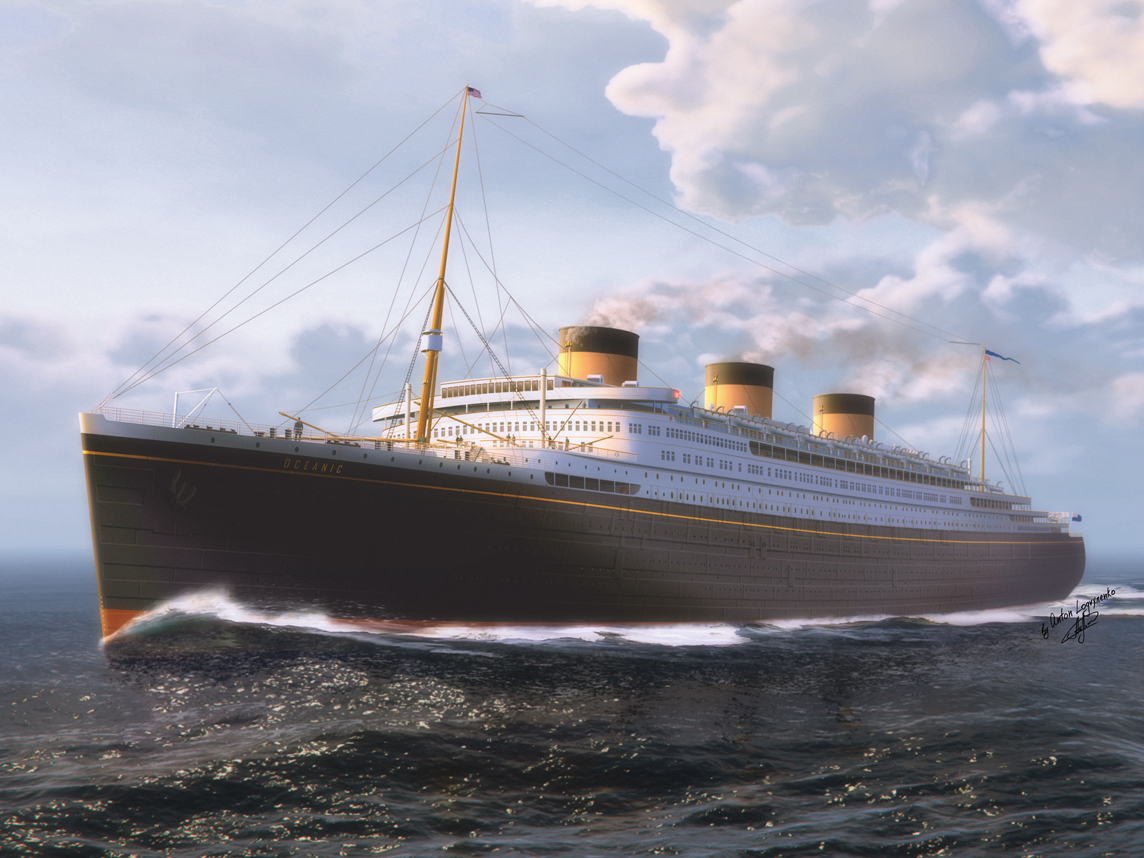
Digital drawing of the planned ocean liner RMMV Oceanic

On 14 April 1927, construction of a fleetmate Britannic began in Harland & Wolff. Britannic was a smaller version of the proposed liner, but of similar design. However, it was not until 18 June 1928 that a contract was signed to build the proposed liner; construction began ten days later. The liner was to be named Oceanic, in reference to the very first liner put into service by White Star after its purchase by Thomas Henry Ismay in 1871. Estimates gave it a length of over 300 metres (984 ft), 60,000−80,000 gross register tons (GRT), and a cost of £3.5 million, making it the largest liner ever built and the first to exceed the symbolic 1,000-foot mark. Construction of the ship's keel began with great fanfare ten days after the contract was signed. The only existing plans of the ship remained sketchy and only allowed for understanding the general arrangement, but they did give an idea of the capacity of the liner: it would carry 722 passengers in first class, 464 in second, and 1,096 in third, and also 240 interchangeable seats between first and second class, and 286 between second and third, for a total of 2,808 passengers.

== Economic crisis and cancellation ==
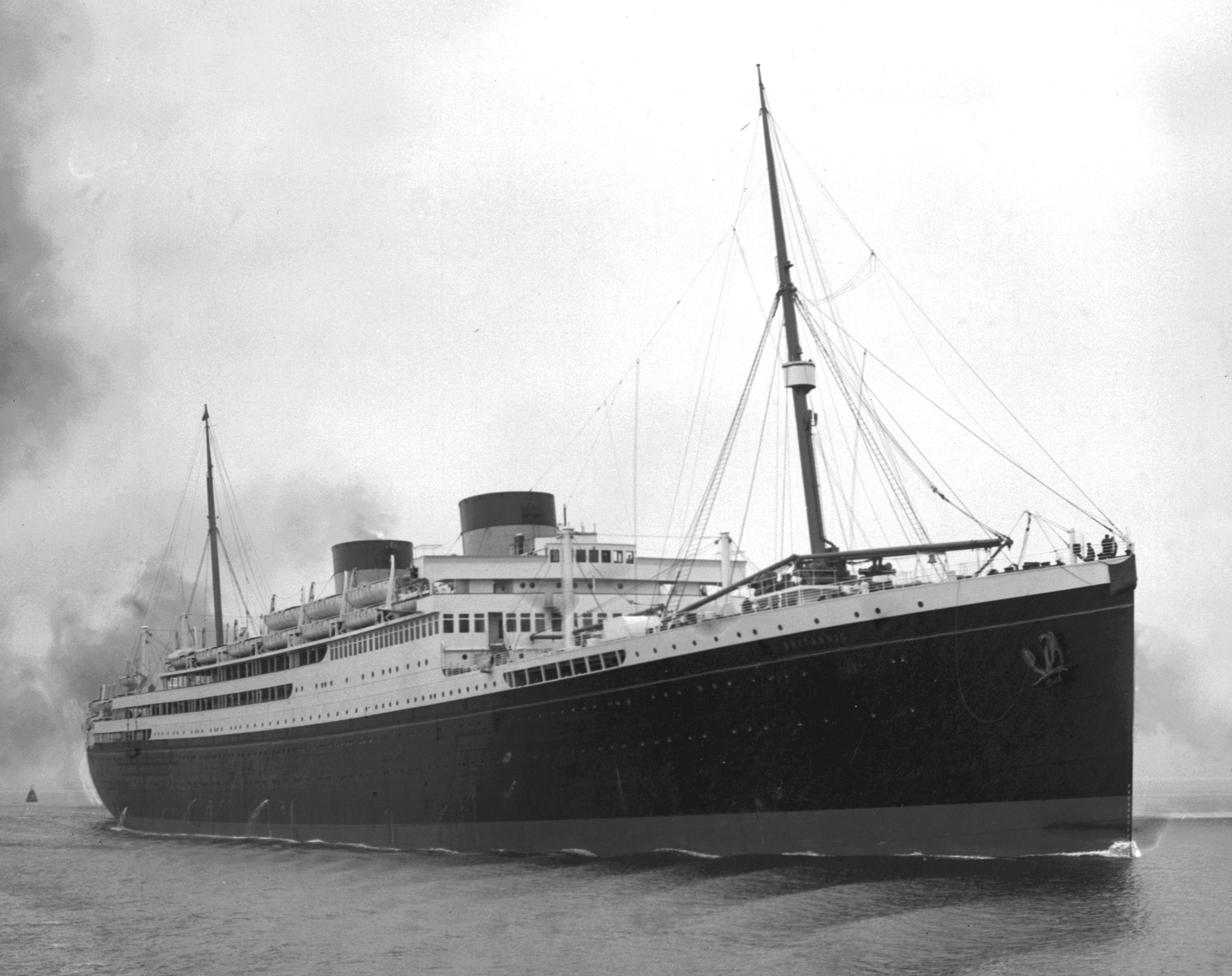
Britannic was launched by Harland & Wolff in 1929. Construction of Britannic was given priority over that of Oceanic.

However, construction was proceeding at a very slow pace, to such an extent that a year later, the keel was still not completed. The work was slowed by a dispute over her powerplant; Lord Kylsant planned to use diesel-electric instead of the then more common steam power to get the ship to 32 knots, however Harland and Wolff suggested using steam-electric or the more common geared steam turbine setup used on large passenger liners of the era like the then still in construction Queen Mary. The cost effectiveness of all three powerplants was debated and calculated with diesel-electric coming out to be the cheapest with an estimated £52,800 annual reduction in cost compared to steam-electric. This would have made the Oceanic the first ship of her size and tonnage to use diesel-electric, and far more cheaper to run in comparison to her competition giving her a leg up over the Queen Mary. Her proposed powerplant would have had over 40 diesel generator sets driving four propellers through geared electric motors. Despite construction on Oceanic slowing down, construction of the smaller Britannic continued without issues.

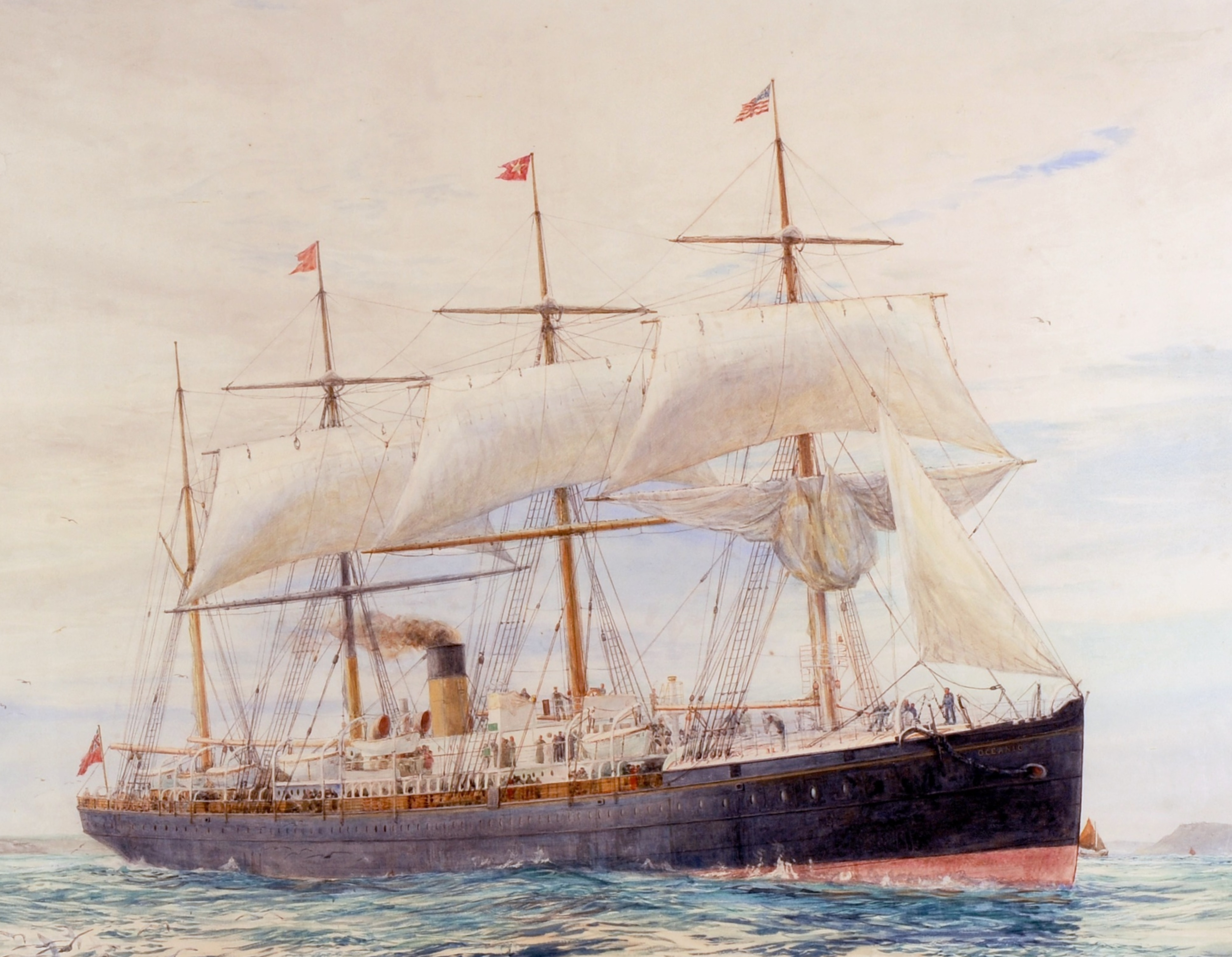
SS Oceanic (1870)

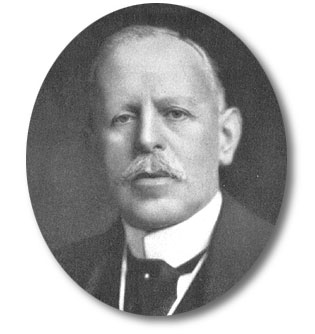
Lord Kylsant

Further work on Oceanic was postponed after which the keel was coated in preservative oil in hopes construction would resume but the project was later cancelled due to the Great Depression and the collapse of the Royal Mail Steam Packet Company, owners of the White Star Line, as a result of the financial problems of Lord Kylsant. The Royal Mail Case, as it was known, led to the imprisonment of Kylsant, and to substantial changes in accounting and auditing practice. Loans backed by the governments of England and Northern Ireland intended for the construction of Oceanic were diverted to complete the construction of Britannic, as well as to start construction of a sister ship to Britannic named Georgic. These two liners were partially built with steel plates ordered for Oceanic, whose partially built hull was subsequently dismantled and reused on Britannic and Georgic after the aforementioned diversion of funds.

== Legacy ==
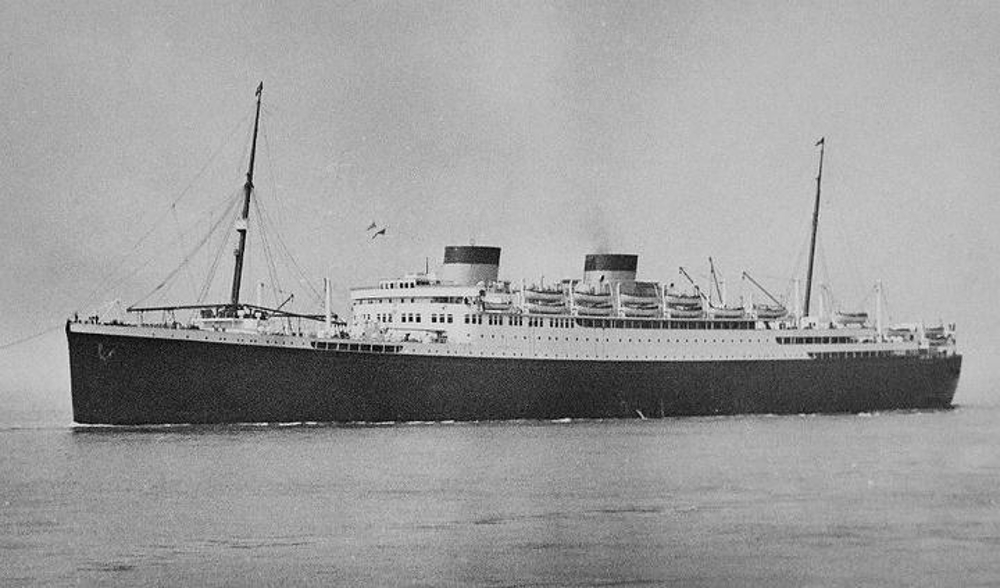
Georgic inherited several more features of Oceanic's planned designs, and her construction began after the cancellation of this ship.

In total, of the estimated cost of £3.5 million, £150,000 was spent on Oceanic's design and start of construction. These sums were not, however, totally lost. Part of the design had already inspired MV Britannic, who, despite being smaller, largely reproduced the silhouette of the aborted ship she was meant to supplement, in particular her packed funnels and motor propulsion. The liner entered service in 1930 and enjoyed some success. To replace Oceanic, MV Georgic, a sister ship of Britannic, was built and put into service in 1932. Georgic differed in appearance from Britannic in that the forward part of her superstructure and bridge was rounded instead of straight, and the front part of her promenade deck was covered. These features were carried over to Georgic from Oceanic.

These two intermediate liners could not replace large ships like Majestic and Olympic and construction of a large liner remained on the agenda. The Cunard Line also had to stop the construction of its own large liner because of the economic crisis. Neville Chamberlain, then Chancellor of the Exchequer, pushed the shipping companies White Star and Cunard to merge in 1934, with the promise to help them finish the liner. This is how the Cunard-White Star Limited was formed and construction of the RMS Queen Mary was able to resume. In 1947 Cunard purchased White Star's interest, and by 1949 the company had dropped the White Star name and was renamed Cunard Line, which continued to operate Britannic and Georgic. In 1956, Georgic was sold for scrap, leaving Britannic as the last liner of the White Star Line in service. In 1960, Cunard sold the Britannic for scrap, removing the last traces of the Oceanic.

In appearance the planned Oceanic had certain features that make it akin to the liner SS Normandie, including the three short, wide funnels that contrasted with the tall narrow stacks of older ships. Designed shortly after Oceanic, the 300 meter-plus Normandie was the first to exceed the symbolic barriers of 1000 feet in length and 30 knots in speed that the White Star Line was aiming for.

In 2022, a group of maritime historians established the Oceanic Historical Society, an independent research group dedicated to locating and studying surviving plans and documentation related to the liner.

== Bibliography ==
- Chirnside, Mark (2004). The Olympic-Class Ships. Stroud: Tempus. ISBN 978-0-7524-2868-0.
- Eaton, John; Haas, Charles (1989). Falling Star, Misadventures of White Star Line Ships. Patrick Stephens Ltd. ISBN 1-85260-084-5.
- Williams, David; de Kerbrech, Richard (1982). Damned by Destiny. Brighton: Teredo books. ISBN 0-903662-09-4. OCLC 10284842.
