= MV Georgic =

Ocean liner scrapped 1956

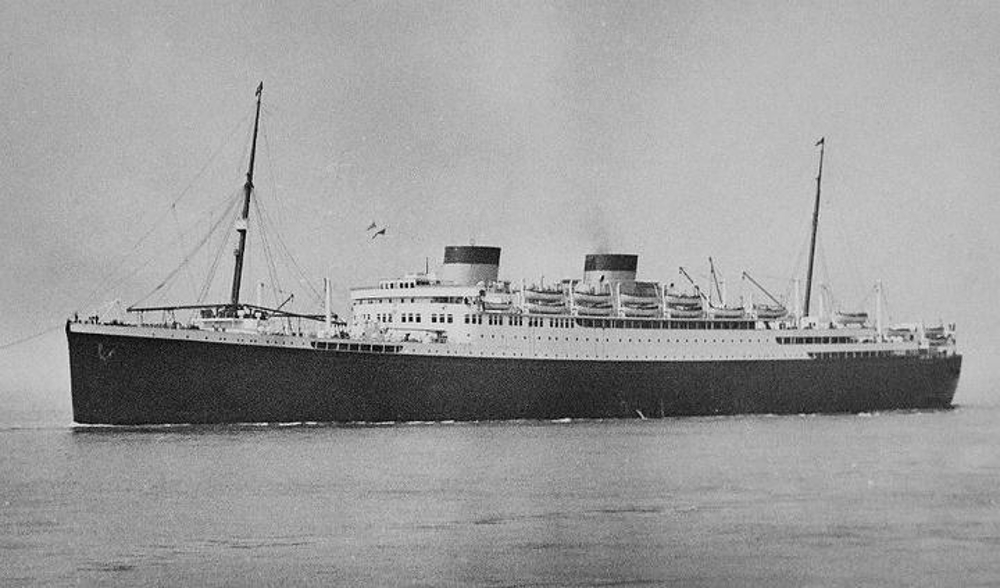
- MV Georgic, c. 1933

History

United Kingdom
- Name: Georgic
- Owner: 1932–1934: White Star Line; 1934–1944: Cunard-White Star Line; 1944–1946: Ministry of War Transport; 1946–1956: Ministry of Transport
- Operator: 1932–1934: White Star Line; 1934–1949: Cunard-White Star Line; 1949–1956: Cunard Line
- Route: Liverpool - New York
- Builder: Harland and Wolff
- Yard number: 896
- Laid down: 30 November 1929
- Launched: 12 November 1931
- Completed: 10 June 1932
- Maiden voyage: 25 June 1932
- In service: 1932–1941, 1945–1956
- Out of service: 1956
- Fate: Bombed and partially sunk July 1941, salvaged by Shipbreaking Industries Ltd October 1941, refloated and refurbished 1941–44, resumed service as a troop transport in 1945, resumed civilian service 1948, scrapped in 1956 at Faslane, Scotland.

General characteristics
- Type: Ocean liner
- Tonnage: 27,759 gross register tons
- Length: 712 ft (217.0 m)
- Beam: 82.4 ft (25.1 m)
- Propulsion: Twin propellers, diesel propulsion
- Speed: 18 knots (33 km/h; 21 mph)
- Capacity: 1,542 passengers

MV Georgic was the last ship built for the White Star Line before its merger with the Cunard Line. Built at Harland and Wolff shipyard in Belfast, she was the running mate and younger sister of MV Britannic. Like Britannic, Georgic was a motorship, and not a steamer, fitted with a diesel powerplant. At the time of her launch in 1931, she was the largest British motorship.

After a successful career as a liner in the 1930s, Georgic was requisitioned as a troopship in 1940. She was severely damaged and partially sunk in 1941 by a German bombing raid whilst docked at Port Tewfik in Egypt. After being refloated and extensively rebuilt, she returned to service as a troopship in 1944, and continued in service for both military and civilian uses until 1956, when she was withdrawn from service and scrapped.

== Background ==
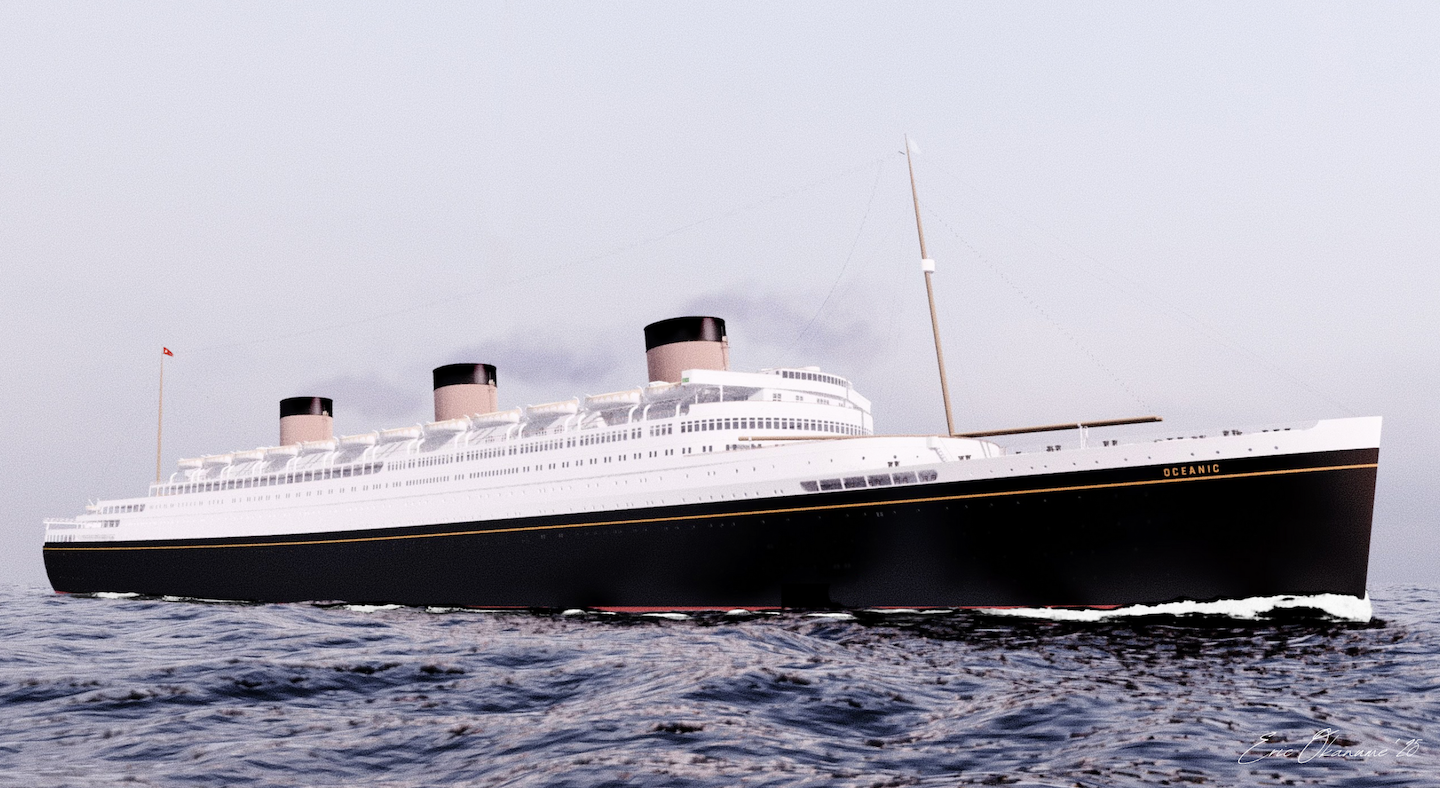
Georgic inherited several of Oceanic's design elements. Construction of Georgic was started following the cancellation of Oceanic.

In the late-1920s, White Star Line had planned to build two new liners to replace their aging fleet, both of which were to be motorships rather than traditional steamships: a 1,000 foot (300 m) long superliner known as Oceanic, and a smaller more economic liner of a similar design known as Britannic. Work started on Britannic in 1927 and she was launched in 1929, work started on Oceanic in 1928, and the keel was laid, however financial problems meant that work on Oceanic was delayed in September 1929 and the project was eventually abandoned the following year. Instead White Star decided to prioritize the construction of a more economical sister ship to Britannic. White Star Line had initially considered naming the sister ship Germanic, but it was instead decided that she would be known as Georgic. She would be the second White Star ship to bear the name Georgic; an earlier SS Georgic had served the company between 1895 and 1916.

== Design and construction ==
In design the Georgic was essentially a slightly larger version of her earlier sister ship Britannic, having a gross tonnage of 27,759, compared with Britannic's 26,943. Georgic differed in appearance from Britannic in that the forward part of her superstructure and bridge was rounded instead of straight, and the front part of her promenade deck was covered. Like Britannic, Georgic had two short stumpy funnels, the forward one of which was a dummy which housed the radio room and the engineers smoke room.

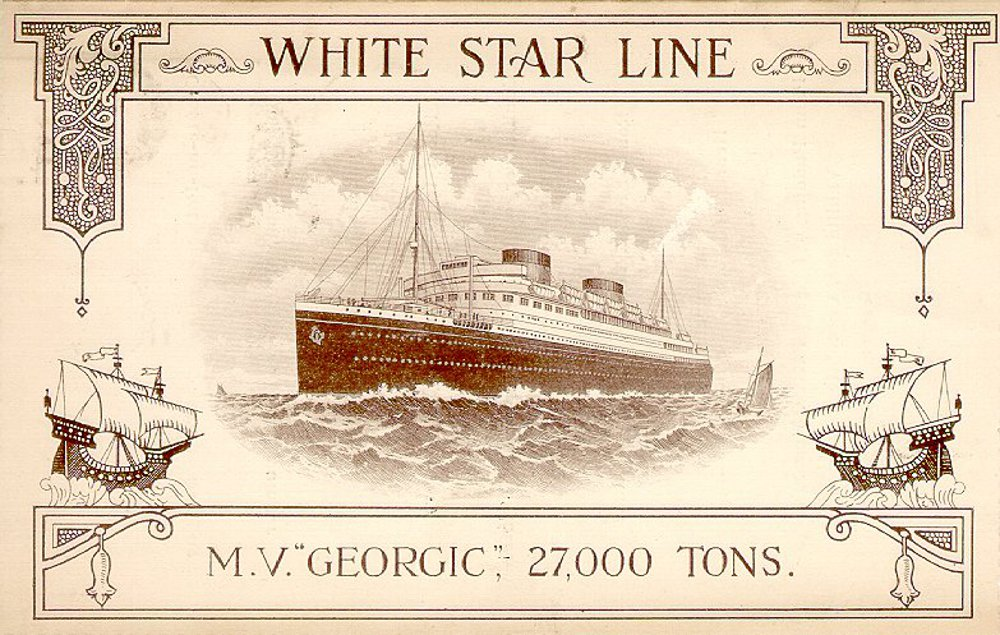
Georgic in an early 1930s letter card

Georgic's powerplant was identical to that of her sister, consisting of two 10 cylinder, four stroke, double acting diesel engines, designed by Burmeister & Wain. At the time these were the largest and most powerful engines of their type constructed; they were coupled to two propellers, and could produce 20,000 brake horsepower; these could propel the ship at a design service speed of 18 knots (33 km/h; 21 mph), although she often averaged 18.5 knots in service.

Georgic's interiors were decorated in the then popular Art Deco style, which differed from those of Britannic which were decorated in various period styles which had been popular in the 1920s. Georgic's passenger capacities were given as 479 Cabin class, 557 Tourist class and 506 Third class. In addition to passenger accommodation, Georgic also had some refrigerated cargo capacity in two of her holds. Her hull was divided into eight holds by twelve main bulkheads.

Construction began on 9 July 1929, and she was launched on 12 November 1931, and, after fitting out, commenced her sea trials on 4 June 1932, after which she was ready for service.

== Early career ==
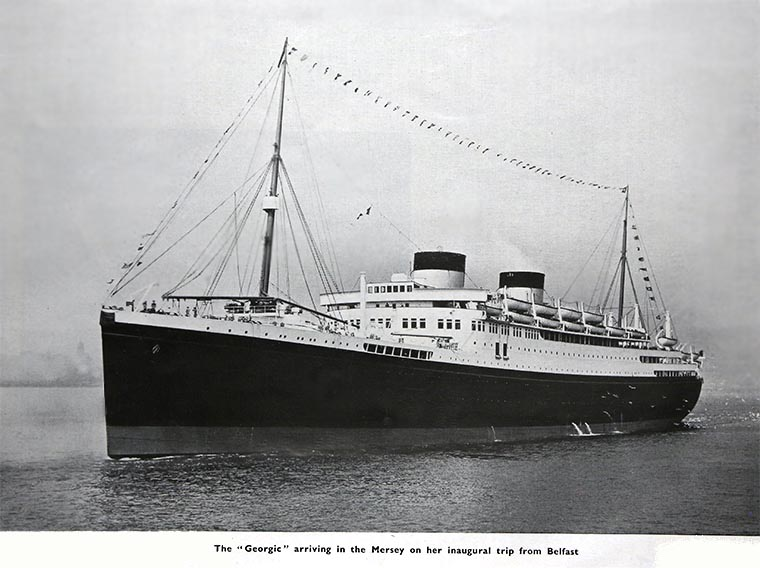
Georgic arriving in the River Mersey on her maiden voyage, June 1932

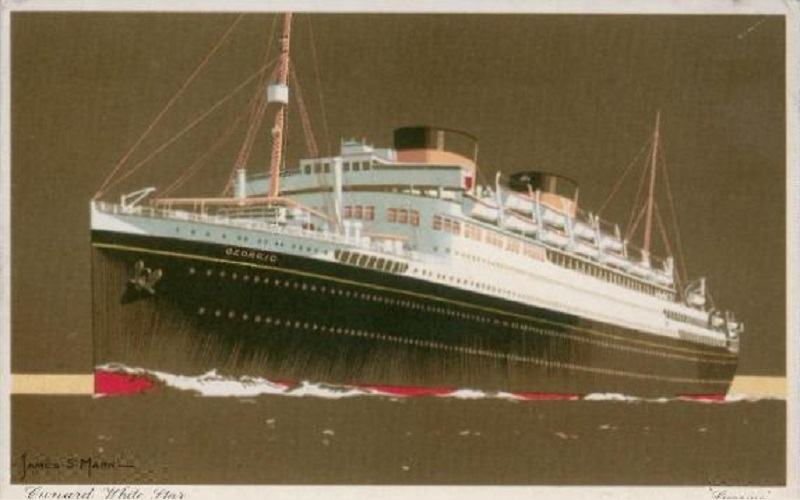
Georgic in a Cunard-White Star's postcard

Georgic started her maiden voyage on 25 June 1932. She was built for the Liverpool–New York route and ran in tandem with Britannic. On 2 April 1933, she replaced the aging RMS Olympic on the Southampton–New York route for a brief time while that vessel was overhauled.

Although not the largest or fastest liners of their time, Georgic and Britannic proved popular, and were in the early-1930s the two most profitable ships in White Star Line's fleet, partly due to their lower running costs and more affordable ticket prices compared to the traditional steamships. They helped keep the company afloat financially during the Great Depression.

On 10 May 1934 White Star Line merged with its old rival the Cunard Line and the ship became part of the fleet of the newly amalgamated Cunard-White Star Line, both ships however retained their White Star livery and houseflag, but with the addition of the Cunard houseflag. The following year Georgic and Britannic were transferred to the London−Le Havre−Southampton−New York route, and Georgic commenced service on this route on 3 May 1935, making Georgic the largest ship to sail up the River Thames and use the Port of London. She continued to serve this route until the outbreak of World War II in 1939. On the outbreak of war, Georgic was not immediately commandeered, but was instead transferred back to the Liverpool to New York route in September 1939, and made five round trips before being requisitioned for trooping duties on 11 March 1940.

== Wartime career ==
In April 1940, Georgic was hastily converted into a troopship with the capacity for 3,000 troops. In May that year she assisted in the evacuation of British troops from the failed Norwegian Campaign, from the port of Narvik, and in June assisted in Operation Aerial, evacuating troops from the French ports of Brest and Saint-Nazaire, at the latter, the troopship Lancastria was bombed and sunk on 17 June with the loss of at least 2,888 lives. Between July and September 1940, she sailed to Iceland and then to Halifax, Nova Scotia to transport Canadian soldiers. Georgic then made a variety of journeys from Liverpool and Glasgow to the Middle East via the Cape, along with journeys between Liverpool, New York and Canada. Between May 1940 and July 1941, Georgic transported around 25,000 troops, mostly to the Middle East.

=== Bombing ===
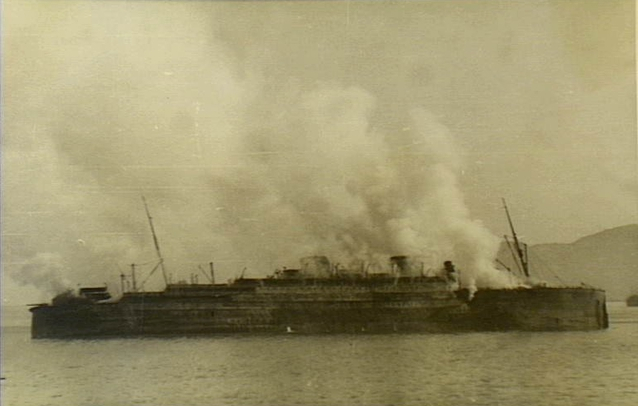
Georgic on fire and grounded at Port Tewfik, Egypt

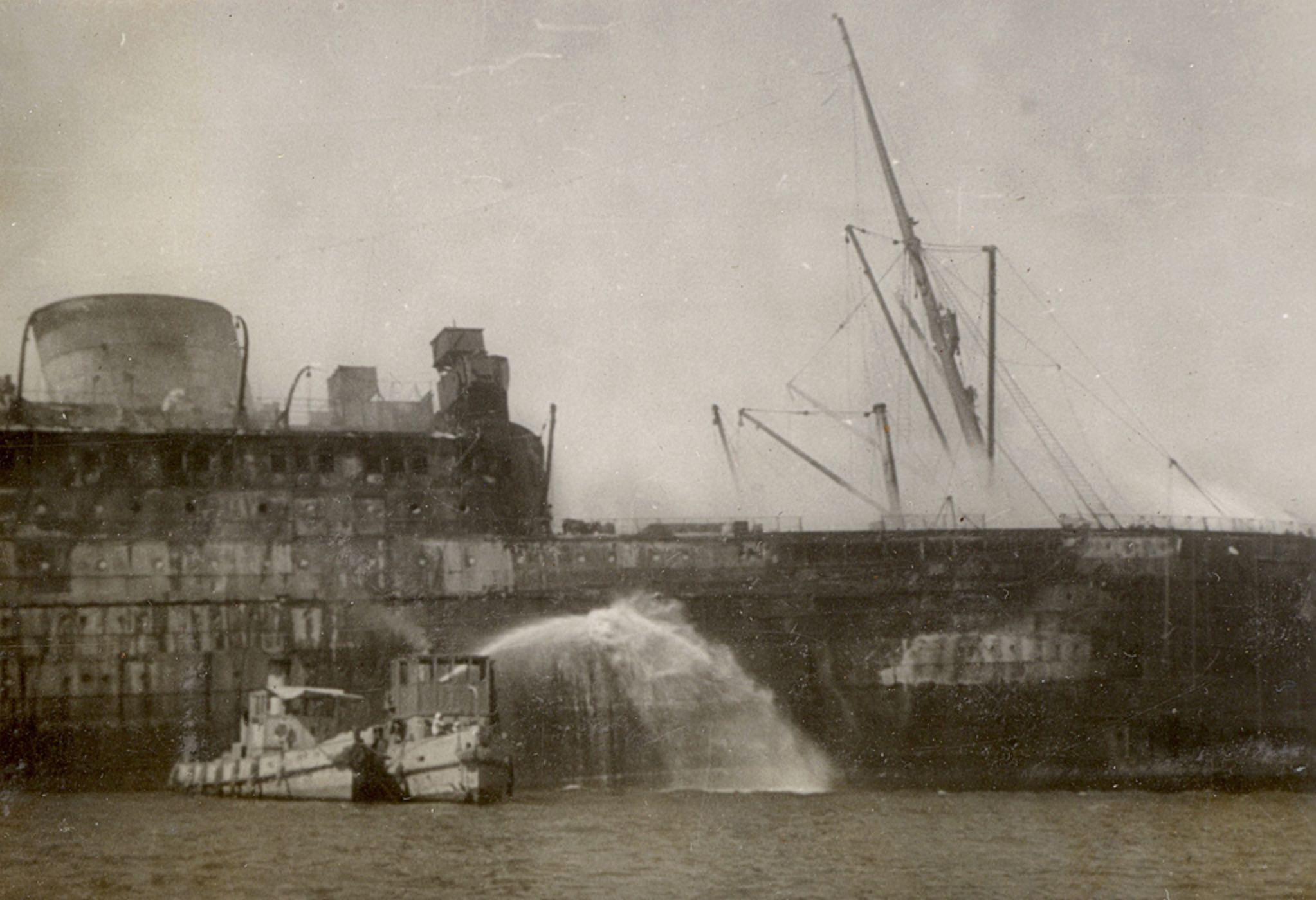
Georgic burnt out

On 22 May 1941, Georgic left Glasgow under the command of Captain A.G. Greig with the 50th (Northumbrian) Infantry Division bound for Port Tewfik in the Gulf of Suez via the Cape. She was part of a convoy which had to be left almost unprotected due to the hunt for the German battleship Bismarck, but arrived safely on 7 July and the troops on board were disembarked. One week later on 14 July 1941, while she was anchored off Port Tewfik waiting to embark 800 Italian detainees, German aircraft, sweeping the waterway for targets, spotted her and proceeded to attack. After several misses, the ship was hit by two bombs; the first one glanced off the side and exploded in the water, causing considerable damage to the ship's hull near the No.4 hold, causing heavy flooding, the second one hit the aft end of the boat deck, penetrated five decks, and exploded in a lift shaft, causing extensive damage to the No.5 hold, this started a fire which ignited fuel oil from ruptured fuel tanks; the fire ignited ammunition stored in the aft holds causing an explosion, which engulfed the entire rear end of the ship in flames.

Despite the heavy damage, the ship's engineers were still able to start the engines, and Captain Greig was able to manoeuvre the blazing ship onto a reef in the middle of Suez Bay in order to beach it, so it would not block the busy channel, while doing this Georgic collided with another ship, HMS Glenearn, which resulted in Georgic's stem being badly twisted. By this stage the flames had spread to the upper decks. As she started to sink, the order was soon given to abandon ship, and all on board managed to escape via the lifeboats. The Georgic slowly settled by the stern onto the shallow reef and was left to burn out over the next two days, by which time the ship was half submerged, the engine room flooded, and the superstructure, gutted by the fire, was a blackened, twisted shell.

=== Salvage and rebuilding ===
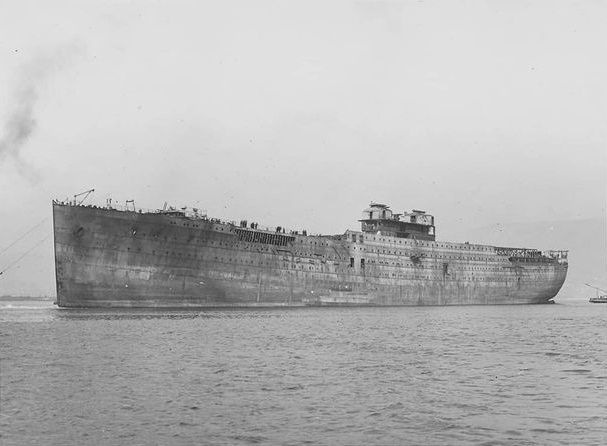
Hulk of Georgic before reconstruction. The superstructure has already been dismantled

On 14 September, the damage to Georgic was assessed and it was decided that the ship was salvageable, as the basic hull structure and machinery were still mostly intact. Georgic then underwent a lengthy salvage and refurbishment operation which took a total of three years, which the historian Richard De Kerbrech described as "one of the greatest feats in the history of salvage". During October the ship had its holes and openings temporarily plugged and then the water was pumped out to refloat the vessel. In December, Georgic, now afloat and at an anchorage, had its temporary plugs replaced by more permanent cement boxes to make the vessel seaworthy. As Georgic had no power, light or accommodation, she had to be towed as an abandoned hulk; as no tugs were available, two British cargo ships, Clan Campbell and City of Sydney were allocated to the task. Beginning on 29 December, they first towed Georgic to Port Sudan taking 13 days. Here Georgic underwent further repairs lasting eight weeks to make her seaworthy for the longer voyage to Karachi.

On 5 March 1942, Georgic left Port Sudan under tow of the Harrison Line's liner Recorder and the tug St Sampson, which later proved to be too small for the task and had to slip after one day. On the eighth day they were joined by another tug, Pauline Moller and the British steamer Haresfield, who together successfully brought Georgic into Karachi on 31 March. Here it was decided that Georgic would undergo essential repairs which did not require dry docking: Taking eight months to complete with limited resources, her engines and generators were restored to working order, her stem was straightened, and some crew accommodation was rebuilt on board. In December 1942, Georgic left Karachi under her own power for Bombay, her engines managing a speed of 11 knots (20 km/h; 13 mph). At Bombay she was dry docked and the damage to her hull repaired, her machinery was also given a further overhaul. Georgic then left Bombay for the UK on 20 January 1943, arriving at Liverpool on 1 March, having completed the entire journey unescorted at an average speed of 15 knots (28 km/h; 17 mph).

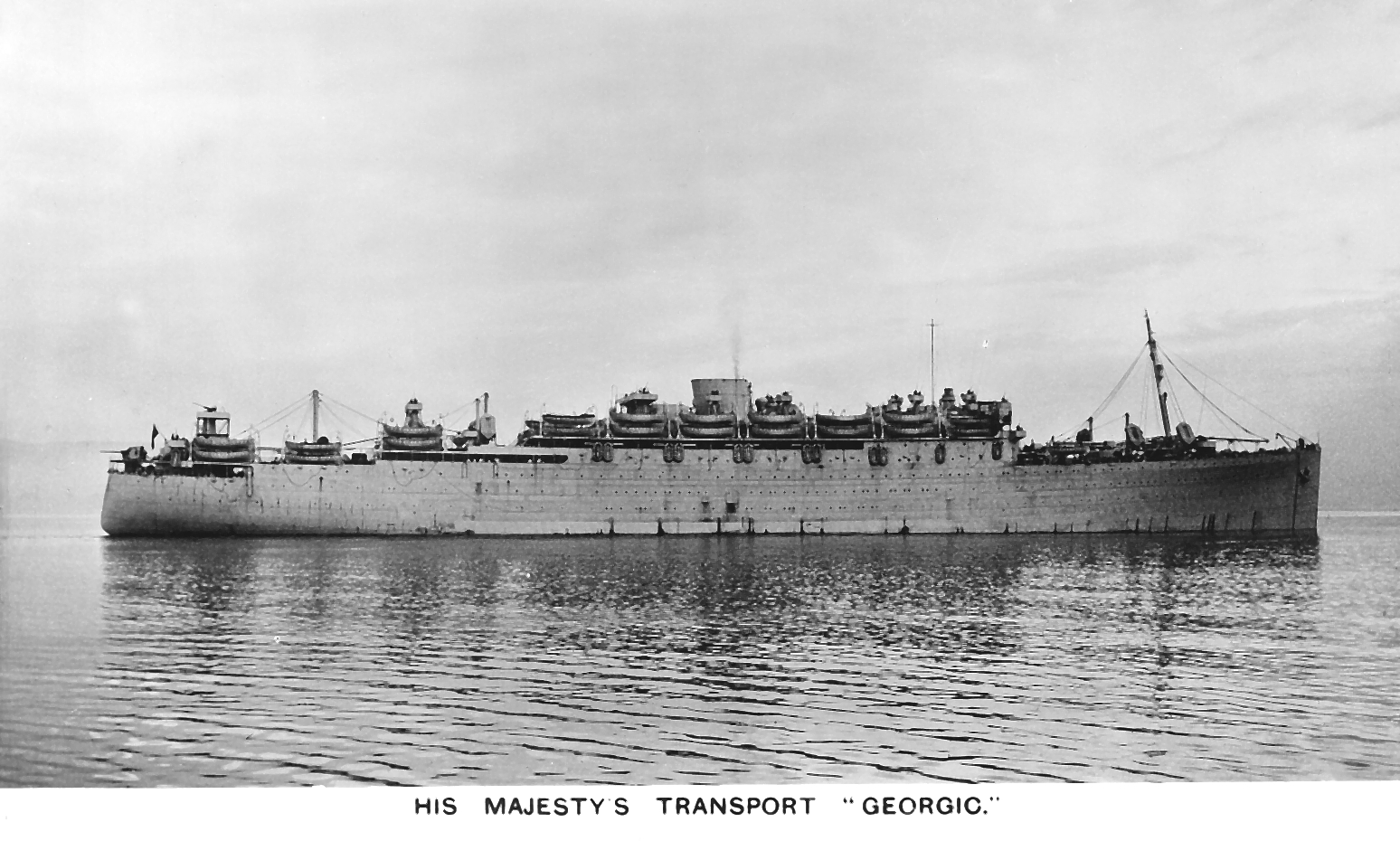
Georgic following her rebuild, in service as a troopship

A survey of the ship was then carried out by the Admiralty and the Ministry of War Transport (MoWT), and a decision was made to send the ship back to Harland and Wolff in Belfast to be completely rebuilt into a troopship. During the rebuild, over 5,000 tons of fire gutted steel were removed from Georgic, and her upper decks and superstructure were completely rebuilt, she emerged from her rebuild after 19 months in December 1944 with a considerably changed appearance: Her forward funnel and mainmast were removed, and the foremast shortened to a stump. Following the rebuild, Georgic became a government owned ship, with her ownership transferred to the Ministry of War Transport, Cunard-White Star managed the ship on their behalf.

== Later career ==
On 17 December 1944 Georgic resumed service as a troop transport between Italy, the Middle East and India. After the war ended in 1945, she spent the next three years repatriating troops, civilians and prisoners of war. By 1948, with trooping requirements falling off, and the advent of the Australian government's Assisted Passage Migration Scheme for British emigrants to Australia, the Ministry of Transport decided to restore Georgic for civilian service as a migrant ship, with the requirement that she could be converted again for trooping duties if the need arose.

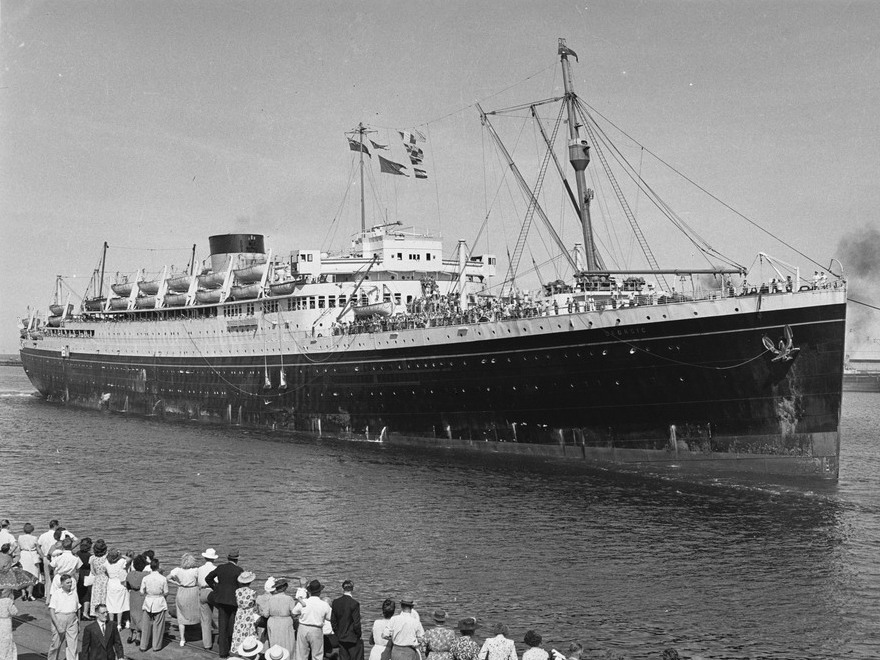
Georgic in Australia while she was operating as a migrant transport ship, photographed in February 1949

In September 1948 Georgic was sent to the Palmers yard on the Tyne to be refitted as an emigrant ship with a single-class accommodation of 1,962. Georgic had her White Star colours restored in the refit, however she was by now very much a utilitarian vessel, as her interiors were not restored to their pre-war luxury standards. Between January 1949 and October 1953 Georgic was operated on the UK-Australia emigrant service, operated by Cunard, but chartered by the Australian government.

During the summer high seasons from 1950 to 1954, Cunard also chartered Georgic from the MoT for some journeys from Liverpool or Southampton to New York in concert with her sister Britannic to meet additional demand. Georgic was chartered for six round transatlantic voyages during 1950, and seven round voyages per season during 1951–54.

From November 1953 to April 1955, Georgic was again used for trooping duties as she was commissioned to carry Commonwealth troops returning from the Korean War, although in between this she made her last seven round voyages from Southampton to New York chartered by Cunard during the 1954 high season. In January 1955 the MoT announced that Georgic would be withdrawn from service and put up for sale by August of that year: By this stage Georgic's war-scarred machinery was proving troublesome. The MoT did offer to transfer ownership of Georgic back to Cunard, but they declined. However she was withdrawn from sale when she was chartered by the Australian government for one more season on the emigrant run. She made her last voyage to Australia in August that year. Georgic's final voyage was from Hong Kong to Liverpool in November 1955, carrying 800 troops. On her arrival on 19 November she was withdrawn from service. The ship was finally laid up at Kames Bay, Isle of Bute, pending disposal, and then sold for scrap in January 1956. The following month Georgic arrived at Faslane for breaking up. Scrapping of the Georgic was completed by late 1956.
