= SS Lavia =

- RMS Media

History
- Name: Media (1946–61); Flavia (1961–82); Flavian (1983–86); Lavia (1986–89)
- Owner: Cunard White Star Line (1947–50); Cunard Line (1950–61); Compagnia Genovese de Armamento SpA (1961–69); Costa Armatori SpA (1969–82); Flavian Shipping SA (1982–86); Lavia Shipping SA (1986–89)
- Operator: Cunard White Star Line (1947–50); Cunard Line (1950–61); Cogedar Line (1961–69); Costa Line (1969–82); C Y Tung Group (1982–86); Virtue Shipping Company (1986–89)
- Port of registry: (United Kingdom) Liverpool (1947–61); (Italy) Genoa (1961–82); Panama City (1982–89)
- Route: Liverpool–New York (1947–61); Bremerhaven – Rotterdam – Tilbury – Curaçao – Panama Canal – Papeete – Auckland – Sydney – Melbourne – Fremantle – Aden – Suez Canal – Port Said – Cannes – Tilbury – Rotterdam – Bremerhaven (1962–67); Bremerhaven – Rotterdam – Tilbury – Curaçao – Panama Canal – Papeete – Auckland – Sydney – Melbourne – South Africa – Tilbury – Rotterdam – Bremerhaven (1967–68); Miami–Bahamas (1968–77, 1978–82)
- Builder: John Brown & Co Ltd, Clydebank
- Yard number: 629
- Launched: 12 December 1946
- Completed: August 1947
- Maiden voyage: 20 August 1947
- Identification: UK Official Number 181093 (1947–61); Italian Official Number 3260 (1961–69); Italian Official Number 1069 (1969–82); IMO number: 5116139 (1961–89)
- Fate: Caught fire 7 January 1989, scrapped June 1989

General characteristics
- Type: Passenger-Cargo liner (1947–61); Ocean liner (1961–69); Cruise ship (1969–89)
- Tonnage: 13,345 GRT, 7,480 NRT (1947–61); 15,456 GRT (1961–89)
- Length: 531 ft (161.85 m) (1947–61); 557 ft (169.77 m) (1961–89)
- Beam: 70 ft (21.34 m)
- Draught: 26 ft (7.92 m)
- Installed power: Two steam turbines 15,000 hp (11,000 kW), double reduction geared
- Propulsion: Twin propellers
- Speed: 18 knots (33 km/h)
- Capacity: 250 1st class (Media); 1,320 tourist class (Flavia); 850 tourist class (Flavian, Lavia)

Lavia was a cruise ship that caught fire and sank in Hong Kong Harbour in 1989. She was built for Cunard White Star Line in 1947 as the cargo liner Media. In 1961 she was sold to Italy, rebuilt as an ocean liner and renamed Flavia. In 1969, she was refitted as a cruise ship and renamed Flavian. In 1982 she was sold to Panama and renamed Lavia. She was undergoing a refit when the fire occurred. The damage to her was so great that she was scrapped.

== History ==
=== Media ===
Media was built by John Brown & Company, Clydebank, West Dunbartonshire. She was yard number 629 and was launched on 12 December 1946, with completion in August 1947.

Media and her sister ship Parthia were the first ships built for Cunard after the conclusion of World War II, and were built for transatlantic service between Liverpool and New York City. Media's maiden voyage began on 20 August 1947 from Liverpool. She received a major refit in 1953, part of which was the introduction of stabilisers; Media was the first ship on the transatlantic route so equipped. She continued on the transatlantic trade through the late 1950s, by which time competition from jet airliners had cut into her passenger trade, and newer, faster cargo ships had done the same to her cargo trade.

=== Flavia ===
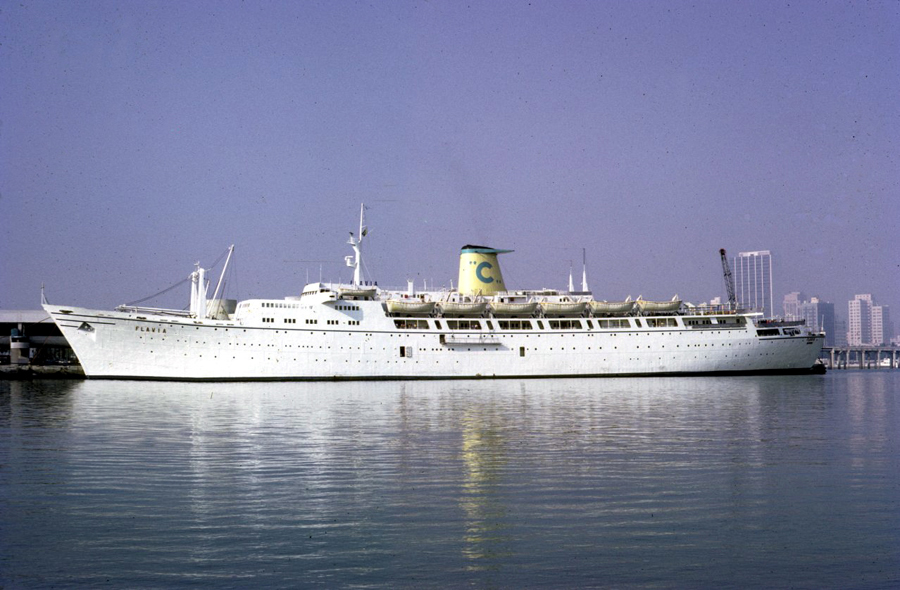
SS Flavia in Miami

In July 1961, Media was sold for £740,000 to the Italian Cogedar Line to replace their Flaminia. She remained in service with Cunard until 30 September. On 12 October she was handed over in Liverpool, arriving at Genoa on 21 October. A nine-month refit by Officine A & R Navi, Genoa transformed her from a passenger-cargo liner to an ocean liner. A new bow increased her length by 26 feet (7.92 m) and a new funnel was provided. The refit increased her tonnage from 13,345 GRT to 15,465 GRT. She could now carry 1,320 tourist class passengers. The ship was renamed Flavia and used for round the world voyages and to transport emigrants to Australia. on 2 October 1962, Flavia departed from Genoa on her maiden voyage for the Cogedar Line. Sailing via the Suez Canal she visited Fremantle, Melbourne and Sydney, arriving on 9 October. Departing from Sydney on 10 October, she sailed to Bremerhaven, which was to be her base for round the world voyages.

The route that Flavia took on her round the world voyages was Bremerhaven – Rotterdam – Tilbury – Curaçao – Panama Canal – Papeete – Auckland – Sydney –Melbourne – Fremantle – Aden – Suez Canal – Port Said – Cannes – Tilbury – Rotterdam – Bremerhaven. With the closure of the Suez Canal in 1967 as a result of the Six-Day War, Flavia sailed via South Africa on her return to Europe. In 1968, the Cogedar Line was taken over by the Costa Line. She was refitted with her accommodation upgraded and a reduction in berths to 850 passengers transformed her into a cruise ship. She was used for cruises from Miami to the Bahamas until July 1977. She was then used for cruises in South America until April 1978, followed by Mediterranean cruises until September 1978, following which she resumed service on the Miami–Bahamas cruises. By the early 1980s, Flavia was showing her age and was becoming too expensive to operate.

=== Flavian ===
She was sold to the Virtue Shipping Company of Hong Kong and renamed Flavian. It was intended to use her as a casino cruise ship but these cruises were unpopular and Flavian spent the majority of the time moored in Hong Kong Harbour.

=== Lavia ===
SS Lavia on fire

In 1982, the ship was renamed Lavia and a refit was started. On 7 January 1989, a workman's fire got out of control. It spread throughout the ship although all nine crew and 35 workmen on board escaped unharmed. Four fireboats and over 250 firefighters tackled the blaze but Lavia sank owing to the vast amounts of water pumped aboard her in an effort to put out the flames. The ship was refloated and towed to Taiwan, where she arrived on 19 June. She was scrapped by Chi Shun Hia Steel of Kaohsiung.

== Description and propulsion ==
Media was 531 feet (161.85 m) long, with a beam of 70 feet (21.34 m) and a draught of 26 feet (7.92 m). She was propelled by two steam turbines of 15,000 horsepower (11,000 kW), double reduction geared, driving twin propellers. These gave her a speed of 18 knots (33 km/h). After her rebuild by Officine A & R Navi, Flavia was 557 feet (169.77 m) long. As built, she was 13,345 GRT and 11,636 DWT, following her rebuild, she was 15,465 GRT.

== Identification ==
Media had the United Kingdom Official Number 181093 from 1947 to 1961. In 1961, the ship was allocated the IMO Number 5116139. Flavia also had the Italian Official Number 3260 from 1961 to 1969 and 1069 from 1969 to 1982.
