= Lavia (surname) =

Lavia is a surname. Notable people with the surname include:

- Daniele Lavia (born 1999), Italian volleyball player
- Gabriele Lavia (born 1942), Italian actor and film director
- Linda Chapa LaVia (born 1966), American politician
- Roméo Lavia (born 2004), Belgian professional footballer
