= RMS Parthia =

Passenger cargo liner

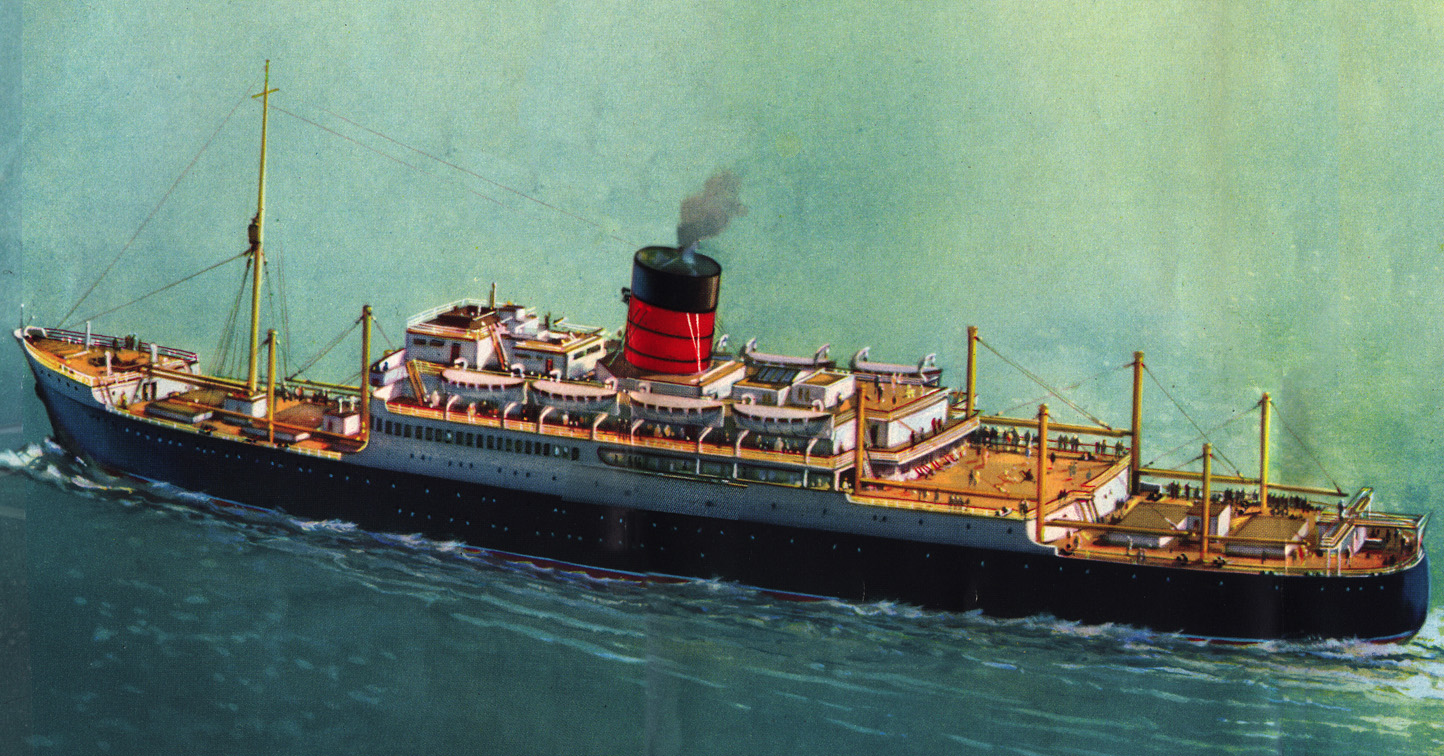
- RMS Parthia

History

United Kingdom
- Name: RMS Parthia
- Owner: Cunard Line
- Port of registry: Liverpool, United Kingdom.
- Route: Liverpool – New York.
- Builder: Harland & Wolff, Belfast
- Yard number: 1331
- Launched: 25 February 1947
- Completed: 7 April 1948
- Maiden voyage: 10 April 1948
- In service: 1948–1961
- Out of service: Sold to New Zealand Shipping Company in 1961
- Identification: UK official number 182417

United Kingdom
- Name: SS Remuera
- Owner: New Zealand Shipping Co.
- Port of registry: London, United Kingdom
- Route: London – Auckland NZ
- Acquired: November 1961
- Maiden voyage: June 1962
- In service: 1962–1964
- Out of service: Sold to Eastern & Australian Steamship Company in 1964

Australia
- Name: SS Aramac
- Owner: Eastern & Australian Steamship Company
- Route: Melbourne-Yokohama
- Maiden voyage: February 1965
- In service: 1965–1969
- Out of service: 1969
- Fate: Scrapped in Taiwan in 1969-70

General characteristics
- Type: Cargo liner
- Tonnage: As built; 13,362 GRT, 7,393 NRT; 1962; 13,619 GRT
- Length: 531.4 ft (162.0 m)
- Beam: 70.3 ft (21.4 m)
- Draught: 46 ft (14 m)
- Depth: 30 ft 2 in (9.2 m)
- Decks: 8
- Installed power: 15,000 shp (11,000 kW)
- Propulsion: Geared steam turbines; Twin propellers
- Speed: 18 kn (33 km/h; 21 mph)
- Capacity: As built; 251 1st class; 1962; 350 one class.

RMS Parthia was the second of two all first class transatlantic passenger cargo liners built for the Cunard Line. She later served on the London to Auckland route for the New Zealand Shipping Company under the name Remuera, and still later as a Pacific cruise ship under the name Aramac. She was scrapped in 1969–70.

== History ==
Originally conceived as cargo ships for the Cunard Line subsidiary – Brocklebank Line, RMS Parthia and her sister RMS Media were completed as transatlantic passenger cargo ships that served the Cunard Line on its Liverpool to New York route from 1948 until 1961. Smaller and somewhat slower than the great express liners, Parthia acquired a reputation for informal elegance and comfort that made her a favourite with many of the travelling public. Among the celebrities who frequently sailed with the ship or her sister ship RMS Media, was the film star Katharine Hepburn. As originally constructed the ship had four passenger decks and included all of the normal amenities expected by her 251 all first class passengers, including stylish lounges, a cocktail bar, library, and spacious staterooms. The limited number of passengers also meant more shipboard space for promenading and other activities which in turn contributed to a more relaxed ambiance. Unfortunately, Parthia and Media were poor sea boats and were eventually fitted with Denny-Brown stabilisers, Media in 1952 and Parthia in 1954, the first transatlantic liners to be so fitted.

With the arrival of the 1960s however, commercial jet planes began to dominate the transatlantic passenger trade and steamship companies increasingly found it difficult to compete. On 16 October 1961 Parthia was withdrawn from service after her final arrival at Liverpool. She was purchased for £705,000 by the P&O group, largely it was thought to prevent her falling into the hands of a competitor as had happened to the Media. P&O allocated the ship to its New Zealand Shipping Company subsidiary which employed the ship, renamed SS Remuera, on the London to Auckland New Zealand route. The ship was refitted at the Alexander Stephen shipyard on the Clyde as a one class ship for 350 passengers, replacing the 33-year-old Rangitiki and Rangitata. Again however, the ship was a financial millstone to her owners, being a steamship in a fleet of motor ships. In 1964 P&O transferred her to another subsidiary, the Eastern and Australian Steamship Company. Renamed Aramac the ship was converted for cruising and served in this capacity until 1969 when she was definitively withdrawn from service and sold for scrap. She arrived in Kaohsiung on 22 November 1969 and was fully scrapped by the end of 1970.
