= SS Yelkenci =

Cargo ship

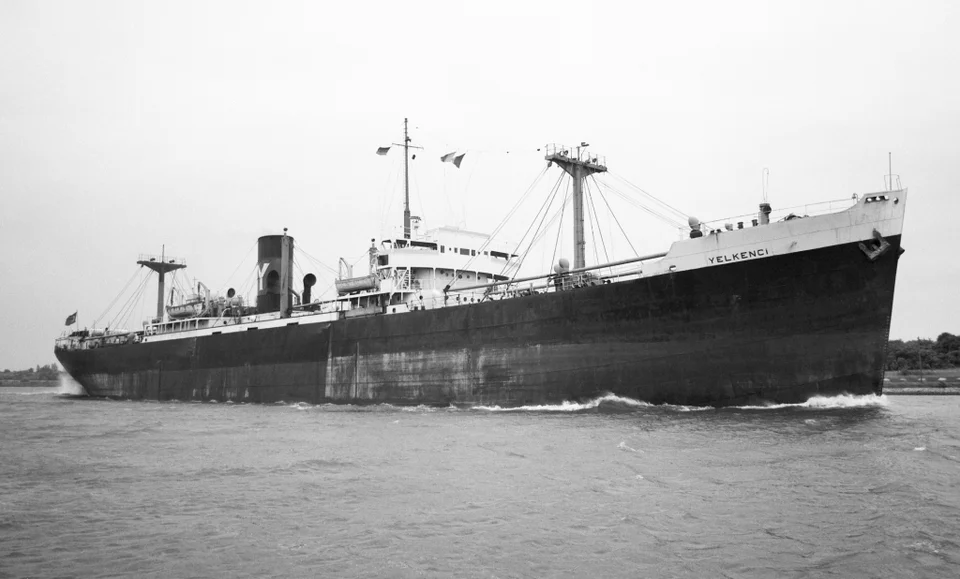
- The cargo ship Yelkenci in the Kiel Canal in 1969

History
- Name: Empire Camp (1943-46); Valacia (1946-51); New York City (1951-55); Loch Morar (1955-59); Yelkenci (1959-71)
- Owner: Ministry of War Transport (1943-46); Cunard-White Star Line (1946-49); Cunard Line (1950-51); Bristol City Line (1951-55); Glasgow United Shipping Co Ltd (1955-59); Lütfi Yelkenci Evlatlari Donmata Iştiraki (1959-71)
- Operator: Blue Star Line (1943-45); Cunard-White Star Line (1945-49); Cunard Line (1950-51); C Hill & Sons Ltd (1951-55); Mackay & MacIntyre Ltd (1955-59); Lütfi Yelkenci Evlatlari Donmata Iştiraki (1959-71)
- Port of registry: (United Kingdom) Sunderland (1943-44); (United Kingdom) Liverpool (1945-51); (United Kingdom) Bristol (1951-55); (United Kingdom) Glasgow (1955-59); (Turkey) Istanbul (1959-71)
- Builder: Short Bros Ltd
- Yard number: 477
- Launched: 17 June 1943
- Completed: November 1943
- Identification: Code Letters BFKR (1943-59); United Kingdom Official Number 169124 (1943-59)
- Fate: Scrapped 1971.

General characteristics
- Tonnage: 7,052 GRT; 4,760 NRT
- Length: 431 ft 0 in (131.37 m)
- Beam: 56 ft 3 in (17.15 m)
- Draught: 26.8 ft 2 in (8.22 m)
- Depth: 35 ft 2 in (10.72 m)
- Installed power: Triple expansion steam engine
- Propulsion: Screw propeller
- Speed: 10.5 knots
- Notes: 260,219 ft^{3} (7,368.6 m^{3}) refrigerated cargo space

Yelkenci was a 7,052 GRT refrigerated cargo ship which was built in 1943 for the Ministry of War Transport (MoWT) as Empire Camp. She was sold in 1946 and renamed Valacia. In 1951, she was sold and renamed New York City. A further sale in 1955 saw her renamed Loch Morar. A final sale to Turkish owners saw her renamed Yelkenci. She served with them until scrapped in 1971.

== Description ==
The ship was built by Short Brothers Ltd, Sunderland. She was launched on 17 June 1943 and completed in November 1943.

A total of 260,219 cubic feet (7,368.6 m^{3}) of refrigerated cargo space was provided in three holds. Refrigeration was provided by two compressors and eight cooling machines made by L Sterne & Co Ltd. The cooling machines used ammonia as a coolant. Insulation was by direct expansion, air, cork and slag wool.

The ship was 431 feet 0 inches (131.37 m) long, with a beam of 56 feet 3 inches (17.15 m) and a depth of 35 feet 2 inches (10.72 m). Her GRT was 7,052 and she had a NRT of 4,760.

She was propelled by a triple expansion steam engine which had cylinders of 24 1/2 inches (62 cm), 39 inches (99 cm) and 70 inches (180 cm) diameter by 48 inches (120 cm) stroke. The engine was built by North East Marine Engine Co (1938) Ltd, Newcastle upon Tyne.

== History ==
Empire Camp was built for the MoWT. She was placed under the management of Blue Star Line Ltd. Her port of registry was Sunderland. The Code Letters BFKR were allocated. Her Official Number was 169124.

Empire Camp was a member of a number of convoys during the Second World War.

HX 306

Convoy HX 306 departed New York on 31 August 1944 and arrived at Liverpool on 17 September. Empire Camp joined the convoy at Halifax, Nova Scotia on 2 September. She was carrying general cargo and a cargo of fish, bound for Manchester.

MKS 75G

Convoy MKS 75G departed Gibraltar on 1 December 1945 bound for Liverpool.

During 1945, management was transferred to Cunard White Star Line Co Ltd. In 1946, Empire Camp was sold to Cunard White Star Line and renamed Valacia. Her port of registry was changed to Liverpool. She was the second Cunard White Star Line ship to carry the name Valacia. In 1950, Valacia was sold to the Bristol City Line and renamed New York City, the fourth ship to bear that name for the company. She was placed under the management of Charles Hill & Sons Ltd, Bristol. In 1955, she was sold to Glasgow United Shipping Co Ltd and renamed Loch Morar and placed under the management of Mackay & MacIntyre Ltd, Glasgow. In 1959, she was sold to Lütfi Yelkenci Evlatlari Donmata Iştiraki, Istanbul and renamed Yelkenci. She served until 1971, arriving at Istanbul on 20 February 1971 for scrapping.
