= List of Cunard Line ships =

The following is a list of ships operated by the Cunard Line.

== Fleet ==
The Cunard fleet, all built for Cunard unless otherwise indicated, consisted of the following ships in order of acquisition:

=== 1840–1850 ===
All ships of this period had wooden hulls and paddle wheels.

Ship	Built	In service for Cunard	Type	GRT	Notes	Image
Unicorn	1836	1840–1845	Express	650	Coastal steamer purchased for Montreal service, sold 1846	
Britannia	1840	1840–1849	Express	1,150	Eastbound record holder, sold to North German Navy 1849	
Acadia	1840	1840–1849	Express	1,150	Sold to North German Navy 1849	
Caledonia	1840	1840–1850	Express	1,138	Sold to Spanish Navy 1850	
Columbia	1841	1840–1843	Express	1,150	Blue Riband, wrecked 1843 without loss of life	
Hibernia	1843	1843–1850	Express	1,422	Eastbound record holder, sold to Spanish Navy 1850	
Cambria	1845	1844–1860	Express	1,423	Blue Riband, sold to Italian owners 1860	
Margaret	1839	1842–1872	Express	750	Bought from G & J Burns. Sold in 1856 for use as a coal hulk.	
America	1848	1848–1866	Express	1,826	Blue Riband, sold 1863 and converted to sail, scrapped 1875	
Niagara	1848	1848–1866	Express	1,824	Sold 1866 and converted to sail, wrecked 1875	
Satellite	1848	1848–1902	Tender	175	Scrapped in 1902	
Europa	1848	1848–1866	Express	1,834	Blue Riband, sold 1867	
Canada	1848	1848–1867	Express	1,831	Eastbound record holder, sold 1866 and converted to sail, scrapped 1883	
Asia	1850	1850–1867	Express	2,250	Blue Riband, sold 1868, scrapped 1883	
Africa	1850	1850–1868	Express	2,250	Sold 1868	

=== 1850–1869 ===
Only Arabia had a wooden hull and only Arabia, Persia, Shamrock, Jackal and Scotia had paddle wheels.

Ship	Built	In service for Cunard	Type	GRT	Notes	Image
Shamrock	1847	1851–1854	Intermediate	714	Sold in 1854	
Arabia	1852	1852–1864	Express	2,400	Sold 1864 and converted to sail, sank 1868	
Andes	1852	1852–1859	Intermediate	1,400	Sold to Spanish Government 1859	
Alps	1852	1852–1859	Intermediate	1,400	Sold to Spanish Government 1859	
Jackal	1852	1852–1893	Tender	180	Scrapped in 1893.	
Karnak	1853	1853–1862	Intermediate	1,116	Wrecked 1862	
Melita	1853	1853–1861	Intermediate	1,254	Sold 1855	
Delta	1853	1854–1899	Intermediate	645	Sold	
Curlew	1853	1853–1856	Intermediate	523	Wrecked 1856	
Jura	1854	1854–1861	Intermediate	2,200	Sold to Allan Line 1860, wrecked off Liverpool 1864	
Etna	1855	1855–1860	Intermediate	2,200	Sold to Inman Line 1860, scrapped 1896	
Emeu	1854	1854-1858	Intermediate	1,538	Purchased from Australasian Pacific Mail in 1855. Chartered in 1857 to European & Australasian Pacific Mail, then sold to P&O in 1858. Troop transport in the Crimean War.	
Persia	1856	1856–1868	Express	3,300	Blue Riband, taken out of service 1868 and scrapped 1872	
Stromboli	1856	1859–1878	Intermediate	734	Wrecked 1878	
Italian	1855	1855–1864	Intermediate	784	Sold 1864	
Lebanon	1854	1855–1859	Intermediate	1,000	Sold 1870	
Palestine	1858	1858–1870	Intermediate	1,000	Sold 1870	
Australasian; Calabria	1857	1859–1876	Intermediate	2,700	Built for other owners, sold 1876, scrapped 1898	
Atlas	1860	1860–1896	Intermediate	2,393	Lengthened and re-engined in 1873, scrapped 1896	
Damascus	1860	1856-1860	Intermediate	1,213	Sold 1881	
Kedar	1860	1860–1897	Intermediate	1,783	Scrapped 1897	
Balbec	1852	1853–1884	Intermediate	1,783	Scrapped 1884	
Marathon	1860	1860–1898	Intermediate	2,403	scrapped 1898	
Morocco	1861	1861–1896	Intermediate	1,855	Scrapped 1896	
China	1862	1862–1880	Intermediate	2,638	Sold to Spanish Government 1880	
British Queen	1849	1852–1898	Intermediate	772	Scrapped 1898	
Scotia	1862	1862–1878	Express	3,850	Blue Riband, Cunard's last paddle steamer, sold 1878 and converted to cable layer. Wrecked 1904	
Hecla	1863	1860–1881	Intermediate	1,785	Sold 1881	
Alpha	1863	1863–1869	Intermediate	653	Sold 1869	
Sidon	1863	1861–1885	Intermediate	1,872	wrecked 1885	
Corscia	1863	1863–1867	Intermediate	1,134	Sold 1868	
Olympus	1863	1860–1881	Intermediate	1,794	Sold 1881	
Tripoli	1863	1863–1872	Intermediate	2,057	Wrecked on Tuskar Rock, Wexford 1872	
Cuba	1864	1864–1876	Express	2,700	Sold 1876 and converted to sail, wrecked 1887	
Aleppo	1865	1865–1909	Intermediate	2,056	Scrapped 1909	
Java	1865	1865–1877	Express	2,700	Sold 1878 to Red Star Line, and renamed Zeeland, lost at sea 1895	
Palmyra	1866	1866–1896	Intermediate	2,044	Scrapped 1896	
Malta	1866	1865–1889	Intermediate	2,132	Wrecked on the Cornish coast 1889	
Russia	1867	1867–1879	Express	2,950	Sold to Red Star Line 1880 and renamed Waesland. Resold and renamed Philadelphia, sank after a collision 1902	
Siberia	1867	1867–1880	Intermediate	2,550	Sold to Spanish owners 1880, renamed Manila, wrecked 1882	
Samaria	1868	1868–1902	Intermediate	2,550	Sold 1892	

=== 1869–1901 ===
Ship	Built	In service for Cunard	Type	GRT	Notes	Image
Batavia	1870	1870–1888	Intermediate	2,550	Traded in for Oregon 1884, scrapped 1924	
Abyssinia	1870	1870–1880	Express	3,250	Sold to Guion Line 1880, destroyed by fire at sea 1891	
Algeria	1870	1870–1881	Express	3,250	Sold to Red Star Line 1881, scrapped 1903	
Parthia	1870	1870–1884	Intermediate	3,150	Traded in for Oregon 1884, scrapped 1956	
Beta	1873	1874–1888	intermediate	1,070	Sold 1889	
Bothnia	1874	1874–1899	Express	4,550	Sold 1896, scrapped 1899	
Saragossa	1874	1874–1909	Intermediate	2,263	Sold 1880, scrapped 1909	
Nantes	1874	1873–1888	Intermediate	1,473	Sank in 1888	
Brest	1874	1874–1879	Intermediate	1,472	Wrecked in 1879	
Cherbourg	1875	1875–1909	intermediate	1,614	Scrapped 1909	
Scythia	1875	1875–1899	Express	4,550	Sold for scrap 1898	
Gallia	1879	1879–1897	Express	4,550	Sold to Beaver Line 1897, scrapped 1900	
Otter	1880	1880–1920	Tender	287	Sold in 1920.	
Catalonia	1881	1881–1901	Intermediate	4,850	Requisitioned for use in the Second Boer War, scrapped 1901	
Cephalonia	1882	1882–1900	Intermediate	5,500	Sold to Russian Navy 1900, sunk Port Arthur 1904 during the Russo-Japanese War	
Pavonia	1882	1882–1900	Intermediate	5,500	Sold and scrapped 1900	
Servia	1881	1881–1902	Express	7,400	First Cunarder with a steel hull and electric lights, scrapped 1902	
Aurania	1883	1883–1905	Express	7,250	Sold and scrapped 1905	
Oregon	1883	1884–1886	Express	7,400	Blue Riband, built for Guion Line, purchased by Cunard 1884, sank 1886 without loss of life	
Umbria	1884	1884–1910	Express	7,700	Blue Riband, with Etruria one of the two last Cunarders to carry sails, scrapped 1910	
Etruria	1884	1885–1909	Express	7,700	Blue Riband, with Umbria one of the two last Cunarders to carry sails, scrapped 1910	
Skirmisher	1884	1884–1945	Tender	612	Scrapped in 1947	
Campania	1893	1893–1914	Express	12,900	Blue Riband, sold to Royal Navy 1914 and converted to aircraft carrier HMS Campania, sank 1918	
Lucania	1893	1893–1909	Express	12,900	Blue Riband, scrapped after fire 1909	
Sylvania	1895	1895–1910	Cargo ship	5,598	Scrapped in 1910	
Carinthia	1895	1895–1900	Cargo ship	5,598	Used as a troop transport in the Boer War. Wrecked off Haiti in 1900	
Pavia	1897	1897–1928	Cargo ship	2,945	scrapped in 1928	
Tyria	1897	1897–1928	Cargo ship	2,936	sold in 1928, scrapped in 1930	
Cypria	1898	1898–1928	Cargo ship	2,396	Scrapped in 1928	
Veria	1899	1899–1915	Cargo ship	3,229	sunk by a torpedo 1915	
Ultonia	1899	1898–1917	Intermediate	10,400	Sunk by SM U-53 1917	
Ivernia	1900	1900–1917	Intermediate	14,250	Sunk by SM UB-47 1917	
Saxonia	1900	1900–1925	Intermediate	14,250	Scrapped 1925	

=== 1901–1918 ===
Ship	Built	In service for Cunard	Type	GRT	Notes	Image
Brescia	1903	1903–1931	Cargo ship	3,225	Scrapped in 1931.	
Carpathia	1903	1903–1918	Intermediate	13,600	Rescued survivors from Titanic, later sunk by SM U-55 1918.	
Slavonia	1903	1903–1909	Intermediate	10,606	Wrecked 1909.	
Pannonia	1903	1903–1914	Intermediate	9,851	Chartered by Anchor Line 1914 for 4 trips, scrapped 1922.	
Caronia	1905	1905–1932	Intermediate	19,650	Scrapped 1932.	
Carmania	1905	1905–1932	Intermediate	19,650	Scrapped 1932.	
Lusitania	1907	1907–1915	Express	31,550	Blue Riband, sunk by U-20 1915.	
Mauretania	1907	1907–1934	Express	31,938	Blue Riband, scrapped 1935.	
Lycia	1896	1909–1917	Cargo ship	2,715	Captured by SM UC-65 and sunk by bombs 1917	
Phrygia	1900	1909–1928	Cargo ship	3,352	Sold in 1928 and scrapped in 1933.	
Thracia	1895	1909–1917	Cargo ship	2,891	Sunk by SM UC-69 1917	
Franconia	1911	1911–1916	Intermediate	18,100	Sunk by SM UB-47 1916	
Albania	1900	1911–1912	Intermediate	7,650	Built for Thompson Line, purchased by Cunard 1911, sold to Bank Line 1912, scrapped 1930	
Ausonia	1909	1911–1918	Intermediate	7,907	Ex-Tortona built for Thompson Line, purchased by Cunard 1911, sunk by SM U-62 30 May 1918.	
Ascania	1911	1911–1918	Intermediate	9,100	Wrecked 1918	
Caria	1900	1911–1915	Cargo ship	3,023	Sunk by U boat in 1915	
Laconia	1912	1912–1917	Intermediate	18,100	Sunk by SM U-50 1917	
Andania	1913	1913–1918	Intermediate	13,400	Sunk by SM U-46 1918	
Alaunia	1913	1913–1916	Intermediate	13,400	Sunk by mine 1916	
Aquitania	1914	1914–1950	Express	45,647	Served in both world wars, longest serving Cunard liner until Scythia in 1956, scrapped 1950	
Transylvania	1914	1914–1917	Intermediate	14,348	Sunk by U-63 in 1917	
Orduna	1914	1914–1921	Intermediate	15,700	Built for PSN Co, acquired by Cunard 1914, returned to PSN 1921, scrapped 1951	
Volodia	1913	1915–1917	Cargo ship	5,689	Sunk SM U-93 1917	
Vandalia	1912	1915–1918	Cargo ship	7,334	Sunk by U boat in 1918	
Vinovia	1906	1915–1917	Cargo ship	7,046	Sunk by U boat 1917	
Valeria	1913	1915-1918	Cargo ship	5.865	caught fire in 1918 no casualties but the ship was a total loss.	
Aurania	1916	1916–1918	Intermediate	13,400	Sunk by SM UB-67 in 1918	
Valacia	1916	1916–1931	Cargo ship	6,526	Sold in 1931 Later sunk by U-103 in 1941.	
Royal George	1907	1916–1920	Intermediate	11,142	Ex Heliopolis Served on the Liverpool to New York route. Scrapped 1922.	
Justicia	1917	Never operated	Intermediate	32,120	Acquired from the Holland America Line but never operated for Cunard due to a crew shortage, and was handed over to the White Star Line.	
Feltria	1891	1916–1917	Intermediate	2,254	Sunk by UC-48 in 1917.	
Flavia	1902	1916–1918	Intermediate	9,285	Sunk by U-107 In 1918.	
Folia	1907	1916–1917	Intermediate	6,560	Sunk by U-53 in 1917.	
Dwinsk	1897	1917-1918	Intermediate	8,139	Acquired from the Holland America Line, Sunk by SM U-151 in 1918.	

=== 1918–1934 ===
Ship	Built	In service for Cunard	Type	GRT	Notes	Image
Virgilia	1918	1919–1925	Cargo ship	5,697	Sold in 1925.	
Vindelia	1918	1919-1919	Cargo ship	4,430	Sold to Anchor Line 1919.	
Verentia	1918	1919-1919	Cargo ship	4,430	Sold to Anchor Line 1919.	
Vitellia	1918	1919–1926	Cargo ship	5,185	Sold 1926.	
Vardulia	1917	1919–1926	Cargo ship	5,691	Sold in 1929 later sunk in 1935.	
Verbania	1918	1919–1926	Cargo ship	5,021	Sold 1926.	
Vennonia	1918	1919–1923	Cargo ship	4,430	Sold 1923.	
Vasconia	1918	1919–1927	Cargo ship	5,680	Sold to Japan 1927.	
Venusia	1918	1919–1926	Cargo ship	5,223	Sold 1923.	
Vauban	1912	1919–1922	Intermediate	10,660	Chartered from Lamport & Holt Line for six voyages, scrapped 1932.	
Vestris	1912	1919–1922	Intermediate	10,494	Chartered from Lamport & Holt Line for six voyages, Wrecked in 1928.	
Vasari	1908	1919–1921	Intermediate	8,401	Chartered from Lamport & Holt Line for seven voyages	
Vellavia	1918	1919–1925	Cargo ship	5,272	Sold in 1925.	
Albania	1920	1920–1930	Intermediate	12,750	Sold to Libera Triestina 1930 and renamed California, sunk by Fleet Air Arm Swordfish	
Satellite	1896	1920–1924	Tender	333	Scrapped in 1924.	
Berengaria	1913	1921–1938	Express	52,117	Built by Hapag as Imperator, purchased by Cunard 1921, sold for scrap 1938	
Scythia	1921	1921–1958	Intermediate	19,700	Longest serving liner until QE2 in 2005, scrapped 1958	
Cameronia	1921	1921–1924	Intermediate	16,365	Chartered from the Anchor Line	
Emperor Of India	1914	1921-1921	Intermediate	11,430	Chartered from P&O for one voyage.	
Empress Of India	1907	1921-1921	Intermediate	16,992	Chartered from Canadian and Pacific line for two voyages.	
Andania	1921	1921–1940	Intermediate	13,900	Sunk by UA 1940.	
Samaria	1922	1922–1955	Intermediate	19,700	Scrapped 1955	
Vandyck	1921	1922–1922	Intermediate	13,234	Chartered from Lamport Holt line for 1 voyage	
Laconia	1922	1922–1942	Intermediate	19,700	Sunk by U-156 1942	
Saturnia	1910	1922–1924	Cargo liner	8,611	Chartered from Donaldson Line	
Antonia	1922	1922–1942	Intermediate	13,900	Sold to Admiralty 1942, scrapped 1948	
Ausonia	1922	1922–1942	Intermediate	13,900	Sold to Admiralty 1942, scrapped 1965	
Lancastria	1922	1922–1940	Intermediate	16,250	Built as Tyrrhenia, sunk by bombing 1940	
Athenia	1923	1923–1935	Intermediate	13,465	Transferred to Anchor Donaldson, sunk by U-30 1939	
Lotharingia	1923	1923–1933	Tender	1,256	Sold in 1933	
Alsatia	1923	1923–1933	Tender	1,310	Sold in 1933	
Franconia	1923	1923–1956	Intermediate	20,200	Scrapped 1956	
Aurania	1924	1924–1942	Intermediate	14,000	Sold to Admiralty 1942, scrapped 1961	
Cassandra	1924	1924–1929	Cargo liner	8,135	Chartered from Donaldson Line, sold 1929, scrapped 1934	
Carinthia	1925	1925–1940	Ocean liner	20,200	Sunk by U-46 1940	
Letitia	1925	1925–1935	Intermediate	13,475	Transferred to Anchor Donaldson 1935	
Ascania	1925	1925–1956	Intermediate	14,000	Scrapped 1956	
Alaunia	1925	1925–1944	Intermediate	14,000	Sold to Admiralty 1944, scrapped 1957.	
Tuscania	1921	1926–1931	Intermediate	16,991	Chartered from the Anchor Line.	
Bantria	1928	1928-1954	Cargo ship	2,402	Sold to Costa Line 1954 and renamed Giorgina Celli.	
Bactria	1928	1928–1954	Cargo ship	2,407	Sold to Costa Rica 1954 and renamed Theo.	
Bothnia	1928	1928–1955	Cargo ship	2,402	Sold to Panama 1955 and renamed Emily.	
Bosnia	1928	1928–1939	Cargo ship	2,402	Sunk by U-47 in 1939.	

=== 1934–1949 ===
See also: White Star Line's Olympic, Homeric, Majestic, Doric, and Laurentic.

Ship	Built	In service for Cunard	Type	GRT	Notes	Image
Queen Mary	1936	1936–1967	Express	80,774 (1936); 81,237 (1947)	WWII troopship 1940–1945; Blue Riband, sold 1967, now a stationary hotel ship	
Mauretania	1939	1939–1965	Express	35,738	WWII troopship 1940–1945; scrapped by 1966	
Queen Elizabeth	1940	1946–1968	Express	83,673	WWII troopship 1940–1945, sold to The Queen Corporation in 1968, renamed Elizabeth; auctioned off to Tung Chao Yung in 1970, refitted as a floating university, renamed Seawise University, destroyed by fire in 1972; partially scrapped 1974–1975	
Valacia	1943	1946–1950	Cargo ship	7,052	Sold to Bristol city line 1950	
Vasconia	1944	1946–1950	Cargo ship	7,058	Sold to Blue star line 1950	
Media	1947	1947–1961	Passenger-cargo liner	13,350	Sold to Cogedar Line 1961, refitted as an ocean liner, renamed Flavia; sold to Virtue Shipping Company in 1969, renamed Flavian; sold to Panama, renamed Lavia in 1982, caught fire and sank in 1989 in Hong Kong Harbour during refitting and was scrapped afterwards in Taiwan	
Asia	1947	1947–1963	Cargo ship	8,723	Sold to Taiwan 1963 and renamed Shirley	
Brescia	1945	1947–1966	Cargo ship	3,834	Ex Hickory Isle Purchased from MOWT 1947 sold to Panama 1966 and renamed Timber One	
Parthia	1947	1947–1961	Passenger-cargo liner	13,350	Sold to P&O 1961, renamed Remuera; transferred to P&O's Eastern and Australian Steamship Company in 1964, refitted as a cruise ship, renamed Aramac; scrapped in Taiwan by 1970	
Vardulia	1944	1947-1968	Cargo ship	7,176	Scrapped in 1968	
Britannic	1930	1949–1960	Intermediate	26,943 (1930) 27,666 (1947)	Built for White Star Line, scrapped 1960	
Georgic	1931	1949–1956	Intermediate	27,759	Built for White Star Line, scrapped 1956	
Caronia	1949	1949–1968	Cruise ship	34,183	Sold to Star Shipping 1968, renamed Columbia; renamed Caribia in 1969; wrecked 1974 at Apra Harbor, Guam and broke up while being towed to Taiwan to be scrapped	

=== 1949–1968 ===
Ship	Built	In service for Cunard	Type	GRT	Notes	Image
Assyria	1950	1950–1963	Cargo ship	8663	Sold to Greece as Laertis	
Alsatia	1948	1951–1963	Cargo ship	7226	1951 ex Silverplane purchased from Silver Line, 1963 sold to Taiwan, renamed Union Freedom	
Andria	1948	1951–1963	Cargo ship	7228	1951 ex Silverbriar purchased from Silver Line, 1963 sold to Taiwan, renamed Union Faith. Sank on 6 April 1969 after a collision and fire.	
Pavia	1953	1953–1965	Cargo ship	3,411	Sold to Greece as Toula N 1965	
Lycia	1954	1954–1965	Cargo ship	3,543	Served on Great Lakes trade in 1964. Sold to Greece a year later and renamed Flora N	
Saxonia Carmania	1954	1954–1962; 1962–1973	Canadian service Cruise ship	21,637; 21,370	Refitted as cruise ship in 1962, renamed Carmania; sold to the Black Sea Shipping Company, Soviet Union 1973, renamed Leonid Sobinov, scrapped 1999	
Phrygia	1955	1955–1965	Cargo ship	3,534	Served on Cunard Great Lakes route in 1964. Sold to Panama a year later and renamed Dimitris N	
Ivernia; Franconia	1955	1955–1963; 1963–1973	Canadian service Cruise ship	21,800	Refitted as cruise ship in 1963, renamed Franconia; sold to the Far Eastern Shipping Company, Soviet Union 1973, renamed Fedor Shalypin; transferred to the Black Sea Shipping Company in 1980; transferred to the Odessa Cruise Company in 1992; scrapped 2004	
Carinthia	1956	1956–1968	Canadian service	21,800	Sold to Sitmar Line 1968, refitted as a full-time cruise ship, renamed Fairsea; transferred to Princess Cruises, renamed Fair Princess in 1988 when Sitmar was sold to P&O; transferred to P&O Cruises Australia in 1996; sold to China Sea Cruises in 2000, renamed China Sea Discovery; scrapped 2005 or 2006	
Sylvania	1957	1957–1968	Canadian service	21,800	Sold to Sitmar Line 1968, renamed Fairwind, renamed Sitmar Fairland in 1988; transferred to Princess Cruises, renamed Dawn Princess; sold to V-Ships in 1993, renamed Albatros; sold to the Alang, India scrapyard, renamed Genoa and scrapped 2004	
Andania	1959	1959–1969	Cargo liner	7,004	Sold to Brocklebank Line in 1969	
Alaunia	1960	1960–1969	Cargo liner	7,004	Sold to Brocklebank Line in 1969	
Arabia	1955	1967–1969	Cargo liner	3,803	Ex-Castilian chartered from Ellerman Lines	
Nordia	1961	1961–1963	Cargo ship	4,560	sold 1963	
Media	1963	1963–1971	Cargo ship	5,586	Sold 1971 to Stateships, Western Australia, renamed Beroona	
Parthia	1963	1963–1971	Cargo ship	5,586	Sold 1971 to Stateships, Western Australia, renamed Wambiri	
Saxonia	1963	1963–1970	Cargo ship	5,586	Sold to Brocklabank Line renamed Maharonda	
Sarmania	1964	1964–1969	Cargo ship	5,837	Sold 1969 to T & J. Harrison, Liverpool renamed Scholar	
Scythia	1964	1964–1969	Cargo ship	5,837	Sold 1969 to T & J. Harrison, Liverpool renamed Merchant	
Ivernia	1964	1964–1970	Cargo ship	5,586	Sold 1970 to Brocklebank Line renamed Manipur	
Scotia	1966	1966–1970	Cargo ship	5,837	Sold 1970 to Singapore renamed Neptune Amber	

=== 1968–1999 ===
Ship	Built	In service for Cunard	Type	GRT/GT	Notes	Image
Queen Elizabeth 2	1969	1969–2008	Ocean Liner	70,327	Sold 2008, Last ocean liner built for Cunard until the QM2, longest serving Cunarder in history; operating as a floating hotel in Dubai since April 2018	
Atlantic Causeway	1969	1970–1986	Container ship	14,950	Scrapped in 1986	
Atlantic Conveyor	1970	1970–1982	Container ship	14,946	Sunk in Falklands War 1982	
Cunard Adventurer	1971	1971–1977	Cruise ship	14,150	Sold to Norwegian Cruise Line 1977, renamed Sunward II, renamed Triton in 1991; auctioned in 2004 to Louis Cruises and renamed Coral; sold to a Turkish scrapping company and then to the Alang, India shipbreaking yard and scrapped in 2014	
Cunard Campaigner	1971	1971–1974	Bulk carrier	15,498	Sold to the Great Eastern Shipping Co in 1974 and renamed Jag Shakti. Scrapped at Alang, India in 1997	
Cunard Caravel	1971	1971–1974	Bulk carrier	15,498	Sold to the Great Eastern Shipping Co in 1974 and renamed Jag Shanti. Scrapped at Alang, India in 1997	
Cunard Carronade	1971	1971–1978	Bulk carrier	15,498	Sold to Olympic Maritime in 1978. and renamed Olympic History.	
Cunard Calamanda	1972	1972–1978	Bulk carrier	15,498	Sold in 1978 and renamed Ionian Carrier.	
Cunard Ambassador	1972	1972–1974	Cruise ship	14,150	Sold after fire 1974 to C. Clausen, refitted as sheep carrier Linda Clausen; sold to Lembu Shipping Corporation and renamed Procyon, caught fire a second time in 1981 in Singapore but was repaired; sold to Qatar Transport and Marine Services; sold to Taiwanese ship breakers and scrapped in 1984 following a 1983 fire	
Cunard Carrier	1973	1973–	Bulk carrier	15,498	Sold to Silverdale Ltd and renamed Aeneas.	
Cunard Cavalier	1973	1973–1978	Bulk carrier	15,498	Sold to Olympic Maritime in 1978 and renamed Olympic Harmony. Wrecked at Port Muhammad in 1990 and scrapped at Alang in 1992.	
Cunard Chietain	1973	1973–	Bulk carrier	15,498	Sold to Superblue and renamed Chieftain. Resold to Great City Navigation in 1981 and renamed Great City.	
Cunard Countess	1975	1976–1996	Cruise ship	17,500	Sold to Awani Cruise Line 1996, renamed Awani Dream II; transferred to Royal Olympic Cruises 1998, renamed Olympic Countess; sold to Majestic International Cruises 2004, renamed Ocean Countess, chartered to Louis Cruise Lines as Ruby during 2007; retired in 2012; caught fire in 2013 at Chalkis, Greece while laid up; sold to a Turkish scrapyard and scrapped in 2014	
Cunard Princess	1975	1977–1995	Cruise ship	17,500	Charted to StarLauro Cruises in 1995; sold to MSC Cruises in 1995, renamed Rhapsody; sold to Mano Maritime in 2009 and renamed Golden Iris. Scrapped July 2022 at Aliağa, Turkey.	
Sarmania	1973	1976–1986	Reefer	8,557	Ex-Chrysantema, 1976 purchased from Paravon Shipping, Glasgow, 1986 sold to Greece renamed Capricorn. Scrapped at Alang, India in 1997	
Alastia	1973	1976–1981	Reefer	7,722	1972 Ex- Edinburgh Clipper, 1976 purchased from Maritime Fruit Carriers Corp., renamed Alsatia, 1981 sold to Restis Group renamed America Freezer	
Andania	1972	1976–1981	Reefer	7,689	Ex-Glasgow Clipper, 1976 purchased from Souvertur Shipping, Glasgow renamed Andania, 1981 sold to Restis Group renamed Europa Freezer. Scrapped at Alang, India in 1995	
Saxonia	1973	1976–1986	Reefer	8,547	Ex-Gladiola, 1976 purchased from Adelaide Shipping, Glasgow, 1986 sold to Tondo Shipping Corp renamed Carina	
Andria	1972	1976–1981	Reefer	7,722	Ex- Teesside Clipper, 1976 purchased from Maritime Island Fruit Reefers Ltd, renamed Andria, 1981 sold to Restis Group renamed Australia Freezer	
Carmania	1972	1976–1986	Reefer	7,323	Ex- Orange, 1976 purchased from Chichester Shipping, Glasgow renamed Carmania, 1986 sold to Greece renamed Perseus	
Scythia	1972	1976–1986	Reefer	8,557	Ex- Iris Queen, 1976 purchased from Adelaide Shipping, Glasgow, 1986 sold to Greece renamed Centaurus. Destroyed by fire in 1989	
England	1964	1982–1986	Ferry	8,116	1982 purchased from DFDS, 1986 left for Jeddah as accommodation ship renamed America XIII. Sank in the Red Sea en route to Alang, India for scrapping in 1999	
Sagafjord	1965	1983–1997	Ocean Liner	24,500	Built for Norwegian America Line; chartered to Transocean Tours as Gripsholm during 1996–1997; sold to Saga Cruises 1997 and renamed Saga Rose; retired in 2009, sold to a Chinese ship recycling yard and scrapped 2011–2012	
Vistafjord; Caronia	1973	1983–1999; 1999–2004	Cruise ship	24,300	built for Norwegian America Line; operated under Norwegian America Line from 1973 to 1983, and under Cunard from 1983 to 2004, renamed Caronia in 1999; sold to Saga Cruises 2004 and renamed Saga Ruby; retired in 2014, sold to Millennium View Ltd. in 2014, renamed Oasia and planned to be refitted as a floating hotel ship in Myanmar, but this never happened; towed to the Alang shipbreaking yard and scrapped in 2017	
Atlantic Star	1967	1983–1987	Container ship	15,055	Transferred from Holland America Line	
Atlantic Conveyor	1985	1985–1996	Container ship	58,438	Transferred to Atlantic Container Line then sold for scrap 2017 to Alang, India	
Sea Goddess I	1984	1986–1998	Cruise ship	4,333	Built for Sea Goddess Cruises; transferred to Cunard in 1986; transferred to Seabourn Cruise Line 1998 and renamed Seabourn Goddess I; sold to SeaDream Yacht Club in 2001 and renamed SeaDream I	
Sea Goddess II	1985	1986–1998	Cruise ship	4,333	Built for Sea Goddess Cruises, transferred to Cunard in 1986; transferred to Seabourn Cruise Line 1998 and renamed Seabourn Goddess II; sold to SeaDream Yacht Club in 2001 and renamed SeaDream II	
Cunard Crown Monarch	1990	1993–1994	Cruise ship	15,271	Built for Crown Cruise Line, transferred to Crown Cruise Line 1994	
Cunard Crown Jewel	1992	1993–1995	Cruise ship	19,089	Built for Crown Cruise Line, transferred to Star Cruises 1995	
Cunard Crown Dynasty	1993	1993–1997	Cruise ship	19,089	Built for Crown Cruise Line, transferred to Majesty Cruise Line 1997	
Royal Viking Sun	1988	1994–1999	Cruise ship	37,850	Built for Royal Viking Line, transferred to Seabourn Cruise Line 1999	

=== 1999–Present ===
Ship	Built	In service	Type	Gross tonnage	Flag	Notes	Image
Queen Mary 2	2003	2004–present	Ocean liner	149,215 GT	Bermuda	In service	
Queen Victoria	2007	2007–present	Cruise ship	90,049 GT	Bermuda	In service	
Queen Elizabeth	2010	2010–present	Cruise ship	90,901 GT	Bermuda	In service	
Queen Anne	2024	2024–present	Cruise ship	113,300 GT	Bermuda	In service	

== See also ==
- List of White Star Line ships
