= SS Albania =

SS Albania is the name of the following ships:

- RMS Albania, launched in 1900, scrapped in 1930
- SS Albania (1903), sunk by a mine on 23 October 1939
- SS Albania (1920), torpedoed and sunk 11 August 1941

== See also ==
- Albania (disambiguation)
