= Baxtergate =

Baxtergate may refer to

- Baxter Gate, a street in Doncaster, South Yorkshire
- Baxtergate, a street in Grimsby, North East Lincolnshire
- Baxtergate, a street Walkley, South Yorkshire
- Baxtergate, a street Whitby, North Yorkshire
- SS Baxtergate, a British cargo ship in service 1951-60
