= RMS Aurania (1882) =

British transatlantic ocean liner

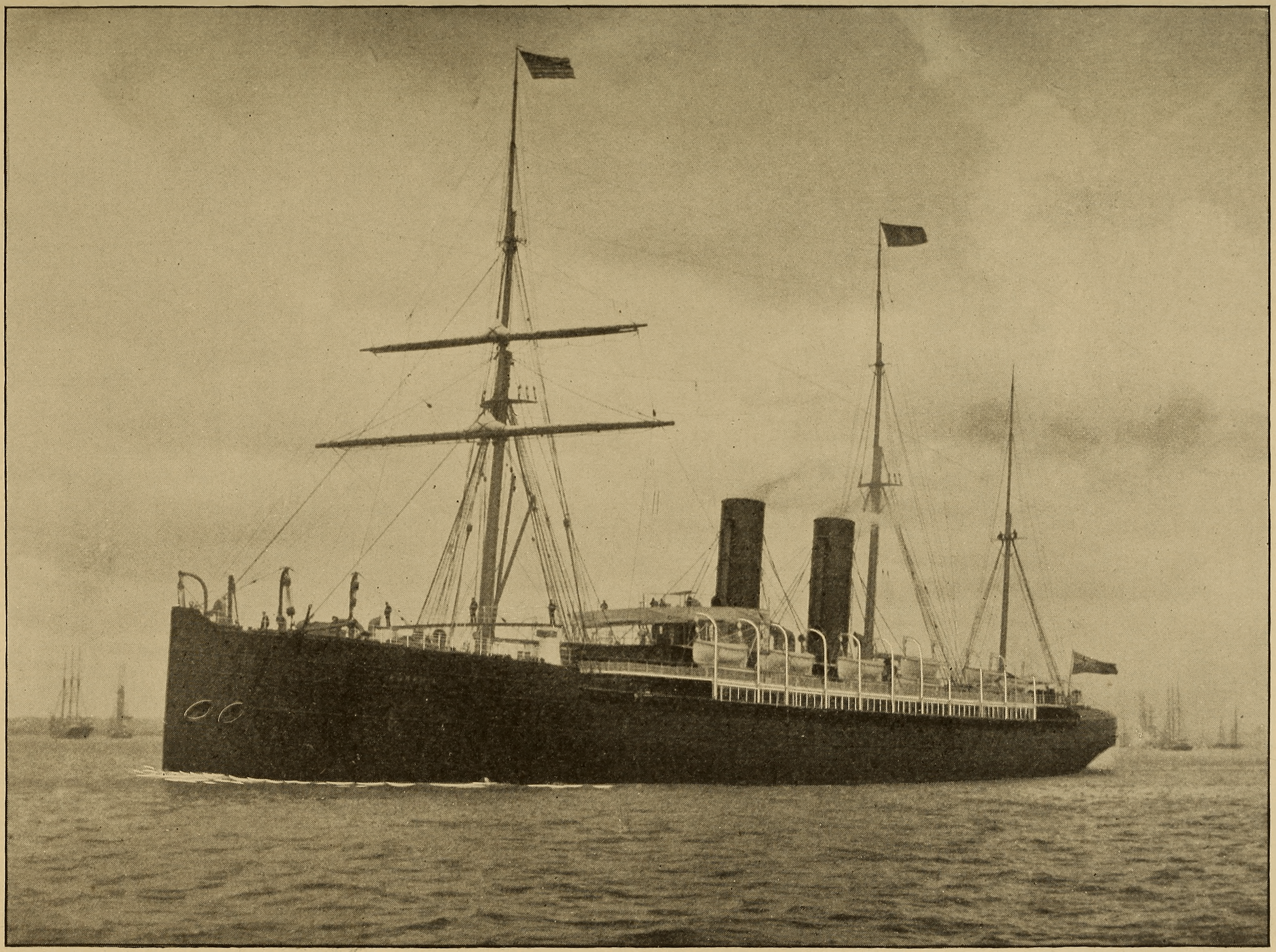
- RMS Aurania on page 471 in Cassier's Magazine of September 1895

History

United Kingdom
- Name: (United Kingdom) RMS Aurania
- Owner: Cunard Line
- Port of registry: Liverpool, United Kingdom
- Route: Liverpool-Queenstown-New York
- Ordered: 1881
- Builder: J. & G. Thomson & Co.
- Yard number: 187
- Laid down: 1881
- Launched: 26 December 1882
- Completed: April 1883
- Maiden voyage: 23 June 1883
- Out of service: 1905
- Identification: HRGW
- Fate: Scrapped 1905

General characteristics
- Type: Ocean Liner
- Tonnage: 7,269 GRT
- Length: 147.8 metres (484 ft 11 in)
- Beam: 17.4 metres (57 ft 1 in)
- Depth: 11.3 metres (37 ft 1 in)
- Installed power: Compound engine with 3 inverted cylinders
- Propulsion: Screw propeller
- Sail plan: 3 masts
- Speed: 18.5 knots
- Capacity: 363 1st class, 700 3rd class
- Notes: First of 3 Auranias of Cunard Line

RMS Aurania was a British Ocean Liner that was scrapped at Genoa, Italy after 22 years of service (1883-1905).

== Construction ==
Aurania was constructed in 1881 at the J. & G. Thomson & Co. shipyard in Glasgow, United Kingdom for Cunard Line. She was completed in 1883 and made her first voyage on 23 June 1883 from Liverpool to Queenstown to New York. She was named Aurania and served from 1883 to 1905. The ship was 143.3 metres (470 ft 2 in) long, with a beam of 17.4 metres (57 ft 1 in) and a depth of 11.3 metres (37 ft 1 in). The ship was assessed at 7,269 GRT. She had a Compound engine with 3 inverted cylinders driving a single screw propeller and 3 Masts. The engine was rated at 1500 nhp. She had a steel hull, and eleven watertight compartments of which she could float with two of these flooded.

In her career Aurania was to act as a consort ship to the SS Servia, built 2 years prior. Unlike the Servia, the Aurania had a more experimental design. Typically, liners would be 10 times longer than they were broad, but Aurania was only 8 times longer. This enhanced her stability greatly, along with cargo capacity and passenger accommodations. She had a registered length of 470 ft (143.25m), an overall length of 485 ft (147.82m), a breadth of 57 ft (17.4m) and a depth of 37 ft (11.3m). She was powered by 8 boilers, and a 3 cylinder compound steam engine. On sea trials in April 1883, the ship proved a great success with a speed of 18.5 knots being easily obtained, above the satisfactory 16 knots desired. Aurania was registered at Liverpool on June 16, 1883.

== Career ==
During her maiden voyage on 23 June 1883 she left Liverpool for Queenstown and finally for New York, but halfway through the Atlantic her engine failed due to overheating, and a broken connecting rod shot through her engine skylight, causing panic among passengers. The voyage was completed under sail and she arrived in New York on 4 July 1883 under sail and tow with disabled engines. She departed New York in August 1883 for the Clyde, running on her low pressure cylinder with a speed of 11 knots. After repairs were completed, she resumed service on April 12, 1884.

In September 1885, the White Star Liner Republic collided with Aurania off Sandy Hook. Republic was disabled and brought back to New York while Aurania continued her voyage.

In October 1899 Aurania was used as a Transport Ship during the Boer war, she returned to civil service on April 14, 1903. In 1903 her sailing route was changed and she sailed from the Mediterranean to New York. She served on this route for only three round trips, and resumed the Liverpool-New York run in February 1904.

== The final days ==
RMS Aurania was sold to L. Pittaluga's breakers yard for scrapping in February 1905. The redundant ship arrived at Genoa, Italy for breaking March 13, 1905.
