= SS Ascania =

British passenger ship (1911–1918)

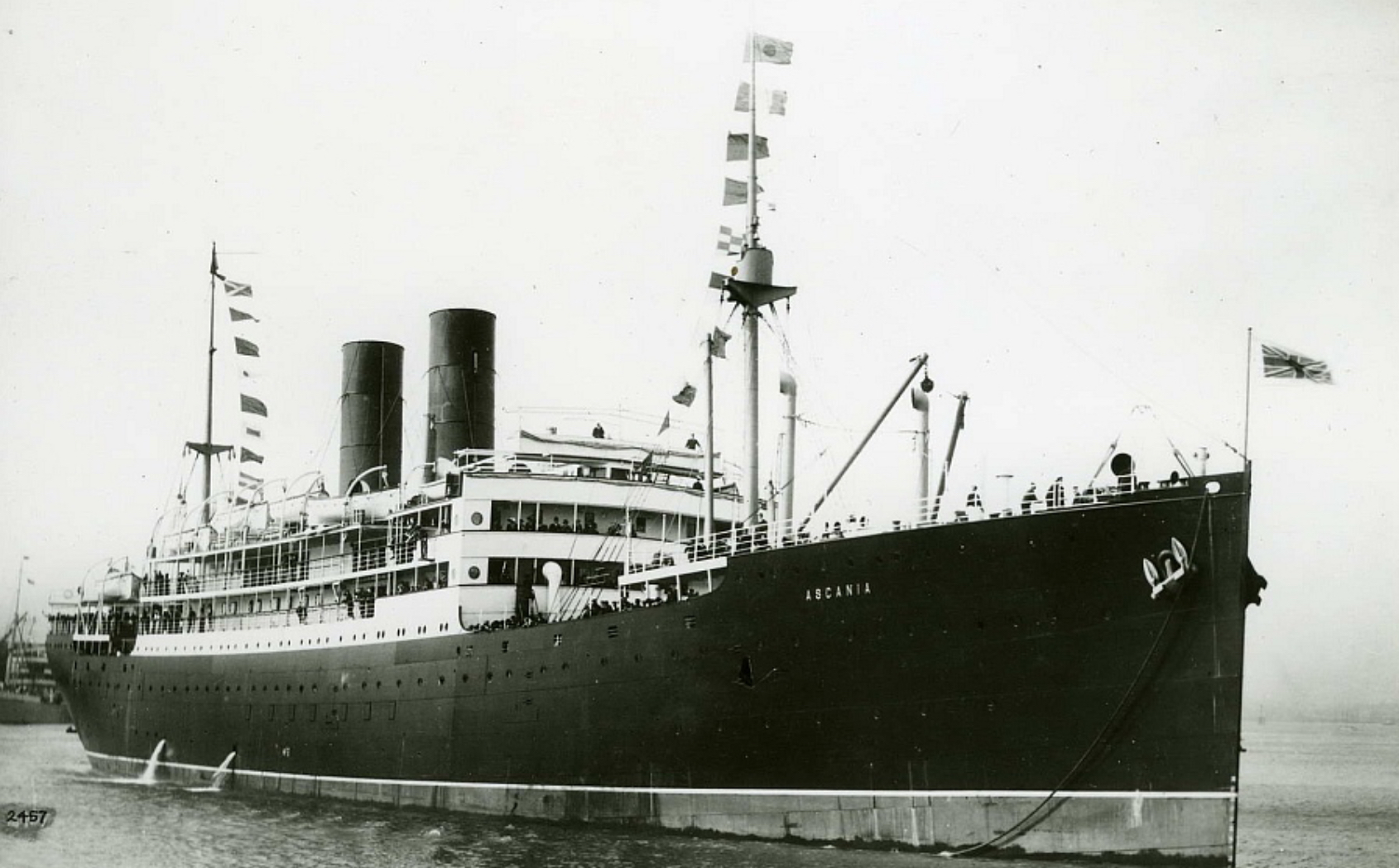
- SS Ascania on 4 December 1912

History

United Kingdom
- Name: (United Kingdom) Gerona (During construction); (United Kingdom) Ascania (1911–1918)
- Owner: Thomson Line (During construction); Cunard Line (1911–1918)
- Port of registry: Liverpool, United Kingdom
- Route: London – Southampton – Quebec – Montreal
- Builder: Swan Hunter
- Cost: £149,224
- Yard number: 869
- Laid down: 1911
- Launched: 4 March 1911
- Completed: 23 May 1911
- Maiden voyage: 23 May 1911
- In service: 23 May 1911
- Out of service: 13 June 1918
- Identification: Official number: 131342
- Fate: Ran aground on 13 June 1918
- Notes: Call letters: HSQV

General characteristics
- Type: Ocean liner
- Tonnage: 9,121 GRT
- Length: 142.04 m (466 ft 0 in)
- Beam: 17.1 m (56 ft 1 in)
- Depth: 8.96 m (29 ft 5 in)
- Installed power: 2 triple expansion steam engines
- Propulsion: 2 screw propellers
- Sail plan: 2 masts and 2 funnels
- Speed: 13 knots (24 km/h; 15 mph)
- Capacity: 200 second class and 1,500 steerage passengers
- Notes: Captain Horace Mills Benison

SS Ascania was a British ocean liner of the Cunard Line that ran aground 20 nautical miles (37 km) east of Cape Ray, Newfoundland in the Breton Strait on 13 June 1918, while she was travelling from Liverpool, United Kingdom to Montreal, Canada while in ballast.

== Construction ==
Ascania was originally built in 1911 for the Thomson Line and was to be named Gerona, before the Cunard Line purchased her for £149,224 and renamed her Ascania. Strong winds prevented the scheduled launch of the ship on 1 March 1911 and she was instead launched on 4 March 1911 at the Swan Hunter shipyard in Wallsend, United Kingdom. The ship was completed on 23 May 1911. The ship was 142.04 metres (466 ft 0 in) long, with a beam of 17.1 metres (56 ft 1 in) and a depth of 8.96 metres (29 ft 5 in). The ship was assessed at 9,121 gross register tons (GRT) and had two triple expansion steam engines driving two screw propellers producing 976 horsepower (728 kW). The ship could reach a maximum speed of 13 knots (24 km/h; 15 mph) and possessed two masts and two funnels. As built, she had the capacity to carry 200 second class passengers and 1,500 steerage passengers.

== Career and loss ==
Ascania departed on her maiden voyage from London to Montreal via Southampton and Quebec on 23 May 1911. She sailed this route every fortnight throughout her career safe for the winter months when the St. Lawrence River would be closed and the ship would be rerouted to Portland, Maine. At the outbreak of the First World War in 1914, Ascania continued her purpose as an ocean liner but would carry Canadian troops headed for the Western Front in France instead of steerage passengers on her eastbound return voyages. The ship also saw service in the Mediterranean during the Gallipoli campaign in 1915. After the entry of the United States into the war, Ascania picked up a detachment of the US 119th Infantry from Hoboken in May 1918. The ship would then first sail to Halifax, Nova Scotia before joining a convoy to cross the Atlantic Ocean to Liverpool. The convoy was attacked by a German U-boat during the night of 26 May, but Ascania was not hit in the altercation and subsequently arrived safely in England on 27 May 1918.

Ascania was sailing from Liverpool, United Kingdom to Montreal, Canada while in ballast under the command of Captain Horace Mills Benison while carrying 200 passengers and crew, when it encountered heavy seas as she was nearing the Canadian coast and ran aground 20 nautical miles (37 km) east of Cape Ray, Newfoundland in the Breton Strait on 13 June 1918. All people on board were rescued from the stricken vessel by a patrol boat and subsequent attempts to refloat the ship failed as she had broken her keel and started to get torn apart by the pounding waves. The ship was declared a total loss and abandoned as it broke apart further and sank in the shallow waters.

== Wreck ==
The wreck of Ascania lies in 9.8 feet (3 m) to 49 feet (15 m) of water. The bow section lies the shallowest towards the coast with the stern laying in deeper water. The wreck is badly broken up and scattered due to exposure to the strong Atlantic swells, but the two propeller shafts remain intact despite the removal of both propellers, yet two propeller blades can still be found on the seabed. Her steering quadrant and part of the rudder are also still intact on the wreck. Next to the wreck, parts of the mast and a section of the crow's nest can be found alongside two boilers and an anchor with 9.8 feet (3 m) worth of chain still attached. The ship's other anchor was salvaged and remained in the nearby town of Petites for many years.
