= Thos. W. Ward =

British business (1878–1982)

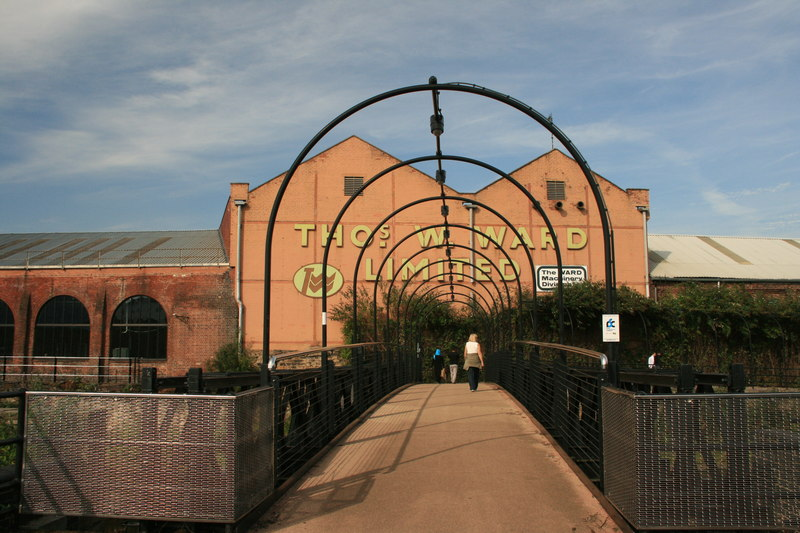
Bailey Bridge, erected in 2006 at the rear of Albion Works, Sheffield

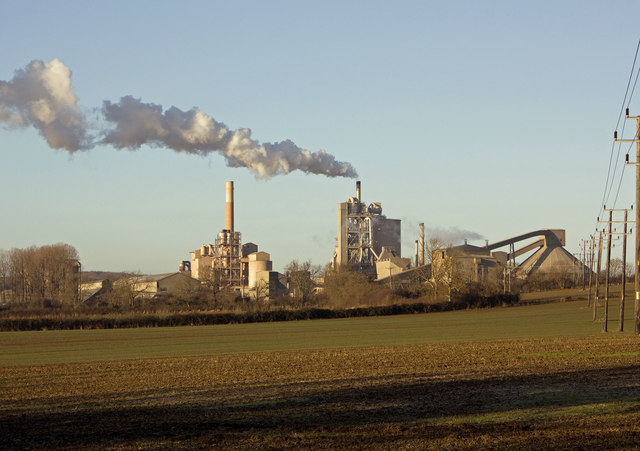
Cement kiln 8, Ketton, Rutland

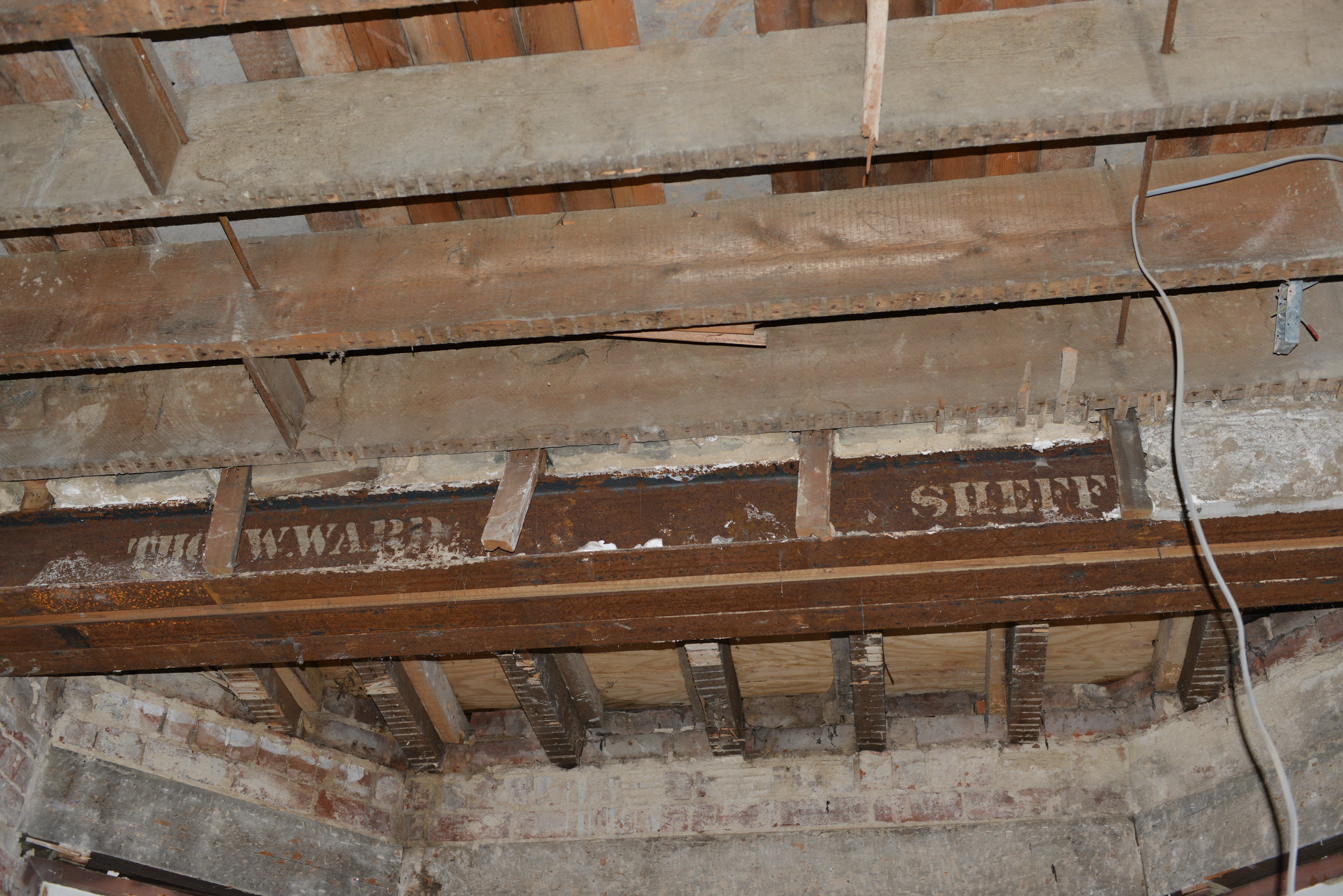
Early Thos. W. Ward steel girder

Thos. W. Ward Ltd was a British business primarily working steel, engineering and cement. It began as coal and coke merchants, later expanded into recycling metal for Sheffield's steel industry, and then the supply and manufacture of machinery.

In 1894, as part of the scrap metal operation, Ward began to set up substantial shipbreaking yards in different parts of England, and in Scotland and Wales. By 1953, Thos. W. Ward employed 11,500 people.

Ward's business was reorganised at the end of the 1970s, when it moved from being an engineering group with a motley assortment of subsidiaries to being principally dependent on cement. In 1982, it was bought by Rio Tinto Zinc.

== History ==
This business was founded by Thomas William Ward in 1878 with the name Thos. W. Ward. Ward's provided coal and coke, and very soon recycling or scrap metal services. It added dealing in new and used machinery related to the iron, steel, coal, engineering and allied industries, and manufacturing that machinery.

Ward's Constructional Engineering Department manufactured and erected steel-framed buildings, bridges, collieries, steel works equipment and furnaces. The Rail Department supplied light and heavy rails, sleepers, switches and crossings, and equipped complete sidings. De Lank Quarries produced the granite for Tower Bridge and Blackfriars Bridge, as well as major lighthouses and prestige buildings in London and elsewhere.

In 1894, Ward's moved into shipbreaking at many different locations. On 19 May 1904, a limited liability company was formed and registered, to manage all the businesses operating under the name Thos. W. Ward. By 1920, when raising further capital from the public, the prospectus claimed these notable aspects of Thos. W. Ward: "Premier shipbreaking firm in the world, largest stockholders to the iron, steel and machinery trades, constructional engineers, merchants, etc."

=== Portland cement ===
New capital was raised from the public in 1928 to establish a new greenfield Portland cement business at Ketton in Rutland, on 1,170 acres of freehold land, containing oolitic limestone and clays suitable for the production of the highest quality, rapid-hardening Portland cement. It was a particular project of new chairman Joseph Ward (1865–1941), brother of Thomas Ward (1853–1926). Ketton Cement Works became the core activity of Ward's in the late 1970s.

After 55 years, in 1934, when the employees numbered in excess of 4,000 people, the principal businesses were:

- Construction, mechanical and electrical engineering manufacturers
- Coal coke iron steel metal and machinery factors and merchants
- Ship and works dismantlers, owners and brokers
- Wharf owners
- Machinery and plant valuers
- Nut and bolt manufacturers
- Horn handle manufacturers for cutlery
- Brick manufacturers
- Dry slag and tar macadam manufacturers
- Quarrying

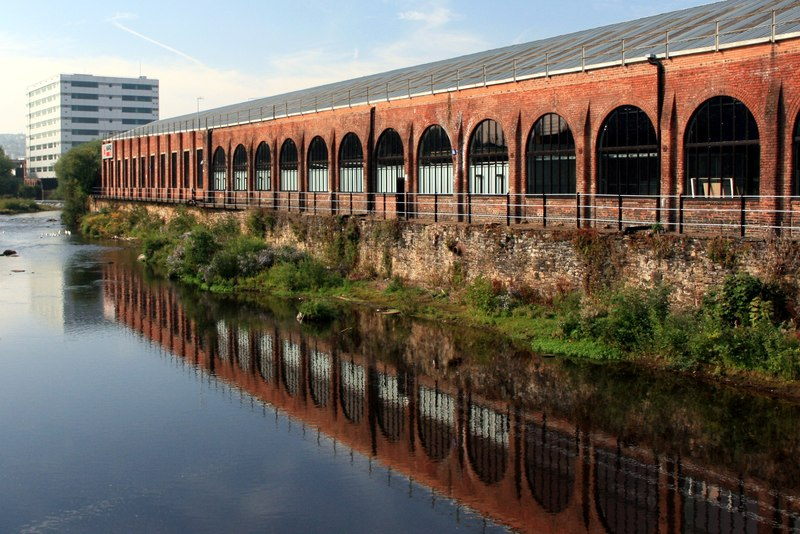
Albion Works, 2013

Freehold Premises:

Albion Works, Tinsley and Millhouses, Sheffield
and at Silvertown, Grays (Essex), Inverkeithing, Glasgow, Wishaw, Birmingham, Briton Ferry, Milford Haven, Lelant, Silverdale, Low Moor (Bradford), Albion (Mansfield) sand quarries etc and Brickworks at Longton, Newark and Apedale

Leasehold Premises:

Charlton Works and Effingham Road, Sheffield
Liverpool, Dublin, Cornish Granite Quarries (De Lank), Denny, Preston, Barrow-in-Furness, Pembroke Dock, Hayle and Scunthorpe.

Subsidiaries:

- Milford Haven Dock & Railway Company, Low Moor Best Yorkshire Iron, The Midland Iron Co, Pengwern and Gwydir Quarries, The Drybrook Quarries, North Lonsdale Tar Macadam.
- The Ketton Portland Cement Co. (controlling interest)

=== W. S. Laycock ===
This old-established business was bought in 1934. Laycock's made railway carriage and steamship fittings, underframes for locomotives and railway coaches, and automobile axles, gearboxes, propeller shafts and Laycock's own Layrub flexible drive joints. Two years later, Laycock Engineering was sold to some investors.

=== 1970s ===
By 1969, the Ward group was believed to be primarily in metal supply, particularly from ship breaking, but also producing cement, supplying roadstone, constructing rail sidings, and building new industrial works and equipping them with the necessary plant and machinery.

== Division ==
In October 1981, Thos. W. Ward's was split into three:

- Thos. W. Ward (Raw Materials) the former iron and steel division active in processing and merchanting carbon scrap, special steel scrap, non-ferrous scrap metals and steel stockholding.
- Thos. W. Ward (Industrial Supplies)
- Thos. W. Ward (Industrial Dismantling)

Within a short time, Rio Tinto Zinc (RTZ) began to buy a substantial shareholding and the takeover was completed in early 1982. RTZ amalgamated the Ward cement operation with that of Tunnel Holdings, and named the combination RTZ Cement, which then had about one quarter of the UK cement market. The Railway Engineers department of Thos. W Ward was bought by Henry Boot. RTZ sold Thos. W. Ward (Roadstone) to Ready Mixed Concrete in June 1988.

== Dismantling ==
Works dismantled before 1926: Abbott's Works, Gateshead; Bowling Ironworks; Kelham Rolling Mills, Sheffield; Derwent Rolling Mills, Workington; Dearne & Dove Works; West Cumberland Whittington Works, Crawshay's Cyfarthfa Works, Bessemer's Works, Bolton; Mars Ironworks, Wolverhampton; Effingham Nut and Bolt Works, Sheffield. Thos W. Ward. also dismantled the Crystal Palace.

== Shipbreaking ==
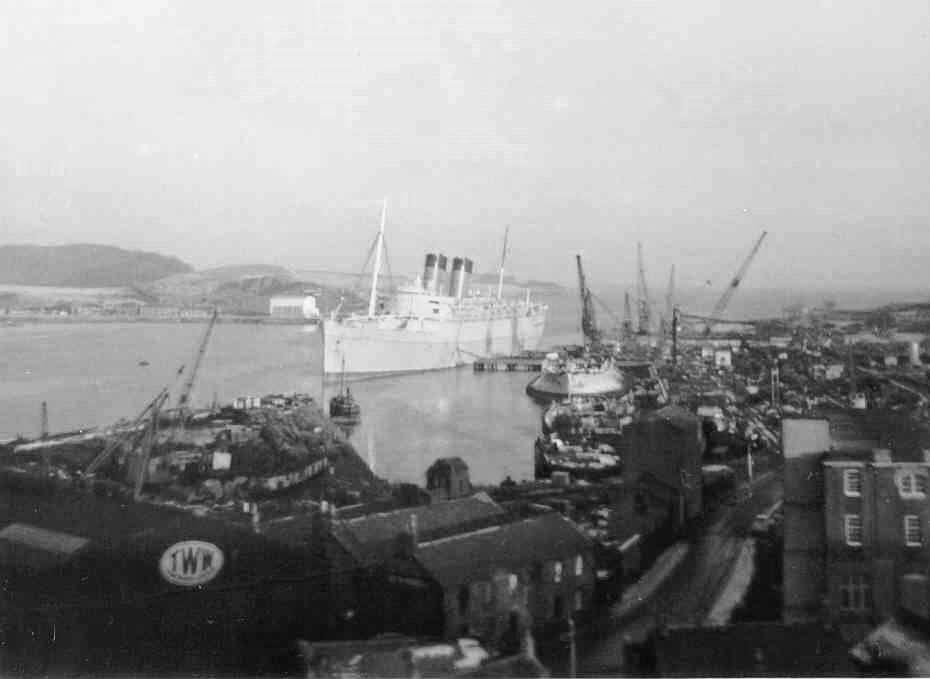
The RMS Mauretania arrives at Inverkeithing ready to be broken for scrap, 1965

=== Location not defined ===
- HMS Akbar
- HMS Benbow
- HMS Boadicea
- HMS Centurion
- HMS Colossus
- HMS Devastation
- HMS Edinburgh
- HMS Narcissus
- HMS Nile
- HMS Prince Albert
- HMS Sans Pareil
- HMS Warspite
- SS Adriatic
- SS Alaska
- SS Arabic
- SS Britannia
- SS Cleopatra
- Cordoba
- RMS Etruria
- SS Furnessia
- SS Leviathan
- RMS Lucania
- SS Majestic
- SS Munchen
- SS Servia
- SS Syrian
- Terec
- SS Vancouver
- RMS Saragossa
- RMS Cherbourg

=== At Inverkeithing ===
- HMS Magnificent (1922)
- HMS Dreadnought (1923)
- HMS Mars (1929)
- SS Zeeland (1930)
- HMS Tiger (1932)
- RMS Cedric (1932)
- HMS Spenser (August 1936)
- HMS Turbulent (August 1936)
- HMS Valkyrie (August 1936)
- HMS Vectis (August 1936)
- HMS Venturous (August 1936)
- HMS Seafire (September 1936)
- HMS Serene (September 1936)
- HMS Swallow (September 1936)
- HMS Trojan (1937)
- HMS Trusty (1937)
- HMS Violent (March 1937)
- RMS Olympic (Hull only during 1937; the superstructure was removed at Jarrow between 1935 and 1937)
- HMS Caledonia (1943)
- HMS Otway (September 1945)
- HMS Uproar (February 1946)
- HMS Unruly (February 1946)
- HMS Unsparing (14 February 1946)
- HMS Revenge (1948)
- HMS Royal Sovereign (1948)
- HMS Nelson (1949)
- HMS Rodney (1949)
- RMS Empress of Australia (1952)
- HMS Formidable (1953)
- SS Mulbera (1954)
- RMS Maloja (1954)
- HMS Implacable (1955)
- RMS Scythia (1958)
- HMS Glory (1961)
- MV Britannic (1961)
- HMS Thule (14 September 1962)
- HMS Concord (R63) (22 October 1962)
- RMS Mauretania (1965) (Cunard's second Mauretania)
- MT Haakon Hauan (1960)
- SS Ambrose (1946)
- SS Hilary (1959)
- HMS Howe, June 1958 → 1960/61
- HMS Armada (1965)
- HMS Alaric (July 1971)
- HMS Ambush (July 1971)
- HMS Anchorite (July 1971)
- HMS Aisne (1970)
- HMS Maidstone (May 1978)
- HMS Roberts (1965)
- MV Robert Ley (1947)
- HMS Lion (1975)

=== At Briton Ferry ===
- HMS Adventure
- HMS Bellona
- HMS Bermuda
- HMS Cambrian
- HMS Croome
- HMS Crossbow
- HMS Cumberland
- HMS Dee
- HMS Druid
- El Inca (1979)
- HMS Fury
- HMS Gloucester
- HMS Hardy
- HMS Howe
- HMS Loch Dunvegan
- Marrakech (1979)
- HMS Mutine
- HMS Revenge
- HMS Rother
- HMS Royal Oak
- HMS Shakespeare
- HMS Taciturn
- HMS Tally-Ho
- HMS Tempest
- HMS Tenby
- HMS Thrasher
- HMS Tonbridge
- HMS Tuna
- HMS Venus
- HMS Zambesi
- RFA Salvestor
- SS Empire Rest
- ST Sea Alarm
- HMCS Nene
- HMS Hampshire
- HMAS Brisbane
- HMAS Napier

=== At Grays ===
- HMS Ark Royal
- HMS Sapphire (1904)
- HMS Berkeley Castle
- HMS Bicester
- HMS Carstairs
- HMS Contest
- HMS Foylebank
- HMS Hydra
- HMS L2
- HMS Lance
- HMS Laverock
- HMS Liffey
- HMS Spirit
- HMS Tiverton
- HMS Walpole
- MV Sand Star
- RFA Robert Dundas
- RFA Sea Salvor
- SS Holdernith
- Cutty Sark

=== At Preston ===
- HMS Dominion
- RMS Etruria
- HMS Hind
- HMS Hindustan
- HMS Holderness
- HMS Jed
- HMS Nith
- HMS Ribble
- HMS Skirmisher
- HMS Starfish
- HMS Sutlej
- HMS Swale
- HMS Welland
- SS Aleppo
- SS Staveley
- HMS Exe

=== At Barrow-in-Furness ===
- HMS Blencathra
- HMS Dido
- HMS Garth
- HMS Meteorite
- HMS Scylla
- HMS Southdown
- HMS Whitehall
- RFA Abbeydale
- SS Baxtergate
- TSS Duke of Clarence
- HMS Explorer
- HMS Excalibur
- HMS London
- HMAS Australia
- RMS Empress of Russia
- SS Bendigo
- HMT Dongola

=== At Morecambe ===
- HMS Diadem
- HMS Glasgow
- HMS Imperieuse
- HMS Northampton
- HMS Orlando
- HMS Raleigh
- HMS Repulse
- RMS Majestic
- SS Ben-my-Chree
- SS Ionic

=== At Pembroke Dock ===
- HMS Birmingham
- HMS Chatham
- HMS Leamington
- HMS Southampton
- HMT Richard Bacon
- RFA Salvestor
- RMS Victorian

=== At Milford Haven ===
- HMS Kangaroo
- HMS Opportune
- HMS Prince of Wales
- HMS Tetcott
- HMS Watchman

=== At Lelant or Hayle ===
- HMS Aberdeen
- HMS Acasta
- HMS Bellona
- HMS Bristol
- HMS Chelmer
- HMS Cockatrice
- HMS Fareham
- HMS Newcastle
- HMS Tartar
- SS Lyonesse

== Lizzie the elephant ==
At the outbreak of World War I, 1,235 people were on the payroll of Thomas Ward's company and a thousand tons of scrap metal per day was being fed to the country's steel makers. With demand so high, and many of the horses Ward had previously used to transport his goods around Sheffield requisitioned by the military, he had an increasingly difficult time to match supply with demand. Lizzie the Elephant was brought in as a solution to the problem.

After work horses from Thomas Ward's were sent or requisitioned to the front in World War I, Lizzie the Elephant was drafted in from Sedgwick's Menagerie, a travelling circus run by William Sedgwick (1841–1927). The elephant was said to be able to do the work of three of Ward's horses and soon got herself the name "Tommy Ward's Elephant" as she became a familiar sight carrying or hauling goods around Sheffield, controlled by her trainer Richard Sedgwick (1875–1931) (son of the circus ringleader William Sedgwick). Lizzie was said to have inspired other Sheffield firms to creative means with their wartime transport, and a company in the Wicker area of the city was said to have used camels, also from Sedgwick's Menagerie, in place of their own horses.

== Publications ==
- Colledge, J. J.; Warlow, Ben (2006) [1969]. Ships of the Royal Navy: The Complete Record of All Fighting Ships of the Royal Navy from the 15th Century to the Present (3rd Rev ed.). London: Chatham Publishing. ISBN 978-1-86176-281-8. OCLC 67375475.
- Ormston, John M (1998). The Final Berth: Columbia Wharf: Shipbreaking at Thos. W. Ward Limited, Grays. Grays: JM Ormston. ISBN 0953304701.
