= SS Folia =

British passenger ship (1907–1917)

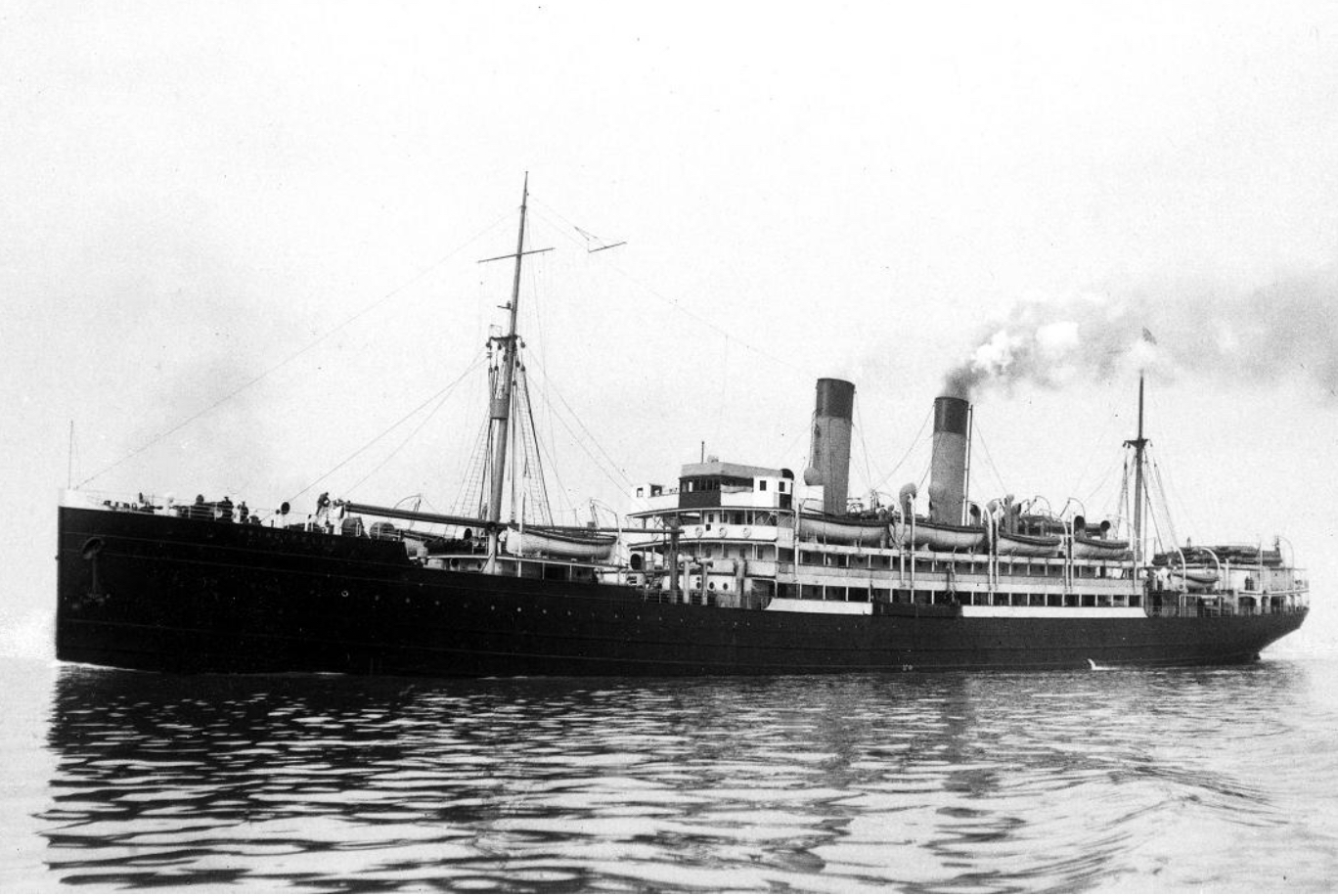
- SS Folia as SS Principello on 11 June 1914

History

United Kingdom
- Name: (Kingdom of Italy) Principe di Piemonte (1907–1914); (United Kingdom) Principello (1914–1916); (United Kingdom) Folia (1916–1917)
- Owner: Lloyd Sabaudo Soc. Anon. Per Azioni - Societa Marittima Italiana (1907–1914); Canadian Northern Steamships (1914–1916); Cunard Line (1916–1917)
- Port of registry: (Kingdom of Italy) Genoa, Italy; London, United Kingdom; Liverpool, United Kingdom
- Route: Genoa – New York (1907–1914); Rotterdam – New York (1914–1915); Avonmouth – New York (1915–1917)
- Builder: Laing James & Sons Ltd.
- Yard number: 623
- Laid down: 1907
- Launched: 28 February 1907
- Completed: 19 June 1907
- Maiden voyage: 19 June 1907
- In service: 19 June 1907
- Out of service: 11 March 1917
- Identification: Official number: 136640
- Fate: Torpedoed and sunk 11 March 1917
- Notes: Call letters: JDWF

General characteristics
- Type: Passenger ship
- Tonnage: 6,705 GRT
- Length: 131.1 m (430 ft 1 in)
- Beam: 16.1 m (52 ft 10 in)
- Depth: 7.6 m (24 ft 11 in)
- Installed power: 2 triple expansion steam engines
- Propulsion: 2 screw propellers
- Sail plan: 2 masts and 2 funnels
- Speed: 14 knots (26 km/h; 16 mph)
- Capacity: 120 first class, 50 second class and 1500 steerage passengers
- Crew: 78

SS Folia was a British passenger ship of the Cunard Line that was torpedoed and sunk by the German submarine SM U-53 4 nautical miles (7.4 km) east south east of Ram Head, Ireland in the Atlantic Ocean on 11 March 1917 with the loss of seven crew, while she was travelling from New York, United States to Avonmouth, United Kingdom while carrying general cargo.

== Construction ==
Folia was launched on 28 February 1907 at the Laing James & Sons Ltd. shipyard in Sunderland, United Kingdom and completed on 19 June 1907. She was named Principe di Piemonte and was a sister ship of Re d'Italia and Regina d'Italia. The ship was 131.1 metres (430 ft 1 in) long, with a beam of 16.1 metres (52 ft 10 in) and a depth of 7.6 metres (24 ft 11 in). The ship was assessed at 6,705 gross register tons (GRT) and had two triple expansion steam engines driving two screw propellers producing 413 horsepower (308 kW) with the use of five boilers. The ship could reach a maximum speed of 14 knots (26 km/h; 16 mph) and possessed two masts and two funnels. As built, she had the capacity to carry 120 first class passengers, 50 second class passengers and 1,500 steerage passengers.

== Career ==
Principe di Piemonte departed Genoa, Italy on route to New York, United States via Naples and Palermo on her maiden voyage on 19 June 1907. While on route to New York on 17 July 1912, a steam pipe from one of the boilers onboard burst and killed the first engineer, the chief of the firemen and three stokers. She completed her final voyage under her Italian owner on 12 December 1913 before she was sold to the Uranium Steamship Company in 1914 as a replacement for SS Volturno which had sunk following a fire in 1913. Principe di Piemonte was renamed Principello and sailed her new route from Rotterdam, Netherlands to New York via Halifax, Canada for the first time on 14 February 1914. Her route changed to sail the Avonmouth, United Kingdom to New York beginning on 9 April 1915.

Principello was transferred to the Cunard Line in 1916 to compensate for the many vessels Cunard had already lost in World War I. The ship was renamed Folia and continued to sail the same route as under her previous owner, only this time being primarily used as a cargo ship instead of carrying passengers and due to the danger of the ship falling victim to the German U-boats, a 12-inch deck gun was installed so she could potentially defend herself against the U-boat threat. The ship was thereby classified as a defensively armed merchant ship.

== Sinking ==
Folia was travelling from New York to Avonmouth under the command of Captain Francis James Daniel Inch (who had survived the wreck of Volturno in 1913) while carrying 4,400 tons of general cargo which included trench digging machinery and shell cases, when at 7.15 am on 11 March 1917 as the ship was 4 nautical miles (7.4 km) east south east of Ram Head, Ireland, the third officer of Folia spotted a periscope about 150 metres (490 ft) from the ship followed by the wakes of two torpedoes. There was no time to take evasive action and Folia was hit by one of the torpedoes amidships, which destroyed two of her lifeboats and killed seven of her crew including the second officer. As the ship began to settle in the water, Captain Inch ordered his men to board the remaining four lifeboats and abandon ship. Following the successful evacuation of everyone on board, German submarine U-53 surfaced and circled the stricken vessel before they fired four shells from the U-boat's deck gun and hit the ship with another torpedo. Following this final attack, the U-boat departed the scene and Captain Inch regrouped the four lifeboats carrying 78 survivors and ordered his men to make way for the Irish coast. The lifeboats reached the Irish shore by 11am and the survivors were aided by the inhabitants of nearby Ardmore and taken to Dungarvan that evening where they were supplied with food, clothes and accommodation.

== Wreck ==
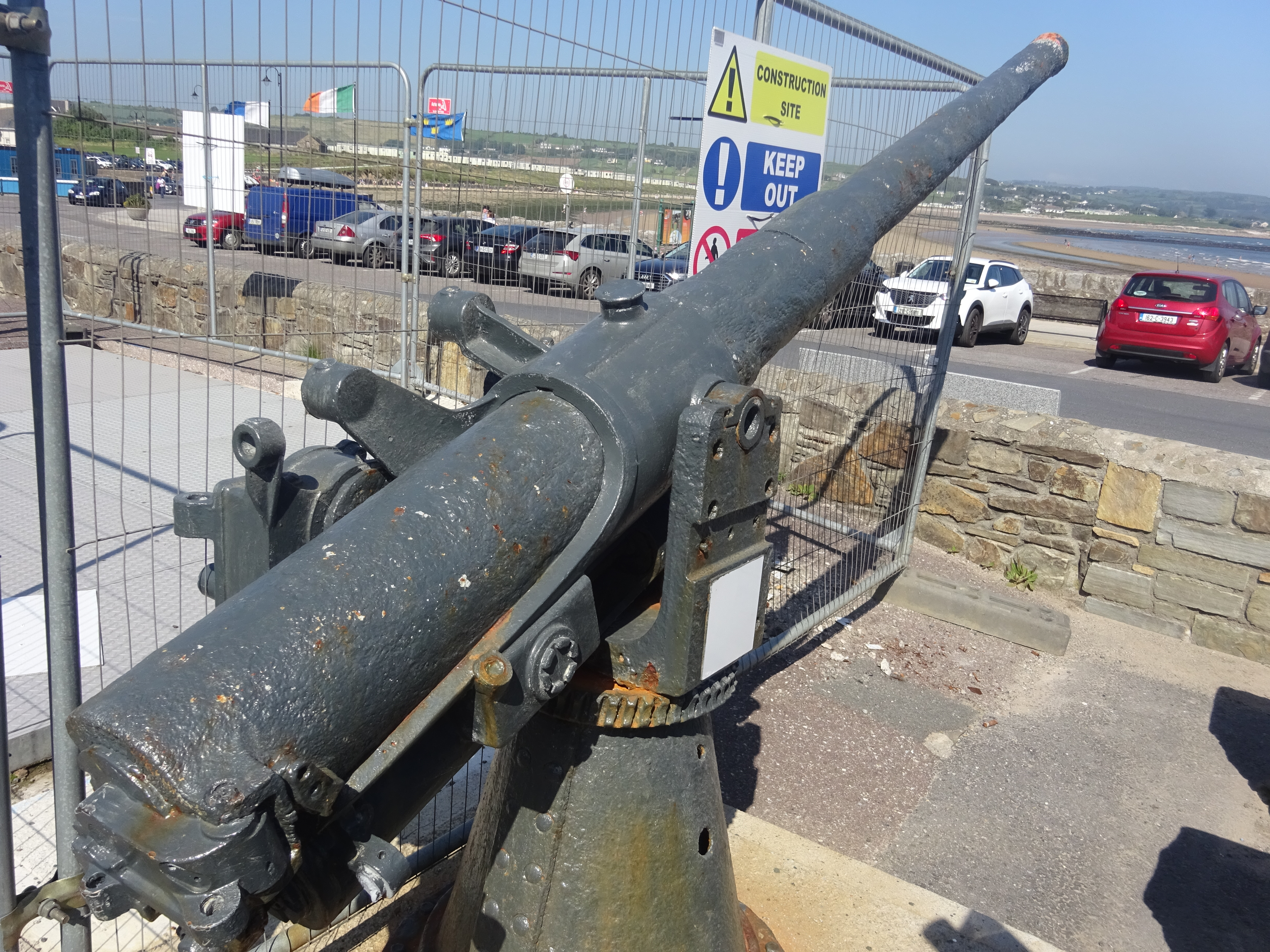
Deck gun salvaged from the wreck of Folia in 2021.

The wreck of Folia lies at (51°55′N 07°35′W) in 118 feet (36 m) of water. In mid 1977, the vast quantity of brass bars that was aboard the wreck was salvaged by Risdon Beazley. This salvage operation however, resulted in the wreck being seriously damaged while the remaining amount of brass was salvaged by local divers in the 1980s. Most of the wreck lies scattered in steel plates amongst which lay many shell casings. The bow is one of the most intact and recognisable features left on the ship alongside the boilers which also contain the highest point on the wreck at 16 feet (5 m). The most damaged part of the wreck is the aft section where the superstructure is completely destroyed but the rudder is still intact. The wreck is one of the largest in the area within sport-diving depths and is therefore a popular diving spot. The deck gun of Folia was recovered from the wreck in 2014 and is now on display in Ardmore, two of the ship's propeller blades were also salvaged by local divers and can be found in Dungarvan.
