= SM UC-48 =

German Type UC II minelaying U-boat

History

German Empire
- Name: UC-48
- Ordered: 20 November 1915
- Builder: AG Weser, Bremen
- Yard number: 258
- Laid down: 1 February 1916
- Launched: 27 September 1916
- Commissioned: 6 November 1916
- Fate: Interned at Ferrol, Spain, 23 March 1918

General characteristics
- Class & type: Type UC II submarine
- Displacement: 420 t (410 long tons), surfaced; 502 t (494 long tons), submerged
- Length: 51.85 m (170 ft 1 in) o/a; 39.70 m (130 ft 3 in) pressure hull
- Beam: 5.22 m (17 ft 2 in) o/a; 3.65 m (12 ft) pressure hull
- Draught: 3.67 m (12 ft 0 in)
- Propulsion: 2 × propeller shafts; 2 × 6-cylinder, 4-stroke diesel engines, 600 PS (440 kW; 590 shp); 2 × electric motors, 460 PS (340 kW; 450 shp)
- Speed: 11.7 knots (21.7 km/h; 13.5 mph), surfaced; 6.7 knots (12.4 km/h; 7.7 mph), submerged
- Range: 7,280 nmi (13,480 km; 8,380 mi) at 7 knots (13 km/h; 8.1 mph) surfaced; 54 nmi (100 km; 62 mi) at 4 knots (7.4 km/h; 4.6 mph) submerged
- Test depth: 50 m (160 ft)
- Complement: 26
- Armament: 6 × 100 cm (39.4 in) mine tubes; 18 × UC 200 mines; 3 × 50 cm (19.7 in) torpedo tubes (2 bow/external; one stern); 7 × torpedoes; 1 × 8.8 cm (3.5 in) Uk L/30 deck gun
- Notes: 30-second diving time

Service record
- Part of: Flandern / Flandern II Flotilla; 3 February 1917 – 23 March 1918
- Commanders: Oblt.z.S. Kurt Ramien; 6 November 1916 – 20 October 1917; Oblt.z.S. Helmut Lorenz; 21 October 1917 – 23 March 1918
- Operations: 13 patrols
- Victories: 33 merchant ships sunk (66,874 GRT); 2 auxiliary warships sunk (968 GRT); 6 merchant ships damaged (23,821 GRT)

SM UC-48 was a German Type UC II minelaying submarine or U-boat in the German Imperial Navy (German: Kaiserliche Marine) during World War I. The U-boat was ordered on 20 November 1915, laid down on 1 February 1916, and was launched on 27 September 1916. She was commissioned into the German Imperial Navy on 6 November 1916 as SM UC-48. (Note: "SM" stands for "Seiner Majestät" (English: His Majesty's) and combined with the U for Unterseeboot would be translated as His Majesty's Submarine.) In 13 patrols UC-48 was credited with sinking 35 ships, either by torpedo or by mines laid. UC-48 was severely damaged by a depth charge attack by HMS Loyal on 20 March 1918 that ruptured the fuel tanks. Unable to return to Zeebrugge, the boat was steered to Ferrol, Spain, where she and her crew were interned for the rest of the war. The Spanish authorities removed UC-48's propellers to prevent any attempts at leaving port.

== Design ==
A Type UC II submarine, UC-48 had a displacement of 420 tonnes (410 long tons) when at the surface and 502 tonnes (494 long tons) while submerged. She had a length overall of 51.85 m (170 ft 1 in), a beam of 5.22 m (17 ft 2 in), and a draught of 3.68 m (12 ft 1 in). The submarine was powered by two six-cylinder four-stroke diesel engines each producing 300 metric horsepower (220 kW; 300 shp) (a total of 600 metric horsepower (440 kW; 590 shp)), two electric motors producing 460 metric horsepower (340 kW; 450 shp), and two propeller shafts. She had a dive time of 48 seconds and was capable of operating at a depth of 50 metres (160 ft).

The submarine had a maximum surface speed of 11.7 knots (21.7 km/h; 13.5 mph) and a submerged speed of 6.7 knots (12.4 km/h; 7.7 mph). When submerged, she could operate for 54 nautical miles (100 km; 62 mi) at 4 knots (7.4 km/h; 4.6 mph); when surfaced, she could travel 7,280 nautical miles (13,480 km; 8,380 mi) at 7 knots (13 km/h; 8.1 mph). UC-48 was fitted with six 100 centimetres (39 in) mine tubes, eighteen UC 200 mines, three 50 centimetres (20 in) torpedo tubes (one on the stern and two on the bow), seven torpedoes, and one 8.8 cm (3.5 in) Uk L/30 deck gun. Her complement was twenty-six crew members.

== Summary of raiding history ==
| Date | Name | Nationality | Tonnage (Note: Merchant ship tonnages are in gross register tons. Military vessels are listed by tons displacement.) | Fate |
|---|---|---|---|---|
| 16 March 1917 | Pencaer | United Kingdom | 59 | Sunk |
| 16 March 1917 | William Martyn | United Kingdom | 104 | Sunk |
| 17 March 1917 | Antony | United Kingdom | 6,466 | Sunk |
| 17 March 1917 | Guard | United Kingdom | 38 | Sunk |
| 21 March 1917 | Rio Sorocaba | United Kingdom | 4,307 | Sunk |
| 22 March 1917 | Chorley | United Kingdom | 3,828 | Sunk |
| 22 March 1917 | Providence | United Kingdom | 2,970 | Sunk |
| 23 March 1917 | J. B. August Kessler | Netherlands | 5,104 | Damaged |
| 25 March 1917 | HMT Evangel | Royal Navy | 197 | Sunk |
| 27 April 1917 | Amelia & Jane | United Kingdom | 62 | Damaged |
| 1 May 1917 | Raymond Ester | France | 20 | Sunk |
| 2 May 1917 | United | United Kingdom | 61 | Sunk |
| 2 May 1917 | Warnow | United Kingdom | 1,593 | Sunk |
| 5 May 1917 | Feltria | United Kingdom | 5,254 | Sunk |
| 5 May 1917 | Greta | United Kingdom | 297 | Sunk |
| 7 May 1917 | Kinross | United Kingdom | 4,120 | Sunk |
| 9 June 1917 | Amphitrite | Portugal | 179 | Sunk |
| 10 June 1917 | Solhaug | Norway | 1,217 | Sunk |
| 13 June 1917 | Ernestine | France | 160 | Sunk |
| 15 June 1917 | Eugene Et Eugenie | France | 46 | Sunk |
| 16 June 1917 | John D. Archbold | United States | 8,374 | Sunk |
| 17 June 1917 | Anjou | French Navy | 771 | Sunk |
| 17 June 1917 | Antonios M. Mavrogordatos | Greece | 3,771 | Sunk |
| 18 June 1917 | Tyne | United Kingdom | 2,909 | Sunk |
| 15 July 1917 | Florence Creadick | United States | 732 | Damaged |
| 15 July 1917 | Westmeath | United Kingdom | 9,179 | Damaged |
| 16 July 1917 | Henry R. James | United Kingdom | 3,146 | Sunk |
| 18 August 1917 | Dunkerquois | France | 2,087 | Sunk |
| 19 August 1917 | Monksgarth | United Kingdom | 1,928 | Sunk |
| 19 August 1917 | Ytterøy | Norway | 1,112 | Sunk |
| 16 September 1917 | Sandsend | United Kingdom | 3,814 | Sunk |
| 17 September 1917 | Our Bairns | United Kingdom | 50 | Sunk |
| 17 September 1917 | Ronald | United Kingdom | 38 | Sunk |
| 19 September 1917 | Etal Manor | United Kingdom | 1,875 | Sunk |
| 21 September 1917 | Kouang-Si | France | 6,472 | Damaged |
| 14 October 1917 | Barbro | Norway | 2,356 | Sunk |
| 14 October 1917 | Castro | Greece | 1,994 | Sunk |
| 15 October 1917 | Hovde | Norway | 1,196 | Sunk |
| 22 October 1917 | Aizcorri Mendi | Spain | 2,272 | Damaged |
| 17 November 1917 | Modemi | Norway | 1,481 | Sunk |
| 30 January 1918 | Ange Gardien | France | 24 | Sunk |
