= SS Baxtergate =

Cargo ship

History
- Name: Empire Cowdray (1944-48); Granhill (1948-51); Baxtergate (1951-60)
- Owner: Ministry of War Transport (1944-45); Ministry of Transport (1945-48); Goulandris Bros (1948-51); Turnbull, Scott & Co (1951-60); British Iron and Steel Corporation (1960)
- Operator: Alexander Steamship Co (1944-46); Goulandris Bros (1946-51); Turnbull, Scott & Co (1951-60); British Iron and Steel Corporation (1960)
- Port of registry: (United Kingdom) London
- Builder: Shipbuilding Corporation Ltd
- Way number: 4
- Launched: 19 August 1944
- Completed: October 1944
- Out of service: 1 December 1960
- Identification: United Kingdom Official Number 180644
- Fate: Scrapped

General characteristics
- Tonnage: 7,072grt; 4,816nett; 9,907dwt.
- Length: 447 ft 8 in (136.45 m)
- Beam: 56 ft 3 in (17.15 m)
- Propulsion: Triple expansion steam engine by John Brown & Co. Clydebank

Baxtergate was a 7,072 GRT cargo ship that was built in 1944 as Empire Cowdray by Shipbuilding Corporation Ltd, Sunderland, United Kingdom. She was built for the Ministry of War Transport (MoWT). In 1948, she was sold into merchant service and renamed Granhill. A further sale in 1951 saw her renamed Baxtergate. She served until scrapped in 1960.

== Description ==
The ship was built in 1944 by Shipbuilding Corporation Ltd, Glasgow. Launched on 19 August and completed in October, she was yard number 4.

The ship was 447 feet 8 inches (136.45 m) long, with a beam of 56 feet 3 inches (17.15 m). She was assessed at 7,072 GRT.

The ship was propelled by a triple expansion steam engine.

== History ==
=== Second World War ===
Empire Cowdray was built for the MoWT. She was initially operated under the management of the Alexander Steamship Company. Following completion in October 1944, two days of sea trials were held before the ship entered service. Following these, a cargo of coal was loaded at Hendon Docks. Once loading was complete, the crew were given a brief shore leave so that they could have a beer before the ship sailed to join a convoy. When it was time to sail, the crew ignored orders to return to their ship, not returning until being threatened with being put in jail. When the crew did return to the ship, they were too drunk to sail, causing the ship to miss the convoy. After they had sobered up, the crew were all fined for refusing the lawful command of the Captain and causing the ship to miss the convoy.

Empire Cowdray joined Convoy FS 1623, which had departed from Methil, Fife on 1 November 1944 and arrived at Southend-on-Sea, Essex on 3 November. She then joined Convoy ON 264, which departed Southend that day and arrived at Philadelphia, Pennsylvania, United States on 21 November. Empire Cowdray left the convoy to unload her coal at Baltimore, Maryland and then sailed to Philadelphia, where a cargo of grain and crated aircraft was loaded. She then joined Convoy UGS 63, which departed the Hampton Roads, Virginia on 11 December and arrived at Gibraltar on 27 December. She did not dock at Gibraltar, but proceeded to Bizerta, Tunisia, arriving on 31 December and leaving that day for Cagliari, Italy, where she arrived on 2 January 1945. Empire Cowdray was the first Allied merchant ship into Cagliari after Germany forces had left Sardinia. Several ships had been sunk as blockships and all the cranes in the harbour had been sabotaged. The ship was unloaded using her own derricks. There was no motor transport available so transport of her cargo was by horse and cart, which slowed the rate of discharge.

Empire Cowdray departed Cagliari on 12 January for Algiers, Algeria, arriving on 14 January. She departed the next day for Gibraltar, arriving on 17 January, where she joined Convoy GC 110, which arrived at Casablanca, Morocco on 18 January. She departed Casablanca on 23 January, joining Convoy GUS 67, which had departed from Oran, Algeria on 22 January and arrived at the Hampton Roads on 14 February. Her destination was Baltimore, Maryland, where she arrived on 11 February.

Empire Cowdray departed Baltimore on 3 March for the Hampton Roads, arriving the next day. She then joined Convoy UGS 78, which departed from the Hampton Roads that day and arrived at Gibraltar on 18 March. She left the convoy at Bermuda on 7 March. Two days later, Empire Cowdray departed from Hamilton, joining Convoy UGS 79, which had departed the Hampton Roads on 9 March and arrived at Casablanca on 23 March. Her destination was Port Said, Egypt, where she arrived on 1 April. Empire Cowdray then sailed to Suez from where she departed on 2 April, for Port Sudan to load a cargo of cottonseed and maize. She then sailed to Aden, arriving on 7 April. She departed Aden the next day for Colombo, Ceylon, arriving on 18 April and departing the same day for Madras, India, where she arrived on 21 April.

On 30 April, Empire Cowdray departed Madras for Calcutta, arriving on 4 May. She departed Calcutta on 24 May for Bombay, arriving on 6 June. Empire Cowdray departed Bombay on 4 July for Lourenço Marques, Mozambique, arriving on 23 July. She departed Lourenço Marques on 3 August for Aden, arriving on 17 August and departing the same day for Suez, where she arrived on 23 August. Empire Cowdray then sailed to Port Said, from where she departed on 4 September for Alexandria, Egypt, arriving the next day. She departed Alexandra on 8 September for Freetown Sierra Leone. The war ended on 15 September and the crew were allowed a half pint of lager each to celebrate. She arrived at Freetown on 24 September. From Freetown, Empire Cowdray called at Gibraltar to replenish her stores. On the morning of departure, breakfast was liver, bacon and mash. The crew complained that the liver was off, and refused to eat it, demanding a meal before they would return to work. An offer of corn flakes was turned down. The ship's First Officer told the crew that they were committing mutiny on the high seas by refusing to sail. The crew pointed out that the ship was not on the high seas, so therefore they could not be committing mutiny. After intervention by the Captain, the crew were provided with a breakfast that satisfied them. During preparation for sailing, a crew member was injured in an accident whilst the rudder was being checked. He was taken off the ship by launch and taken to hospital. Empire Cowdray sailed to South Shields, County Durham, arriving on 15 October.

=== Post-war ===
In 1946, management was transferred to Goulandris Bros Ltd, London. On 29 July 1948, Empire Cowdray was sold to her managers and was renamed Granhill. In 1950, Granhill ran aground in the Weser at Bremen, West Germany. She was refloated undamaged. In December 1950, she loaded a cargo of timber at Lagos, Nigeria. Her boilers had been filled with river water at Sapele. On 7 January 1951, one of her boilers failed due to sludge. The ship was in the Bay of Biscay at the time. She had to be taken in tow and various expenses were sustained by Goulandris Bros. In 1957, the owners of the timber successfully sued Goulandris Brothers for £22 10s 4d for losses incurred due to the late delivery of the timber. There was disagreement between the two sides as to whether the Hague Rules or York-Antwerp Rules applied. The judge deciding that the latter applied.

In 1951, Granhill was sold for £350,000 to Turnbull, Scott & Co Ltd and was renamed Baxtergate. In 1960, she was sold to the British Iron & Steel Corporation. Baxtergate arrived at Barrow in Furness, Lancashire on 1 December 1960 with a load of iron ore from Bône, Algeria. After the cargo was discharged, she was scrapped by Thos. W. Ward, Barrow in Furness.
