= SS Aleppo =

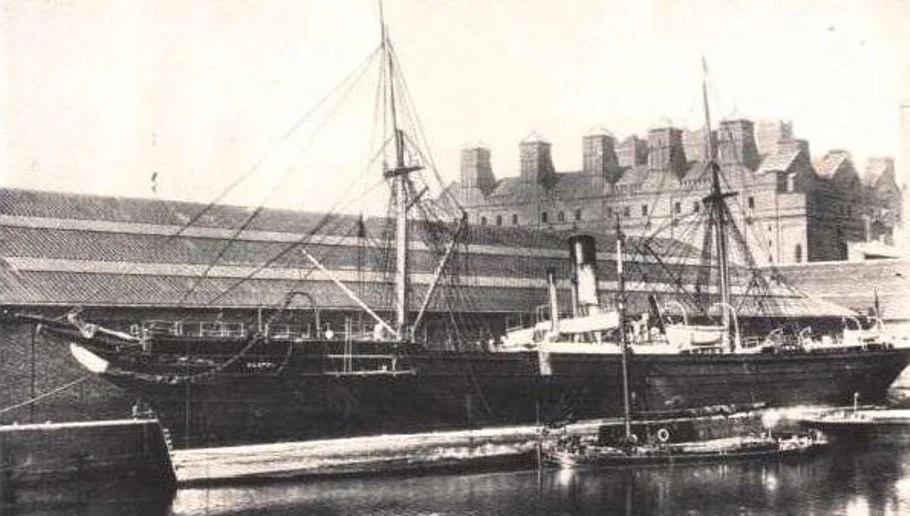

History
- Name: SS Aleppo
- Namesake: Aleppo
- Owner: British & Foreign Steam Navigation Company, Glasgow (1864–1878); Cunard Steam Ship Co. Ltd., Liverpool (1878–1909)
- Builder: James & George Thomson, Govan
- Yard number: 78
- Launched: 1 November 1864
- Completed: 1865
- Fate: Scrapped in 1909

General characteristics
- Tonnage: 2,057 gross register tons (GRT); 1,459 net register tons (NRT)
- Length: 292.5 ft (89.2 m)
- Beam: 38.2 ft (11.6 m)
- Draught: 26.2 ft (8.0 m)
- Installed power: 280 hp
- Propulsion: 1 – 2 cylinder steam engine; 1 screw

SS Aleppo was a British passenger cargo vessel, launched on 1 November 1864, measuring 292.5 feet by 38.2 feet, 2,057 gross tonnage, built in Glasgow by J & G Thomson, Govan. She made her first North Atlantic voyage from Liverpool to Halifax to New York City beginning on 15 September 1865. The Aleppo had accommodation for 46 first class and 593 third class passengers. The ship was commissioned for the British & Foreign Steam Navigation Company, Glasgow, a company established in 1855 to run the Mediterranean shipping interests of the investors of the British and North American Royal Mail Steam-Packet Company, the forerunner of the Cunard Line. In 1878 the firms were reorganised, the British & Foreign Steam Navigation Company and its ships were merged into the Cunard Steam Ship Co. Ltd., and Aleppo was transferred on 7 September 1878.

In 1880, the ship was fitted with compound engines and in 1890, the SS Aleppo was re-engined with triple-expansion engines by J. Howden & Co. The ship made its last North Atlantic voyage from Liverpool to Boston on 24 March 1892. In 1905, the SS Aleppo was broken up at Preston by Thos. W. Ward. Her figurehead is preserved in the collections of Mystic Seaport, Connecticut.
