= SS Scythia =

Cunard line ship

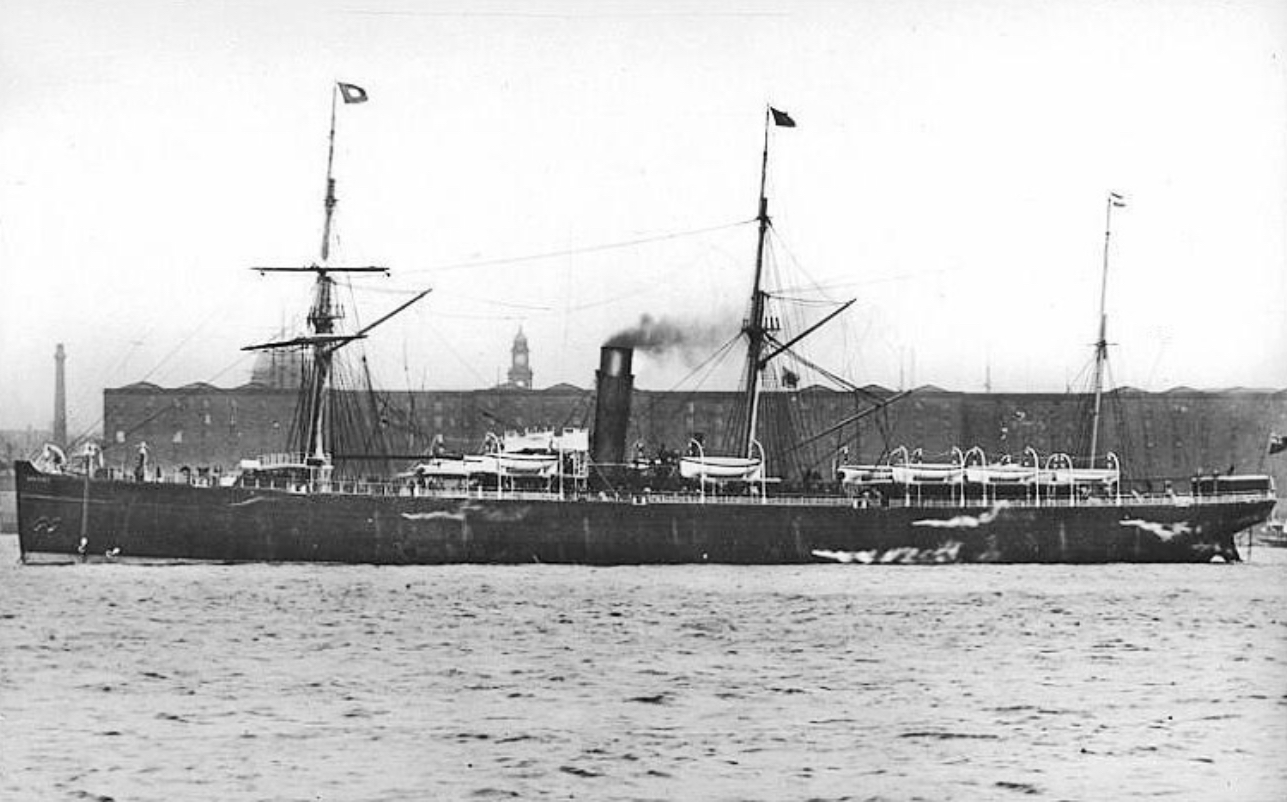

History

United Kingdom
- Name: SS Scythia
- Owner: Cunard Line
- Port of registry: Liverpool
- Builder: James & George Thomson, Clydebank
- Yard number: 129
- Launched: 28 October 1874
- Completed: May 1875
- Maiden voyage: 1 May 1875
- In service: 1875
- Out of service: 1898
- Identification: United Kingdom Official Number 71693
- Fate: Scrapped 1899

General characteristics
- Type: Ocean liner
- Tonnage: 4,557 GRT
- Length: 420.8 ft (128.3 m)
- Beam: 42.2 ft (12.9 m)
- Depth: 18.9 ft (5.8 m)
- Propulsion: 1 × 600 hp (447 kW) steam compound steam engine
- Speed: 13 knots (24 km/h; 15 mph)
- Capacity: 300 first class and 1,100 steerage passengers

SS Scythia was a British steam passenger ship that sailed on the trans-Atlantic route between Liverpool and New York City, and later Boston. The ship was built by James & George Thomson of Clydebank, and launched on 28 October 1874 for the British & North American Royal Mail Steam Packet Company, which became the Cunard Line in 1879.

Scythia was built with an iron hull, with a gross register tonnage of 4,557, and a length of 420.8 feet long. She was powered by a single 600 hp 2-cylinder compound steam engine and had a top speed of 13 knots.

Scythia sailed on her maiden voyage from Liverpool to New York via Queenstown on 1 May 1875, and made her first voyage from Liverpool to Boston on 13 June 1884. She was retired from service in 1898, and was scrapped in Genoa, Italy in 1899.
