= SS Avoca =

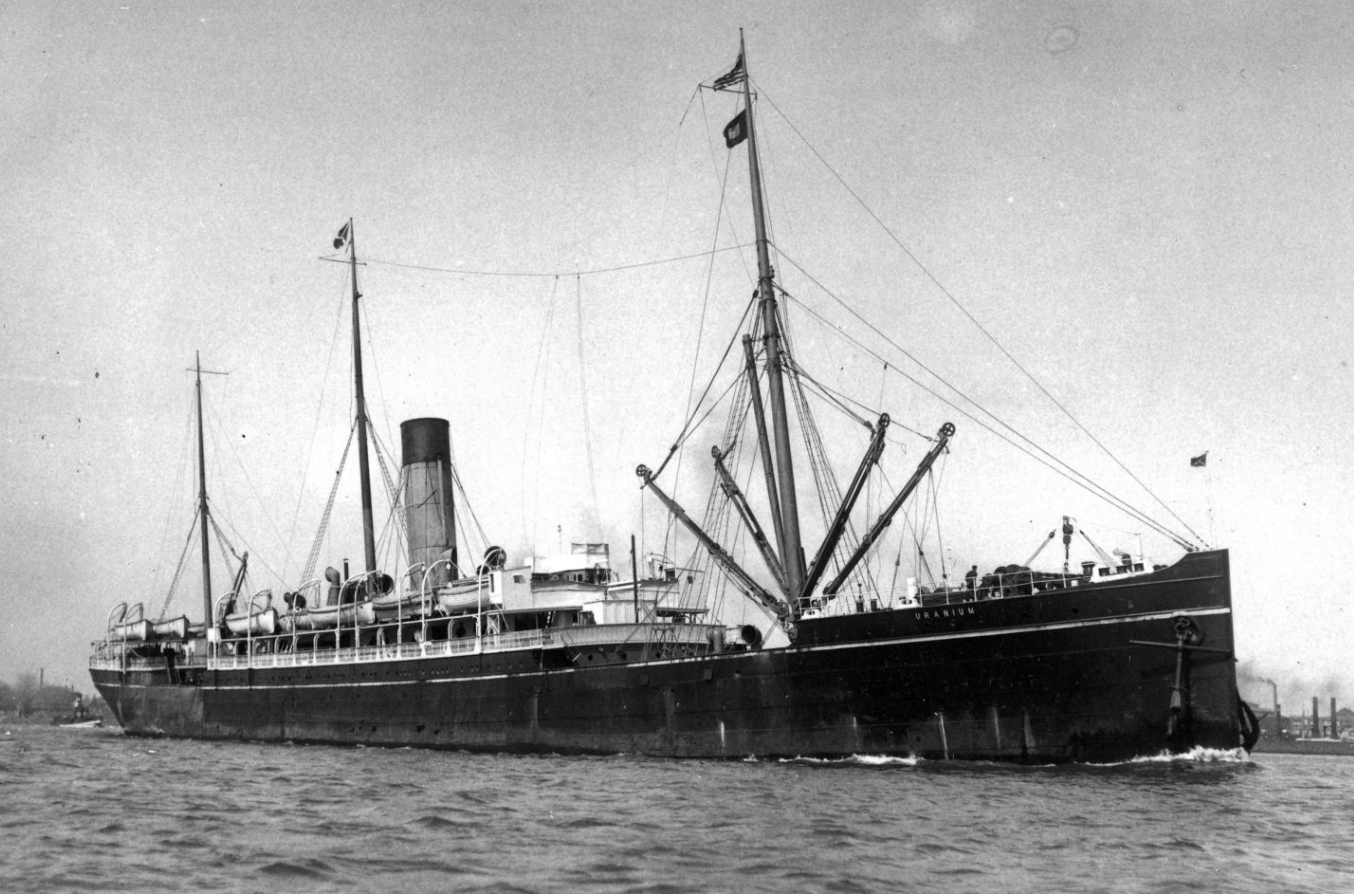
- Avoca as Uranium

History

United Kingdom
- Name: Avoca (1891–1895) (1897–1907) (1908–1909); San Fernando (1895–1897); Atlanta (1907–1908); Uranium (1909–1916); Feltria (1916–1917)
- Owner: British India Associated Steamers (1891–1895) (1897–1903); Compañía Transatlántica Española (1895–1897); British India Steam Navigation Company (1903–1907); East Asiatic Company (1907–1908); New York & Continental Line (1908–1909); Uranium Line (1909-1916); Cunard Line (1916–1917)
- Port of registry: Glasgow (1891–1985) (1897–1903); Barcelona (1895–1897); London (1903-1907) (1908–1916); Copenhagen (1907–1908); Liverpool (1916–1917)
- Builder: William Denny & Bros
- Yard number: 448
- Launched: 9 June 1891
- Maiden voyage: 25 August 1891
- Identification: Official number 98663
- Fate: Torpedoed and sunk on 5 May 1917

General characteristics
- Class & type: passenger ship
- Tonnage: 5,324 GRT
- Length: 420.0 ft (128.0 m)
- Beam: 48.2 ft (14.7 m)
- Depth: 30.6 ft (9.3 m)
- Installed power: 627 NHP
- Propulsion: 1 screw, quadruple-expansion steam engine
- Speed: 14 knots (26 km/h)
- Capacity: 80 first class; 1,000 third class
- Notes: Sister ships: Jumna and Jelunga

Avoca was a steamship that entered service in 1891, which belonged to a total of seven shipping companies during its 26 years of service, including the British Cunard Line in 1916, which used it as a passenger and cargo ship in the North Atlantic. On 5 May 1917, the ship was sunk by the German submarine UC-48 off the southern coast of Ireland.

== History ==
=== Construction and early career ===
The 5,324 GRT steamship was built at the William Denny and Brothers shipyard in the Scottish port city of Dumbarton for the British India Associated Steamers and launched on 9 June 1891, under the name Avoca. The vessel was the last of three sister ships to be completed. The other two were Jumna (1886) and Jelunga (1890). Avoca could carry 80 passengers in first class and 1,000 in third class. On 25 August 1891, Avoca embarked on its maiden voyage via Calcutta to Brisbane, operating for the Queensland Royal Mail Service.

The 420 ft (130 m) and 48 ft (15 m) wide ship had one funnel, three masts, and a single propeller, and was schooner-rigged. It was powered by quadruple-expansion steam engine that was rated at 666 nominal horsepower and could achieve a top speed of 14 kn (26 km/h; 16 mph).

In 1896, Avoca was temporarily chartered to the Spanish shipping company Compañía Transatlántica Española (CTE), known in English as the Spanish Line. For this company, the ship sailed under the name San Fernando between Central America and Cuba, primarily transporting troops. Toward the end of that year, the vessel was returned to British India and, under its original name, resumed service to Australia. In 1899 and 1900, Avoca completed a total of four troop voyages between India and South Africa during the Second Boer War. This was followed by a fifth voyage as a hospital ship. In 1903, it was sold to British India Steam Navigation Company.

=== Later years ===
In 1907, the ship was sold to the Danish shipping company East Asiatic Company, for whom it served as Atlanta. During this time, it served as a royal yacht for a visit by the Danish royal couple to Greenland. The following year, the ship was transferred to the New York & Continental Line, which reverted to its original name, Avoca. On 1 April 1908, Avoca set sail on its maiden voyage along the Hamburg–Rotterdam–Halifax–New York route. In July 1908, with 300 passengers on board, it collided with an anchored German steamer while entering Hoek van Holland, Netherlands. As a result, the New York & Continental Line went bankrupt, and the ship was auctioned off to C. G. Ashdown for £15,000.

Two months later, it was sold to the North West Transport Line for £35,000, which renamed it Uranium. However, the steamer was in poor condition and was only used for emigrant transport. On 3 April 1909, Uranium resumed service between Rotterdam and New York. By 9 April 1910, it had completed nine transatlantic crossings on this route. That same year, the vessel was sold to the Uranium Steamship Company, which retained the name Uranium and operated the ship on the same route. On 4 June 1910, Uranium set sail on its first voyage for its new owners.

On 12 January 1913, the steamer ran aground in dense fog near Halifax while attempting to assist the Allan Line's Carthiginian, which was ablaze. The ship was salvaged, repaired, and returned to service. On 23 July 1914, Uranium departed on its final voyage for the Uranium Steamship Company.

=== Cunard Line ownership ===
In May 1916, the ship was acquired by the British shipping company Cunard Line, which took over the Uranium Steamship Company's fleet to offset wartime losses. At this time, the ship was renamed Feltria. From November 1916, the ship operated passenger and freight services between Avonmouth and New York. However, its time with the company was short lived.

== Sinking ==
On the night of 5 May 1917, at 7:30pm Feltria was sailing through bad weather in the Celtic Sea while sailing to Avonmouth carrying general cargo and a crew of 69 when she was torpedoed by UC-48 without warning about eight miles (13 km) southeast of Mine Head off the Irish coast. Due to the conditions that night, launching the lifeboats was not easy. The No.1 boat capsized while being launched and the No.4 boat had been destroyed by the torpedo explosion. Boats 2, 3, 5, and 6 successfully got away before Feltria slipped beneath the waves. After Feltria sank, the submarine surfaced alongside lifeboat No.6 and asked the chief officer about what cargo they were carrying and as the submarine sailed away, they picked up one of the engineers from the water and returned with him to the lifeboats. During the night, three members of the crew died in No.6 boat due to exposure and lifeboat No.2, containing her captain, Walter Price, and the chief steward, disappeared. The survivors were rescued by SS Ridley and landed at Barrow. Out of the crew of 69, 45 were killed in the sinking.
