= SS Servia =

British liner

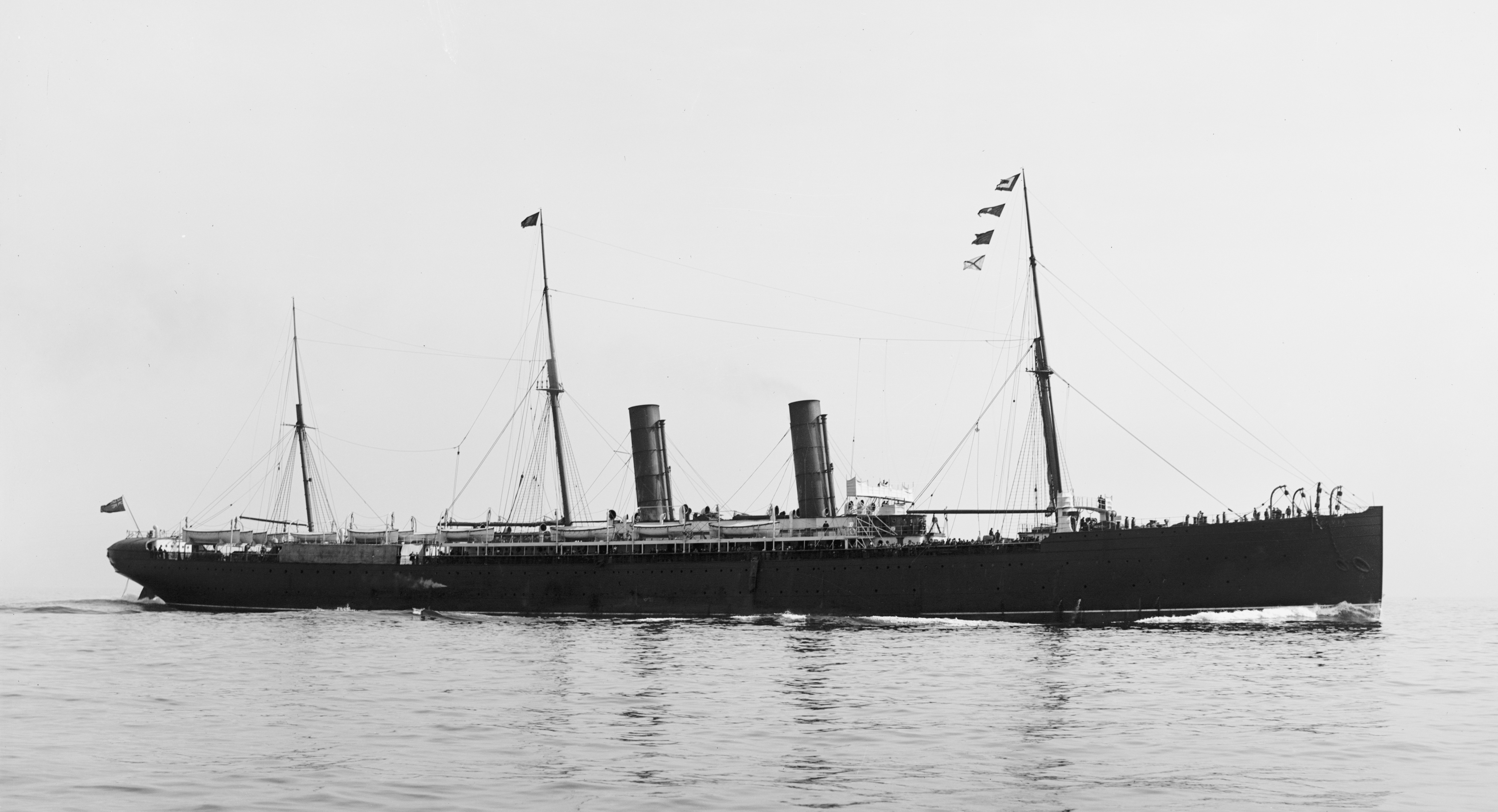

History

United Kingdom
- Name: SS Servia
- Namesake: Servia, Greece
- Owner: Cunard Line
- Operator: Cunard Line
- Port of registry: United Kingdom, Liverpool
- Route: Liverpool – New York
- Builder: J & G Thomson
- Cost: £256,903
- Yard number: 179
- Launched: 1 March 1881
- Maiden voyage: November 26, 1881
- Home port: Liverpool
- Fate: Broken up in 1902

General characteristics
- Type: Ocean liner
- Tonnage: 7,392 GRT
- Length: 515 ft (157 m)
- Beam: 52.1 ft (15.9 m)
- Draft: 40.75 ft (12.42 m)
- Decks: 5
- Installed power: 10,300 ihp
- Propulsion: Single Screw
- Sail plan: Barque-rigged
- Speed: 16.7 kn (best average)
- Capacity: 480 1st class, 750 steerage
- Crew: 298

SS Servia, also known as RMS Servia, was a successful transatlantic passenger and mail steamer of revolutionary design, built by J & G Thomson of Clydebank (later John Brown & Company) and launched in 1881. She was the first large ocean liner to be built of steel instead of iron, and the first Cunard ship to have an electric lighting installation.

== Background ==
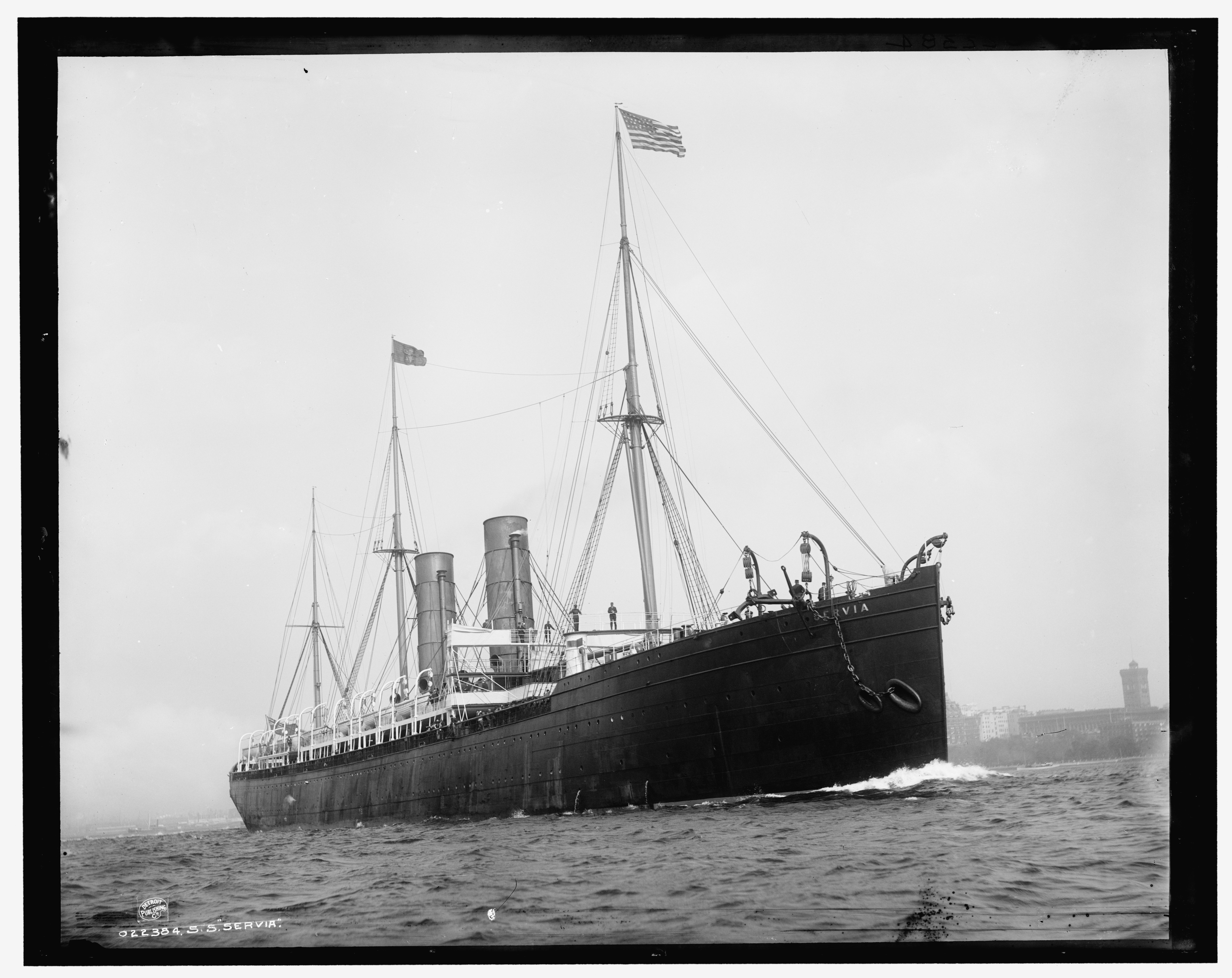
Servia underway

In 1878, Samuel Cunard's British and North American Royal Mail Steam Packet Company was reorganised into a limited company and officially named Cunard. This capitalisation allowed it to use shareholder money to build larger, more expensive ships. A new policy to this end was put into effect by Cunard's new chairman, John Burns, and announced in the London Times.

Launched on 1 March 1881, Servia was the first of Cunard's new breed of ocean liners. She was the third largest ship in the world at 515 feet long and 52.1 feet wide, surpassed only by Brunel's SS Great Eastern and Inman Line's SS City of Rome. With her design and construction guided by Admiralty specifications, Servia had many features that satisfied the requirements for her to be placed high on the Admiralty's reserve list of armed auxiliary cruisers, where she could be called into service in times of war. She was named after the historic English name for the country Serbia.

== Power plant ==
Servia's engine was similar to the one installed on the Guion Line's crack passenger liner SS Alaska of 1881. It was a triple-crank compound steam engine with one 72-inch high-pressure cylinder, and two 100-inch low-pressure cylinders, and a stroke of 6.5 ft (2.0 m). The steam was supplied at 90 lbf by seven Scotch boilers, each of which were 18 ft (5.5 m) in diameter and contained six furnaces. Six of these boilers were double-ended, while the seventh was single-ended and contained three furnaces. The power developed was 10,300 ihp, driving a single four-bladed screw. Servia's maximum recorded speed during her trials was 17.85 knots, and her average speed during a crossing was around 16 knots. Although Servia did not achieve any speed records, she was a competitive liner that performed well, and in 1884 she managed to make a crossing in less than seven days, averaging at 16.7 knots.

== Notable features ==
Servia differed from earlier Atlantic liners in a number of significant ways, but most notably, she was the first liner to specialise in passenger transportation, due to her cargo space being sacrificed for her large power-plant. This sacrifice was viable because at that time, tramp steamers had taken over much of the freight across the Atlantic, while the demand for passenger transportation had increased. Because of her passenger specialisation, Servia is considered to be first liner of what became known as the Express Transatlantic Service. Servia also had a number of innovative technical features which are noteworthy in the history of ocean-going liners. The following list is a summary of those features:

=== Construction and design ===
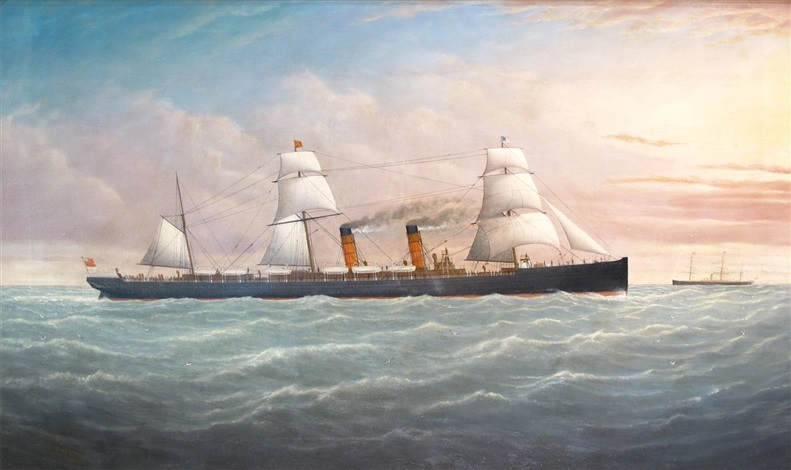
Servia, 1881, by Joseph Witham

Servia was the first major ocean liner to be built of steel, which gave her large hull the advantage of additional strength while at the same time making her lighter. She was also the first liner to re-introduce the cellular double-bottom design which Brunel had invented 20 years earlier for the Great Eastern. The double-bottom was 4 ft 8 in deep, and could be flooded with 800 tons of water ballast. Because Servia was built to Admiralty specifications, she incorporated several safety features, the most notable being the sub-division of her hull into 12 transverse water-tight compartments, fitted with water-tight doors. She could remain afloat with any two of these compartments flooded. The water-tight doors between the boiler and engine room were fail-safe and could be closed from any deck.

=== Electric lighting ===
The first application of electrical lighting on a passenger ship occurred around 1879, with the installation of a small but practical electric lighting installation had been made on the Inman liner City of Berlin. However, a larger more extensive installation aboard the American coastal liner Columbia performed by Thomas Edison the following year, became the first commercial and practical application of electric lighting at sea. Where City of Berlin had a total of six incandescent lamps installed within the dining hall, boiler rooms and engine room, the installation aboard the Columbia consisted of 200 incandescent lamps fitted within the main saloon and 120 first class staterooms. The Columbia's installation included a small number of extra lamps within the engine room as well.

Upon her completion in 1881, the Servia became the first Cunarder to introduce electric lighting, using incandescent lamps. Much like the previous installations aboard the Columbia and City of Berlin, the lamps were installed in the public rooms and engineering spaces aboard the Servia. In total, the Servia utilized a total of 119 incandescent bulbs, which consisted of 117 Swan lamps and two arc lamps. The installation also included a Siemens built dynamo which fed direct current electricity to an electromagnetic inverter operating at 650 revolutions per minute. Both the dynamo and inverter were located in a secluded area of the Servia's engine room. The inverter in turn supplied alternating current electricity directly to the incandescent lamps through four independent circuits. The majority of lamps were located in the saloon, ladies' room, the boiler rooms, the engine room and smoke room among other areas of the ship. Two lamps were also utilized on deck to aid the loading and unloading of cargo from the vessel. Installation of the electrical lighting system was performed by the Edison and Swan Electric Light Company. In addition to the incandescent lamps, Servia was also fitted with a new type of compass and deep-sea sounding device.

=== Passenger accommodation ===
Servia had public rooms of a scale and luxury greater than previously known. Of the three decks, the upper deck consisted of deck-houses that included a first-class smoking room, and a luxuriously fitted ladies drawing room and a music room. The entrance and grand staircase was the largest that had ever appeared on a liner, and was paneled in polished maple and ash. It led down to the landing on the main deck which featured a library. Twenty-four first-class staterooms were situated aft of this landing, while the first-class dining salon was situated forward. The dining salon could sit 220 of Servia's 480 first-class passengers on five long tables, and was richly decorated with carved panels and carpets. In the center was an open well that rose 17 ft to a skylight. Forward of the dining salon were a further 58 staterooms, followed by crew accommodation areas.

On the lower deck was a servants dining room and a further 82 first-class staterooms. The forward section of this deck was reserved for 730 steerage passengers. This section was a large area of about 150 feet long, and included a dining area. The berths were grouped into separate male and female areas.

== Fate ==
With the introduction of newer and larger Cunard liners RMS Campania and RMS Lucania in 1893, Servia was relegated to intermediate service, later used to transport troops to South Africa during the Boer war. She was broken up in 1902 by Thos. W. Ward.

== Notable passengers ==
Writers Jane Addams and Henry James both sailed on a crossing aboard Servia in August 1883, though it does not appear they met. Edward Pellew, 4th Viscount Exmouth, and Lady Edith Viscountess Exmouth sailed aboard the Servia leaving New York City for Liverpool on 1 October 1884. British novelist Thomas Hughes (Tom Brown's Schooldays) was on board on 6 October 1884 when he signed an autograph for another passenger & remarked about rough seas. [12]

Industrialist Andrew Carnegie with philosopher Herbert Spencer and his friend Mr. Lott were fellow travelers on the Servia from Liverpool to New York in 1882

== See also ==
- List of Cunard Line ships
