= SS Thracia =

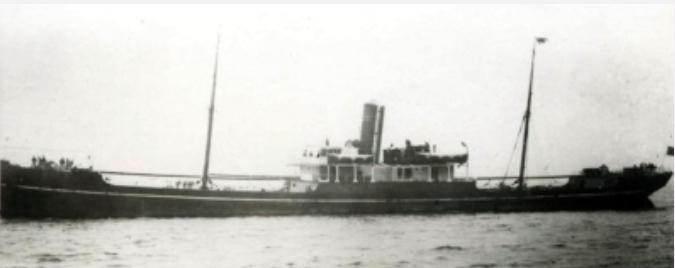
- Orono departing port, 12 July 1902

History

United Kingdom
- Name: Orono (1898–1909); Thracia (1909–1917)
- Namesake: Thracia
- Owner: Plate Steamship Company (1898–1909); Cunard Line (1909–1917)
- Operator: Plate Steamship Company (1898–1909); Cunard Line (1909–1917)
- Port of registry: Rochester (1898–1909); Liverpool (1909–1917)
- Route: Mediterranean (1909–1917)
- Builder: Sir Raylton Dixon & Co
- Yard number: 459
- Launched: 30 August 1898
- Completed: November 1898
- Maiden voyage: 1898
- Identification: Official number 109921
- Fate: Torpedoed and sunk on 27 March 1917

General characteristics
- Class & type: Oceano-class cargo ship
- Tonnage: 2,891 GRT
- Length: 310 ft (94 m)
- Beam: 43.9 ft (13.4 m)
- Depth: 15.7 ft (4.8 m)
- Installed power: 258 NHP
- Speed: 10 knots (19 km/h)
- Crew: 38
- Notes: Sister ship: SS Oceano

SS Thracia was a British cargo ship launched as Clarence and completed as Orono in 1898 at Middlesbrough for the Plate Steamship Company. In 1909 she was sold and renamed Thracia and in 1917 she was torpedoed and sunk by SM UC-69.

== Building and registration ==
The Orono and her sister ship, the Oceano, were built by the Sir Raylton Dixon & Co. shipyard at Middlesbrough, United Kingdom. Orono was launched on 30 August 1898 and completed that November. Orono had a registered length of 310 ft (94 m) and her beam was 43.9 ft (13.4 m). Her measured tonnage was 2,891 gross register tons (GRT). The ship's engines were rated at 258 nominal horsepower and gave her a speed of about 10 knots (19 km/h; 12 mph).

== Early years ==
Orono's maiden voyage was in 1898 and it was uneventful crossing, in March 1903 while leaving New York she collided with an American schooner. Orono would be repaired and put back into service, She continued service with the Plate Steamship Company until 1909. When she and her sister ship were sold to the Cunard Line, which renamed them Thracia and Lycia respectively. The former Orono continued to deliver cargo on Cunard's Mediterranean route until 1914.

== First World War and sinking ==
With the outbreak of the First World War in 1914. Thracia was used to deliver cargo for the war effort. She was given a Vickers machine gun at her stern. The cargo ship sailed without incident until March 1917. While sailing in a convoy from Bilbao to Glasgow with a cargo of iron ore, the vessel was torpedoed by the German U-boat UC-69 on the night of 27 March 1917. Thracia quickly sank with the loss of 36 lives, while only two men survived. One was picked up by a French fishing boat and the other by the Norwegian steamer Nordborg.

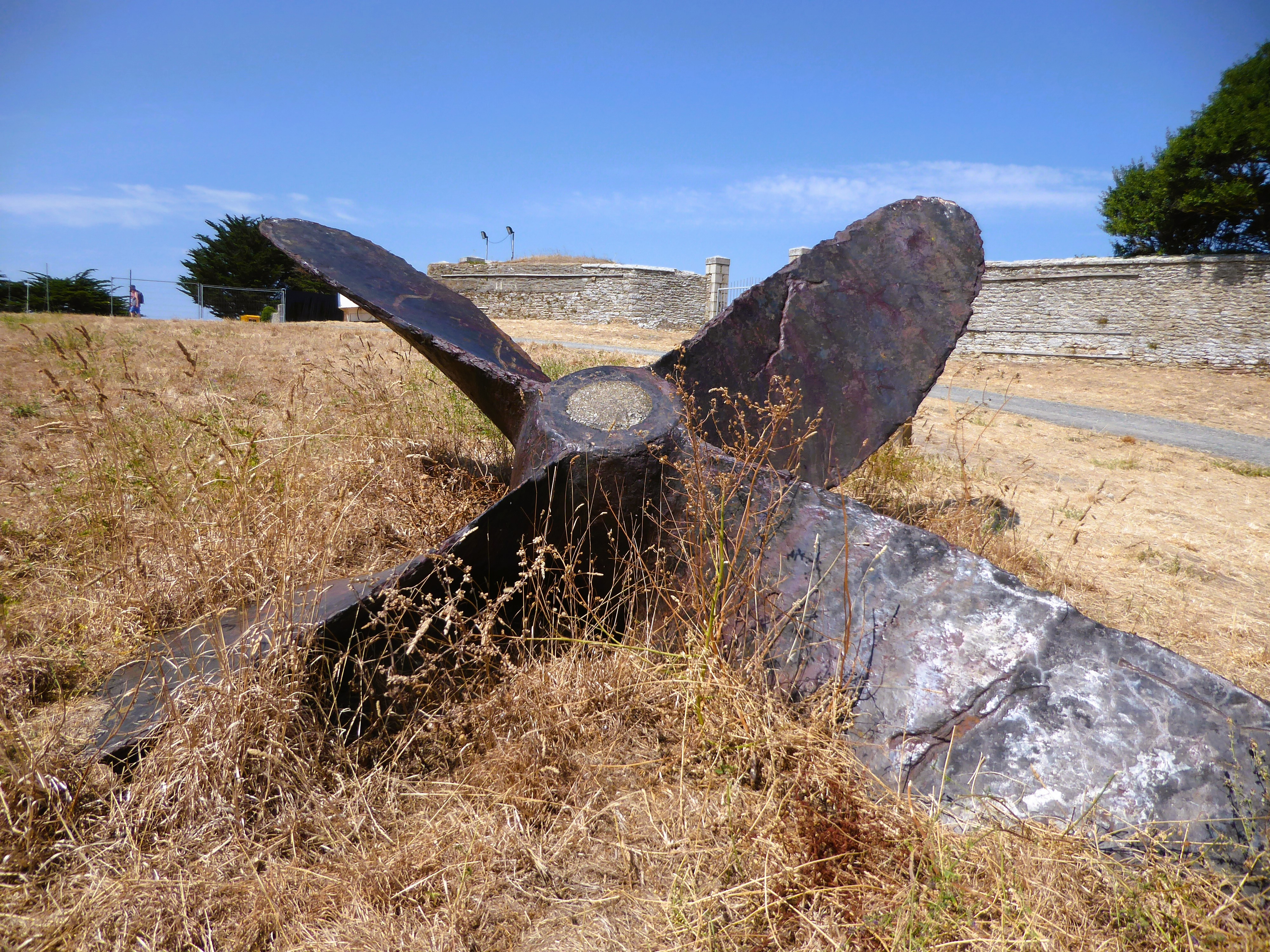
Thracia's propeller (4,800 kg) near Port-Haliguen, Quiberon.

== Wreckage ==
The wreck of Thracia lies off the coast of France. The wreck was located after the war by a salvage company for scrap metal using explosives, destroying much of the ship. Her wreck was mostly forgotten until being rediscovered by a French diver. The wreck is in bad shape. It is badly broken up and is mainly just a confusing tangle of beams and plates. One of the most distinctive features of the wreck is the two large boilers that lie side by side. Her Vickers machine gun is on display at the Musee de Quiberon.
