= RMS Albania =

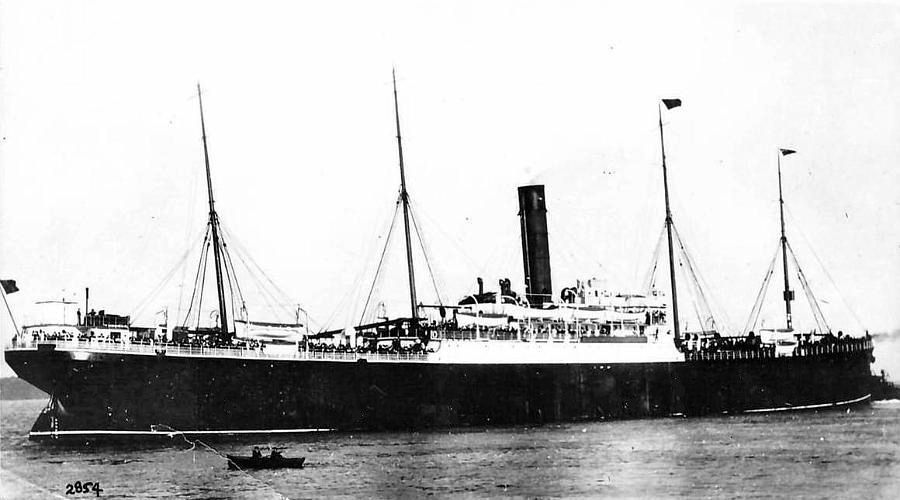
- Cunard ship Albania, built 1900

History
- Name: 1900: Consuelo; 1909: Cairnrona; 1911: Albania; 1912: Poleric
- Operator: 1909–1911: Thomson Line; 1911–1912: Cunard Line; 1912–1929: Bank Line of Glasgow
- Port of registry: Liverpool, (United Kingdom)
- Builder: C S Swan & Hunter, Wallsend-on-Tyne
- Launched: 3 February 1900
- Maiden voyage: 17 September 1901
- Fate: Scrapped in 1930

General characteristics
- Type: Ocean liner
- Tonnage: 7,640 GRT
- Length: 461.5 ft (140.7 m)
- Beam: 52.1 ft (15.9 m)
- Propulsion: Twin propeller powered by six-cylinder turbines by T Richardson & Sons, Hartlepool
- Speed: 11 knots (20 km/h)
- Capacity: 50 2nd class; 800 3rd class

RMS Albania was a steamship that served various owners. She was launched on 3 February 1900 by Swan, Hunter & Wigham Richardson, Wallsend-on-Tyne as Consuelo for Thomas Wilson & Sons of Hull. She was sold in 1909 to Thomson Line and renamed Cairnrona. In 1912, the vessel was renamed Poleric and remained in service until 1929 and sold for scrap in 1930.

== Cunard Line ownership ==
She was sold by Thomson Line in 1911 to Cunard Line and renamed Albania, along with Ausonia and Ascania. These three ships were designed to sail on the Southampton–Halifax route and were also the first Cunard ocean liners to sail from Southampton.

On 2 May 1911, the Albania pioneered Cunard's new route and on 16 May, she was followed by Ausonia and Ascania on 23 May. Albania became the first Cunard Line vessel to sail the St. Lawrence River to Montreal, which became a familiar destination for the company. When the St. Lawrence River was closed due to sea ice during the winter months, the western terminus of the route was changed to Portland, Maine. Within six months of her purchase, the Albania was determined to be a losing proposition for the company and she was listed for sale.

== Bank Line ownership ==
On 12 June 1912 she was purchased by the Bank Line of Glasgow for £20,000 and she was renamed Poleric. She remained in service with the Bank Line until 1929 and she was scrapped in 1930.
