= Second class =

Second class generally indicates a secondary level of service or importance. More specific, it may refer to:

- Second Class, a rank in Boy Scouts of America
- Second-class citizen
- 2.-class torpedo boat, Scandinavian ships
- Second class honours, ranking second in a hierarchy of honours
- Second class, a subdivision of military ranks
- Second-class carriage in a railway train

== See also ==
- No.2-class escort ship
