= SS Jackal (1852) =

1852 tender ship

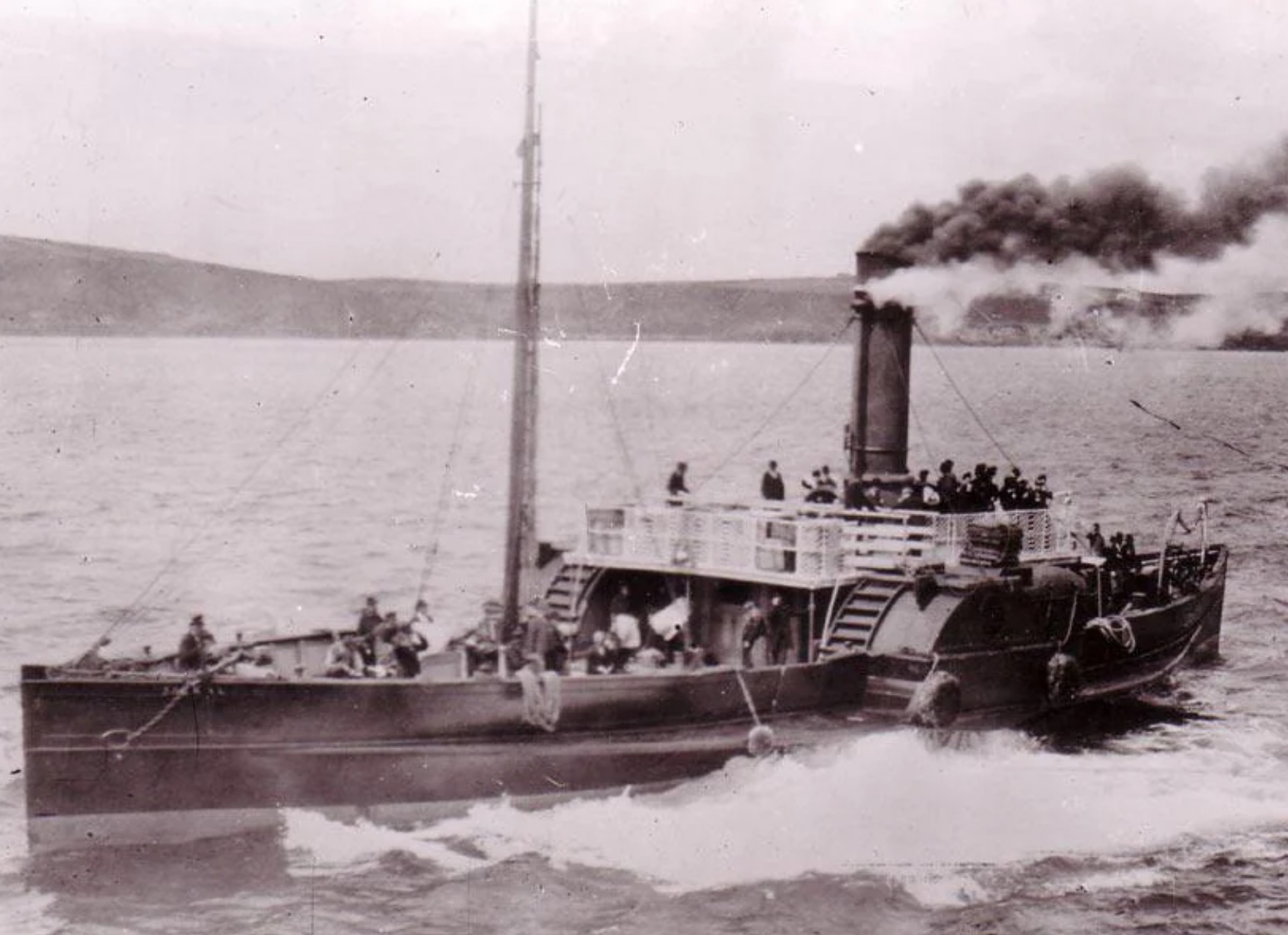

History

United Kingdom
- Name: Jackal
- Owner: Cunard Line (1852–1893)
- Operator: Cunard Line (1852–1893)
- Port of registry: Glasgow (1853-1887); Liverpool (1887-1893)
- Ordered: 1851
- Builder: J. & G. Thompson & Co. , Govan
- Yard number: 1
- Laid down: 22 December 1851
- Launched: 19 March 1852
- Completed: 15 August 1853
- Acquired: 17 April 1852
- In service: May 1852
- Out of service: 1893
- Identification: United Kingdom Official Number 1334
- Fate: Scrapped 1893
- Notes: First Queenstown tender for Cunard

General characteristics
- Type: Ship's tender
- Tonnage: 181 GRT, 111 NRT
- Length: 125.5 ft (38.3 m)
- Beam: 19.5 ft (5.9 m)
- Depth: 9.8 ft (3.0 m)
- Installed power: 80 hp (60 kW)
- Propulsion: Oscillating steam engine, side paddles
- Sail plan: Schooner rig
- Speed: 8 knots (15 km/h; 9.2 mph)

SS Jackal was a tender owned by Cunard Line, operated on the River Mersey between 1852 and 1860, before moving to tendering duties off Queenstown from June 1860 until her withdrawal from service in 1893.

== Design and Early Career ==
The Jackal was launched on 19 March 1852, and her design was rather unique. Rather than most ships with a bow and stern, the Jackal was double-ended, having two bows, two masts, and no bowsprit. This eliminated the need to turn around to navigate in the Mersey, which was beneficial for the busy river. Jackal was propelled by two paddle wheels, driven by an oscilating steam engine, powered by a singular boiler. As the ship was double-ended, both ends of her had a rudder, of Laird's patent for easy handling.

Following her launch in March 1852, the Jackal was eventually towed to Liverpool in April by the tug Helen Faucit. Despite being designed as a paddle steamer, the ship did not have her machinery fitted at first, and instead was used to carry fresh water to the Cunard line ships, being towed by the SS Satellite.

Over a year after coming into service, the Jackal was finally fitted with her steam engine and boiler in August 1853, and she was officially registered to the port of Glasgow.

Not long into entering service as a passenger-carrying steam tender, Jackal was involved with her first incident. On 21 November 1853, a seaman aboard the RMS Niagara of the Cunard Line fell from the mainmast and was rushed aboard the Jackal to be hospitalised, though he passed away a few hours later from his injuries. During the Crimean War from 1854 to 1856, the Jackal was used to ferry soldiers to troop ships in the Mersey on occasion with the Satellite and other barges of the company, though she still continued to serve the Cunard fleet too.

== Early Career in Queenstown ==
In June 1860, the Cunard Line purchased Fitzpatrick's Quay in Queenstown, Ireland, and decided to despatch the Jackal to begin tender services from this quayside where she would carry the passengers and mails from the liners to the harbour. Despite her service in Queenstown, she also returned to Liverpool for the summer season of 1861 before going back to Ireland later that year.

In September 1861, the SS Great Eastern was significantly damaged and limped off Queenstown, where many ships stayed close by to assist her, including the Jackal.

Jackal was involved in a collision with the Inman Liner City of Brussels while tendering to the Olympus in the morning of 24 April 1874. The Inman liner went into full astern, but struck the Jackal on her starboard side, destroying her after deckhouses and badly damaging the hull. Despite this, the Olympus and the City of Brussels continued on with their voyages, and the Jackal was quickly repaired.

In June 1876, the Jackal saw a thief try to flee Britain but he was caught and arrested on the tender, where he was sent back to England for his new trial.

Later that year, the aging ship was reboilered and overhauled at Liverpool. During this time on 4 October, a looking glass from aboard the tender was stolen, and the man was convicted to do hard labour for a month. She returned back to Queenstown to resume service on the evening of 7 November 1876.

In early February of 1880, the Jackal was nearly sunk in a collision when a Government owned vessel, believed to be the Amelia, almost ran down the tender. The crew ordered Jackal to go full astern, and she just barely avoided being run down.

Just two months later, the Jackal yet again was involved in an incident. A fisherman on a pier in Queenstown fell into the water, and the crew immediately sprung into action to help save the man. Unfortunately, the bad weather and poor visibility meant he could not be saved in time, but his body was recovered soon after.

On 28 November 1881, yet another prisoner boarded the Jackal at Queenstown planning to sail on the RMS Scythia. He was detained while aboard her, and attempted to take his own life but failed, and was put back on trial.

Just under three years later in November 1884, a passenger from aboard the RMS Samaria boarded the tender, when she suddenly died moments later. The Samaria's doctor attended the woman, but nothing could be done.

As the size of the newer ships continued to grow, the Jackal was getting rather outdated but was still being used in active service, and on 25 March 1885 steamed as far as Daunt's Rock in an attempt to watch the new RMS Etruria on her sea trials. Unfortunately, the fog was too thick and after several hours she went back to Queenstown.

During the evening of 8 August 1885, a terrible gale had struck Queenstown, which endangered many boats. The crew of the Jackal saw an 18-foot (5.5m) pleasure boat in trouble, and came to the aid of it.

The Cunard liner Cephalonia suffered a propeller shaft failure in January 1886 and although not intending to call to Queenstown, she requested assistance and was towed into the port by the tugs Mount Etna and Lord Bandon, and was assisted by the Jackal as well, further showing her reliability despite now being 34 years old.

Later that year in May, the Cephalonia again had an interesting encounter with the Jackal. Loaded with over 300 passengers for the large liner, the Cunarder departed Queenstown, but thick fog began to set in. After hours of searching for each other, the tender went back to Queenstown still carrying the passengers. After four hours, the fog began to clear and the tender was able to fulfil her duties after significant delay.

== Later Career and Retirement ==
Ten years after her first reboilering and overhaul, it was decided to send the Jackal back to Liverpool for further modernisation and repairs. She returned to service in February 1887 now being registered at the port of Liverpool instead of Glasgow, and she returned in service just in time for the renewal of the Royal Mail contract.

Another strange death occurred aboard the Jackal on 14 May 1888. A passenger from aboard the RMS Bothnia had felt ill but refused to be seen by the doctor, and boarded the tender to disembark at Queenstown. However, shortly after Jackal left the liner, Miss Griffin suddenly fell into a worse condition before passing away on board.

Despite her old age, the Cunard Line still held celebrations aboard her on 4 July 1890, decorating both their Queenstown offices as well as the Jackal herself.

In July 1892, the Inman liner RMS City of Chicago wrecked off Kinsale, and the Cunard Line despatched the Jackal to come and rescue some of the survivors from the lifeboats.

The bad luck of the iron paddle steamship came back to haunt her again, as a passenger aboard the RMS Umbria suddenly died from heart disease while the Umbria was starting to offload passengers onto the Jackal in September 1892, and just over a month later, a Cunard master-at-arms fell overboard the RMS Etruria while removing the rails from the gangway between the liner and the Jackal. He was injured from his fall, and drowned in the violent seas.

Now approaching 41 years old, the Cunard Line finally made the decision to put the old Jackal up for sale on 5 January 1893, much to the dismay of many who grew fond of the small old ship. She was retained at Queenstown until March, but the Cunard Company formed a contract to use the Ireland and America to replace the outdated and inefficient tender.

Jackal arrived at Liverpool for the last time in April 1893 and was put back up for sale on 10 July that same year after a brief layup in Liverpool. She was eventually broken up.

== See also ==
- SS Satellite
- SS Skirmisher
