= Harold Lowe =

Fifth officer of RMS Titanic (1882–1944)

Commander Harold Lowe RD RNR
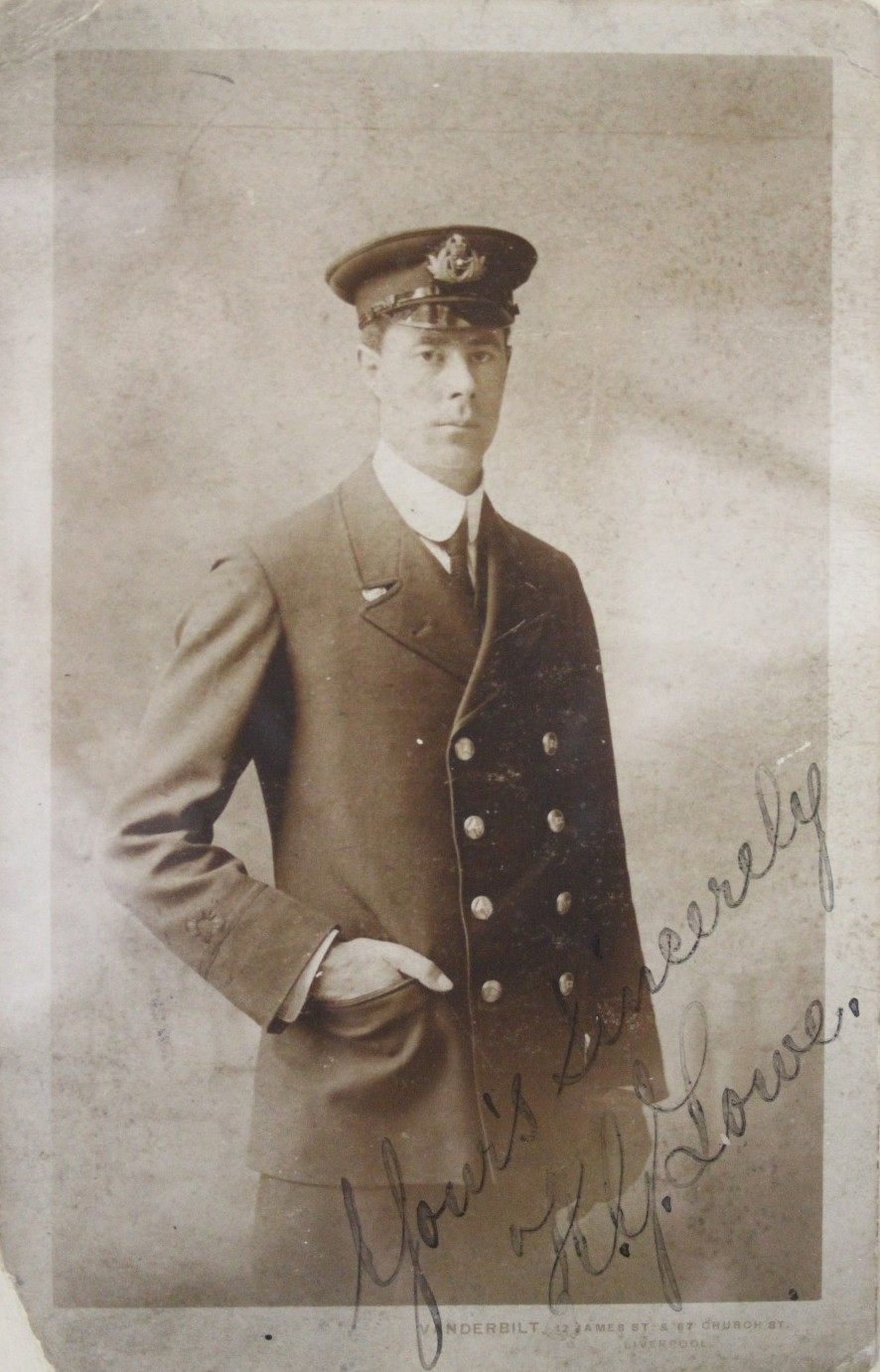
- Studio photo of Lowe, c. 1911, after joining the White Star Line
- Born: 21 November 1882; Eglwys Rhos, Carnarvonshire, Wales
- Died: 12 May 1944 (aged 61); Deganwy, Caernarvonshire, Wales
- Resting place: Llandrillo-yn-Rhos Churchyard, Rhos-on-Sea, Conwy County Borough, Wales
- Occupations: Merchant mariner; Naval officer
- Known for: Fifth officer on RMS Titanic
- Spouse: Ellen Marion Whitehouse (m. 1913)
- Children: 2
- Military career
- Allegiance: United Kingdom
- Branch: Royal Naval Reserve
- Service years: 1904–1927
- Rank: Commander
- Conflicts: World War I: Atlantic U-boat campaign; Siberian intervention
- Awards: Victory Medal; 1914–15 Star; Reserve Decoration

Commander Harold Godfrey Lowe RD RNR (21 November 1882 – 12 May 1944) was a British merchant mariner and naval officer who served as the fifth officer aboard the RMS Titanic during its ill-fated maiden voyage, and the most junior of the four ship's officers who survived the disaster.

In charge of lifeboat No. 14, Lowe received praise for his conduct during the sinking and for returning to the wreck site after the ship sank in search for survivors, the only boat which voluntarily returned. Along with a volunteer crew, he rescued four survivors from the water and at least twelve others from the swamped Collapsible Boat A, and took them to safety aboard RMS Carpathia. Lowe went on to participate in both inquiries into the disaster.

Lowe went on to serve in the merchant naval service until retiring from seafaring in 1931. He served in the Royal Naval Reserve during World War I and, despite his failing health, as an air raid warden in World War II. In retirement, he entered local politics as a councillor in Deganwy, Wales. In 1944, he became the first surviving officer of Titanic to die, following two years of ill-health after a stroke.

== Early life ==
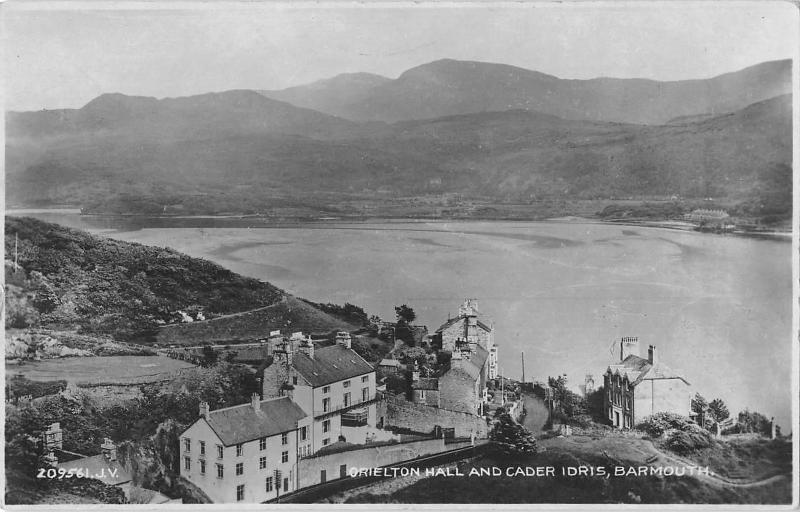
Penrallt House, Barmouth (far right), c. 1900s, when the Lowe family lived there.

Lowe was born in Eglwys Rhos, Carnarvonshire, Wales, on 21 November 1882, in his paternal grandfather's home Bryn Lupus. He was the third of seven children born to Emma Harriet (née Quick) and George Edward Lowe. Though he spent most of his shore life in North Wales, Lowe was mostly English by ancestry; his father was from Chester, born to a family of prominent jewellers who owned the firm Lowe & Sons, and his mother was born in Liverpool, the daughter of a police superintendent. Lowe learned to speak Welsh fluently, and identified as Anglo-Welsh.

The family moved around North Wales for a time and eventually settled in the seaside town of Barmouth, Merionethshire, in 1891. He and his siblings lived in Penrallt – Welsh for "House on the Slope". In Barmouth, Lowe and his brothers became enthusiastic boatsmen; the eldest brother, George Jr., worked as boatman and took people across the river in his boat, with his younger brothers often coming along. They were also choir boys at St. David's Anglican Church and participated in charity fundraisers as the "Penrallt Boys".

Lowe's father George, who was a painter, gained a reputation in Barmouth for being a drunk; Harold's son later said that George Sr. was "fond of the bottle," and one of his brothers later turned to alcoholism as well. This very likely influenced Lowe to refrain from alcohol completely, once saying, "I am not a teetotaller, I am a total abstainer." Lowe's mother Harriet ran Penrallt as a private hotel to support the family.

When Lowe was 13, his older brother George Jr. died in a boating accident, aged 17. George had gone out and subsequently disappeared. His body was later found floating in Aberamffra Bay; it is speculated that he went to secure the punt he often sailed in and accidentally fell into the water, could not swim, and subsequently drowned. Lowe himself had a similar accident a year later; he took his father's punt out on the Aberamffra Bay during bad weather and it capsized. However, unlike his brother, Lowe could swim and managed to make his way back to shore.

== Maritime career beginnings ==
=== Career in sail ===
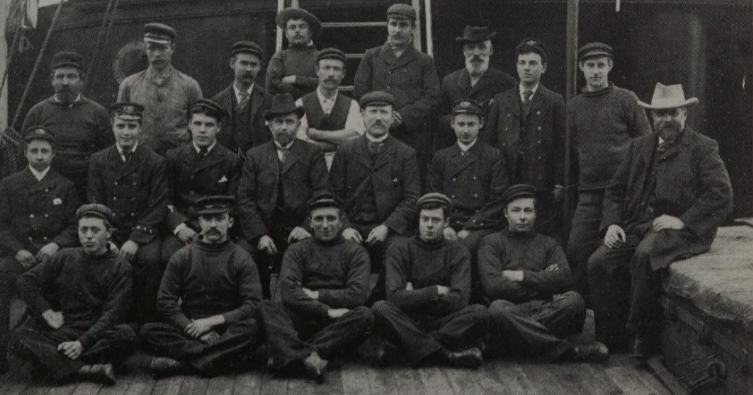
Crew of the Ormsary in Newcastle, Australia, 1903. Lowe is seated in the front row, second from right

After the death of his brother, Lowe became the eldest son in the family. His father, in turn, had ambitions for him to be apprenticed to a Liverpool businessman and had him transferred to Barmouth County Intermediate School in preparation for that career path. However, Lowe was determined to go to sea and wanted to be paid for his work, explaining later on, "I was not going to work for anybody for nothing." As a result, he ran away from his home around the age of fifteen and began his career at sea as a ship's boy aboard Welsh coastal schooners, likely in Portmadoc. Lowe eventually reconciled with his family as he was using his family home, Penrallt, as his shore address by 1901.

Lowe's earliest known registered vessel was the schooner Excel where he signed on as a cook in November 1899 for one voyage to Poole, Dorset. He would then join the Aeron Lass as an ordinary seaman from December 1899 to April 1900. He went on to serve in the same position aboard the William Keith, from May to October 1900, sailing to Dublin and back, and on the British Queen from January to June 1901.

In June 1901, Lowe joined the Cortez, a square-rigged sailing ship, as an able seaman from June 1901, sailing on it to Chile, as well as rounding Cape Horn; it was his first deep-sea voyage and he was with the ship till April 1902. He joined the Balasore, a four-mast steel barque, with the position of ordinary seaman, sailing to Cape Town and leaving the ship in Antwerp. He was with the ship for eight months, between May 1902 and January 1903. In March 1903, Lowe joined the Ormsary, another four-mast barque, on its maiden voyage as an able seaman, sailing on it to Australia and Hawaii. He was on the ship for over a year, and it would be his last sailing ship; he left the Ormsary in May 1904 and joined the Royal Naval Reserve (RNR) as a rating some time afterwards.

=== Early years in steam ===
Lowe made the transition from sail to steam following his RNR training, joining the Blue Funnel Line which made voyages to the Far East and the west coast of Canada and the United States. His first steamship was the SS Prometheus which he joined as an able seaman in August 1904. In November 1904, he was aboard the ship when it was involved in a collision with the SS Petcan. He was later called to testify in front of a Board of Trade inquiry into the incident.

Lowe later joined the SS Telemachus which notably carried a Chinese crew in addition to the regular British crew. Lowe came to hold his Chinese shipmates in high regard, considering them honest and hard-working sailors. During this time, he risked his own life to save a Chinese sailor who had fallen overboard, by jumping overboard himself and holding the man afloat until help came for both of them. With the Telemachus, Lowe also made his first visit to Canada and the U.S., stopping over in Vancouver, Seattle, and Tacoma.

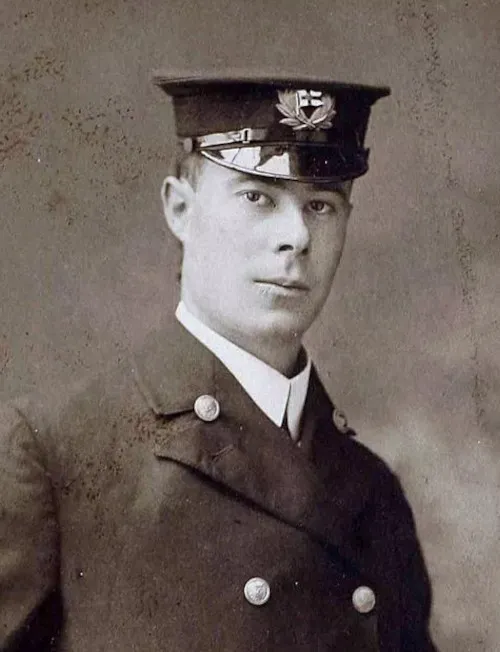
Lowe during his time with the Elder Dempster Line, c. 1909

In January 1906, Lowe failed during his first attempt in gaining his second mate's certificate. Afterwards, he joined the Ellerman Line, sailing aboard the Justin and then the Fabian to Mediterranean ports. He resat for the certificate again in August 1906, passing it on the second try.

Not wanting to return to sea as an able seaman, Lowe held out for a job as an officer, and soon joined the cargo ship SS Ardeola of the Ardeola Steamship Company as its third officer, sailing to the Canary Islands. Having taken what was seen as an unconventional route to becoming a ship's officer, Lowe was considered a hawsepiper; of the Titanic's seven officers, he was the only one not to serve an apprenticeship and the only one who had previously served either as an ordinary seaman or able seaman.

That same year, Lowe joined the Elder Dempster Line, travelling along with West African Coast. His first ship with the line was the SS Charma as fourth officer, before being promoted to third officer aboard the SS Bonny. In 1908, he attained his first mate's certificate on his second attempt and was made second officer for SS Madeira and served in the same role on the SS Oron; during the voyage, he briefly served as Chief Officer. Lowe contracted malaria during this time and, while he survived, it would become a recurring health issue in his later years.

Between March 1908 and June 1909, Lowe took an extended leave from seafaring. This is likely because his mother Harriet had fallen ill following a stroke and died in March 1909. Soon after her death, he would return to sea on the SS Addah, again as second officer. In 1910, he gained his Master's certificate on a second attempt. From December 1910 to March 1911, he would sail on the SS Zaria, his last ship with the Elder Dempster Line.

In April 1911, Lowe joined the White Star Line. His first assignment with the new line would be with the SS Tropic, a cargo ship on the Australian route. Joining the ship as fourth officer, he was promoted to third officer on sailing day after the original third officer was transferred. After one voyage, a few days after returning to Liverpool, he was assigned as third officer of the SS Belgic, a passenger liner on the Australian route making its first voyage as a White Star Liner. During his tenure aboard, there was a mutiny amongst the firemen and the deck crew which forced the Belgic's captain, J. H. Thornton, to issue arrest warrants and later led to a number of crew deserting the ship when it reached Cape Town. Lowe returned to Liverpool aboard the Belgic on 21 February 1912.

== RMS Titanic ==
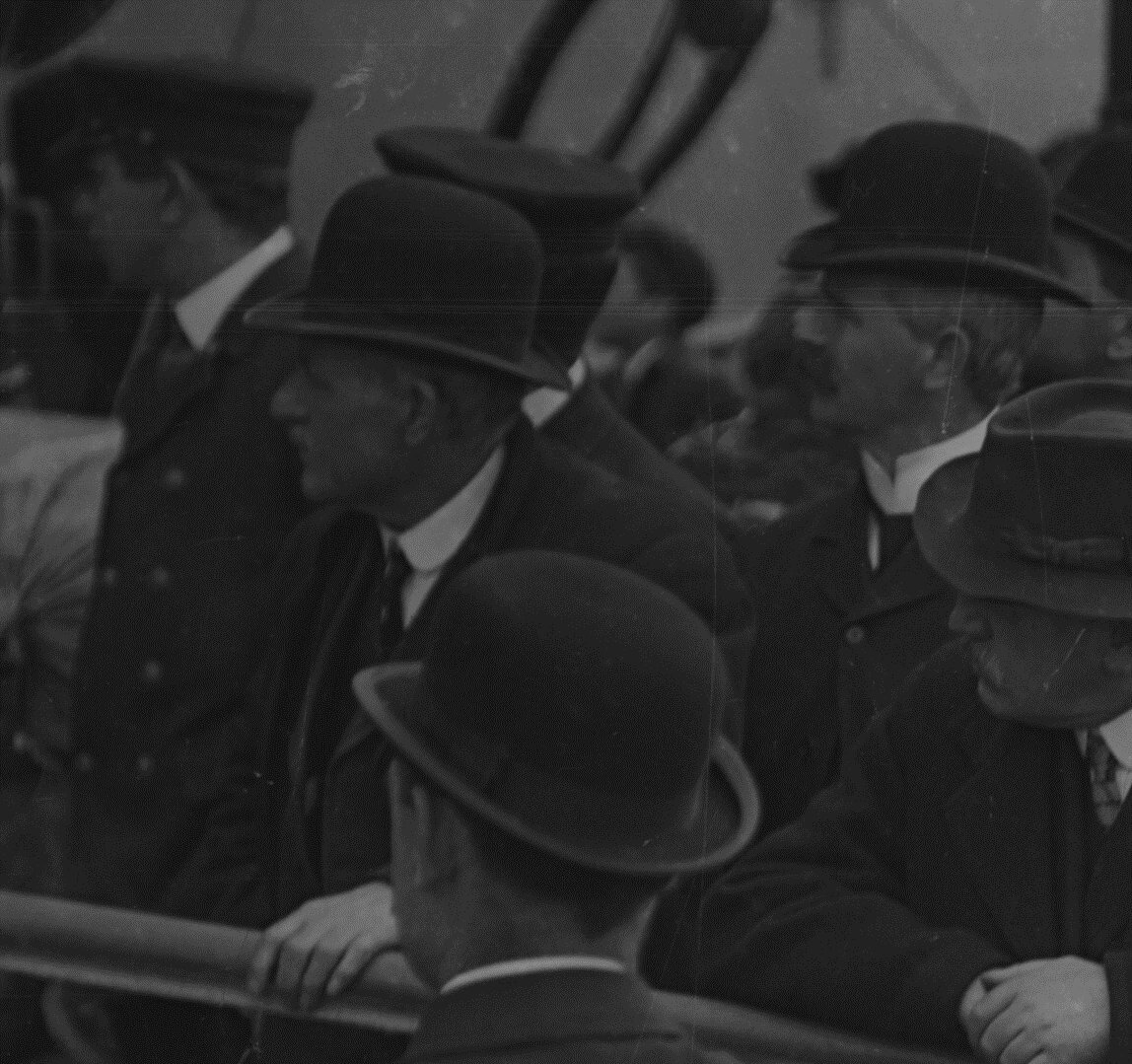
Lowe (far left) on the tender America in Queenstown, 11 April 1912. Standing next to him, partial obscured by a passenger, is likely Third Officer Herbert Pitman, Lowe's watchmate on Titanic.

Historian Inger Sheil notes that Lowe's transfer to the RMS Titanic, the world's largest ocean liner at the time, from small cargo and passenger ships remains "something of a mystery" as, unlike his fellow Titanic officers, he had never served aboard a Royal Mail Ship nor had he any experience of sailing the North Atlantic before. She speculates that Lowe's performance during the difficult voyage aboard the SS Belgic likely impressed company officials and led to him being transferred to serve aboard White Star Line's newest liner.

On 26 March 1912, Lowe reported to White Star's Liverpool offices at nine o'clock in the morning, with orders to join the Titanic. Along with three fellow junior officers, he travelled to Belfast and signed on the ship the following day. Despite his numerous years at sea, the maiden voyage of the Titanic was to be Lowe's first crossing of the North Atlantic. He later described himself as being a "stranger to everyone on board" the ship as he had never worked with the other officers before, and they had all travelled the North Atlantic routes before at least once while he had not.

In Belfast, Lowe and Sixth Officer James Moody were tasked with inspecting the starboard lifeboats and their equipment. On sailing day, 10 April, Lowe and Moody were each put in charge of two starboard lifeboats which were lowered and rowed around the dock to satisfy the Board of Trade officials that Titanic met safety regulations.

White Star operated a watchkeeping system whereby the three senior officers worked the same four-hour watches in every 12-hour period while the junior officers stood the traditional system of four hours on/four hours off with the rest of the Titanic's deck crew. This was divided into two watches, designated Port and Starboard, and pairs of junior officers were assigned to each watch. Lowe was assigned to the Port Watch, standing duties with Third Officer Herbert Pitman.

During the delivery trip from Belfast to Southampton, and then again during departure from Southampton, Lowe's departure position was in the wheelhouse, in charge of the bridge telephones; his duty was relaying messages and commands from the captain and harbour pilot to his fellow officers stationed at their respective departure positions. In Queenstown, Lowe was photographed aboard the tender PS America, alongside another officer (likely his watchmate Pitman), overseeing the off-loading of passengers and sacks of mail.

=== The sinking and evacuation ===
On 14 April 1912, Lowe was relieved at 8:00 PM by Sixth Officer Moody. He was asleep in his quarters when the ship scraped by an iceberg at 11:40 PM, remaining asleep through it as well as Fourth Officer Joseph Boxhall's attempt to awaken him. As he explained later, "We do not have any too much sleep, and therefore when we sleep, we die." Eventually Lowe was awakened by noises outside his cabin and found passengers in the officer's quarters who were wearing lifebelts. He got dressed and headed out on deck where he realised the seriousness of the situation due to the ship being noticeably down by the bow. It is not fully known when he got his personal firearm, described by Lowe as a "Browning Automatic." (Note: Lowe's personal firearm was likely a Browning Model 1910. It was one of the few possessions of Lowe's which he saved as he remarked at the U.S. inquiry he still had it in his possession.) While he implied he took it with him after getting dressed, it is more likely he retrieved it after a few male passengers jumped into a lifeboat as it was being lowered and injured a woman; he was later heard to have said, "I will stop that. I will go down and get my gun."

Lowe first went to Lifeboat No. 7 on the starboard side as it was crowded and began to assist First Officer William Murdoch in filling and lowering it. Lowe then began helping with the lowering lifeboat No. 5 which left at almost around the same time. During this time, White Star Line chairman J. Bruce Ismay came along side, getting "trifle excited" and began telling the crew there to, "Lower away, lower away, lower away!" Lowe, who had personally been handling one of the davit falls to help lower the boat, angrily ordered him away for interfering with his duties: "If you will get to hell out of that I shall be able to do something! Do you want me to lower away quickly? You will have me drown the whole lot of them!"

From No. 5, Lowe proceeded to assist in filling Lifeboat No. 3 and then Emergency Boat No. 1, both under the general supervision of Murdoch. One of the passengers in No. 1, Charles Stengel, while trying to get into the boat, rolled over the top-rail and fell into the boat. This caused the officer overseeing the loading to laugh heartily and quip, "That is the funniest sight I have seen to-night." According to Inger Sheil, the remark was likely to have been made by Lowe, as it was typical of his personality. While at No. 1, Fourth Officer Boxhall had been firing distress rockets and, as he helped fill the boat, Lowe heard "something about a ship on the port bow" and saw "her two masthead and her red sidelights." He also described the rockets being fired next to him as "deafening."

After No. 1 was launched, Lowe crossed over to the port side and found Sixth Officer Moody near lifeboats No. 14 and 16 and began to assist him in filling them, with Chief Officer Henry Wilde nearby, supervising No. 12's loading. The pair engaged in a conversation; the two junior officers felt that this group of boats needed to have an officer with them. Moody insisted that Lowe should get onto lifeboat No. 14 and that he would take charge of another lifeboat. Able Seaman Joseph Scarrott, in Boat 14, also recalled Lowe ordering Moody to take charge of Lifeboat No. 16.

As junior officers, Lowe and Moody both followed the "women and children first" order given by the captain. As there were women around, he allowed almost no men into No. 14, other than a few for rowing. He would later say, "There was no such thing as selecting. It was simply the first woman, whether first class, second class, third class, or sixty-seventh class. It was all the same; women and children were first... Regardless of class, or nationality, or pedigree." At least one first-class passenger tried to push passed him and only backed off after Lowe levelled his gun at him, and he physically threw out at least one passenger who jumped into the boat as it had begun lowering, threatening unbalance it.

By the time lifeboat 14 was being launched, things were beginning to get precarious on board as the majority of passengers began to realise that the ship was foundering. As lifeboat 14 was descending, Lowe used his gun to fire three shots, one at each deck they lowered by, along the side of the ship in order to frighten away a group of men attempting to leap into the lifeboat from the lower decks. During the inquiries, Lowe was emphatic in stating that he had not hit anyone, saying that he had looked where he was shooting, and this is backed by several eyewitnesses.

=== Lifeboat 14 and Carpathia ===
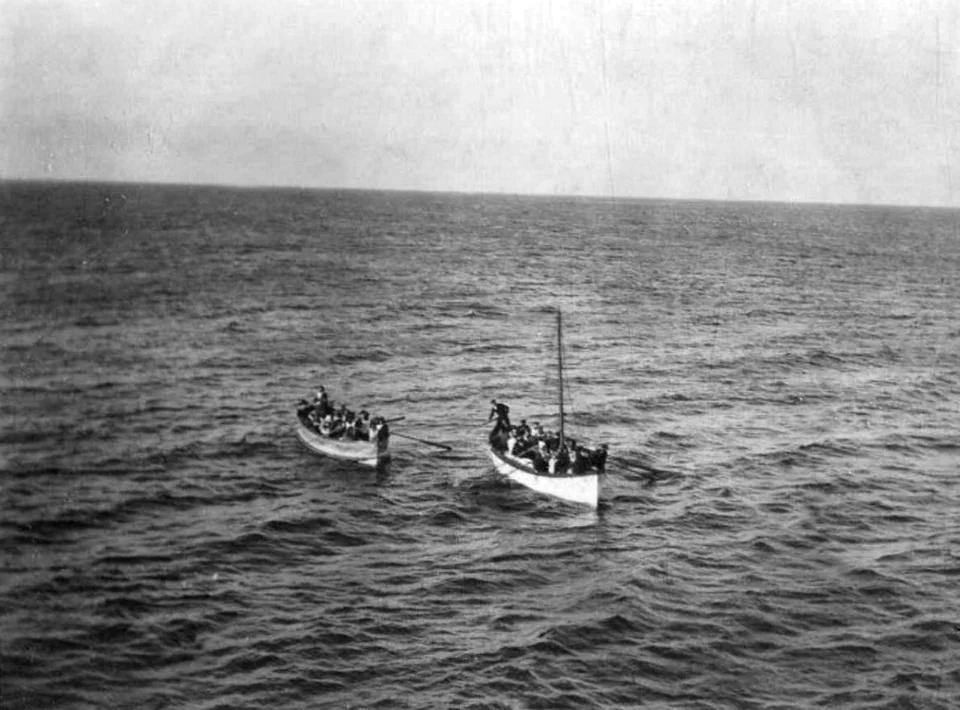
Lowe standing at the tiller of Lifeboat 14 (right) with Collapsible D (left) in tow; it is one of two known photos of an officer in charge of a Titanic lifeboat.

Lowe took charge of No. 14 from able seaman Joseph Scarrott. He expressed concern to Scarrott about whether he had overloaded the boat, asking, "Do you think the boat will stand it?" Scarrott replied, "Yes, she is hanging all right." Lowe then gave to order to lower away.

After reaching the water, No. 14's ropes jammed, leaving one end of the boat touching the water while the other end was still hanging above the surface. Lowe attempted to undo the ropes at the high end but ordering them cut loose from the height of about five feet. The boat splashed down heavily into the sea, frightening many aboard. He then ordered it to be rowed about 150 yd (140 m) away from Titanic. By the time the ship foundered at around 2:20 AM, Lowe had begun to gather several lifeboats together into a flotilla, tying them together to make sure they did not scatter. (Note: The flotilla consisted of lifeboats 4, 10, 12, and 14, and collapsible boat D.) Several eyewitnesses noted that Lowe wished to return to pick up survivors as soon as possible and, after passengers under his care protested against his plan, did he pull further away. Around the time the ship went down, he had begun to redistribute them amongst the flotilla, in order to ready his own lifeboat for a search for additional survivors. This process took more time than Lowe anticipated and, on several occasions, he used strong language to urge on hesitant passengers being transferred to other boats in the flotilla as, by then, the screams in the water were dying out quickly.

In charge of lifeboat No. 14, Lowe and around six or seven volunteer crewmembers went back to the site of the sinking. After finishing the redistribution, they followed the sounds back to the site of the wreck. It was apparent quite quickly the operation that they realised they had returned too late; the water was simply too cold for anyone to survive any great amount of time. Lowe and No. 14 spent until after dawn searching the wrecksite for anyone alive. In total, there were four men taken out of the water, one of whom died soon after being pulled from the water. (Note: Three of the four men are known to be first-class passenger William F. Hoyt, who died soon after being pulled into the boat, steward Harold Phillimore, and third-class passenger Fang Lang. The identity of the fourth man has never been established. Lowe himself did not know the identity of the people rescued by Lifeboat 14, safe for that of Hoyt whom he identified from items on his person prior to Hoyt's burial at sea from aboard RMS Carpathia.) Reportedly, voices could be heard in the darkness, but locating them proved to be a largely fruitless task, despite their best efforts. Lowe's lifeboat is noted as being the only lifeboat to return to the wreck site for survivors, and one of two to pick up survivors from the water, the other being Lifeboat No. 4, which had been near enough to the foundering ship to allow some people to swim up to it.

After leaving the wrecksite, Lowe had the mast raised and put up a sail to take advantage of a breeze that had sprung up; a testament to his skills as a boatman, his was the only lifeboat to utilise the provided sail. He spotted Collapsible D which "looked rather sorry" as it was having difficulty in rowing due to lack of seamen and with the sea becoming rougher; he sailed down to it and took it in tow. Soon after, he spotted the swamped Collapsible A which, according to him, was in a "worse plight" than Boat D had been. Around 12 survivors were rescued from Boat A into No. 14, including the only woman to be picked up from the water, Rhoda Abbott.

Lowe and his group of lifeboats were picked by the RMS Carpathia around 7:00 AM. A series of photographs taken by passenger Louis Ogden on the Carpathia clearly show Lowe at the tiller of lifeboat 14 as they approach rescue. He remained aboard his lifeboat long enough to ship the mast and make certain everything was properly stowed before boarding the ship.

=== Inquiries ===
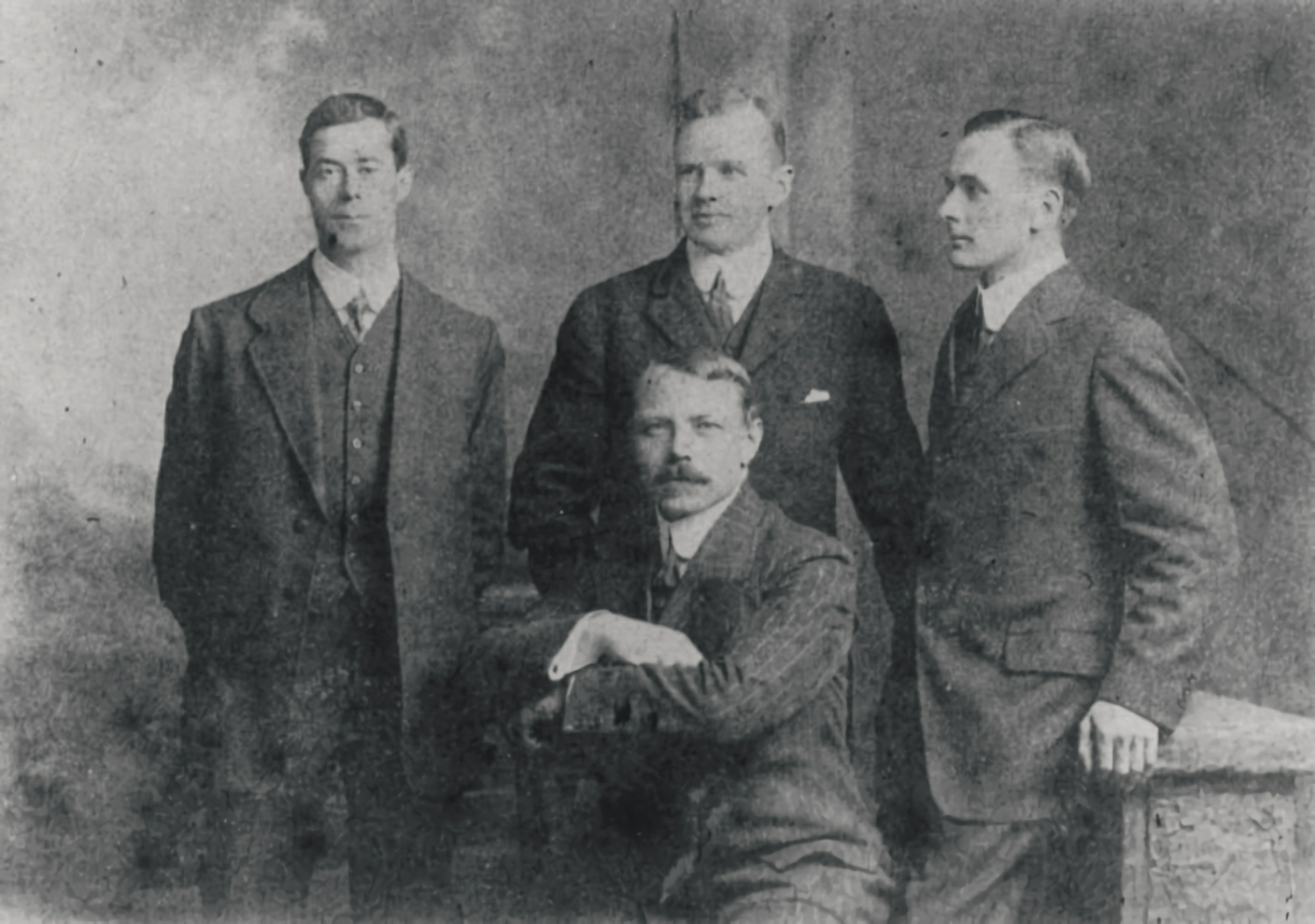
The four surviving officers of RMS Titanic. Standing, from left to right: Lowe, Charles Lightoller, and Joseph Boxhall. Sitting: Herbert Pitman.

The Titanic survivors arrived at Pier 54 in New York on 18 April. Immediately upon landing Lowe was served with a warrant which called upon him to testify in the American inquiry into the sinking. According to Second Officer Charles Lightoller, the surviving officers considered the inquiry 'a farce' and were highly resentful owing to perceived poor treatment by the American authorities. They were especially bemused that an enquiry into the sinking of a ship was being conducted by men with no knowledge of sailing, or the sea.

Unlike the other officers, Lowe, known for his bluntness, was vocally critical about the inquiry, telling a journalist from The Washington Post: "We all welcome this inquiry. But you Americans got up against us, and now we Britishers are up against you, and we shall see how it comes out." He also developed an intense dislike towards the American press and their photographers, particularly what he saw as their intrusive behavior.

During his Day 5 testimony, Lowe was direct and the exchanges between him and Senator William Alden Smith, chair of the Senate inquiry, were noted to have been antagonistic. When Smith asked him what an iceberg was composed of, Lowe responded, "Ice, I suppose, sir." He also admitted to swearing at White Star Line chairman J. Bruce Ismay when ordering him away from Lifeboat No. 5. When reluctant to repeat his words, Ismay encouraged him to, "Give us what you said," to which Lowe retorted with, "The chairman is examining me."

After his testimony, Lowe was approached by Italian Ambassador Luigi Cusani, who had attended that day's hearings. Like several survivors, Lowe used the term "Italians" in his Senate testimony as a generalised description of people on deck he could not see clearly in the dark night as his boat was being lowered. (Note: Contrary to belief, Lowe's remarks were not controversial at the time nor was he unique in using the term in such a manner as it was used by other survivors at both inquiries. For example, several occupants of Boat 14, passengers and crew alike, also described the men on deck in similar if not stronger language. As noted by historian Inger Sheil, their views were "tinted by the prejudice of their age.") Cusani raised his concerns with Lowe directly, who readily agreed to modify his wording. Drafting a statement at the Italian embassy which was co-signed by Cusani, Lowe asked for it to be added to the official U.S. inquiry transcripts, stating that "I feel honoured to give out the present statement." When subsequently speaking on the incident afterwards, he made a conscientious effort to avoid using the term in the same manner again.

Along with other surviving officers, Lowe boarded the RMS Adriatic on 2 May to return to England. At Liverpool, he was met by his father and sister Ada. He went on to participate in the British inquiry where he was noticeably more restrained in his language. His testimony was mainly regarding his rescue attempt on Lifeboat 14 after the ship sank and regarding any ice reports he saw prior to the disaster. When asked to repeat what he said to the White Star chairman, which had by then become one of the best known stories from the sinking, Lowe chuckled and responded, "I think you know."

Upon his return to his home town of Barmouth 1,300 people attended a reception held in his honor at the Picture Pavilion. He was presented with a commemorative gold watch, with the inscription "Presented to Harold Godfrey Lowe, 5th officer R.M.S. Titanic by his friends in Barmouth and elsewhere in recognition and appreciation of his gallant services at the foundering of the Titanic 15th April 1912." He was also presented with a set of nautical equipment from survivor Renee Harris inscribed with "To Harold Godfrey Lowe, 5th Officer RMS Titanic. "The real hero of the Titanic." With deepest gratitude from Mrs Henry B. Harris of New York."

== Later career and retirement ==
After the inquiries, Lowe returned to sea aboard the SS Medic as the ship's third officer in July 1912. His presence on the ship attracted the attention of the local Australian newspapers but Lowe refused to discuss the disaster any further, remarking that he was "so sick of it all." During the ship's return voyage in October, he suffered a broken leg and was subsequently confined to bed for the remainder of it. In December 1912, he appointed third officer of the SS Gothic, again on the Australian run.

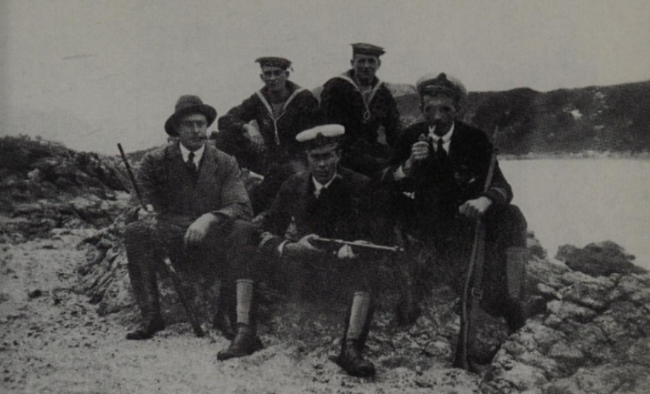
Lieutenant Lowe (seated centre) with a shore party in Vladivostok, during World War I

In June 1913, Lowe received commission as a Sub-Lieutenant in the Royal Naval Reserve. That same month, he appeared as a witness in the case of Ryan v. The Oceanic Steam Navigation Company. In July 1914, Lowe was promoted to senior officer, being appointed as Second Officer aboard the SS Cornishman.

Lowe was promoted to Lieutenant in July 1915, just under a year after World War I broke out. During the war, Lowe was initially aboard HMS Donegal which was part of the Grand Fleet with which it took part in an unsuccessful hunt for the German raiders such as SMS Möwe. The ship narrowly missed action in the Battle of Jutland, being sent on detached service in the mid-Atlantic just before the naval engagement. In June 1917, he was transferred to HMS Suffolk, and saw service in Vladivostok in the Siberian intervention during the Russian Civil War. During his service there, Lowe learned to speak Russian with some fluency.

Lowe was demobilised in May 1919, returning home and spending a few months with his wife and children in Barmouth, his hometown. In July of that same year, he was in a boating accident with two others when his sailing vessel capsized in Barmouth Quay. Lowe managed to get hold of the keel of the boat, while holding up the boy who had been with them with his other hand. They were rescued and brought ashore by a yachtsman who was one of those who saw the incident happen and immediately went to their aid.

In November 1919, Lowe returned to serve with the White Star Line and ships of the International Mercantile Marine fleet, mostly on the Australian and Canadian routes. Though he would reach the rank of chief officer, like his fellow surviving Titanic officers, Lowe never held a command of his own. He went on to serve as senior officer on ships such as the RMS Cedric (including his first voyage to New York City since the Titanic disaster, in January 1920), SS Canada, SS Regina, SS Gallic, SS Suevic, SS Laurentic, SS Ceramic, RMS Baltic, and SS Doric. The Doric was his last ship before retiring from the White Star Line in 1931.

In 1923, Lowe was promoted to the rank of Lieutenant Commander. He was released from the Naval Reserves in 1927 with the rank of Commander, having received the Reserve Decoration. The White Star Line honoured Lowe with a ceremony at the Canada Docks in Liverpool where he was presented with the decoration by White Star Line Commodore Charles Bartlett.

From 1932 to 1938, Lowe was a member of the Conway Borough Council, representing the Deganwy Ward; he was elected for two terms unopposed before retiring; he turned down an offer to run for mayor, balking at the unwanted publicity that would have come with the position. During his time as a councillor, Lowe was noted as being diligent, his attendance surpassing those of his colleagues. He took particular interest in improving local infrastructure and amenities in Deganwy and volunteered to arrange the annual Armistice Day celebrations. In 1937, he was present for the opening of a local Civic Centre where the guest of honour was former Prime Minister David Lloyd George.

With the outbreak of World War II, despite his failing health, Lowe served as an Air Raid Warden and volunteered his home as a sector post, until a stroke in 1942 obliged him to take to a wheelchair and forced him to resign from his wartime role.

== Personal life ==
In September 1913, Lowe married Ellen Marion "Nellie" Whitehouse (1885–1947), whom he got engaged in early 1911 and with whom he had a lenghty courtship. Upon marriage, he began using Colwyn Bay, where his wife's family lived at Bryn Mostyn, as his shore address. They had two children together: Florence Josephine Edge (known as "Josie"; 1914–1996), and Harold William George (1916–1999) who was born while Lowe was serving in World War I. Lowe's grandson, John Harold Lowe, son of Josie, was a captain in the British Merchant Navy.

Harold Jr. served in the British Army during World War II, and was serving in Burma at the time of his father's death. He immigrated to Australia with his family after the war, and had two children; he died in 1999. Josie remained in Deganwy until her death in 1996; her ashes were buried in her parents' grave.

Nellie Lowe later participated in her husband's political activities, chairing committees to support the work of the Conway Borough Council. She was also active in community work, serving as chairwoman of the North Wales coastal branch of the Electrical Association for Women (EAW) during the 1930s and until her death, and supported the local hospital. Nellie died after a short illness in February 1947.

According to his Board of Trade certification applications, Lowe had a tattoo on his right forearm, of his initials "HGL" in a heart.

Lowe had six siblings: two sisters, Ada Florence and Annie May; and four brothers, George Ernest, Edgar Reginald, Arthur Frederick, and Edward. Two of his younger brothers followed Lowe into the merchant service. Edgar became a captain in the Union Company, after settling down in New Zealand. Edward was lost at sea at age 33, when he was swept overboard from the SS Waitemata in 1927.

He was initiated as a freemason in the St. Trillo Lodge in 1921.

In 1929, the start of the Great Depression led to Lowe, who was careful and frugal with his money and investments, losing nearly all his savings. Though his wife's family was still comfortably well-off and could support him, his personal losses were a blow that added on top of the disappointing lack of promotion in his career.

Lowe's father-in-law, William Whitehouse, who was being cared for by his daughter Nellie for years, died in May 1931. Nellie's inheritance after the death of her father secured the family's precarious financial position. Soon afterwards, due to recurring ill-health, Lowe retired from seafaring, saying he wanted to enjoy "ten years of fishing and shooting before I am too old to do so." That same year, he moved his family from Colwyn Bay to Deganwy where he bought a home in Nellie's name at 1 Marine Crescent, overlooking Conwy Bay.

In retirement, Lowe served as a churchwarden, and spent time fishing or hunting on his motorboat Pirate on River Conwy. Interested in firearms since he was a young man, Lowe was considered a great shot, once even being invited to participate at the King's Prize in the annual Imperial Meeting competition. Prior to World War I, he developed into a life-long avid amateur photographer, and was a skilled artist who built ship models in his spare time, and drew ink and pencil sketches of both landscapes and ships.

Lowe was a life-long teetotaler, a life choice likely influenced because of his father's alcoholism. An allegation made during the U.S. inquiries that he was drunk during the night the Titanic sank made him noticeably angry and upset; he had to be persuaded to not take the matter any further after vehemently denying it, saying, "I am an abstainer... I say it, sir, without fear of contradiction."

In November 1937, Lowe nearly drowned in the Conwy River. He was accompanied by his friend William Parry, a railway clerk, and the pair set out in a dinghy to reach his motorboat, Pirate in choppy waters. While Parry managed to step onto the Pirate, a gust of wind caused Lowe to lose his balance and fall between the two crafts. Parry managed to grab Lowe's coat collar and pulled him into the motorboat despite the fact Lowe's knee-length boots had become waterlogged. The incident made news in the Liverpool Echo, and caused Lowe much embarrassment.

=== Illness and death ===
In 1942, Lowe collapsed from a cerebral stroke which left him partially paralysed. He was confined to a wheelchair for the remainder of his life, cared for by his wife Nellie and daughter Josie. Lowe died at his home on 12 May 1944, aged 61, after a long illness. He was the first of the surviving officers of the Titanic to die.

After his death, Lowe was eulogised as being "a man who made up his mind what his duty was and did it regardless of personal consequences." At his funeral, on 16 May, both Anglican and Masonic rites were performed. His coffin was covered the Union Jack flag and decorated with his Royal Naval Reserve ceremonial sword and cap, and his medals. Lowe's body was buried at Llandrillo-yn-Rhos Churchyard in Rhos-on-Sea.

== Legacy ==
In researching on her biography of Lowe, Titanic historian Inger Sheil noted the overwhelmingly positive response Lowe received from survivors and the press for his conduct during the sinking. She noted both the volume of feeling shown towards Lowe by the people he helped and also "a surprising depth." Many passengers remarked that his decisive leadership and organisational skills as having been decisive in their survival. Survivor Renee Harris, writing in 1932, asserted that through all the years, Lowe had stood out in her memory as "one of the finest men it has been my privilege to meet."

Lowe's exchange with Ismay at Lifeboat 5 became one of the central stories of the sinking and made Lowe one of the most prominent survivors of the disaster in the immediate aftermath. George Bernard Shaw, during his criticism of the press romanticising the disaster, pointed at Lowe's language as being a natural response to the situation. Arthur Conan Doyle lauded Lowe: "I cannot imagine a finer example of an officer doing his duty than that a subordinate should dare to speak thus to the managing director of the Line when he thought that he was impeding his life-saving work." Survivor Clear Cameron approved of Lowe admonishing Ismay, whom she was critical of. In a letter to a friend, she remarked: "Officer Lowe gave him the socks before he left the Titanic. He didn't know who he was talking to and what's more he didn't care."

Lowe later received offers of money (which he turned down) and received multiple gifts from grateful passengers. He also showed appreciation for the responses he got, though usually brushing them off by saying he had only been doing his duty. Writing in response to passenger Selena Rogers Cook a year later, he remarked, "Several survivors of the Titanic have written letters to me, but I fancy they have been rather too glowing, any way I suppose it is from their hearts."

An oft-repeated allegation originates from a May 1912 Semi-Monthly Magazine article ghost-written for Titanic passenger Charlotte Collyer which alleged that Lowe initially refused to save one passenger from the water because he was a "Jap" and that the passenger, Fang Lang – who was actually Chinese – was picked up only after passengers pressured Lowe to. This account is almost certainly false as Collyer was in no position to witness the boat's return to the site. She, along with all passengers except one, had been transferred out to other boats, a fact that Lowe and at least two other crewmembers of No. 14 testified to. (Note: Second-class passenger Charles Williams, world rackets champion at the time, who had volunteered to help row due to shortage of seamen, also volunteered to stay with No. 14 and returned to the wrecksite, the only passenger to do so.) At the British inquiry, Lowe reiterated the fact, stating that "it would be no good me going back with a load of people." Collyer's own daughter also contradicts this account.

Lowe had worked with Chinese crew as an able seaman with the Blue Funnel Line and, in contrast to other British crewmembers, held them in high regard, considering them hardworking and honest. During this time, he risked his life to save a "Chinaman" from drowning by diving after him and keeping him afloat until help came along, despite being on the ship's 'sick list' with blood poisoning at the time of the incident. Furthermore, at the inquiries, Lowe stated he did not know who exactly had been rescued from the water as they never approached him afterwards.

=== Recognition and memorials ===
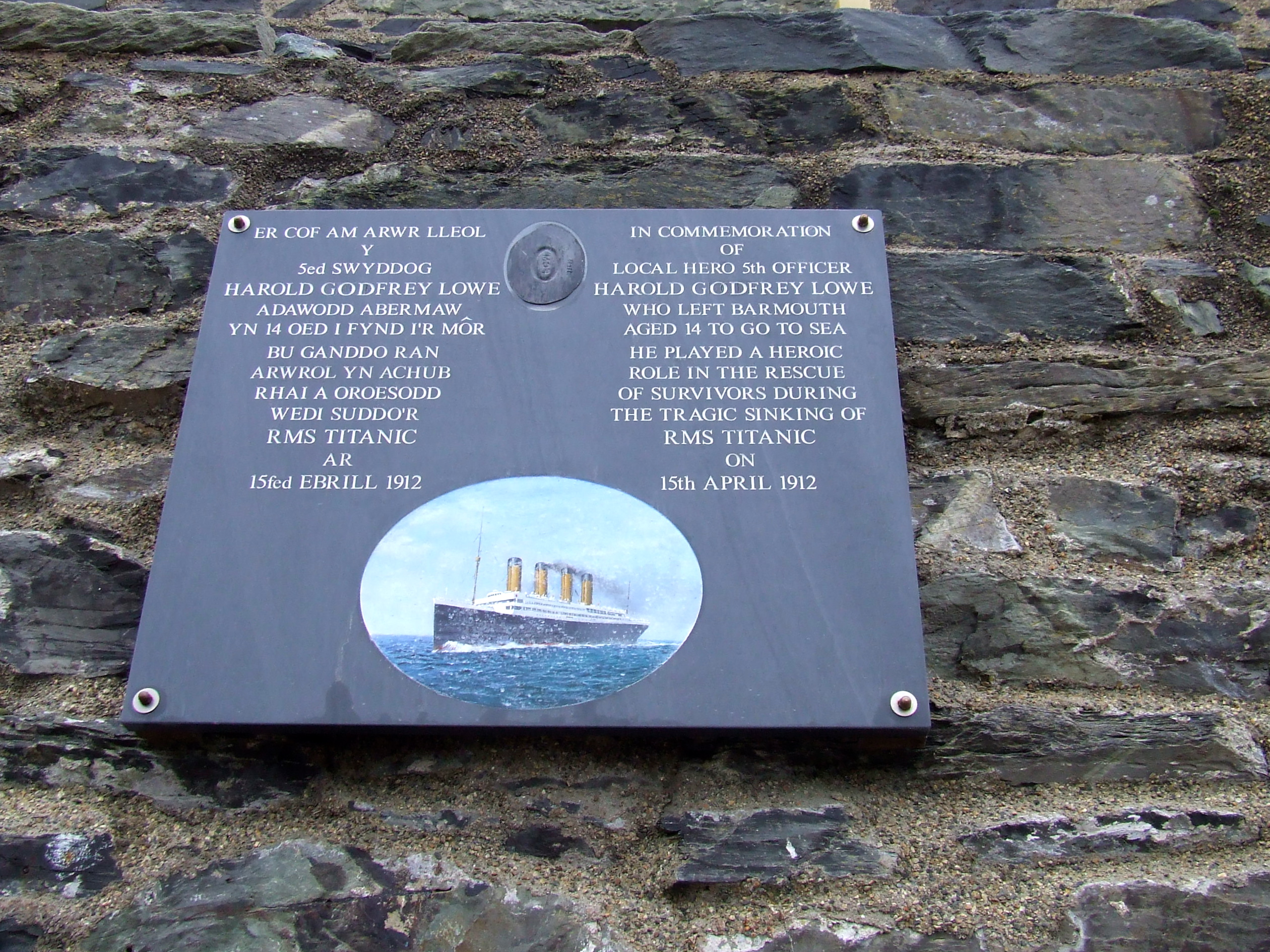
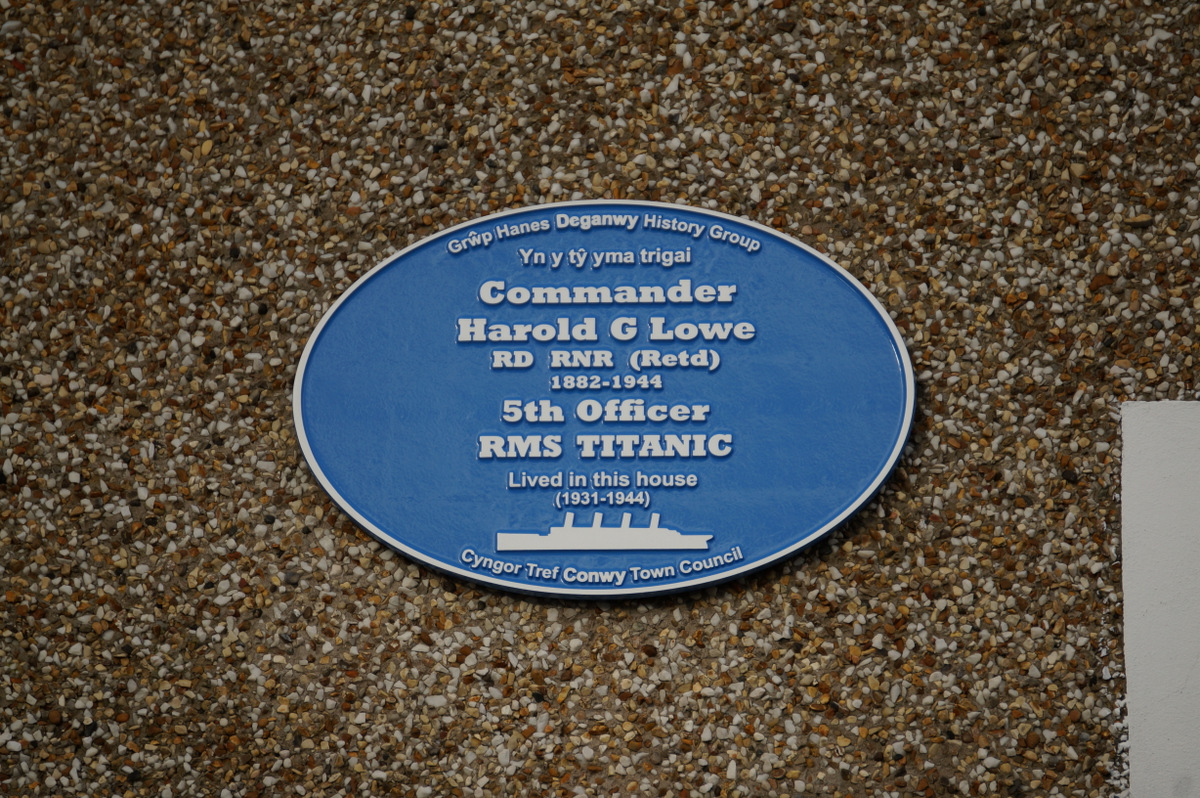
A slate plaque dedicated to Lowe on the harbourmaster's office at Barmouth Quay (left) and a blue plaque marking Lowe's last home in Deganwy (right)

In 2004, a menu of the first meal ever served aboard Titanic, which Lowe had sent to his then-fiancée when the ship was docked in Ireland, sold for £51,000, breaking the record for auctioned Titanic memorabilia at that time.

On 7 April 2012, a blue plaque was unveiled by the Deganwy History Group at Lowe's final residence at 1 Marine Crescent in Deganwy, where he lived from his retirement in 1931 until his death in 1944.

A slate plaque in Lowe's memory was hung on the centennial anniversary of Titanic's sinking in Barmouth. Memorializing Lowe's service, the plaque is inscribed in both Welsh and English, with pictures of Lowe and Titanic. It reads: "In Commemoration of local hero 5th Officer Harold Godfrey Lowe who left Barmouth aged 14 to go to sea. He played a heroic role in the rescue of survivors during the sinking of RMS Titanic on 15 April 1912." The plaque was unveiled by his grandson, John Lowe and Maddy Matthews, a student who petitioned for the memorial.

== Cultural portrayals ==
Lowe has been portrayed on screen several times. Most notably, he was portrayed by Welsh actor Ioan Gruffudd in the 1997 film Titanic, and was depicted rescuing fictional first-class passenger Rose DeWitt Bukater (Kate Winslet) from the freezing ocean.

- Howard Pays - A Night to Remember (1958)
- Karl Howman - S.O.S. Titanic (1979)
- Kavan Smith - Titanic (1996)
- Ioan Gruffudd - Titanic (1997)
- Ifan Meredith - Titanic (2012)
- Chris Bohan - Unsinkable (2024)
- Oisín Thompson - Titanic Sinks Tonight (2025)
