= SS Skirmisher =

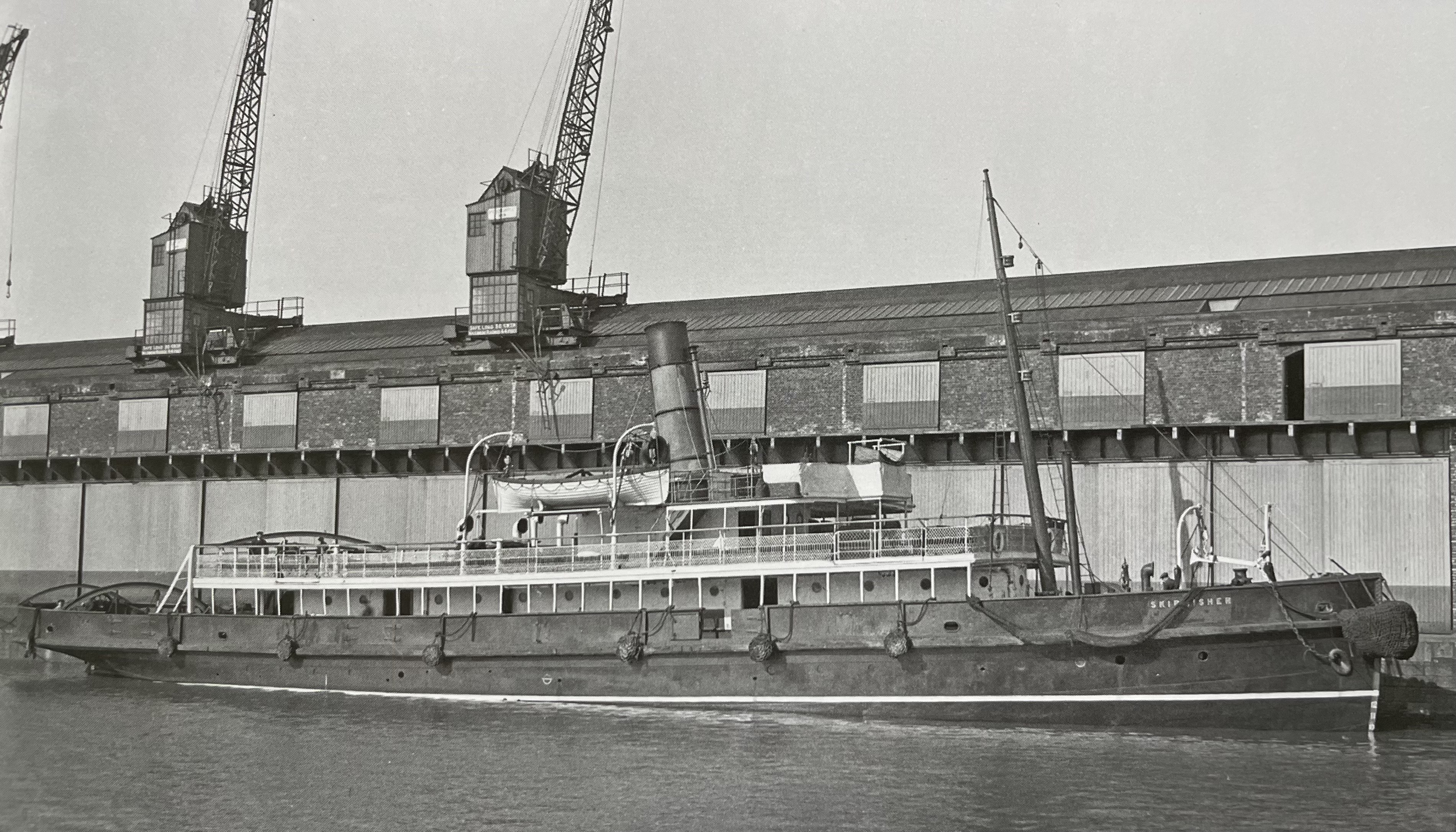
- SS Skirmisher at Liverpool, 1914

History

United Kingdom
- Name: SS Skirmisher
- Owner: Cunard Line (1884–1934); Cunard-White Star (1934-1946)
- Port of registry: Liverpool
- Route: Served in the Mersey
- Ordered: 1883
- Builder: J&G Thomson, Clydebank
- Yard number: 221
- Laid down: 1883
- Launched: 14 May 1884
- In service: 5 July 1884
- Out of service: 1945
- Fate: Scrapped in 1947

General characteristics
- Type: Passenger tender
- Tonnage: 607 GRT
- Length: 165 feet 0 inches (50.29 m)
- Beam: 32 feet 3 inches (9.83 m)
- Depth: 15 feet 0 inches (4.57 m)
- Propulsion: Twin screw
- Sail plan: Jib sail x1, later removed
- Speed: 13 knots (24 km/h)
- Capacity: 717 passengers
- Notes: First twin screw Cunard vessel

SS Skirmisher was a steel tugboat and passenger tender of the Cunard Line built in 1884 for service in the Mersey at Liverpool. She was used in this role through the Cunard-White Star merger until 1941. She was sold for scrap in 1947.

== Career ==
Skirmisher was constructed in 1884 to act as a tender and part time tugboat for the new RMS Umbria and RMS Etruria, which were too big to enter the landing stage in the Mersey at lower tides. Skirmisher was to carry passengers from the docks to these ships. Her machinery was a single ended boiler originally with six furnaces, replaced in 1908 with two boilers. Her engines produced 1,104HP, giving her an average speed of 13 knots. In July 1886, the builder's model of the Skirmisher was up for display at Liverpool, as well as other Cunard vessels. In May 1894, she acted as an escort to Queen Victoria's yacht. She also sailed to Spithead for the 1897 Spithead Naval Review, where she acted as a tender exclusively to the RMS Campania. By 1902, she had permanently replaced the old Satellite as a Liverpool tender.

During the ship's 1908 refit, an extra deck was added, her funnel was heightened, and her old boiler was replaced with 2 slightly smaller but more efficient ones. With this extra deck, it was easier for her to tend to the massive new RMS Mauretania and RMS Lusitania. She continued service in this configuration until 1941.

In April 1913, the Skirmisher steamed to the Clyde, to witness the launch of the RMS Aquitania. In 1917, Skirmisher was berthed across the Gladstone Dock gate, to protect the dock from being torpedoed by U-boats. From 1922 until 1923, she was used as a tender on the river Clyde as part of the Cunard-Anchor Line joint service.

== War service ==
During the May Blitz in 1941, the SS Malakand was docked in Liverpool nearby the Skirmisher. When Malakand exploded, the bridge on Skirmisher was completely destroyed by flying debris, and the mast pierced Skirmisher's hull, and quickly sank. She was refloated, and converted into a fireboat, where she could pump 100 tons of water per hour. In 1944, she visited Fishguard to serve the RMS Queen Mary, with Winston Churchill on board. Due to bad weather, Queen Mary diverted to the Clyde, and Skirmisher returned to the Mersey.

She was withdrawn from service in October 1945, and her upper superstructure and remaining fittings were stripped. She was towed to Garston in March, 1947 where her hull was broken up for scrap.

== Incidents ==
- On April 18, 1889, while departing the Liverpool Landing Stage, a fireman attempted to jump on to the Skirmisher, but hit his head and fell into the river.
- On September 1, 1891, the Mersey, a Woodside river ferry, collided with the Skirmisher. The Mersey was slightly damaged, and Skirmisher had two bow plates damaged.
- On December 28, 1895, Skirmisher collided by a rebounding buoy from the departing Etruria. She was beached, and refloated the following morning.
- On May 25, 1902, while towing a Mersey flat named Kate, the propellers of the Skirmisher damaged the flat and it quickly sank.
- On August 26, 1908, the Etruria collided with Mudhopper No. 19 while departing. The Skirmisher tried to pull the hopper away from the Etruria. but failed as mooring lines snapped.
- On November 22, 1910, the Mersey ferry Snowdrop collided with a luggage boat, which then collided into the Skirmisher. RMS Lusitania was delayed several hours as a result.
- On June 4, 1927, Skirmisher collided with steamer Manx Maid at the Princes Landing Stage in Liverpool.
- On November 12, 1929, a man attempted to jump on board Skirmisher from the Landing Stage, and fell into the river.
- On February 3, 1934, Skirmisher ran aground on the West Crosby bank, and was refloated undamaged.
- On May 4, 1941, Skirmisher was badly damaged and sunk when the Malakand exploded. She was refloated soon after.
- On July 28, 1945, the tugboat Moose, of the Canadian Pacific, capsized in the river. Skirmisher as well as several other tugs dashed from the Landing Stage to aid those trapped in the Moose.

== See also ==
- SS Jackal (1852)
- SS Satellite
