= SS Satellite =

1848 tender ship

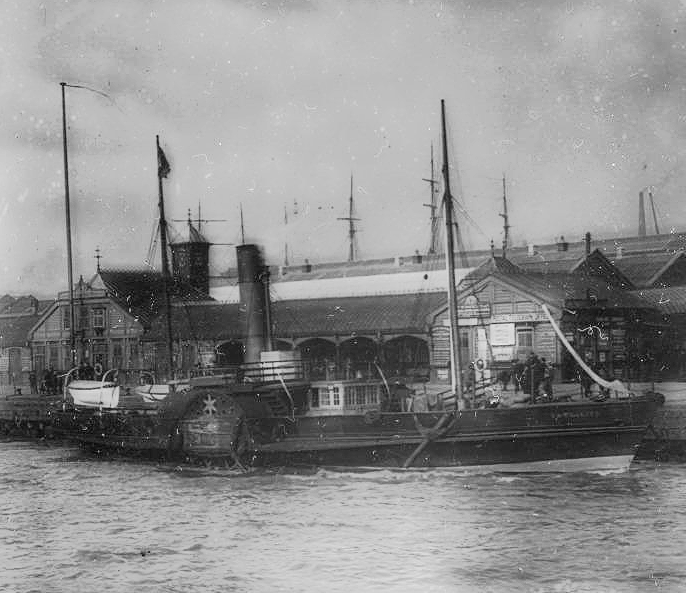

History

United Kingdom
- Name: Satellite
- Owner: Cunard Line (1848–1902)
- Operator: Cunard Line (1848–1902)
- Port of registry: Glasgow
- Ordered: 1847
- Builder: Robert Napier, Govan
- Yard number: 25
- Laid down: 1847
- Launched: 21 January 1848
- Completed: 17 August 1848
- In service: 1848
- Out of service: 1902
- Identification: United Kingdom Official Number 23924
- Fate: Scrapped 1902
- Notes: First tender for Cunard

General characteristics
- Type: Ship's tender
- Tonnage: 157 GRT, 82 NRT
- Length: 108.5 ft (33.1 m)
- Beam: 18.8 ft (5.7 m)
- Depth: 9 ft 8 in (2.95 m)
- Installed power: 80 hp (60 kW)
- Propulsion: Side lever engine, side paddles
- Sail plan: Schooner rig
- Speed: 8 knots (15 km/h; 9.2 mph)
- Capacity: 600 passengers

SS Satellite was the first tender owned by Cunard Line, operated on the river Mersey between 1848 and 1902.

== Career ==
Satellite was a ship's tender owned by Cunard Line, built in 1848 by Robert Napier in Govan, Scotland. She was launched on 21 January 1848, and was the first iron-hulled ship for Cunard. With a smart funnel and raked bow, the Satellite was considered to be a rather handsome ship, designed more like a yacht rather than a tender. The vessel also lacked a bowsprit, which was a highly common feature on vessels at the time. She was completed and registered at Glasgow on 17 August 1848.

During the Crimean War, the Satellite was used to ferry soldiers to ocean liners in the Mersey, such as the SS Hansa and Lord Raglan. However, it is unclear if this was a regular occasion or not. After the war, she resumed her regular duties of tendering the liners. She did this in unison with a younger and larger tender, the Jackal.

After Cunard rebranded in 1878, most of their ships changed their port of registry from Glasgow to Liverpool. However, Satellite would only change registry in June 1898.

On Monday, January 6, 1879, the Satellite was slightly damaged when the steamer Cheshire hit the tender at the midships. Both continued on their passages, though minor panic did break out on the Cheshire.

The Satellite was involved in another, but much more minor, collision on Friday 22 January 1892 when she ran into the starboard paddle box of the steam tug Spindrift. The former was undamaged, while the latter had to be docked for repairs to the paddle box.

== Redundancy and retiring ==
The Satellite was small, and her passengers and crew were always completely exposed to the elements. Thus in 1884, the much larger and modern SS Skirmisher was built to act as a tender. Satellite was used less as a passenger tender, after the completion of Skirmisher and began to be used to transport workers from ship to shore more often.

By October 1902, Satellite was sold to Alexander Gordon of Newry for £410 to be broken up. Scrapping of the Satellite was finished in under two months.

== See also ==
- SS Jackal (1852)
- SS Skirmisher
