= PS Ireland =

Paddle wheel steamship known for tendering the Titanic

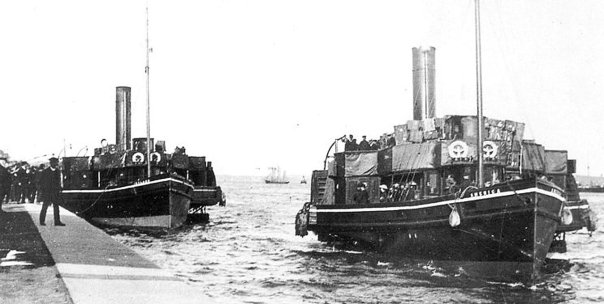
- The tenders Ireland (left) and America (right) at Queenstown c. 1912

History
- Name: PS Ireland
- Owner: Clyde Shipping Company
- Operator: Clyde Shipping Company
- Port of registry: Queenstown, Ireland
- Ordered: 1891
- Builder: JP Rennoldson & Sons, South Shields
- Yard number: 128
- Completed: 1891
- In service: 1891
- Out of service: 1928
- Fate: Broken up in April 1928

General characteristics
- Length: 132 feet
- Beam: 23 feet
- Installed power: Side-lever steam engine
- Propulsion: Paddle

PS Ireland was a paddle-wheel steamship of the Clyde Shipping Line, built in 1891. Together with her sister ship PS America, she tendered the various ocean liners which came through the port of Queenstown, Ireland (now Cobh). In 1893, her and her sister replaced the old Cunard tender Jackal for tendering services to the Cunard Line fleet.

Like her sister ship, Ireland is best known for her assistance of the RMS Titanic, the ill-fated ocean liner who made her final port of call at Queenstown on her maiden voyage. Ireland brought Irish immigrants to the Titanic, followed by America, who brought 123 passengers. On 19 April 1912, following the sinking of the Titanic, Ireland and America's White Star Line flags were flown at half-mast.

During World War I in 1918, she was used as a mine sweeper.

Ireland was scrapped in April 1928.

== See also ==
- PS America
- SS Jackal (1852)
