= Rhoda Abbott =

RMS Titanic's passenger (1873–1946)

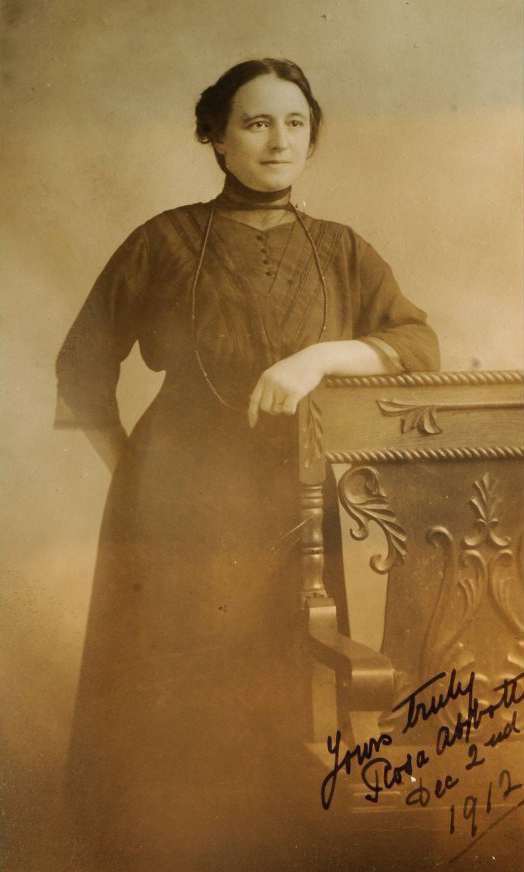
- Abbott in 1911
- Born: Rhoda Mary Hunt; 14 January 1873; Aylesbury, Buckinghamshire, England
- Died: 18 February 1946 (aged 73); Barnes, Surrey, England
- Other names: Rosa Abbott; Rhoda Williams
- Known for: Only woman to survive the break-up and sinking of the RMS Titanic
- Spouses: George 'Stanton' Abbott (m. 1891; div. 1911) George Charles Williams (m. 1912; died 1938)
- Children: Rossmore Edward Abbott; Eugene Joseph Abbott

Rhoda Mary Williams (née Hunt; formerly Abbott; 14 January 1873 – 18 February 1946), sometimes referred to as Rosa Abbott, was a passenger on the RMS Titanic. She was the only woman who went down with the sinking of the ship and survived in the cold waters, finding refuge on Collapsible Boat A where she was picked up, along with around a dozen others, by Fifth Officer Harold Lowe and the crew of Lifeboat No. 14.

== Early life ==
Abbott was born in Aylesbury, Buckinghamshire, on 14 January 1873, the daughter of Joseph Hunt and his wife Sarah Green Hunt. She grew up in Aylesbury, and spent her early adulthood in St Albans with her family, before moving to the United States in 1894.

Upon her arrival in Providence, Rhode Island, she met London-born middleweight champion Stanton Abbott, whom she married soon after in 1895. The couple had two children, Rossmore (21 February 1896 – 15 April 1912) and Eugene (31 March 1898 – 15 April 1912). She settled as a housewife and mother and was active at the local Grace Episcopal Church, as well as helping around the house.

In 1911, Abbott was divorced from her husband, returned to England with her sons on the RMS Olympic, working as a seamstress, as well as becoming a soldier in The Salvation Army. However, she quickly realized that the boys were not happy living in England and booked a return to America in April 1912.

== Sinking of the Titanic ==
The family boarded the RMS Titanic as third-class passengers in Southampton on 10 April. On board, she befriended Amy Stanley, Emily Goldsmith, and May Howard, who had cabins nearby.

On April 14, 1912, the family was asleep when the Titanic hit an iceberg. By 00:15, they were alerted by a steward to put on life jackets and retreat to the ship's deck. After waiting in line to follow other third-class passengers to the deck, Abbott and her sons waited at the second-class saloon area. There, her son Rossmore is said to have knelt in prayer asking that his mother's life be spared even if he and his brother were not saved. Eventually, Abbott's sons (aged 13 and 16) were able to accompany their mother to the lifeboats. They arrived when one of the final remaining lifeboats, Collapsible C, was already being loaded around 02:00. When it was her turn to enter the lifeboat, she realized that her sons would be denied a spot, and stepping back, refused a place in the lifeboat.

When the ship sank, Abbott was swept from the deck into the water. She tried to hold onto her sons but it was in vain and she was separated from them. At risk of developing hypothermia in the freezing water, she was able to reach Collapsible Boat A, which had washed off Titanic at 02:15. Hours went by before Fifth Officer Harold Lowe returned with lifeboat 14 to retrieve survivors in the water. Several occupants of Boat A had either succumbed or slipped back into the icy water; of the people on board, Abbott was one of only 13 who survived. According to onlookers, Lowe first took off Abbott, the sole woman on Boat A, warning the others to stay back. She was given whiskey from passengers in Boat D, which was in tow behind, and fireman Thomas Threlfall subsequently held onto her until the reached Carpathia.

Abbott's two sons were lost at sea, and only Rossmore's body was later identified. She would later say she had no regrets about remaining on the Titanic until the very end because it allowed her to stay with her sons. On the rescue ship Carpathia, Abbott received special care in the smoking room. In addition to suffering from exposure, her legs were badly damaged by frostbite by the immersion in frigid water so that she could not move until arrival in New York. There she was hospitalized for two weeks in Manhattan's St. Vincent's Hospital. She was one of the last survivors to be discharged.

Later on, Abbott gave an interview to The Evening Bulletin in Providence, Rhode Island.

Abbott's name was mistakenly reported as "Rosa" in the press in 1912, leading to longterm confusion among the public.

== Later life ==
As a result of the sinking of the Titanic, Abbott had respiratory problems, including severe bouts of asthma, for the rest of her life. On 16 December 1912, she married longtime friend George Charles Williams, and the couple settled in Jacksonville, Florida. By 1928, they had returned to England to settle Williams' father's estate in London where he suffered a debilitating stroke. Abbott took care of her husband until his death in 1938.

Abbott died in Barnes, Surrey, of heart failure as a result of hypertension on 18 February 1946, at the age of 73. Her body was cremated, and her ashes were scattered at Mortlake Crematorium in Richmond, Surrey.
