= PS America =

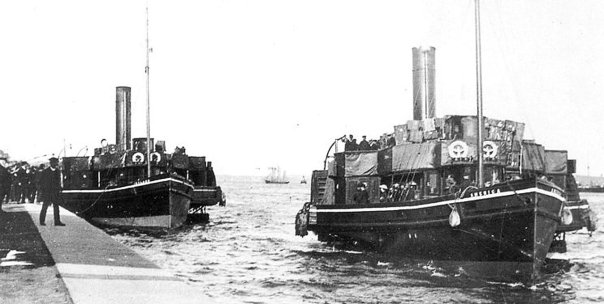
- The tenders America (right) and Ireland (left) at Queenstown c. 1912

History
- Name: PS America
- Owner: Clyde Shipping Company
- Operator: Clyde Shipping Company
- Port of registry: Queenstown, Ireland
- Builder: JP Rennoldson & Sons, South Shields
- Completed: 1891
- In service: 1891
- Out of service: 1945
- Fate: Broken up in December 1945

General characteristics
- Length: 135 feet
- Beam: 28 feet
- Installed power: Side-lever steam engine
- Propulsion: Paddle
- Capacity: 300 passengers

PS America was a paddle wheel steamship of the Clyde Shipping Company, built in 1891. Together with her sister ship PS Ireland, she tendered various ocean liners, such as White Star Line ships and Cunard Line ships which stopped to embark passengers at Queenstown, Ireland (now Cobh). In 1893, her and her sister replaced the old Cunard tender Jackal for tendering services to the Cunard Line fleet.

She is best known for her assistance of the RMS Titanic, who was making her final call of port at Queenstown on her maiden voyage. America embarked 123 passengers onto Titanic (three First-Class, seven Second-Class and one hundred-thirteen Third-Class). The Titanic sank on 15 April 1912 after colliding with an iceberg, partway through her maiden voyage. Following the sinking of the Titanic, America and Ireland's White Star Line flags were raised half-mast on 19 April 1912.

America was broken up on 11 December 1945, then under the name Seamore.

== See also ==
- PS Ireland
- SS Jackal (1852)
