= RMS Etruria =

Ship built in 1884

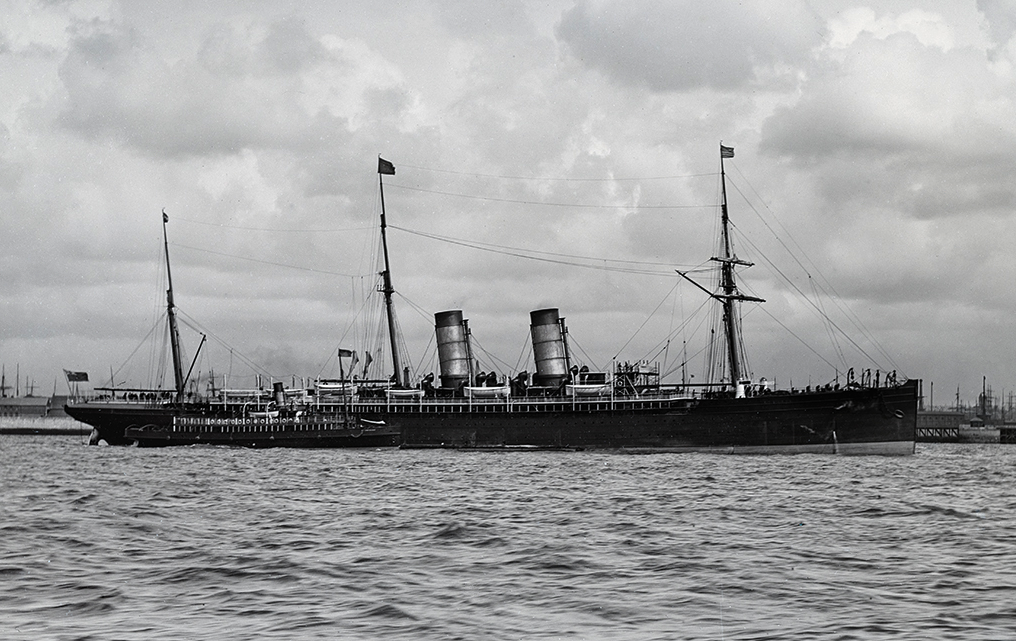
- RMS Etruria with SS Skirmisher

History

United Kingdom
- Name: Etruria
- Namesake: Etruria
- Owner: Cunard SS Co
- Operator: Cunard SS Co
- Port of registry: Liverpool
- Route: Liverpool – Queenstown – New York
- Ordered: 19 July 1883
- Builder: John Elder & Co, Glasgow
- Yard number: 286
- Launched: 20 September 1884
- Completed: 10 March 1885
- Maiden voyage: 25 April 1885
- Out of service: August 1908
- Identification: UK official number 91187; code letters JTPM
- Fate: Scrapped in Preston in 1910
- Notes: One of the last steamships to be fitted with auxiliary sails

General characteristics
- Type: Ocean liner
- Tonnage: 1884: 7,129 GRT, 3,258 NRT
- Length: 501.6 ft (152.9 m)
- Beam: 57.2 ft (17.4 m)
- Depth: 38.2 ft (11.6 m)
- Decks: 5
- Installed power: 1,559 NHP
- Propulsion: 3-cylinder compound engine
- Sail plan: Barque or barquentine
- Speed: 19.5 knots (36.1 km/h; 22.4 mph)
- Capacity: 1885: 550 First Class; 800 Second Class; 1892: 500 First Class; 160 Second Class; 800 Third Class

RMS Etruria was a transatlantic ocean liner built by John Elder & Co of Glasgow, Scotland in 1884 for Cunard Line. Etruria and her sister ship Umbria were the last two Cunarders that were fitted with auxiliary sails. Both ships were among the fastest and largest liners then in service. Etruria was completed on 10 March 1885, twelve weeks after Umbria, and entered service on the Liverpool – New York route.

Etruria had two large funnels that gave the outward impression of great power. She had three large steel masts that were barque-rigged. Another innovation was that she was equipped with refrigeration machinery, but it was the single-screw propulsion that would bring the most publicity later in her career.

The ship epitomized the luxuries of Victorian style. The public rooms in First Class were full of ornately carved furniture and heavy velvet curtains hung in all the rooms, and they were cluttered with bric-a-brac that period fashion dictated. These rooms, and the First Class cabins, were situated on the Promenade, Upper, Saloon and Main Decks. There was also a Music Room, Smoke Room for gentlemen, and separate dining rooms for First and Second Class passengers. By the standard of the day, Second Class accommodation was moderate, but spacious and comfortable. RMS Etruria's accommodation consisted of 550 First Class, and 800 Second Class passengers. However late in 1892 this changed to 500 First Class, 160 Second Class, and 800 Third Class (Steerage) passengers.

== North Atlantic service ==
Front cover of a passenger list for a voyage of RMS Etruria

Cunard registered Etruria at Liverpool. Her United Kingdom official number was 91187 and her code letters were JTPM.

Just as Etruria was to start her regular service to New York from Liverpool at the beginning of 1885, a crisis involving Russia's threat to invade Afghanistan was coming to a head. This delayed Etruria's maiden voyage across the North Atlantic. On 26 March the Admiralty chartered Etruria and Umbria. With the dispute reaching a settlement, Etruria was released from Admiralty service within a few days, but her sister ship was retained for six months.

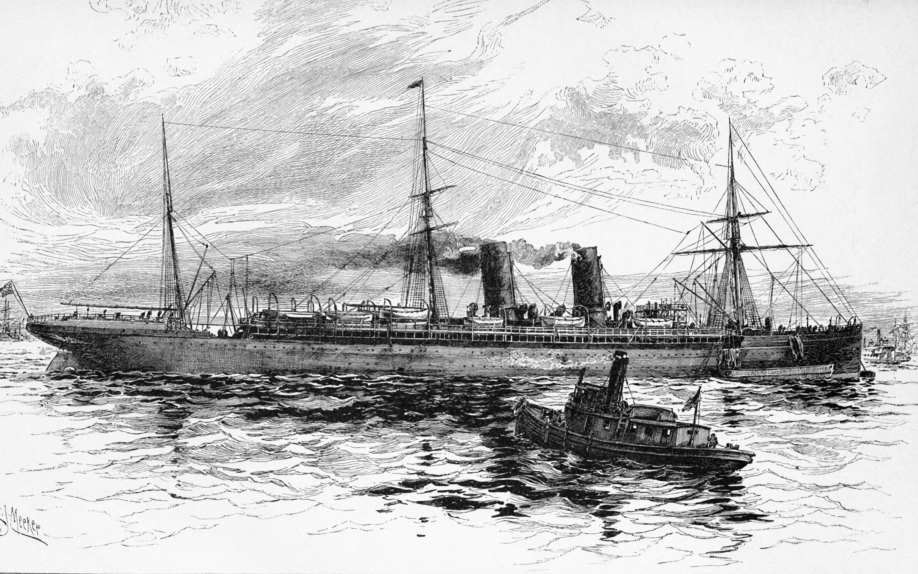
1891 Illustration of Etruria

On 25 April 1885 Etruria finally made her maiden voyage under the command of Captain McMicken. She made the Atlantic crossing calling at Queenstown (now Cobh). On her second crossing, westbound from Liverpool to New York, she won the Blue Riband (see the table below) and flew the pennant for Cunard.

On 20 September 1885, she was outward bound from New York and in Lower New York Bay, at anchor due to dense fog. The 4,276-ton cargo ship Canada, owned by the National Steamship Company of Limerick, collided with Etruria, on her starboard side. Canada scraped alongside Etruria, ripping away a portion of her rigging, but there were no casualties. Both ships continued on their voyages.

== Winston Churchill ==
In November 1895 Winston Churchill, then 20 years old and a lieutenant in the 4th Hussars, secured a few weeks' leave to visit Cuba, in order to observe the Cuban War of Independence against Spain. He traveled via Liverpool and New York on Etruria, reaching New York harbor on 9 November. Three days later he traveled on to Cuba. Churchill returned to Britain on 21 December 1895, again aboard Etruria.

== Ceres and Milfield ==
On 8 August 1896 Etruria sank the floating steam elevator Ceres (United States) in a collision in New York Bay.

On 10 December 1897 Etruria rescued the crew of the steamship Milfield which was foundering in heavy seas about 140 miles west of Fastnet Rock.

== Propeller shaft failures ==
On 6 January 1900, Etruria left Liverpool, and one week later she arrived in New York. On the 13th engineers were inspecting the ship, and on examination of the propeller shaft, they found cracks that were not there when the ship left Liverpool. Her sister ship had suffered a failure of her propeller shaft at sea in 1893, and to avoid the same fate Etruria was confined to her pier until a replacement shaft was shipped over from Britain. After the new shaft was fitted in New York, she departed on 17 February for the homeward bound service. In 1900 Etruria remained on the North Atlantic service while Umbria was requisitioned to carry troops to and from South Africa during the Boer War. By July 1900 both sisters were back on the North Atlantic service.

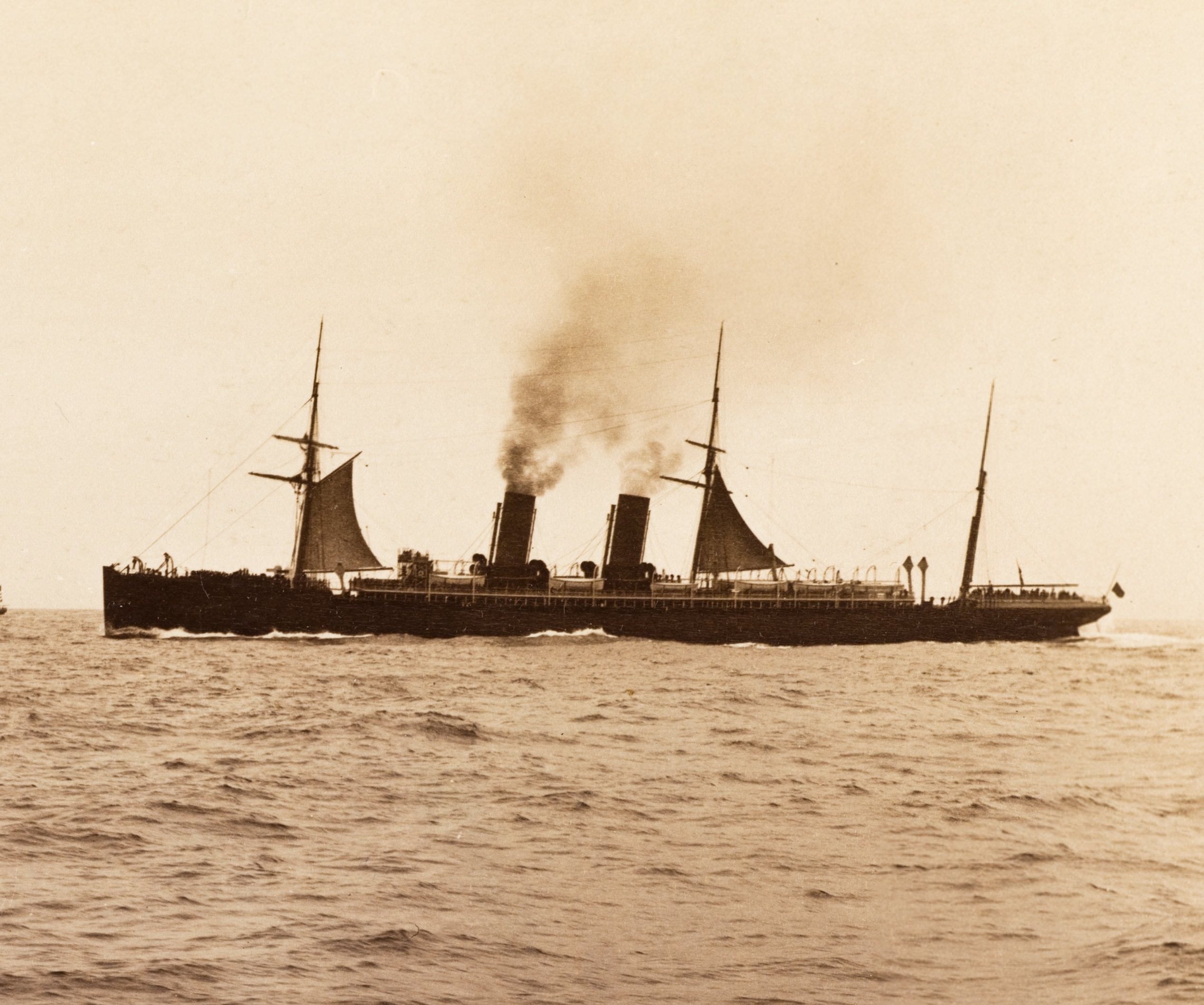
Etruria under steam and sail

In 1901 Etruria and her running mate were equipped for wireless telegraphy. On 22 February 1902, Etruria left New York and was due to arrive in Queenstown on 1 March. On 26 February she radioed Umbria to pass on messages to one of her passengers. However, that evening her propeller shaft fractured, leaving her drifting. She tried without success to radio Umbria again to report her predicament. In that era, wireless sets on many ships were not manned 24 hours a day. Eventually she attracted the attention of the Leyland Line ship William Cliff by firing distress rockets. William Cliff stood alongside in an hour and stayed with her during the night while attempts were made to repair her. Etruria then made sail and William Cliff took her in tow; the ships headed for Horta, in the Azores, which were 500 miles to the south-east of her stricken position.

She arrived in the Azores on Sunday, 9 March, and on the 15th her passengers and mail were transferred onto the steamship Elbe, which had been chartered for the task on the 10th. It was summer 1902 before Etruria was repaired and back in service, but in October, after a particularly rough Atlantic crossing, her propeller shaft again showed serious cracks and she was taken out of service and waited in New York for yet another new shaft to be sent over and installed. It was 1 November before she set sail for home again; 1902 had been a very bad year for the ship.

== More misfortune ==
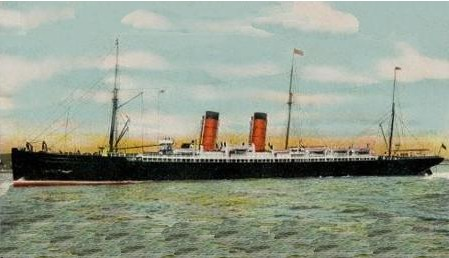
Postcard of Etruria

On 28 February 1903, Etruria was leaving New York when she ran aground on sand and mud in the entrance to Gedney Channel. After she was refloated later the same day there was no damage found and she set off on her voyage to Liverpool.

On 10 October 1903, Etruria was only four hours out of New York when at 2:30 pm the ship was struck by a rogue wave. The wave was reported to be at least 50 feet (15 meters) high, and struck the ship on the port side. The wave carried away part of the fore bridge and smashed the guardrail stanchions. A number of first-class passengers were sitting in deck chairs close to the bridge, and they caught the full force of the water. One passenger, a Canadian, was fatally injured, and several other passengers were hurt.

In January 1907 two of Etruria's crew were killed as they tried to secure the lashings of the starboard anchor in very rough weather, during a westbound crossing.

== The end of Etruria's career ==
The two 23-year-old vessels were now reaching the point where technical progress had overtaken them. RMS Lusitania and RMS Mauretania were under construction, and due to enter service in late 1907.

On Wednesday 26 August 1908, RMS Etruria was moving astern from her pier in Liverpool to anchor opposite the Princes' Landing Stage, where her passengers would embark. A hopper barge crossing the Mersey came too close to Etruria and was violently rammed by her. Etruria's rudder and propeller were thrust deep into the hopper, almost severing it in two. However, being impaled on Etruria's propeller prevented the hopper from sinking. Both vessels drifted helplessly in the Mersey for some time, and finished the career of Etruria. Her propeller, rudder and steering gear were seriously damaged, forcing the cancellation of her sailing to New York. Etruria's passengers were put up in hotels and then caught Umbria later in the week. Etruria was taken into dock, where temporary repairs were made. The hopper was repaired, sold off in 1938 and wrecked 1952.

She did not cross the Atlantic again and, after spending time laid up at Birkenhead, she was finally sold for £16,750 in October 1909. On 11 April 1910, the Mersey tug Black Cock towed Etruria to her final destination of Preston, Lancashire, where she was scrapped. Her sale for scrap was announced in mid November 1909. In January 1911 it was reported that over the past two years Thos. W. Ward alone had broken up five Cunarders: Lucania, Etruria, Aleppo, Saragosssa and Cherbourg and had five P & O boats in their yards during 1910.

== Popular culture ==
Etruria is the ocean liner in the opening sequences of Thomas Edison's produced, Edwin S. Porter directed, 1904 film The European Rest Cure.

Prices of passage aboard Etruria, May 1895
From Pier 40, North River, foot of Clarkson Street, City of New York
Every Saturday, New York – Queenstown – Liverpool
1st Class	1st Class	1st Class	1st Class Return	1st Class Return	1st Class Return	2nd Class Cabin	2nd Class Cabin	2nd Class Cabin Return	2nd Class Cabin Return	Under 1 Year old
$75	$90	$175	$125	$150	$315	$40	$45	$75	$85	Free outward

== The Blue Riband ==
Records of RMS Umbria & RMS Etruria
The Blue Riband of the North Atlantic
Westbound
Steamship	Date	Line	From	To	Nautical Miles	Days/Hours/Minutes	Knots
RMS Etruria	1885 (16/8- 22/8)	Cunard	Queenstown	Sandy Hook	2801	6/5/31	18.73
RMS Umbria	1887 (29/5-4/6)	Cunard	Queenstown	Sandy Hook	2848	6/4/12	19.22
RMS Etruria	1888 (27/5-2/6)	Cunard	Queenstown	Sandy Hook	2854	6/1/55	19.56
Eastbound
Steamship	Date	Line	From	To	Nautical Miles	Days/Hours/Minute	Knots
Etruria	1885 (1/8-7/8)	Cunard	Sandy Hook	Queenstown	2822	6/9/0	18.44
Etruria	1888 (7/7-14/7)	Cunard	Sandy Hook	Queenstown	2981	6/4/50	19.36

== Bibliography ==
- Lloyd's Register of British and Foreign Shipping. London: Lloyd's Register of Shipping. 1885. ETH – via Internet Archive.
- Lloyd's Register of British and Foreign Shipping. Vol. I–Steamers. London: Lloyd's Register of Shipping. 1906. ETO–EUP – via Internet Archive.

Records
Preceded by Oregon	Blue Riband (Eastbound record); 1885–1889	Succeeded by City of Paris
Preceded by Oregon	Blue Riband (Westbound record); 1885–1887	Succeeded by Umbria
Preceded by Umbria	Blue Riband (Westbound record); 1888–89	Succeeded by City of Paris
