= RMS Umbria =

1884 British ocean liner

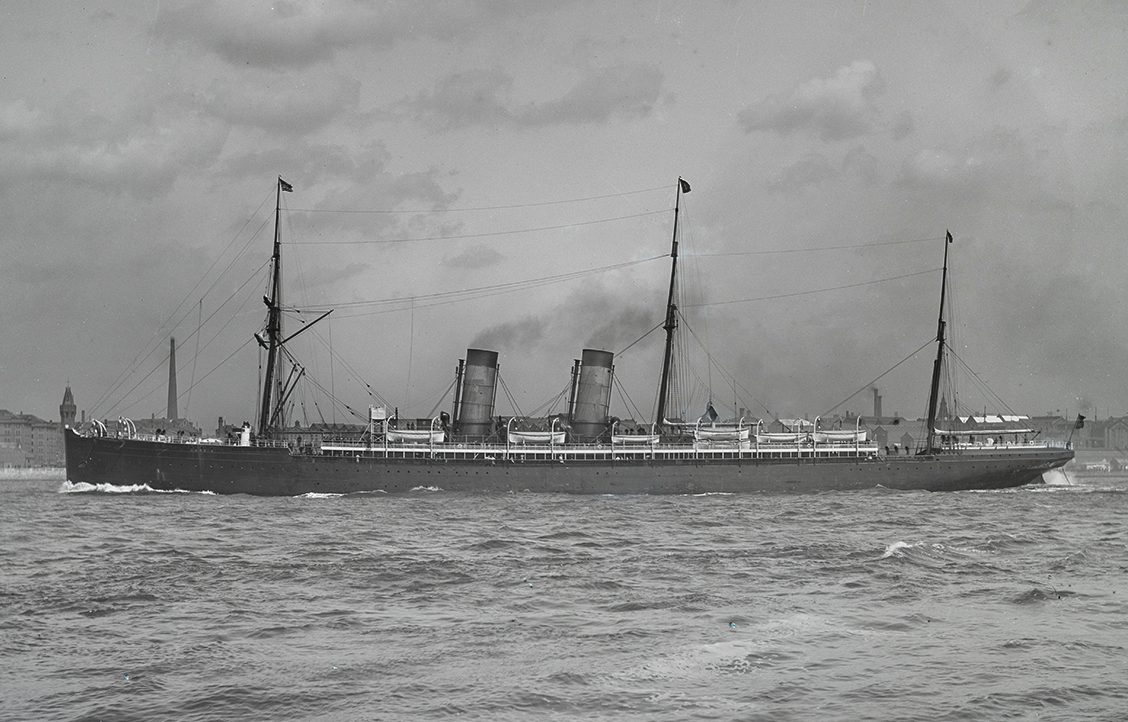
- RMS Umbria

History

United Kingdom
- Name: RMS Umbria
- Namesake: Umbria
- Owner: Cunard SS Co
- Operator: Cunard SS Co
- Port of registry: Liverpool
- Route: Liverpool – Queenstown – New York
- Ordered: 19 July 1883
- Builder: John Elder & Co, Govan
- Yard number: 285
- Launched: 25 June 1884
- Completed: 8 October 1884
- Maiden voyage: 1 November 1884
- In service: 1 November 1884
- Out of service: 1910
- Identification: UK official number 91159; code letters JPWV
- Fate: Scrapped 1910

General characteristics
- Type: Ocean liner
- Tonnage: 1884: 7,129 GRT, 3,268 NRT
- Length: 501.6 ft (152.9 m)
- Beam: 57.2 ft (17.4 m)
- Depth: 38.2 ft (11.6 m)
- Decks: 6
- Installed power: 1,559 NHP
- Propulsion: 3-cylinder compound engine
- Sail plan: or barquentine
- Speed: 19.5 knots (36.1 km/h; 22.4 mph)
- Capacity: 1885: 550 First Class; 800 Second Class; 1892: 500 First Class; 160 Second Class; 800 Third Class
- Crew: 560

RMS Umbria was a British ocean liner of the Cunard Line. She and her sister ship RMS Etruria were the last two Cunard express ocean liners that were fitted with auxiliary sails. Umbria was also the last express steamship to be built for a North Atlantic route with a compound engine. By 1885, the triple expansion engine was the almost universal specification for newly built steamships. John Elder & Co. built Umbria in Govan, Glasgow, in 1884.

Umbria and her running mate Etruria were record breakers. They were the largest liners then in service, and they plied the Liverpool – New York City route. Umbria was launched by the Honourable Mrs. Hope on 25 June 1884, with wide press coverage, because she was the largest ship afloat, apart from Great Eastern, which by that time was redundant.

== Building ==
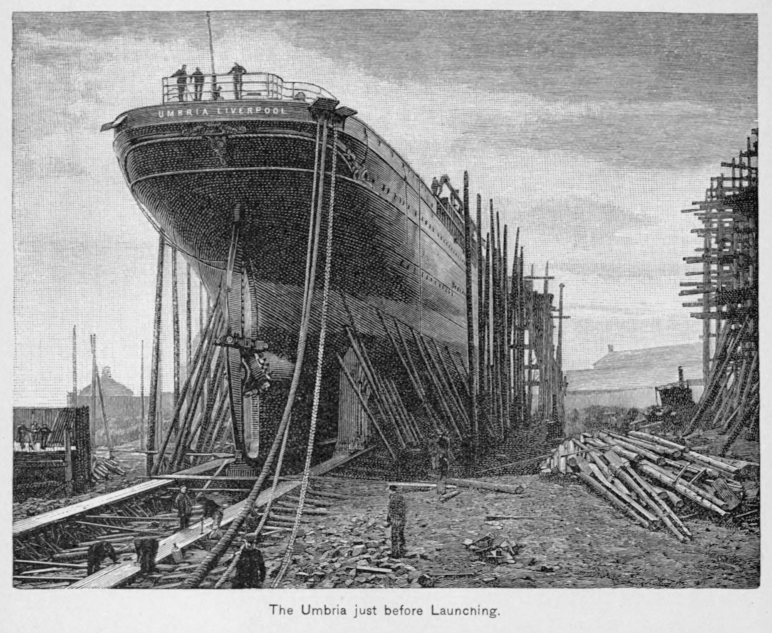
Umbria under construction

Umbria had two large funnels and three large steel masts that were barquentine-rigged. Another innovation was that she was equipped with refrigeration machinery, but it was her single-screw propulsion that would bring her the most publicity later in her career.

The ship epitomized the luxuries of Victorian style. The public rooms in the first class were full of ornately carved furniture, heavy velvet curtains hung in all the rooms, which were decorated with the bric-a-brac that period fashion dictated. The rooms and the first-class cabins were situated on the promenade, upper, saloon, and main decks. There was also a music room, a smoking room for gentlemen, and separate dining rooms for first- and second-class passengers. By the standard of the day, the second-class accommodation was modest but spacious and comfortable.

Cunard registered Umbria at Liverpool. Her United Kingdom official number was 91159 and her code letters were JPWV.

By 10 October 1884 she had been completed, and successfully performed her sea trials. On 1 November 1884, she set off to New York City on her maiden voyage, arriving on 10 November. She was commanded by Captain Theodore Cook, who was Cunard's senior captain.

== Liverpool-to-New York service ==
RMS Umbria started her regular service to New York City from Liverpool. However, a series of crises brought her North Atlantic service to a halt temporarily.

== Armed merchant cruiser ==
Since 1813, there had been tensions between the British Empire and the Russian Empire, due to Russia's southward expansion into Afghanistan. In March 1885, the Panjdeh incident caused a war scare and, on 26 March, the Admiralty chartered Umbria and RMS Etruria. Umbria was fitted out as an armed merchant cruiser. Shortly afterwards, the dispute with Russia was settled and Etruria was returned to the North Atlantic service, but Umbria was retained for a further six months as a precaution. She had been fitted with 5-inch (130 mm) guns and it was thought that, should the need arise, she would have been a powerful auxiliary to the new ironclad navy of the era.

== Return to service ==
In September 1885 Umbria was released from government service and resumed the Atlantic service. She worked for the next few years without any major incident.

Prices of passage aboard RMS Umbria, May 1895
From Pier 40, North River, foot of Clarkson Street, City of New York
Every Saturday, New York–Queenstown–Liverpool
1st class	1st class	1st class	1st class return	1st class return	1st class return	2nd class cabin	2nd class cabin	2nd class cabin return	2nd class cabin return	Under 1 year old
$75	$90	$175	$125	$150	$315	$40	$45	$75	$85	Free outward

== The Blue Riband ==
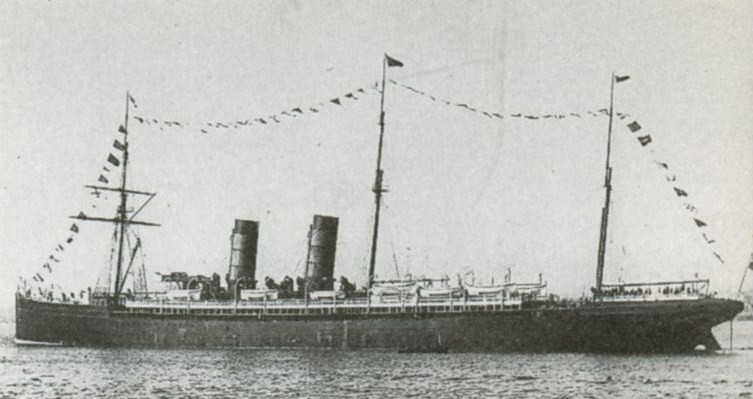
RMS Umbria on Queen Victoria's birthday in May 1889

In 1887, Umbria gained the prestigious Blue Riband for the fastest crossing of the Atlantic between Europe and North America. when, on 29 May, she beat her sister ship Etruria's record of the year before. She set off from Queenstown, Ireland to cross the North Atlantic, westbound. She reached Sandy Hook on 4 April, in 6 days 4 hours and 12 minutes, averaging a speed of 19.22 knots (35.60 km/h; 22.12 mph) and covering a distance of 2,848 nautical miles (5,274 km; 3,277 mi). Her sister, Etruria, regained the Blue Riband the following year. On 10 November 1888, Umbria was outward bound from New York when she collided with and sank the Fabre Line cargo steamship Iberia near Sandy Hook. Iberia's stern was completely cut off. The blame for the accident was placed upon Umbria which, it was claimed, was travelling at a dangerous speed, said to be 17 knots (31 km/h; 20 mph).

Records of RMS Umbria & RMS Etruria
The Blue Riband of the North Atlantic
Westbound
Steamship	Date	Line	From	To	Nautical miles	Days/hours/minutes	Knots
RMS Etruria	1885 (16/8- 22/8)	Cunard	Queenstown	Sandy Hook	2801	6/5/31	18.73
RMS Umbria	1887 (29/5-4/6)	Cunard	Queenstown	Sandy Hook	2848	6/4/12	19.22
RMS Etruria	1888 (27/5-2/6)	Cunard	Queenstown	Sandy Hook	2854	6/1/55	19.56

== Magdalena ==
On 12 April 1890 Umbria set off on her usual voyage from New York City with 655 passengers aboard. Five days out, in the mid-Atlantic, she sighted the stricken Norwegian barque Magdalena. The barque had struck an iceberg and was waterlogged. Umbria rescued Captain Gunderson and his crew of eight and, before abandoning ship, Gunderson finished off Magdalena by setting fire to her. All were landed safely at Liverpool four days later.

== Propeller shaft failure ==
On 17 December 1892, Umbria left Liverpool. After stopping at Queenstown, she had 400 passengers aboard, along with a large amount of mail. She was due to arrive in New York on Christmas Day. By 28 December, she still had not arrived and speculation as to what had delayed her was growing. On 29 December, news came from the steamship Galileo, which had passed her on Christmas Day. She appeared disabled. The master of Galileo also reported that she displayed three red lights, indicating that she was unmanageable, but did not require assistance. The weather was said to be foul, with a severe north-westerly gale. Another steamship, Monrovian, had also passed her but reported Umbria to be in good shape. On 30 December, the steamship Manhanset reported again that Umbria did not require assistance and that she was carrying out repairs to a broken shaft.

In fact Umbria's troubles had started on 23 December at around 5:25 p.m. Her propeller shaft had fractured at the thrust block. Her main engines were stopped immediately, and Umbria drifted helplessly in gale-force winds and a heavy sea. The chief engineer and his staff worked relentlessly to make repairs to the shaft. Later that day, at 8:15 pm, the steamship Bohemia had agreed to tow the ship to New York but, around 10 p.m., the line broke in the severe storm and visibility was nil. Next morning there was no sign of Bohemia, and once again Umbria was drifting helplessly. Then came the encounters with the other two steamships but, by 26 December, the Cunarder Gallia and Umbria had established contact with each other and after some communications between masters, Gallia had refused to stand by, and carried on her voyage, with Umbria left to make repairs. The chief engineer achieved that on 27 December and she set off very slowly for New York City. At 11 p.m. on 31 December 1892, her safe arrival was cheered by thousands of New Yorkers. When the excitement had died down the recriminations started, which ended when Cunard prepared a statement explaining why Gallia had continued on without assisting Umbria. Further repairs were carried out on Umbria and she returned to Liverpool on 4 February 1893. By 1 April, she was back on the service.

== Stuck in a wreck ==
In May 1896, the British steamship Vedra collided with and sank the coal-laden barge Andrew Jackson. At 9 a.m. on 28 June 1896, Umbria left her New York pier at the foot of Clarkson Street on the North River. After one hour she was in the ship channel near the turn into Gedney Channel, two miles (3 km) from Sandy Hook. There, Umbria struck the sunken wreck of Andrew Jackson and became stuck fast. She remained stuck all day until the combination of a flood tide and the efforts of seven tugs managed to free her from the wreck, to the cheers of the Yale rowing crew who were aboard Umbria on their way to take part in the Henley Regatta. She dropped anchor and divers reported no damage to the ship, so she continued on her voyage.

== The Boer War ==
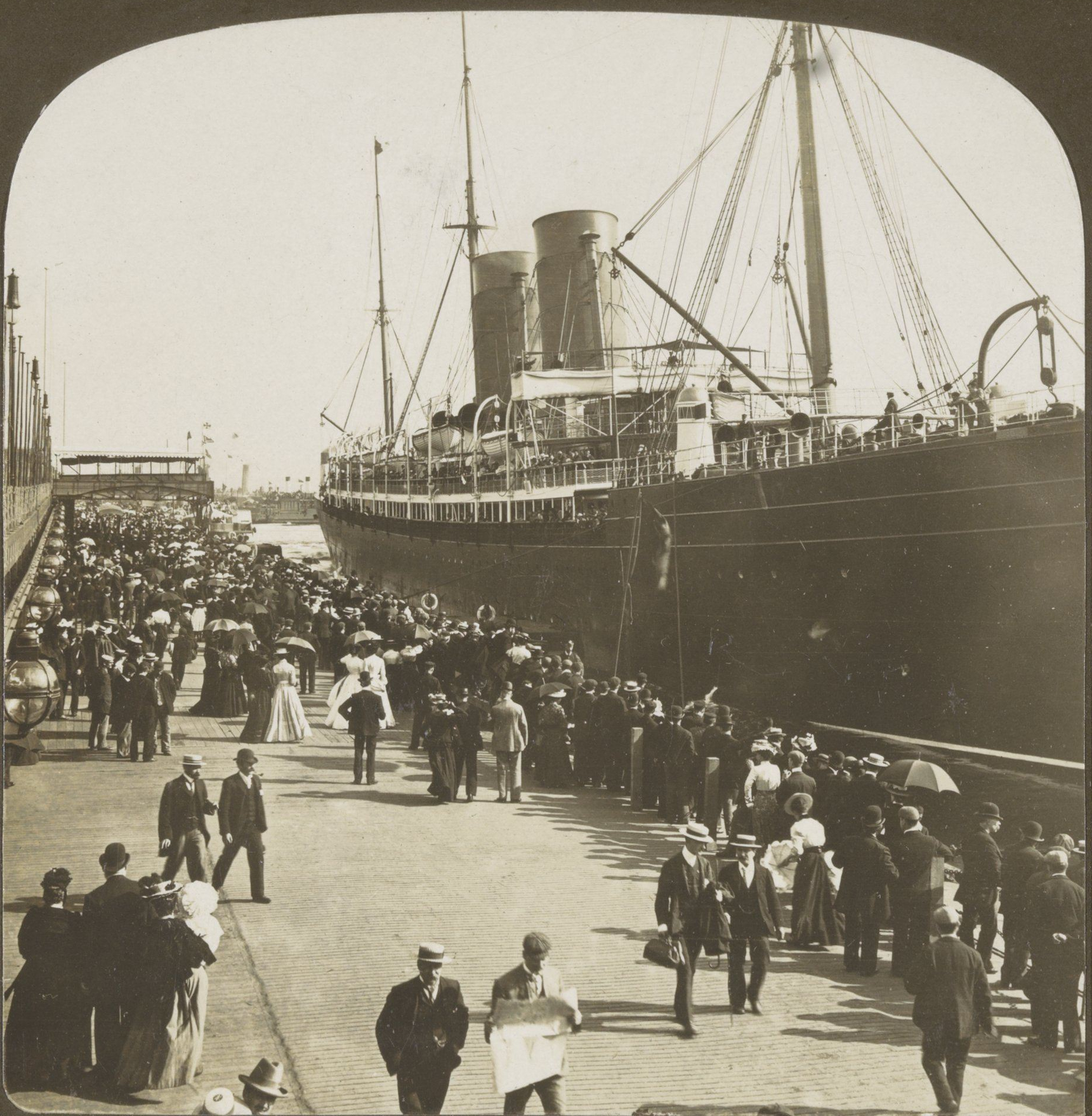
RMS Umbria leaving Liverpool for New York in 1902.

War broke out in South Africa on 12 October 1899, and two months later on 22 December the UK government chartered Umbria and had her prepared to carry troops and arms to South Africa. She set started her first voyage to South Africa on 11 January 1900. Aboard were troops of the Derbyshire, Durham Warwickshire Yeomanry. They reached Cape Town on 29 January and after calls at Port Elizabeth and other ports she returned to Southampton with wounded soldiers. In April she again was back in South Africa and during the relief of Mafeking she was in Port Natal (now Durban) for the celebrations. She left Cape Town for the last time on 7 June, carrying 600 wounded soldiers. She arrived back at Southampton 19 days later on 26 June, and she was then returned to Cunard to resume her normal role. She was given a complete refit and returned on the New York run on 21 July.

== Mafia bomb plot ==
Both Umbria and Etruria returned to the Liverpool – New York service. On 9 May 1903, the New York City Police Department received a letter that said a bomb had been loaded aboard Umbria. The letter said the bomb had been intended for the White Star Line's RMS Oceanic, but that the bombers had changed their minds because there were a large number of women and children aboard that ship. At noon that day, Umbria was still at her berth and she was due to sail. Immediately the police sealed off the pier head and told the captain to delay the sailing.

The police searched the ship and found the bomb. It was in a box three feet (91 cm) long by two feet (61 cm) wide and had been placed near the first-class gangway. One of the police officers tied a rope around the box and lowered it into the sea. When the box was lifted back up and opened, it was found to have 100 lb (45 kg) of dynamite attached to a crude timed fuse. If the bomb had exploded on the ship it would have caused considerable damage. The letter that the police had received also explained that the bomb plot was the work of the Mafia, whose aim was to destroy the British shipping interest in the port of New York. To corroborate that information, the police had descriptions of two "Italian" men placing the bomb on the pier, and the police eventually traced the manufacturer of the bomb back to a Chicago lodging house. The ship eventually got under way to Liverpool on 16 May.

== Last voyage ==
By 1908, the careers of Umbria and Etruria were coming to an end. However, because of mishaps to, first, Etruria and then to RMS Lucania, which was temporarily laid up and later caught fire, Umbria had a reprieve until 1910. Her last voyage started on 12 February 1910 and her return crossing on 23 February. She arrived in the Mersey for the last time on 4 March 1910 and, as soon as her passengers had disembarked, work began on dismantling all her fixtures and fittings. Within days, she was sold for scrap to the Forth Shipbreaking Company for £20,000, and she was taken to Bo'ness, Scotland. In all, she had made 145 round trips to New York.

== In popular culture ==
The ship is featured briefly in the last several episodes of the third and final season of the 2014 horror-drama television series Penny Dreadful. When the characters Sir Malcolm Murray, Ethan Chandler, and Kaetenay are returning to London from the United States, they are travelling aboard Umbria, as is clear from the vessel's appearance, and the name on a life-preserver on the ship.

== Bibliography ==
- Lloyd's Register of British and Foreign Shipping. London: Lloyd's Register of Shipping. 1885. ULY – via Internet Archive.
- Lloyd's Register of British and Foreign Shipping. Vol. I–Steamers. London: Lloyd's Register of Shipping. 1906. ULU-UMG – via Internet Archive.

Records
Preceded by Etruria	Holder of the Blue Riband (Westbound); 1887–1888	Succeeded by Etruria
