= RMS Olympic =

British ocean liner from 1911 to 1935

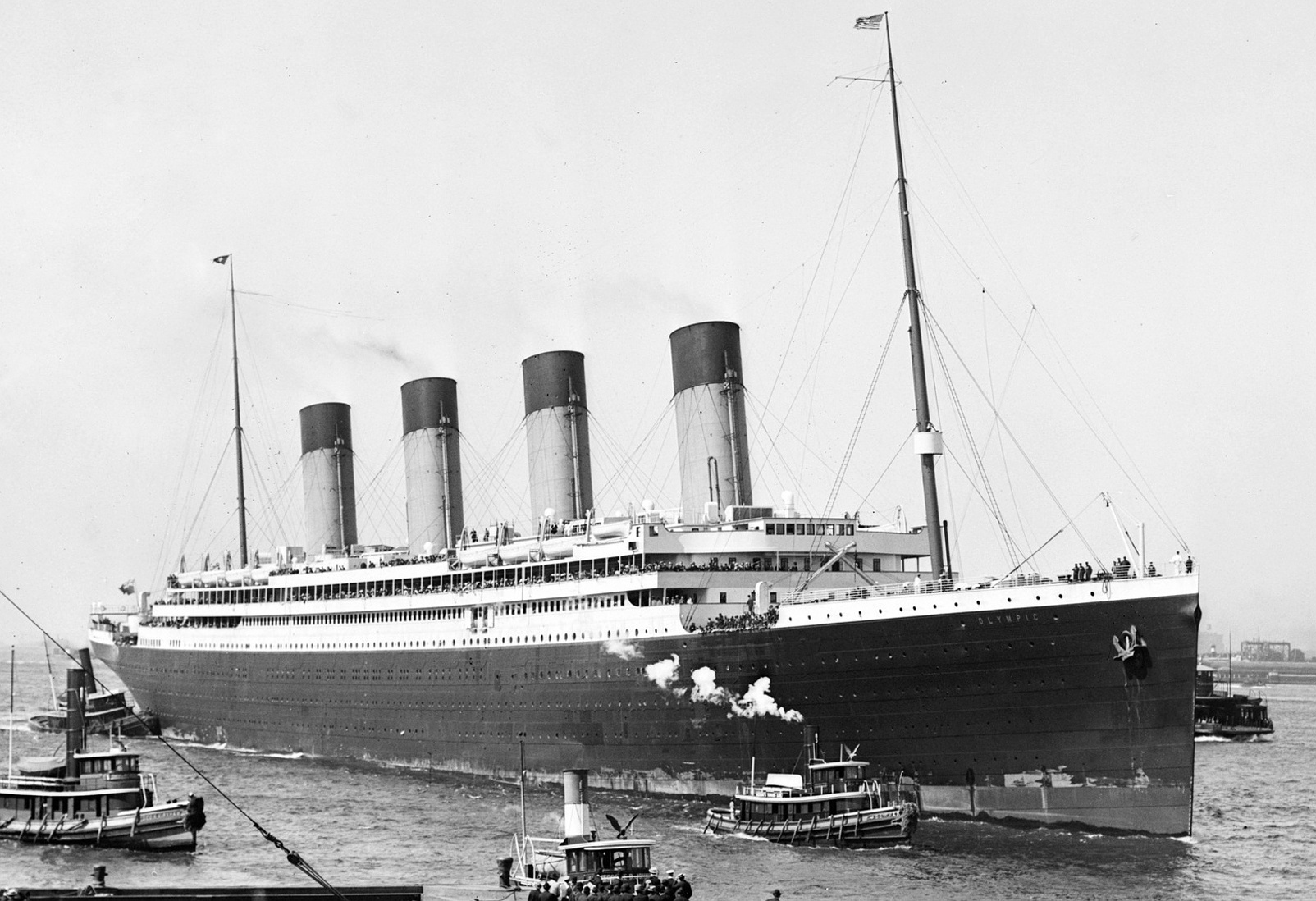
- RMS Olympic arriving at New York on her maiden voyage, 21 June 1911

History

United Kingdom
- Name: RMS Olympic
- Owner: White Star Line 1911–34; Cunard-White Star Line 1934–35
- Operator: White Star Line 1911–34; Cunard-White Star Line 1934–35
- Port of registry: Liverpool
- Route: Southampton – Cherbourg – Queenstown – New York City
- Ordered: 1907
- Builder: Harland & Wolff, Belfast
- Cost: $7.5 million (USD)
- Yard number: 400
- Way number: 347
- Laid down: 16 December 1908
- Launched: 20 October 1910
- Completed: 31 May 1911
- Maiden voyage: 14 June 1911
- In service: 1911–1935
- Out of service: 12 April 1935
- Identification: UK official number 131346; Code letters HSRP (until 1933); Wireless call sign MKC (until 1933); Call sign GLSQ (1930 onward)
- Nickname(s): "Old Reliable"
- Fate: Scrapped 1935–37

General characteristics
- Class & type: Olympic-class ocean liner
- Type: Passenger ship
- Tonnage: 45,324 gross register tons (1911); 46,439 (1913); 46,439 (1920). 20,894 to 22,350 net register tons
- Displacement: 52,067 tons
- Length: 882 ft 9 in (269.1 m)
- Beam: 92 ft 9 in (28.3 m)
- Height: 175 ft (53.4 m) (keel to top of funnels)
- Draught: 34 ft 7 in (10.5 m)
- Decks: 9 decks (8 for passengers and 1 for crew)
- Installed power: 24 double-ended (six furnace) and 5 single-ended (three furnace) Scotch boilers originally coal burning, later converted to oil fired in 1919. Two four-cylinder triple-expansion reciprocating engines each producing 15,000 hp for the two outboard wing propellers at 85 revolutions per minute. One low-pressure turbine producing 16,000 hp.
- Propulsion: Two bronze three-bladed wing propellers. One bronze four-bladed centre propeller.
- Speed: 22 knots (41 km/h; 25 mph) (service)
- Capacity: 2,435 passengers
- Crew: 950 (1911)

RMS Olympic was a British ocean liner and the lead ship of the White Star Line's trio of Olympic-class liners. Olympic had a career spanning 24 years from 1911 to 1935, in contrast to her short-lived sister ships, RMS Titanic and the Royal Navy hospital ship HMHS Britannic.

Launched in 1910, Olympic saw service as a troopship with the name HMT Olympic during the First World War, which gained her the nickname "Old Reliable", and during which she rammed and sank the U-boat U-103. She returned to civilian service after the war and served successfully as an ocean liner throughout the 1920s and into the first half of the 1930s, although increased competition, and the slump in trade during the Great Depression after 1930, made her operation increasingly unprofitable. Olympic was withdrawn from service on 12 April 1935, and later sold for scrap, which was completed by 1939.

Olympic was the largest ocean liner in the world for two periods during 1910–13, interrupted only by the brief service life (six-day maiden voyage in April 1912) of the slightly larger Titanic, which had the same dimensions but higher gross register tonnage, before the German SS Imperator went into service in June 1913. Olympic also held the title of the largest British-built liner until RMS Queen Mary was launched in 1934, interrupted only by the short career of Titanic; Britannic, intended as a liner, instead served as a Royal Navy hospital ship for her 11-month life (December 1915 to November 1916), sinking when she struck a mine.

== Background and construction ==
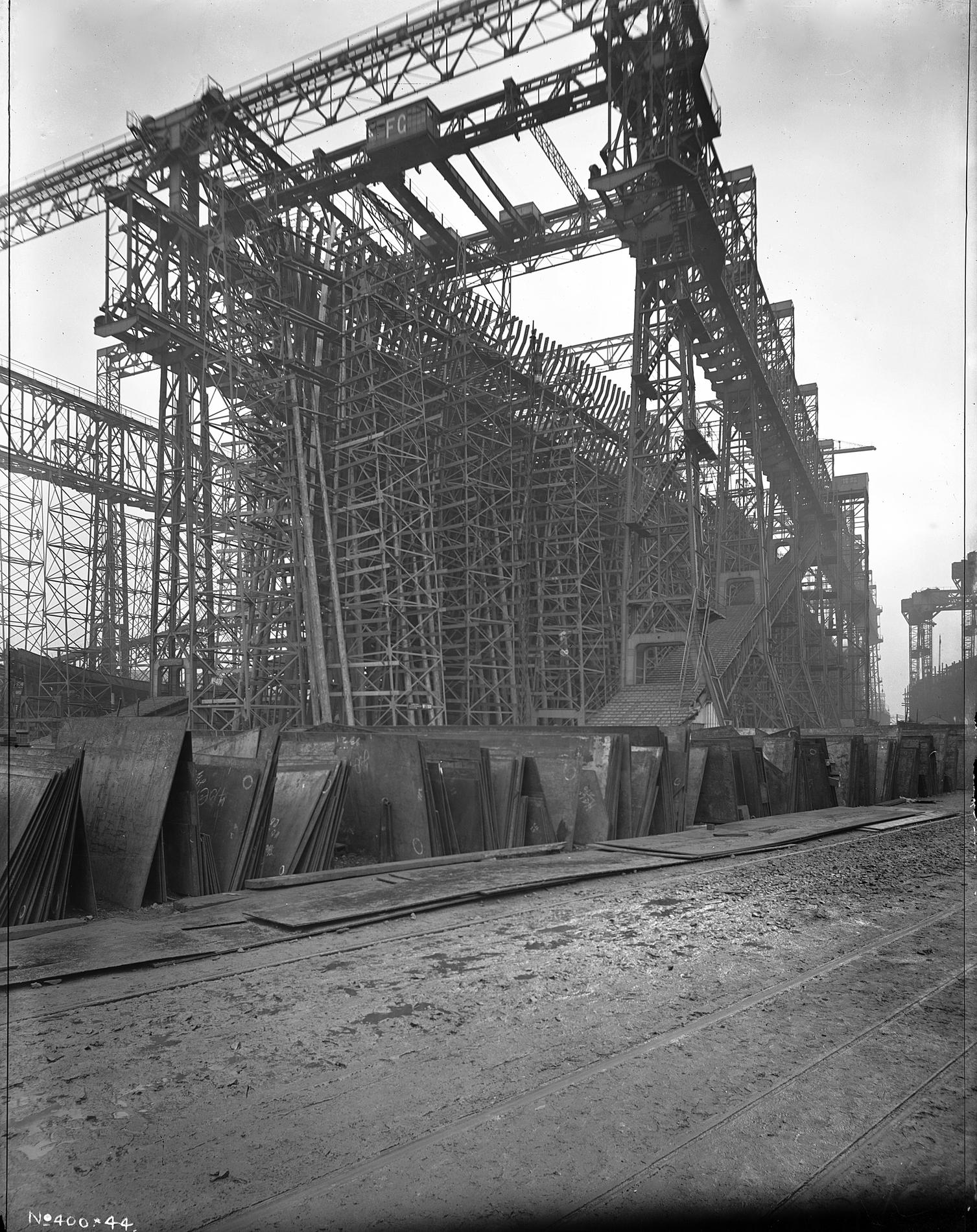
Olympic under construction, c. 1909. The Arrol Gantry can be seen towering over the ship. Titanic's keel is visible to the left.

Built in Belfast, Ireland, Olympic was the first of three Olympic-class ocean liners – the others being Titanic and Britannic. They were the largest vessels built for the British shipping company White Star Line, which had a fleet of 29 steamers and tenders in 1912. The three ships had their genesis in a discussion in mid-1907 between the White Star Line's chairman, J. Bruce Ismay, and the American financier J. Pierpont Morgan, who controlled the White Star Line's parent corporation, the International Mercantile Marine Co. The White Star Line faced a growing challenge from its main rivals Cunard, which had just launched Lusitania and Mauretania – the fastest passenger ships then in service – and the German lines Hamburg America and Norddeutscher Lloyd. Ismay preferred to compete on size and economics rather than speed and proposed to commission a new class of liners that would be bigger than anything that had gone before as well as being the last word in comfort and luxury. The company sought an upgrade in their fleet primarily in response to the largest Cunarders but also to replace their largest and now outclassed ships from 1890, RMS Teutonic and RMS Majestic. The former was replaced by Olympic while Majestic was replaced by Titanic. Majestic would be brought back into her old spot on White Star's New York service after Titanic's loss.

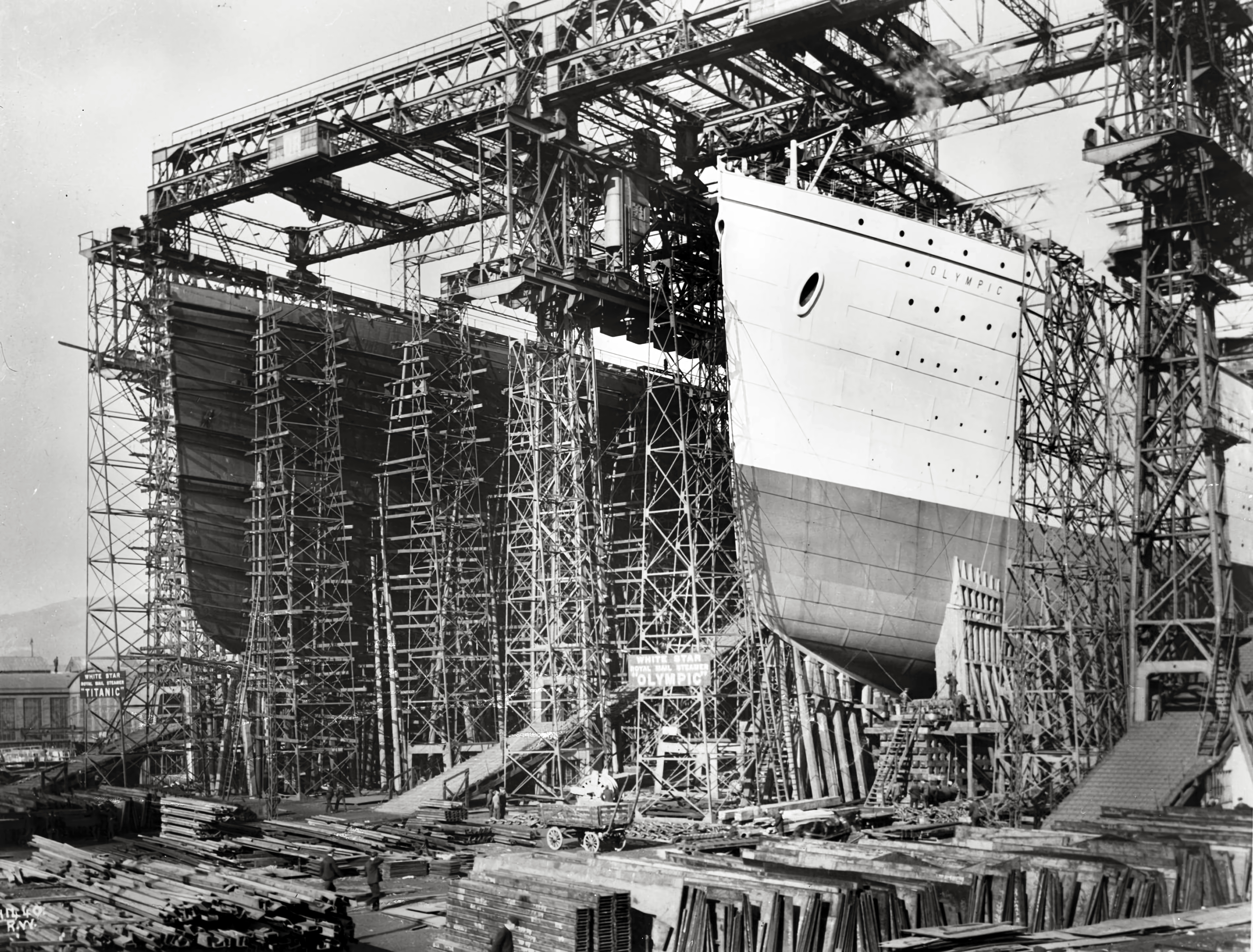
Olympic painted grey and ready for launching, c. 1910. Titanic, under construction, is visible to the left.

The ships were built in Belfast by Harland & Wolff, who had a long-established relationship with the White Star Line dating back to 1867. Harland & Wolff were given a great deal of latitude in designing ships for the White Star Line; the usual approach was for the latter to sketch out a general concept which the former would take away and turn into a ship design. Cost considerations were relatively low on the agenda and Harland & Wolff was authorised to spend what it needed on the ships, plus a five per cent profit margin. In the case of the Olympic-class ships, a cost of £3 million for the first two ships was agreed plus "extras to contract" and the usual five per cent fee.

Harland & Wolff's design work for the Olympic-class vessels was overseen by Lord Pirrie, a director of both Harland & Wolff and the White Star Line; naval architect Thomas Andrews, the managing director of Harland & Wolff's design department; Edward Wilding, Andrews' deputy and responsible for calculating the ship's design, stability and trim; and Alexander Carlisle, the shipyard's chief draughtsman and general manager. Carlisle's responsibilities included the decorations, equipment and all general arrangements, including the implementation of an efficient lifeboat davit design.

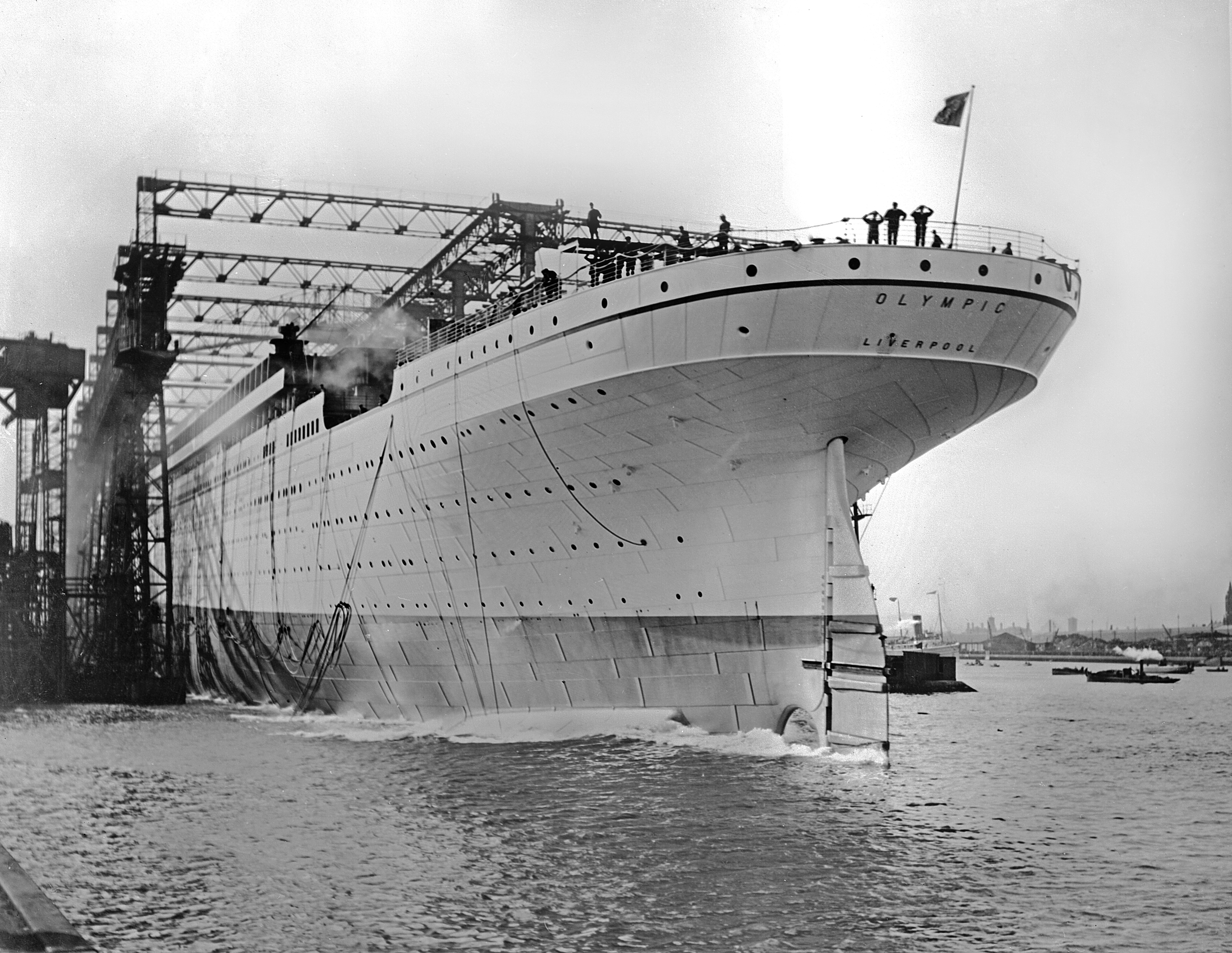
The launch of Olympic, on 20 October 1910

On 29 July 1908, Harland & Wolff presented the drawings to Bruce Ismay and other White Star Line executives. Ismay approved the design and signed three "letters of agreement" two days later authorising the start of construction. At this point the lead ship – which was later to become Olympic – had no name, but was referred to simply as "Number 400", as it was Harland & Wolff's four hundredth hull. Titanic was based on a revised version of the same design and was given the number 401. Bruce Ismay's father Thomas Henry Ismay had previously planned to build a ship named Olympic as a sister ship to Oceanic. The senior Ismay died in 1899 and the order for the ship was cancelled.

Construction of Olympic began three months before Titanic to ease pressures on the shipyard. Several years would pass before Britannic would be launched. To accommodate the construction of the class, Harland & Wolff upgraded their facility in Belfast; the most dramatic change was the combining of three slipways into two larger ones, allowing Olympic and Titanic to be constructed side by side. Olympic's keel was laid on 16 December 1908 and she was launched on 20 October 1910, without having been christened beforehand. By tradition, the White Star Line never christened any of their vessels and for the launch the hull was painted in a light grey colour for photographic purposes; a common practice of the day for the first ship in a new class, as it made the lines of the ship clearer in the black-and-white photographs. The launch was filmed both in black and white and in Kinemacolor, with only the black and white footage surviving. The launches of Titanic and Britannic were also filmed, though only Britannic's survived. Olympic's hull was repainted black following the launch.

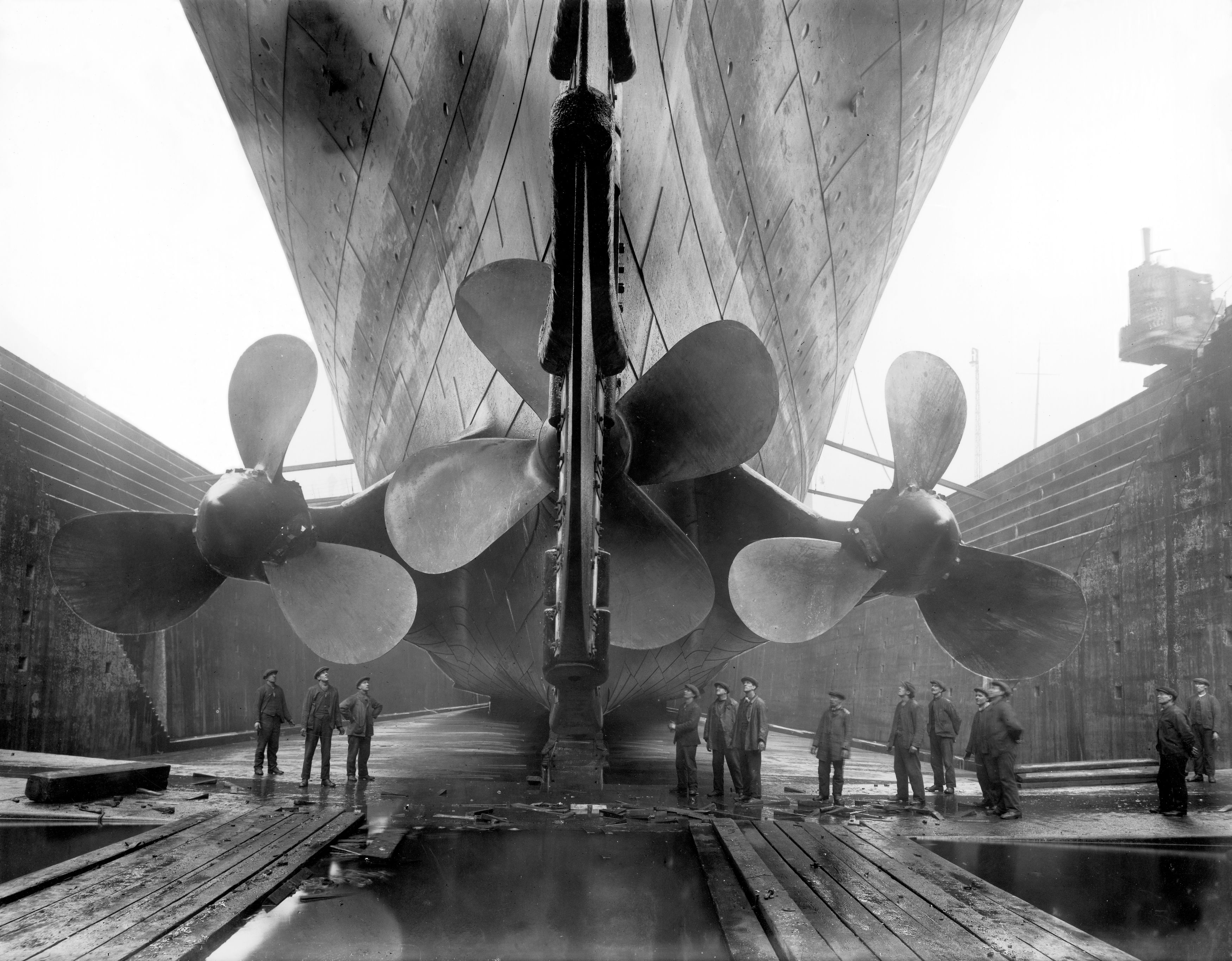
Olympic's propellers (1924)

On 1 April 1911, Olympic was pulled into Thompson Graving Dock as part of its opening ceremony. Here, the hull was cleaned and painted. It was also the place where she received her propellers.

Olympic was fitted with three propellers. The two three-bladed wing propellers were driven by two triple-expansion engines, while the four-bladed central propeller was powered by a turbine that used recovered steam escaping from the triple-expansion engines. The use of escaped steam was tested on the SS Laurentic two years earlier.

== Lifeboats ==
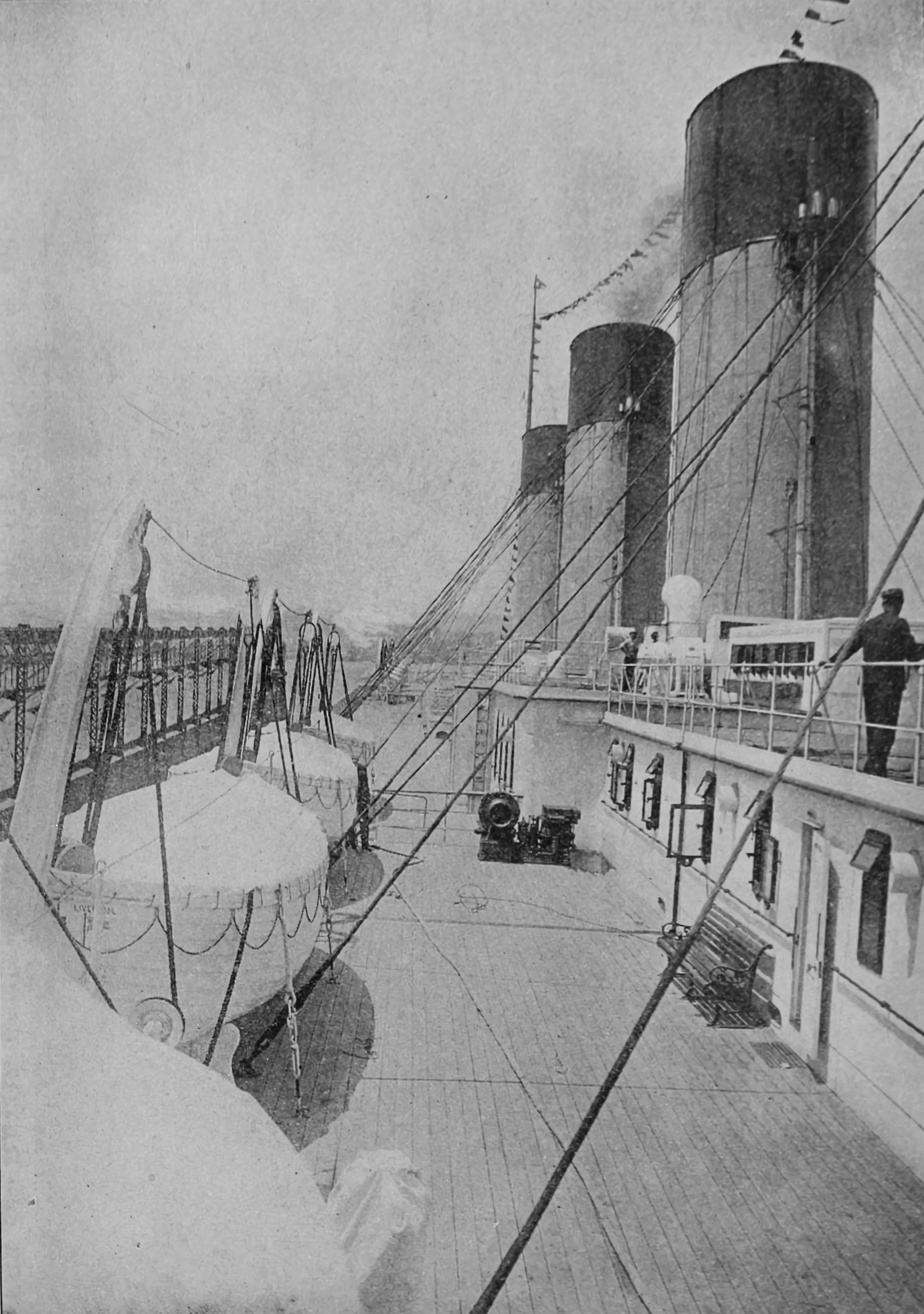
The boat deck of Olympic, with her original lifeboat configuration, seen from the ship's starboard side

Olympic's lifeboat arrangement in 1911–12 was identical to Titanic's – fourteen regulation boats, two emergency cutters and the White Star complement of four collapsible boats. Two collapsibles were stored (collapsibles C and D) broken down under the lead boats on the port and starboard sides. The final two collapsibles were stored on the top of the officers' quarters on either side of the number one funnel. Collapsibles A and B were stored on the starboard and port sides of the funnel respectively.

After the 1913 refit, Olympic now carried 68 lifeboats, enough for all aboard.

== Features ==
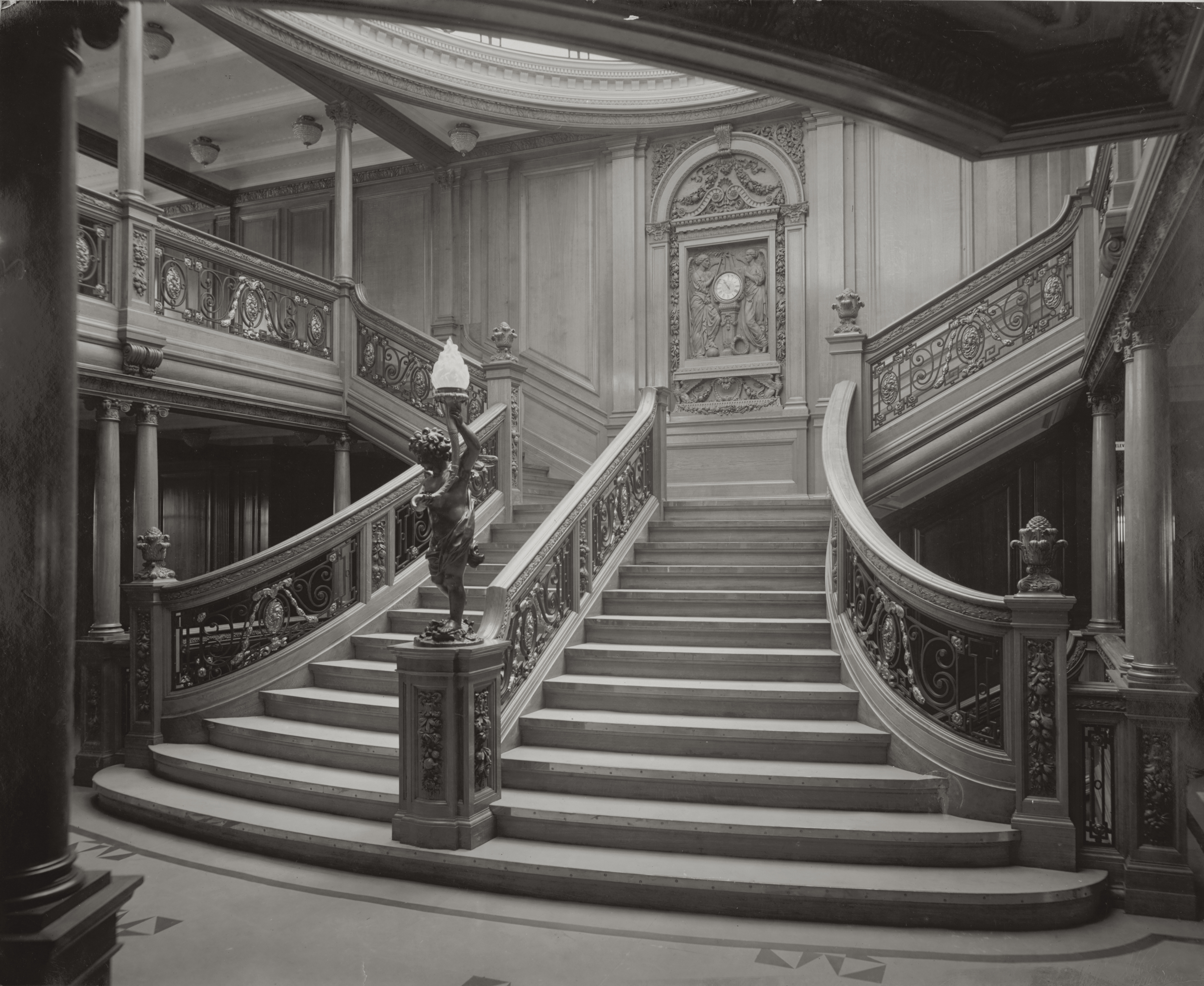
The Grand Staircase of Olympic

Olympic was designed as a luxury ship; Titanic's passenger facilities, fittings, deck plans and technical facilities were largely identical to Olympic, although with some small variations. The finest first-class staterooms were located on B deck and C deck, including four parlour suites and many staterooms equipped with private bathrooms. First-class passengers could have meals in the Jacobean-style main dining saloon or in the more intimate A La Carte Restaurant, completed in the style of the Louis XVI period. Meals in the Restaurant were at an additional cost, but passengers who elected to take all their meals in the Restaurant were given a rebate on their fare. The first-class accommodations were connected by two Grand Staircases, which became distinctive features of the Olympic-class ships. The forward Grand Staircase ran from the Boat Deck to F deck, including three lifts which ran behind the staircase from A deck to E deck. The slightly simpler aft Grand Staircase connected A to C deck. The first-class public rooms included a Georgian-style smoking room, a veranda café and palm court, a swimming pool, Victorian Turkish bath, indoor squash and racquet court, gymnasium, and Adam-style reading and writing Room. In additional to the main lounge on A deck, Olympic also featured a large Jacobean-style reception room adjoining the main dining saloon.

The second-class facilities included a smoking room, a library, a spacious dining room, and a lift.

Finally, the third-class passengers enjoyed reasonable accommodation compared to other ships. Instead of large dormitories offered by most ships of the time, the third-class passengers of Olympic travelled in cabins containing two to ten bunks. Facilities for the third class included a smoking room, a general room, an enclosed common area, and a dining room.

Olympic had a cleaner, sleeker look than other ships of the day: rather than fitting her with bulky exterior air vents, Harland & Wolff used smaller air vents with electric fans, with a "dummy" fourth funnel used for additional ventilation. For the power plant Harland & Wolff employed a combination of reciprocating engines with a centre low-pressure turbine, as opposed to the steam turbines used on Cunard's Lusitania and Mauretania. White Star had successfully tested this engine configuration on the earlier liner SS Laurentic, where it was found to be more economical than expansion engines or turbines alone. Olympic consumed 650 tons of coal per 24 hours with an average speed of 21.7 knots on her maiden voyage, compared to 1,000 tons of coal per 24 hours for both Lusitania and Mauretania.

== Differences from Titanic ==
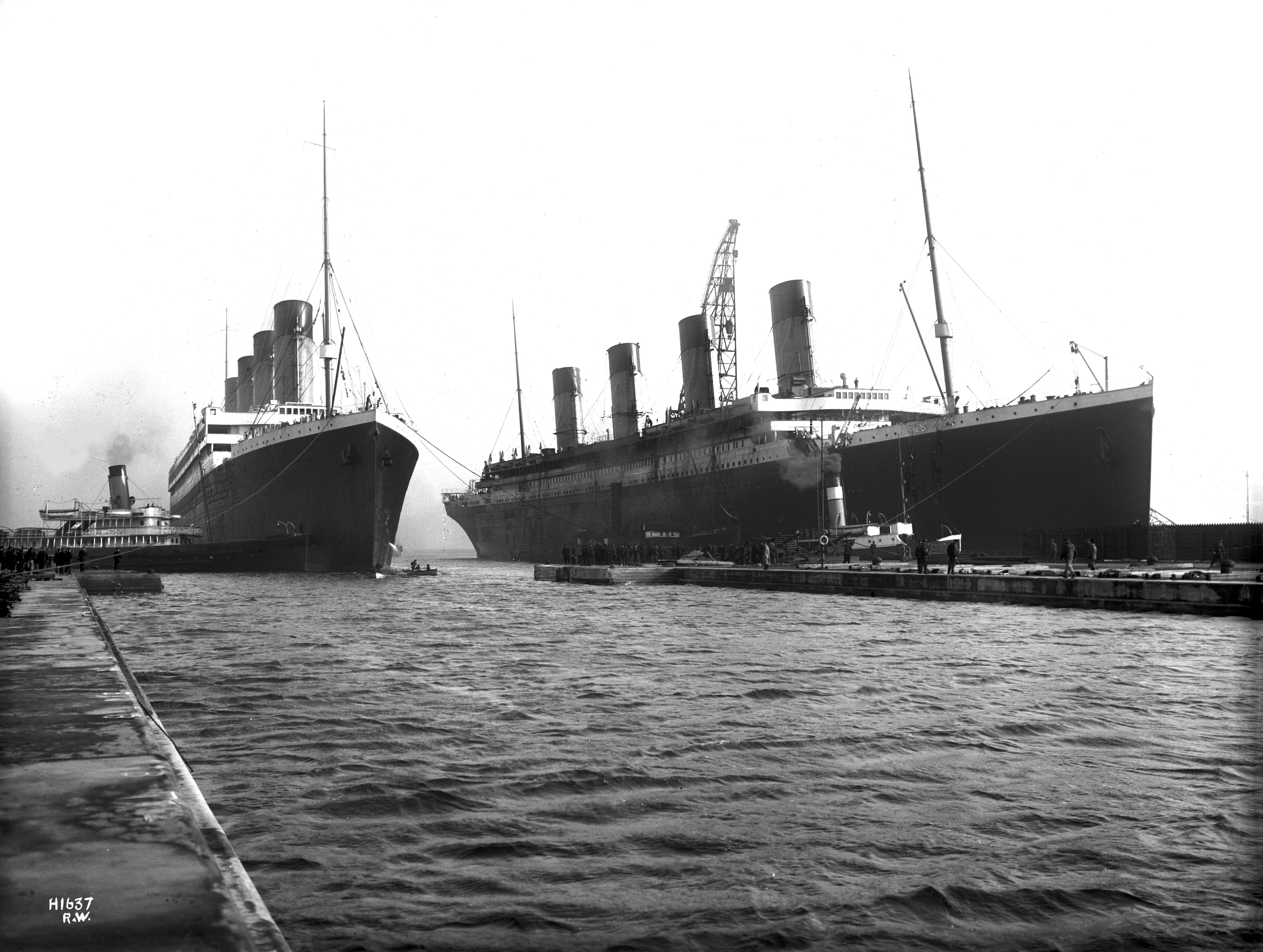
Olympic (left) being manoeuvred into Thompson Graving Dock in Belfast for repairs on the morning of 2 March 1912 after throwing a propeller blade. Titanic (right) is moored at the fitting-out wharf. Olympic would sail for Southampton on 7 March, concluding the last time the two ships would be photographed together.

The Olympic and Titanic were nearly identical, and were based on the same core design. A few alterations were made to Titanic and later on Britannic which were based on experience gained from Olympic's first year in service. The most noticeable of these was that the forward half of Titanic's A Deck promenade was enclosed by a steel screen with sliding windows, whereas Olympic's promenade deck remained open along its whole length. The additional enclosed volume was a major contributor to Titanic's increased gross register tonnage of 46,328 tons over Olympic's 45,324 tons, which allowed Titanic to claim the title of largest ship in the world.

Additionally, the B-Deck First-Class promenade decks installed on Olympic had proven to be scarcely used because of the already ample promenade space on A-Deck. Accordingly, Thomas Andrews eliminated this feature on Titanic and built additional, enlarged staterooms with en-suite bathrooms. It also allowed a Café Parisien in the style of a French pavement café to be added as an annexe to the À la Carte Restaurant, and for the Restaurant itself to be expanded to the Port-side of the ship. One drawback of this was that the Second-Class promenade space on B-Deck was reduced aboard Titanic.

A reception area for the restaurant was added in the foyer of the B-Deck aft Grand Staircase on Titanic, which did not exist on Olympic, and the main reception room on D-Deck was also slightly enlarged. 50-foot (15 m) private promenade decks were added to the two luxury parlour suites on B-Deck on Titanic, as well as additional First-Class gangway entrances on B-Deck. Cosmetic differences also existed between the two ships, most noticeably concerning the wider use of Axminster carpeting in Titanic's public rooms, as opposed to the more durable linoleum flooring on Olympic.

Most of these shortcomings on Olympic would be addressed in her 1913 refit, which altered the configuration of Olympic's First-Class sections to be more like those of Titanic. Although the A-Deck Promenade remained open for the entirety of Olympic's career, the B-Deck promenade was vetoed and staterooms added like those on Titanic, as well as a Café Parisien and enlarged restaurant. The 1913 refit also included modifications for greater safety after the loss of the Titanic, including the addition of extra lifeboats and the addition of an inner watertight skin in the hull along about half the length of the ship. An extra watertight compartment was added bringing the total of watertight compartments to 17. Five watertight bulkheads were raised to B deck. Along with these improvements there were many others included in the 1913 refit.

== Career ==
Following completion, Olympic started her sea trials on 29 May 1911 during which her manoeuvrability, compass, and wireless telegraphy were tested. No speed test was carried out. She completed her sea trial successfully. Olympic then left Belfast bound for Liverpool, her port of registration, on 31 May 1911. As a publicity stunt the White Star Line timed the start of this first voyage to coincide with the launch of Titanic. After spending a day in Liverpool, open to the public, Olympic sailed to Southampton, where she arrived on 3 June, to be made ready for her maiden voyage. Her arrival generated enthusiasm from her crew and newspapers. The deep-water dock at Southampton, then known as the "White Star Dock" had been specially constructed to accommodate the new Olympic-class liners, and had opened in 1911.

Her maiden voyage commenced on 14 June 1911 from Southampton, calling at Cherbourg and Queenstown, and reaching New York City on 21 June, with 1,313 passengers on board (489 first class, 263 second class and 561 third class). The maiden voyage was captained by Edward Smith. Designer Thomas Andrews was present for the passage to New York and return, along with a number of engineers with Bruce Ismay and Harland and Wolff's "Guarantee Group" who were also aboard for them to spot any problems or areas for improvement. Smith and Andrews would also be on board for Titanic's ill-fated maiden voyage the following year where both men went down with the ship.

As the largest ship in the world, and the first in a new class of superliners, Olympic's maiden voyage attracted considerable worldwide attention from the press and public. Following her arrival in New York, Olympic was opened up to the public and received over 8,000 visitors. More than 10,000 spectators watched her depart from New York harbour, for her first return trip. There were 2,301 passengers on board for the return voyage (731 first class, 495 second class and 1,075 third class). During her third crossing, Leonard Peskett, senior naval architect for Cunard Line was on board, in search of ideas for their new ship then under construction, the Aquitania.

=== Hawke collision ===
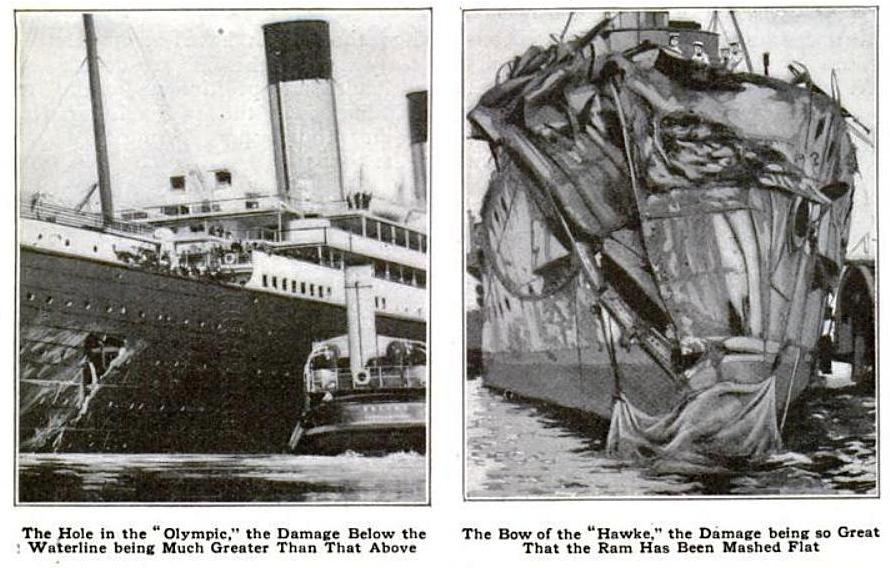
Images documenting the damage to Olympic (left) and Hawke (right) following their collision (other view here)

Olympic's first major mishap occurred on her fifth voyage on 20 September 1911, when she collided with the British cruiser HMS Hawke. The collision took place as Olympic and Hawke were running parallel to each other through the Solent. As Olympic turned to starboard, the wide radius of her turn took the commander of Hawke by surprise, and he was unable to take sufficient avoiding action. Hawke's bow, which had been designed to sink ships by ramming them, collided with Olympic's starboard side near the stern, tearing two large holes in Olympic's hull, above and below the waterline, resulting in the flooding of two of her watertight compartments and a twisted propeller shaft. Olympic settled slightly by the stern, but in spite of the damage was able to return to Southampton under her own power; no one was killed or seriously injured. HMS Hawke suffered severe damage to her bow and nearly capsized; Hawke was repaired, but sunk by the German U-boat SM U-9 in October 1914.

Captain Edward Smith was in command of Olympic at the time of the incident. Two crew members, stewardess Violet Jessop and stoker Arthur Priest, survived not only the collision with Hawke but also the later sinking of Titanic and the 1916 sinking of Britannic, the third ship of the class.

At the subsequent inquiry the Royal Navy blamed Olympic for the incident, alleging that her large displacement generated a suction that pulled Hawke into her side. The Hawke incident was a financial disaster for Olympic's operator. A legal argument ensued which decided that the blame for the incident lay with Olympic and, although the ship was technically under the control of the harbour pilot, the White Star Line was faced with large legal bills and the cost of repairing the ship, and keeping her out of revenue service made matters worse. However, the fact that Olympic endured such a serious collision and stayed afloat appeared to vindicate the design of the Olympic-class liners, and reinforced their "unsinkable" reputation.

It took two weeks for the damage to Olympic to be patched up sufficiently to allow her to return to Belfast for permanent repairs, which took just over six weeks to complete. To expedite repairs, Harland and Wolff made the decision to replace Olympic's damaged propeller shaft with one from Titanic, delaying the latter's completion. By 20 November 1911 Olympic was back in service.

On 24 February 1912, Olympic suffered another setback when she lost a propeller blade on an eastbound voyage from New York. At the time, the extension of Southampton's Trafalgar Graving Dock was not yet completed. Olympic therefore had to return to Thompson Graving Dock at Belfast for repairs. To return her to service as soon as possible, Harland & Wolff again had to pull resources from Titanic, delaying her maiden voyage by three weeks, from 20 March to 10 April 1912.

=== Titanic disaster ===
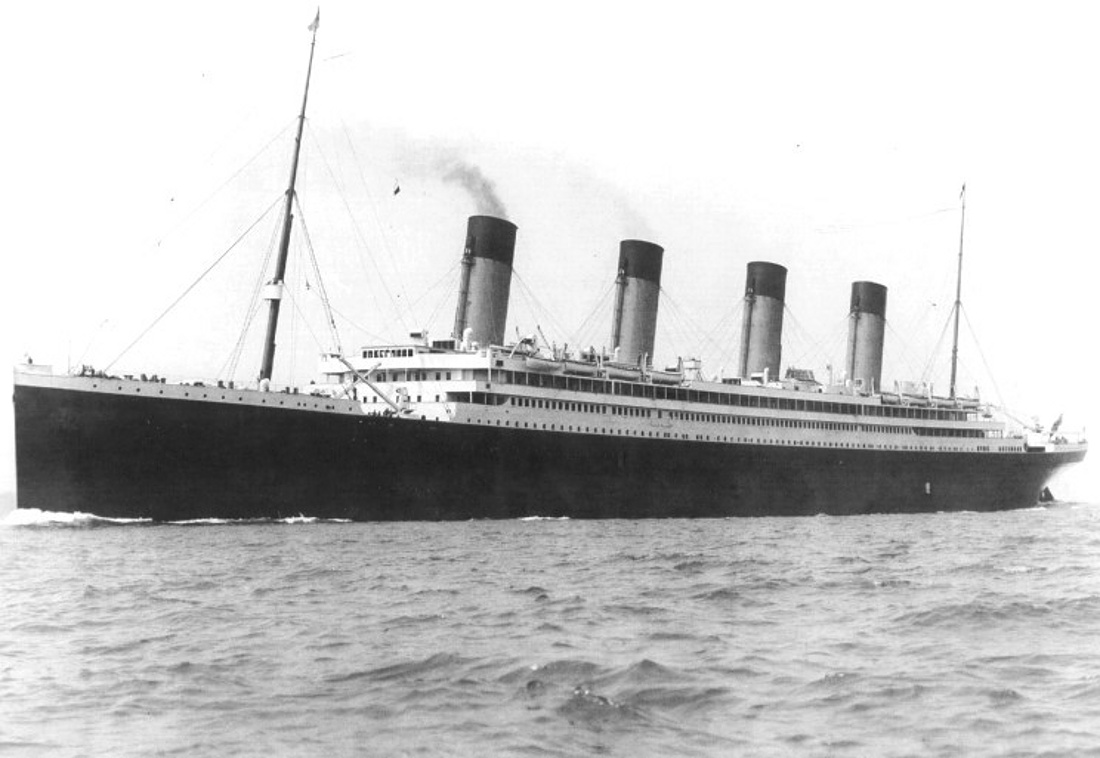
Olympic photographed near the Isle of Wight in October 1912 after the Titanic disaster

On 14 April 1912, Olympic, now under the command of Herbert James Haddock, was on a return trip from New York. Wireless operator Ernest James Moore received the distress call from Titanic, when she was approximately 505 miles west by south of Titanic's location. Haddock calculated a new course, ordered the ship's engines to be set to full power and headed to assist in the rescue.

When Olympic was about 100 nautical miles (190 km; 120 mi) away from Titanic's last known position, she received a message from Captain Rostron of Cunard's RMS Carpathia, which had arrived at the scene. Rostron explained that Olympic continuing on course to Titanic would gain nothing, as "All boats accounted for. About 675 souls saved [...] Titanic foundered about 2:20 am." Rostron requested that the message be forwarded to White Star and Cunard. He also reported that he was returning to harbour in New York. Subsequently, the wireless room aboard Olympic operated as a clearing room for radio messages.

When Olympic offered to take on the survivors, she was turned down by Rostron under orders from Ismay, who was concerned that asking the survivors to board a virtual mirror-image of Titanic would cause them distress. Olympic then resumed her voyage to Southampton, with all concerts cancelled as a mark of respect, arriving on 21 April with her flags at half-mast.

Over the next few months, Olympic assisted with both the American and British inquiries into the disaster. Deputations from both inquiries inspected Olympic's lifeboats, watertight doors and bulkheads and other equipment which were identical to those on Titanic. Sea tests were performed for the British inquiry in May, to establish how quickly the ship could turn two points at various speeds, to approximate how long it would have taken Titanic to turn after the iceberg was sighted.

=== 1912 strike ===
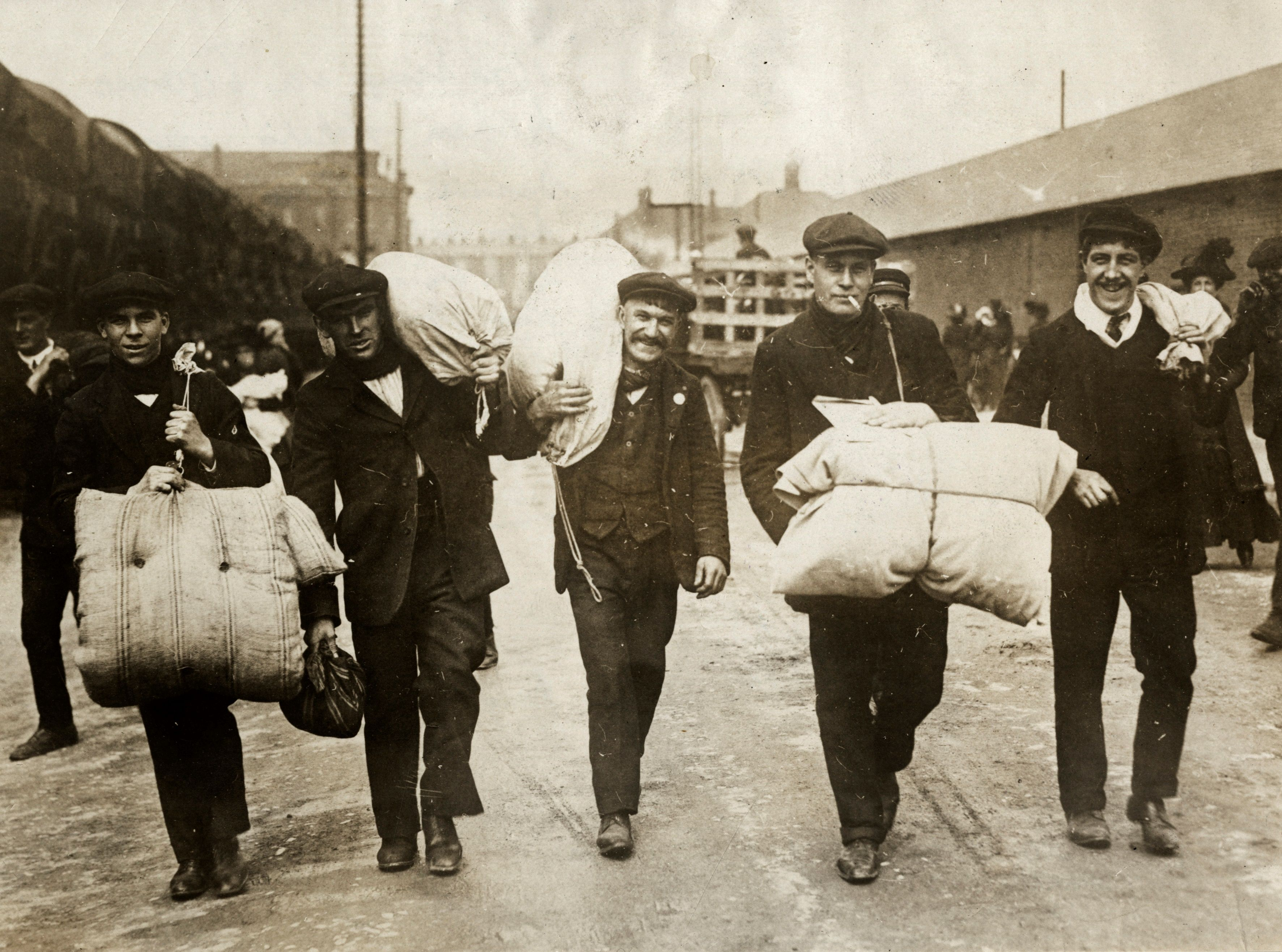
Stokers on strike

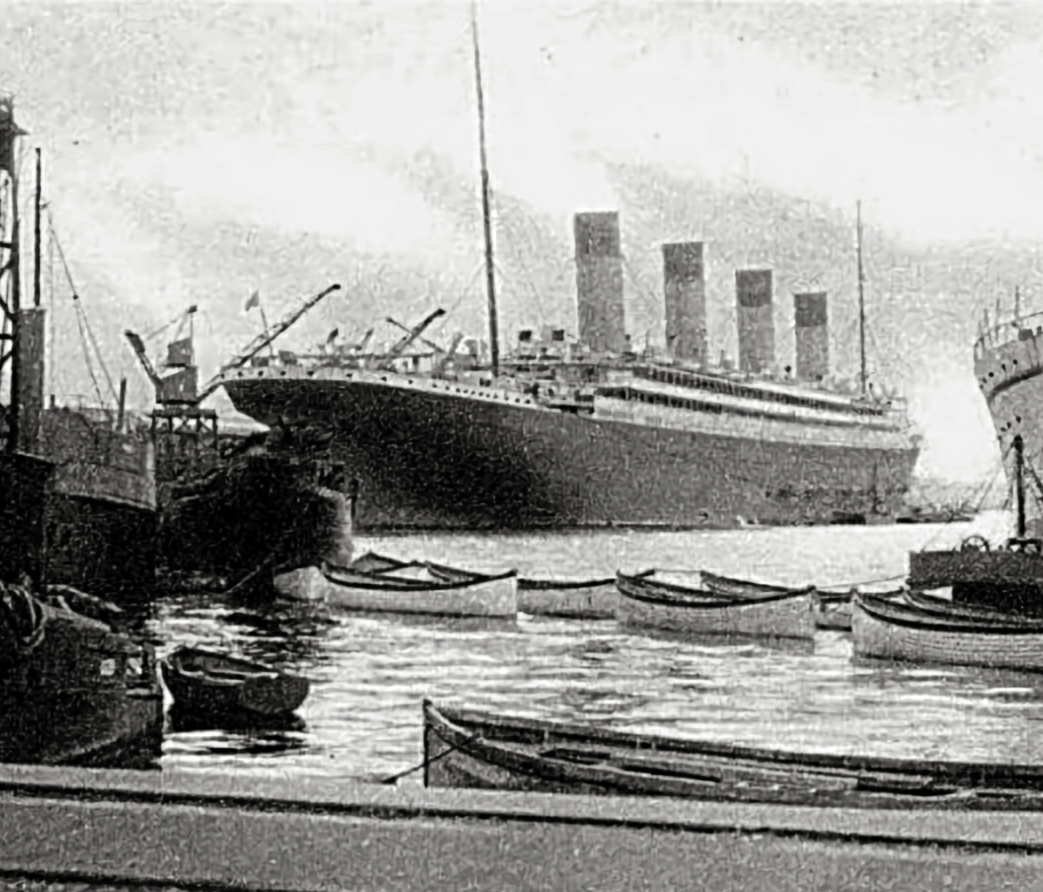
Olympic's new lifeboats, ready to be installed

Olympic, like Titanic and most liners of the time, did not carry lifeboats for everyone on board, and so was hurriedly equipped with additional, second-hand collapsible lifeboats following her return to Britain. Towards the end of April 1912, as she was about to sail from Southampton to New York, 284 of the ship's firemen went on strike, for fear that the ship's new collapsible lifeboats were not seaworthy. 100 non-union crew were hastily hired from Southampton as replacements, with more being hired from Liverpool.

The 40 collapsible lifeboats were transferred from troopships and put on Olympic, and many were rotten and would not open. The crewmen, instead, sent a request to the Southampton manager of the White Star Line that the collapsible boats be replaced by wooden lifeboats; the manager replied that this was impossible and that the collapsible boats had been passed as seaworthy by a Board of Trade inspector. The men were not satisfied and ceased work in protest.

On 25 April, a deputation of strikers witnessed a test of four of the collapsible boats. One was unseaworthy and the deputation said that it was prepared to recommend the men return to work if the boats were replaced. However, the strikers now objected to the non-union strikebreaker crew which had come on board, and demanded that they be dismissed, which the White Star Line refused. Fifty-four sailors then left the ship, objecting to the non-union crew who they claimed were unqualified and therefore dangerous, and refused to sail with them. This led to the scheduled sailing being cancelled.

All 54 sailors were arrested on a charge of mutiny when they went ashore. On 4 May 1912, Portsmouth magistrates found the charges against the mutineers were proven, but discharged them without imprisonment or fine, due to the special circumstances of the case. Fearing that public opinion would be on the side of the strikers, the White Star Line let them return to work and Olympic sailed on 15 May.

=== Post-Titanic refit ===
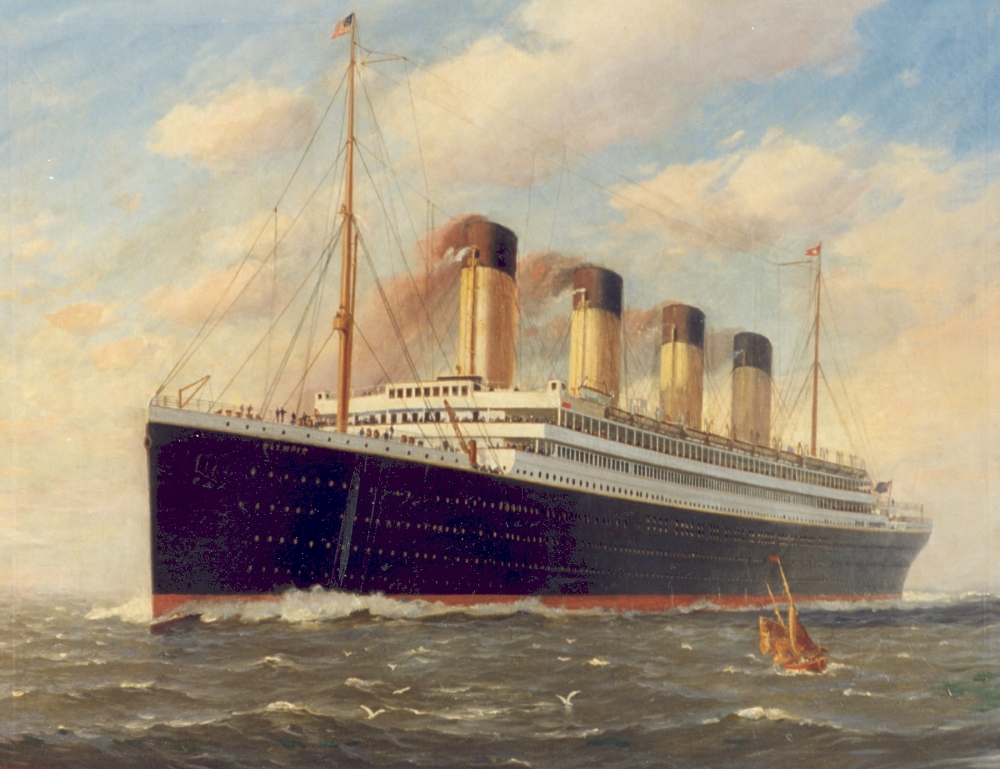
Olympic as she appeared after her refit following the Titanic disaster, with an increased complement of lifeboats, on a Fred Pansing painting, c. 1912

On 9 October 1912, White Star withdrew Olympic from service and returned her to her builders at Belfast to incorporate lessons learned from the Titanic disaster six months prior and improve safety. The number of lifeboats carried by Olympic was increased from twenty to sixty-eight, and extra davits were installed along the boat deck to accommodate them. An inner watertight skin was also constructed in the boiler and engine rooms, which created a double hull. Five of the watertight bulkheads were extended up to B-Deck, extending to the entire height of the hull. This corrected a flaw in the original design, in which the bulkheads only rose up as far as E or D-Deck, a short distance above the waterline. This flaw had been exposed during Titanic's sinking, where water spilled over the top of the bulkheads as the ship sank and flooded subsequent compartments. In addition, an extra bulkhead was added to subdivide the electrical dynamo room, bringing the total number of watertight compartments to seventeen. Improvements were also made to the ship's pumping apparatus. These modifications meant that Olympic could survive a collision similar to that of Titanic, in that her first six compartments could be breached and the ship could remain afloat.

At the same time, Olympic's B Deck underwent a refit, which included extra cabins in place of the covered promenade, more private bathing facilities, an enlarged Á La Carte restaurant, and a Café Parisien (another addition that had proved popular on Titanic) was added, offering another dining option to first class passengers. With these changes (and a second refit in 1919 after the war), Olympic's gross register tonnage rose to 46,439 tons, 111 tons more than Titanic's.

In March 1913, Olympic returned to service and briefly regained the title of largest ocean liner in the world, until the German liner SS Imperator entered passenger service in June. Following her refit, Olympic was marketed as the "new" Olympic and her improved safety features were featured prominently in advertisements. The ship experienced a short period of tranquility, although while she was in the mid-Atlantic during a storm on 7 February 1914 a rogue wave struck her which shattered eight first class portholes, swamped the dining saloon during lunch, and injured the ship's purser and several passengers.

=== First World War ===
On 4 August 1914, Britain entered the First World War. Olympic initially remained in commercial service under Captain Herbert James Haddock. As a wartime measure, Olympic was painted in a grey colour scheme, portholes were blocked, and lights on deck were turned off to make the ship less visible. The schedule was hastily altered to terminate at Liverpool rather than Southampton, and this was later altered again to Glasgow.

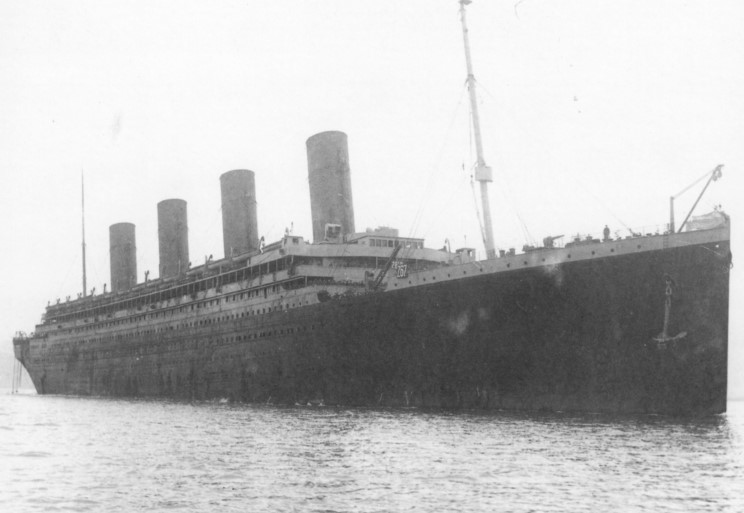
Olympic in grey colour scheme

The first few wartime voyages were packed with Americans trapped in Europe, eager to return home; the eastbound journeys carried few passengers. By mid-October, bookings had fallen sharply as the threat from German U-boats became increasingly serious, and White Star Line decided to withdraw Olympic from commercial service. On 21 October 1914, she left New York for Glasgow on her last commercial voyage of the war, though carrying only 153 passengers.

==== Audacious incident 1914 ====
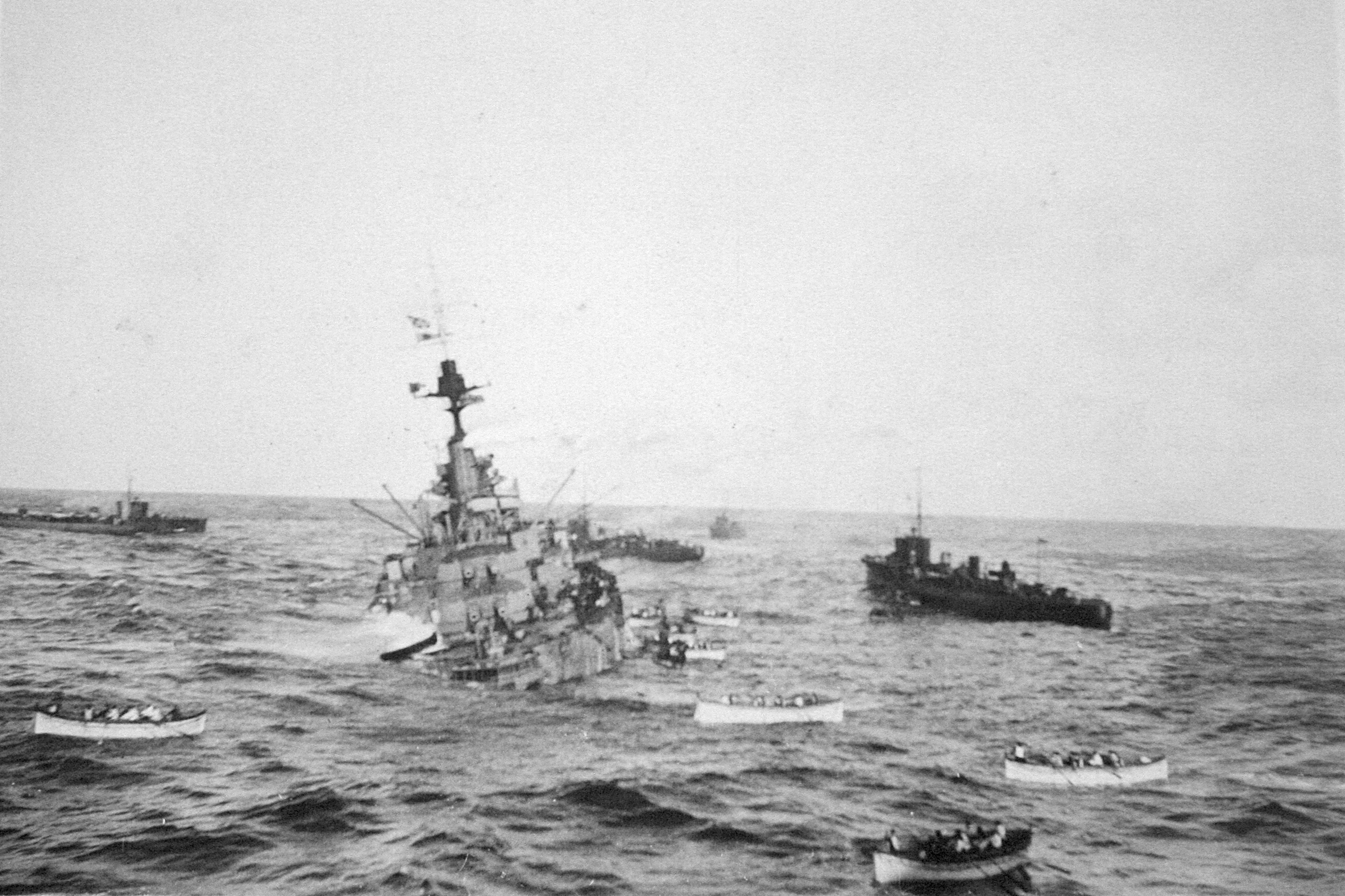
The crew of the battleship HMS Audacious take to lifeboats; amateur photograph taken by Mabel and Edith Smith, passengers on Olympic

On the sixth day of her voyage, 27 October, as Olympic passed near Lough Swilly off the north coast of Ireland, she received distress signals from the battleship HMS Audacious, which had struck a mine off Tory Island and was taking on water. HMS Liverpool was in the company of Audacious.

Olympic took off 250 of Audacious's crew, then the destroyer HMS Fury managed to attach a tow cable between Audacious and Olympic and they headed west for Lough Swilly. However, the cable parted after Audacious's steering gear failed. A second attempt was made to tow the warship, but the cable became tangled in HMS Liverpool's propellers and was severed. A third attempt was tried but also failed when the cable gave way. By 17:00 the Audacious's quarterdeck was awash and it was decided to evacuate the remaining crew members to Olympic and Liverpool. At 20:55 there was an explosion aboard Audacious and she sank.

Admiral Sir John Jellicoe, Commander of the Home Fleet, was anxious to suppress the news of the sinking of Audacious, for fear of the demoralising effect it could have on the British public, so he ordered Olympic to be held in custody at Lough Swilly. No communications were permitted and passengers were not allowed to leave the ship. The only people departing her were the crew of Audacious and Chief Surgeon John Beaumont, who was transferring to RMS Celtic. Steel tycoon Charles M. Schwab, who was travelling aboard the liner, sent word to Jellicoe that he had urgent business in London with the Admiralty, and Jellicoe agreed to release Schwab if he remained silent about the fate of Audacious. Finally, on 2 November, Olympic was allowed to go to Belfast where the passengers disembarked.

==== Naval service ====
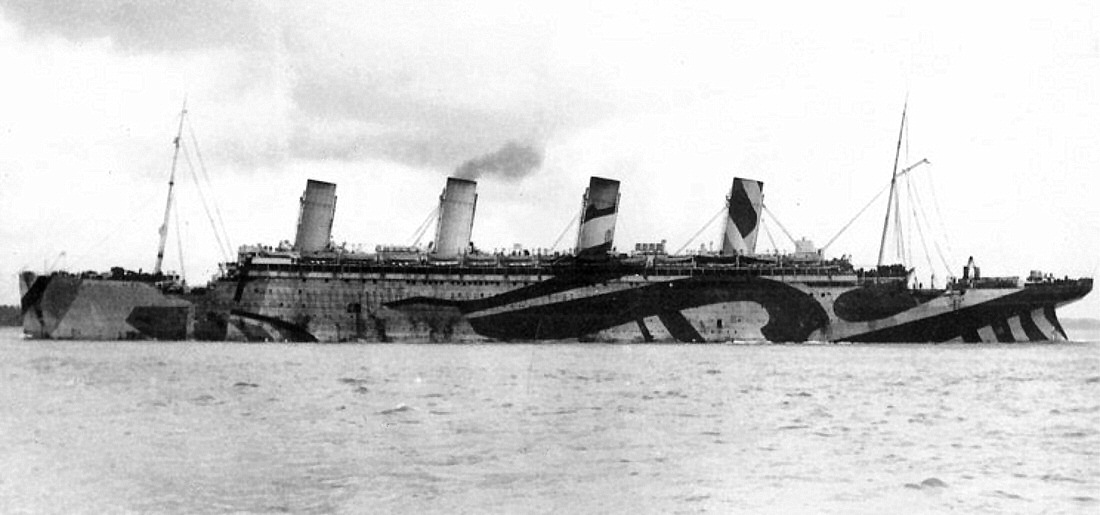
Olympic in dazzle camouflage while in service as a troopship during the First World War

Following Olympic's return to Britain, the White Star Line intended to lay her up in Belfast until the war was over, but in May 1915 she was requisitioned by the Admiralty, to be used as a troop transport, along with the Cunard liners Mauretania and Aquitania. The Admiralty had initially been reluctant to use large ocean liners as troop transports because of their vulnerability to enemy attack; however, a shortage of ships gave them little choice. At the same time, Olympic's other sister ship Britannic, which had not yet been completed, was requisitioned as a hospital ship. Operating in that role she would strike a German naval mine and sink in the Aegean Sea on 21 November 1916.

Stripped of her peacetime fittings and now armed with 12-pounders and 4.7-inch guns, Olympic was converted to a troopship, with the capacity to transport up to 6,000 troops. On 24 September 1915, the newly designated HMT (His Majesty's Transport) 2810, now under the command of Bertram Fox Hayes, left Liverpool carrying 6,000 soldiers to Moudros, Greece for the Gallipoli Campaign. On 1 October, lifeboats from the French ship Provincia which had been sunk by a U-boat that morning off Cape Matapan were sighted and 34 survivors rescued by Olympic. Hayes was criticised for this action by the British Admiralty, who accused him of putting the ship in danger by stopping her in waters where enemy U-boats were active. The ship's speed was considered to be her best defence against U-boat attack, and such a large ship stopped would have made an unmissable target. However, the French Vice-Admiral Louis Dartige du Fournet took a different view, and awarded Hayes with the Gold Medal of Honour. Olympic made several more trooping journeys to the Mediterranean until early 1916, when the Gallipoli Campaign was abandoned. (Note: For the subsequent voyage from Liverpool to Mudros, 14 November 1915 to 5 December 1915, a war diary was recorded.*Dempsey, James Arthur Dermot. "OC Troops RMS Olympic (1915 Nov – Dec)". War Diaries (Part III – Gallipoli and Dardanelles), 1915–1916. Subfolder within Lines of Communication Troops, archive reference WO 95/4359, compiled by Captain Dempsey as adjutant to Officer Commanding Troops, 14 November to 3 December 1915 – via The National Archives (United Kingdom).)

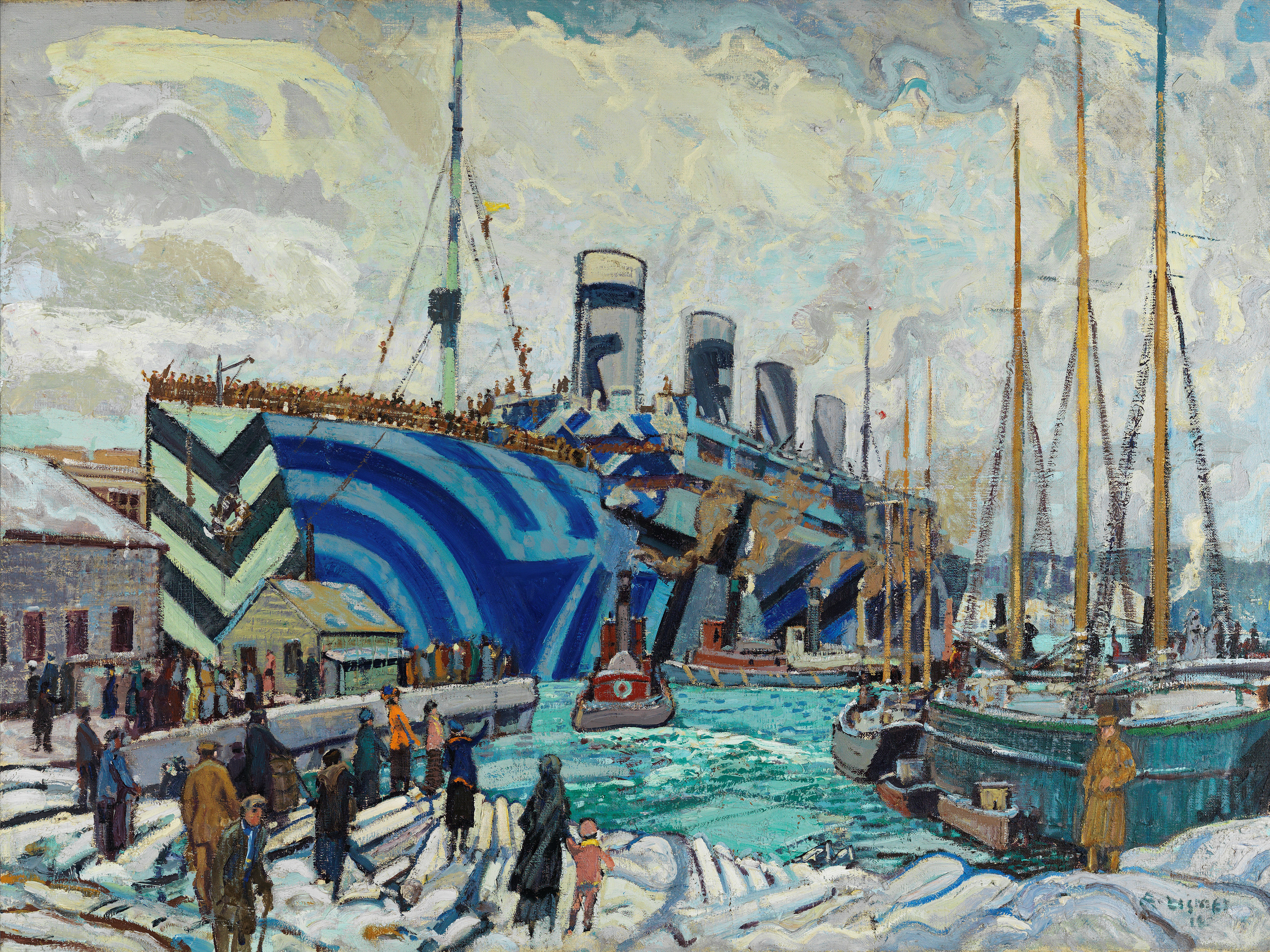
Olympic in dazzle at Pier 2 in Halifax, Nova Scotia, painted by Arthur Lismer

In 1916, considerations were made to use Olympic to transport troops to India via the Cape of Good Hope. However, on investigation it was decided that the ship was unsuitable for this role, because the coal bunkers, which had been designed for transatlantic runs, lacked the capacity for such a long journey at a reasonable speed. Instead, from 1916 to 1917, Olympic was chartered by the Canadian government to transport troops from Halifax, Nova Scotia, to Britain. In 1917, she gained 6-inch guns and was painted with a dazzle camouflage scheme to make it more difficult for observers to estimate her speed and heading. Her dazzle colours were brown, dark blue, light blue, and white. Her many visits to Halifax Harbour carrying Canadian troops safely overseas, and back home after the war at Pier 2, made her a favourite symbol in the city of Halifax. Noted Group of Seven artist Arthur Lismer made several paintings of Olympic in Halifax. A large dance hall, the "Olympic Gardens", was also named in her honour.

After the United States declared war on Germany, Olympic transported thousands of American troops to Britain.

==== Sinking of U-103 ====
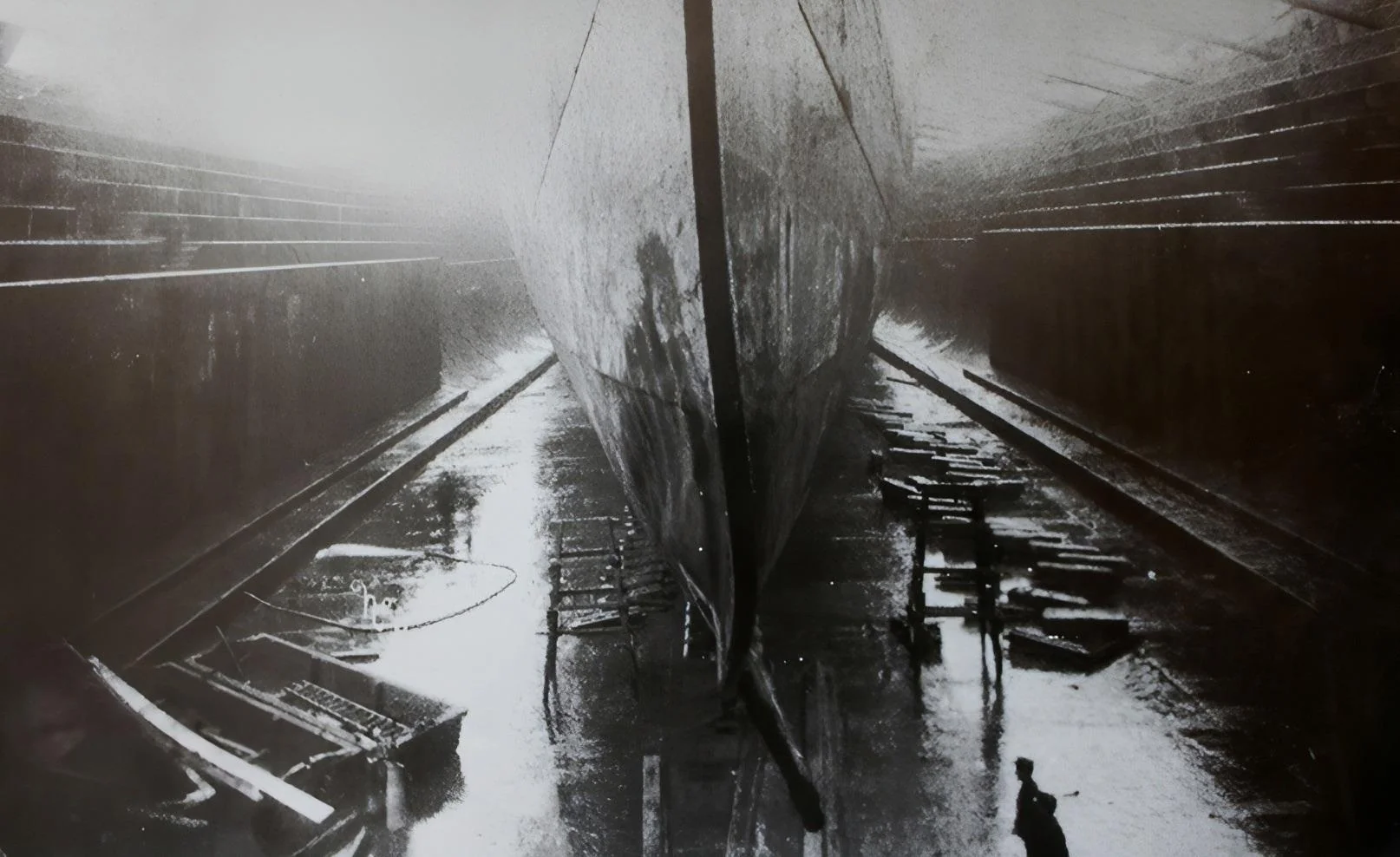
Olympic after colliding with U-103

In the early hours of 12 May 1918, while en route for France in the English Channel with US troops under the command of Captain Hayes, Olympic sighted a surfaced U-boat 550 yards (1,650 ft; 500 m) ahead. Olympic's gunners opened fire at once, and the ship turned to ram the submarine, which immediately crash dived to 16 fathoms (96 ft; 29 m) and turned to a parallel course. Almost immediately afterwards, Olympic struck the submarine just aft of her conning tower with her bow slicing through U-103's pressure hull. The crew of U-103 blew her ballast tanks, scuttled and abandoned the submarine. Olympic did not stop to pick up survivors, but continued on to Cherbourg. Meanwhile, USS Davis had sighted a distress flare and picked up 31 survivors from U-103. Olympic returned to Southampton with at least two hull plates dented and her prow twisted to one side, but not breached.

It was subsequently discovered that U-103 had been preparing to torpedo Olympic when she was sighted, but the crew were not able to flood the two stern torpedo tubes. For his service, Captain Hayes was awarded the DSO. Some American soldiers on board paid for a plaque to be placed in one of Olympic's lounges to commemorate the event, it read:

This tablet presented by the 59th Regiment United States Infantry commemorates the sinking of the German submarine U103 by Olympic on May 12th 1918 in latitude 49 degrees 16 minutes north longitude 4 degrees 51 minutes west on the voyage from New York to Southampton with American troops...

During the war, Olympic is reported to have carried up to 201,000 troops and other personnel, burning 347,000 tons of coal and travelling about 160,000 nautical miles (180,000 mi; 300,000 km). Olympic's war service earned her the nickname Old Reliable. Her captain was knighted in 1919 for "valuable services in connection with the transport of troops".

Olympic holds the distinction of being the only passenger liner to ram – and sink – a German U-Boat during the First World War.

=== Post-war ===
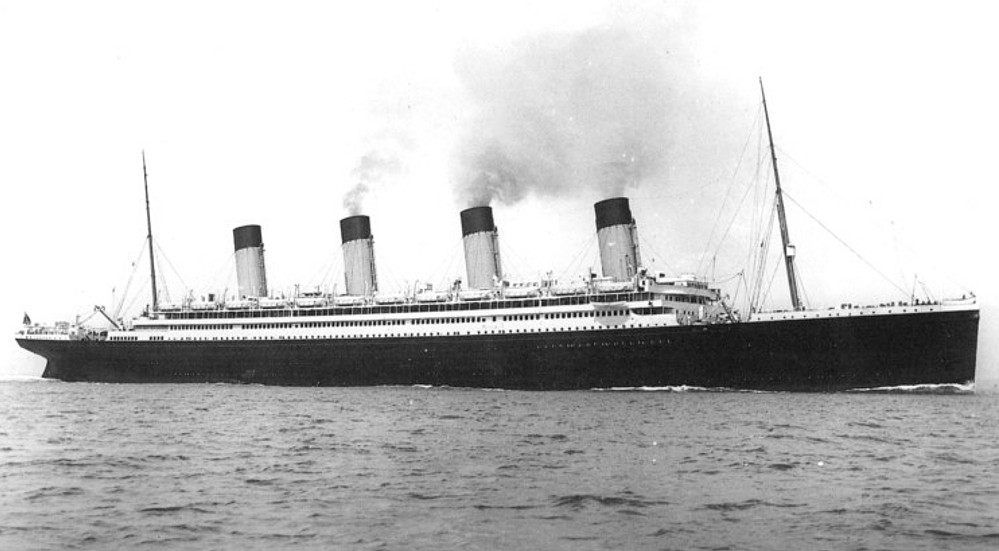
Olympic, photographed in 1922

In August 1919, Olympic returned to Belfast for restoration to civilian service. The interiors were modernised and the boilers were converted to oil firing rather than coal burning. This modification would reduce the refuelling time from days to 5 or 6 hours; it also gave a steadier engine R.P.M. and allowed the engine room personnel to be reduced from 350 to 60 people. During the conversion work and drydocking, a dent with a crack at the centre was discovered below her waterline which was later concluded to have been caused by a torpedo that had failed to detonate. The historian Mark Chirnside concluded that the faulty torpedo had been fired by the U-boat SM U-53 on 4 September 1918, while Olympic was in the English Channel.

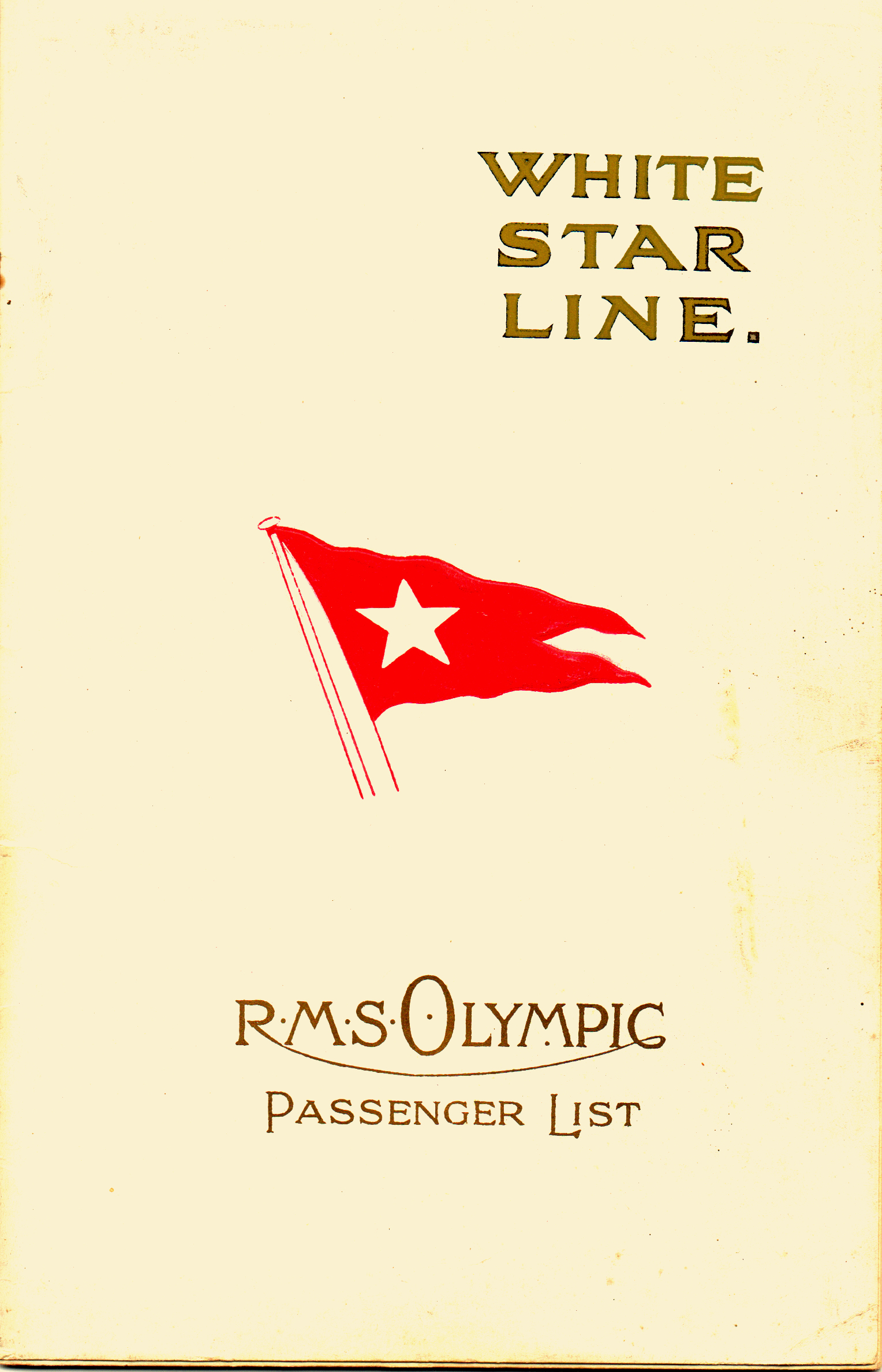
Olympic's list of first-class passengers, 1923

Olympic emerged from refit with an increased tonnage of 46,439, allowing her to retain her claim to the title of largest British-built liner afloat, although the Cunard Line's Aquitania was slightly longer. On 25 June 1920 she returned to passenger service, on one voyage that year carrying 2,249 passengers, and carried more than 28,000 passengers throughout the second half of 1920. Olympic transported a record 38,000 passengers during 1921, which proved to be the peak year of her career. With the loss of the Titanic and Britannic, Olympic initially lacked any suitable running mates for the express service; however, in 1922, White Star obtained two former German liners, Majestic and Homeric (formerly Bismarck and Columbus), which had been given to Britain as war reparations. These joined Olympic as running mates, operating successfully until the Great Depression reduced demand after 1930.

During the 1920s, Olympic remained a popular and fashionable liner, and often attracted the rich and famous of the day; Marie Curie, Sir Arthur Conan Doyle, Charlie Chaplin, Mary Pickford and Douglas Fairbanks, and Prince Edward, then Prince of Wales, were among the celebrities that she carried. Prince Edward and Captain Howarth were filmed on the bridge of Olympic for Pathé News. According to his autobiography, and confirmed by US Immigration records, Cary Grant, then 16-year-old Archibald Leach, first set sail to New York on Olympic on 21 July 1920 on the same voyage on which Douglas Fairbanks and Mary Pickford were celebrating their honeymoon. One of the attractions of Olympic was that she was nearly identical to Titanic, and many passengers sailed on Olympic as a way of vicariously experiencing the voyage of her sister ship. On 22 March 1924, Olympic was involved in another collision with a ship, this time in New York. As Olympic was reversing from her berth in New York harbour, her stern collided with the smaller liner Fort St George, which had crossed into her path. The collision caused extensive damage to the smaller ship. At first it appeared that Olympic had sustained only minor damage, but it was later revealed that her sternpost had been fractured, necessitating the replacement of her entire stern frame.

On 7 June 1924, Lord Pirrie died on a business trip aboard RMS Ebro in the Caribbean off Cuba. On 13 June Ebro reached New York; UK ships in the port of New York lowered their flags to half-mast; and Pirrie's body was transferred to Olympic to be repatriated to the UK.

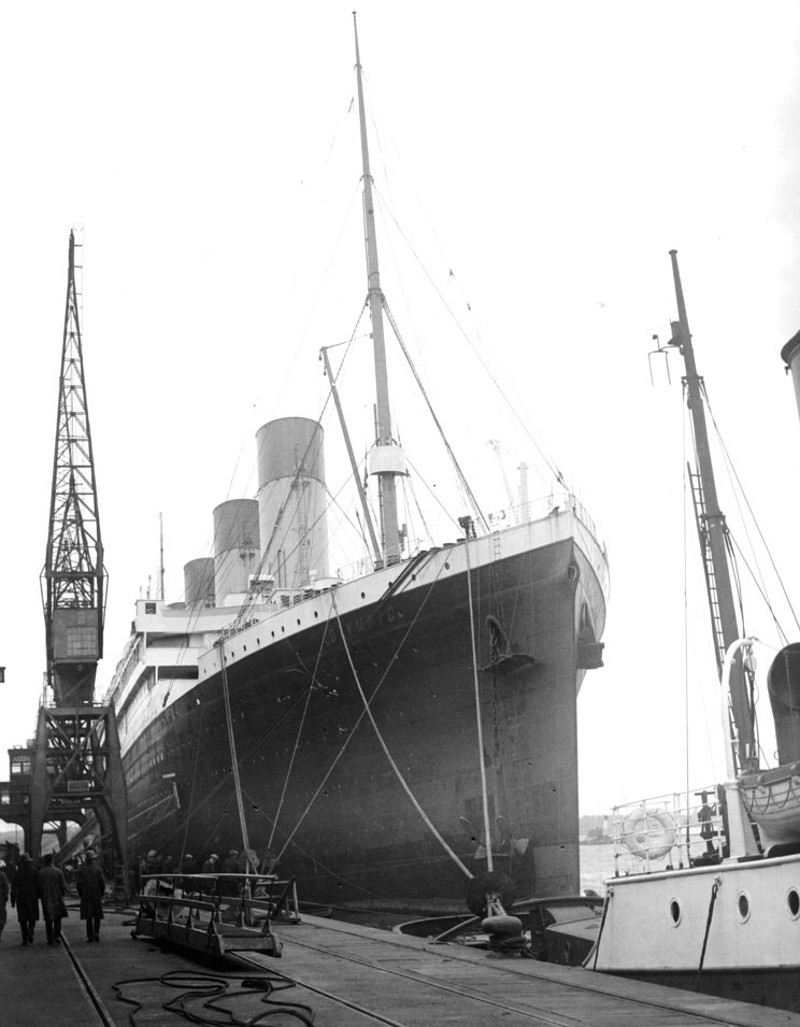
Olympic at Southampton in 1929

Changes in immigration laws in the United States in the 1920s greatly restricted the number of immigrants allowed to enter. The law limited the number of immigrants to about 160,000 per year in 1924. This led to a major reduction in the immigrant trade for the shipping lines, forcing them to cater to the tourist trade to survive. At the turn of 1927–28, Olympic was converted to carry tourist third cabin passengers as well as first, second and third class. Tourist third cabin was an attempt to attract travellers who desired comfort without the accompanying high ticket price. New public rooms were constructed for this class, although tourist third cabin and second class would merge to become 'tourist' by late 1931.

A year later, Olympic's first-class cabins were again improved by adding more bathrooms, a dance floor was fitted in the enlarged first-class dining saloon, and a number of new suites with private facilities were installed forward on B deck. More improvements would follow in a later refit, but 1929 saw Olympic's best average passenger lists since 1925.

On 18 November 1929, as Olympic was travelling westbound near to Titanic's last known position, the ship suddenly started to vibrate violently, and the vibrations continued for two minutes. It was later determined that this had been caused by the 1929 Grand Banks earthquake.

==== Last years ====
The shipping trade was badly affected by the Great Depression. Until 1930 there had generally been around one million passengers a year on the transatlantic route, but by 1934 this had dropped by more than half. Furthermore, by the early 1930s, increased competition emerged, in the form of a new generation of larger and faster liners such as Germany's SS Bremen and SS Europa, Italy's SS Rex and France's SS Île de France, and the remaining passengers tended to prefer the more up-to-date ships. Olympic had averaged around 1,000 passengers per journey until 1930, but this declined by more than half by 1932.

Olympic's running mate Homeric was withdrawn from the transatlantic route as early as 1932, leaving only Olympic and Majestic maintaining White Star Line's Southampton-New York service, although this was occasionally augmented during the summer months by either MV Britannic or MV Georgic. During slack periods in the summer, Olympic and fleet mate Majestic were employed in summer recreational cruises from New York to Pier 21 in Halifax, Nova Scotia.

At the end of 1932, with passenger traffic in decline, Olympic went for an overhaul and refit that took four months. She returned to service on 5 March 1933 described by her owners as "looking like new." Her engines were performing at their best and she repeatedly recorded speeds in excess of 23 kn (43 km/h; 26 mph), despite averaging less than that in regular transatlantic service. Passenger capacities were given as 618 first class, 447 tourist class and only 382 third class after the decline of the immigrant trade.

Despite this, during 1933 and 1934, Olympic ran at a net operating loss for the first time. Olympic's Grand Staircase was painted avocado green along with pathways and pillars and the yellow line at the hull was lowered to look more similar to Majestic and Homeric during a 1933 refit. 1933 was Olympic's worst year of business – carrying just over 9,000 passengers in total. Passenger numbers rose slightly in 1934, but many crossings still lost money.

=== Nantucket lightship collision ===
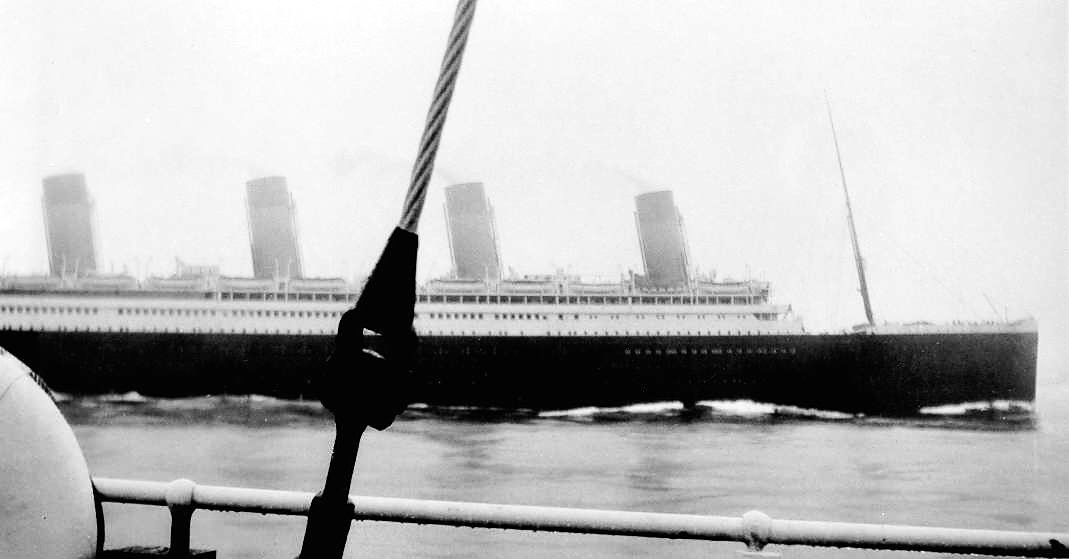
Olympic in 1934, passing the Nantucket Lightship, the same ship she would strike and sink a few months later

In 1934, Olympic again struck another ship. The approaches to New York were marked by lightships and Olympic, like other liners, had been known to pass close by these vessels. On 15 May 1934 (11:06 am), Olympic, inbound in heavy fog, was homing in on the radio beacon of Nantucket Lightship LV-117. Now under the command of Captain John W. Binks, the ship failed to turn in time and sliced through the smaller vessel, which quickly sank. Four of the lightship's crew went down with the vessel and seven were rescued, of whom three died of their injuries, seven fatalities out of a crew of 11. The lightship's surviving crew and Olympic's captain were interviewed soon after reaching shore. One crewman said it all happened so quickly that they did not know how it happened. Olympic reacted quickly lowering boats to rescue the crew, which was confirmed by an injured crewman.

=== Retirement ===
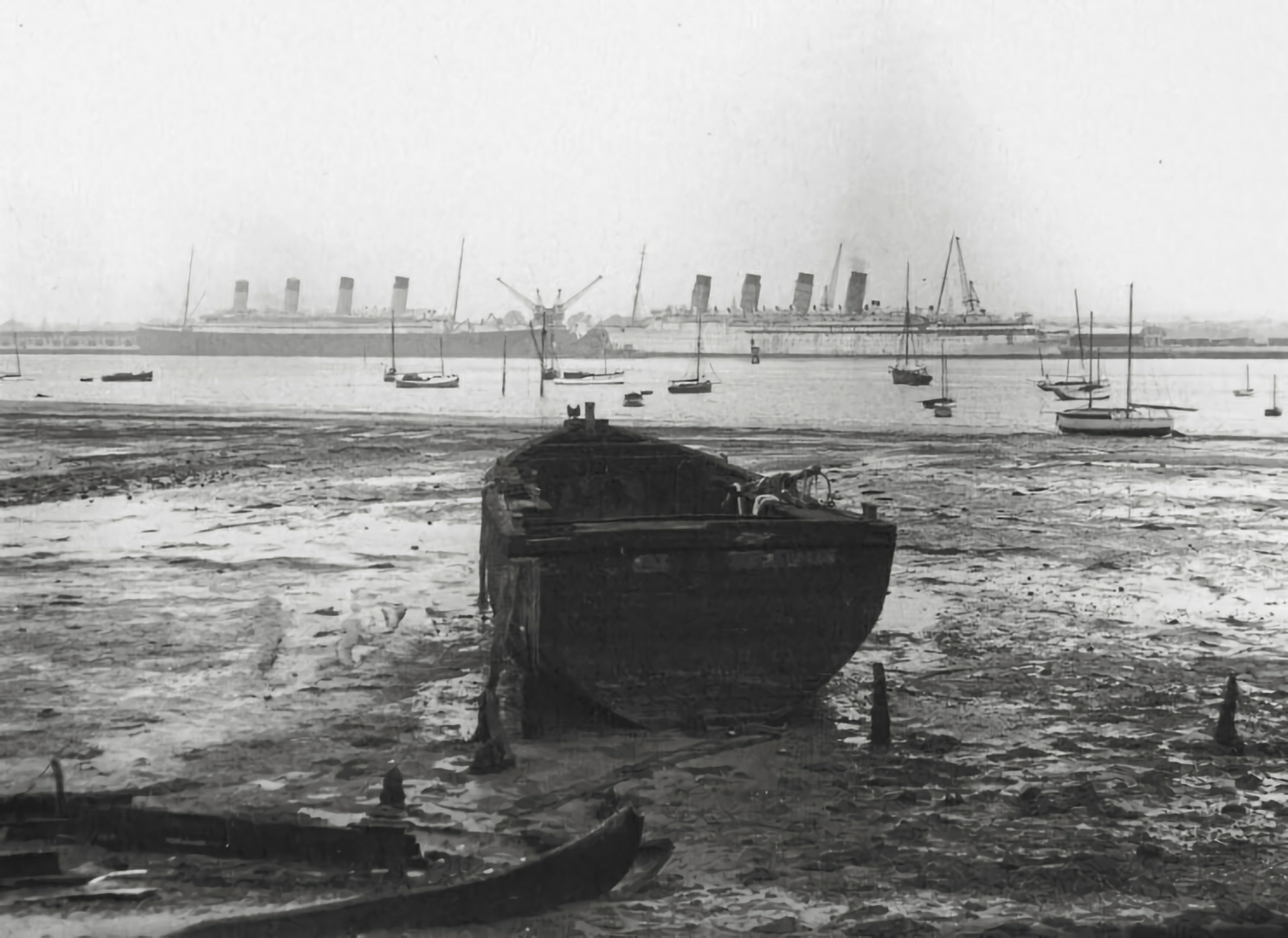
Olympic (left) and Mauretania (right) laid up in Southampton prior to their scrapping

In 1934, the White Star Line merged with the Cunard Line at the instigation of the British government, to form Cunard White Star. This merger allowed funds to be granted for the completion of the future Queen Mary and Queen Elizabeth. When completed, these two new ships would handle Cunard White Star's express service; so their fleet of older liners became redundant and were gradually retired.

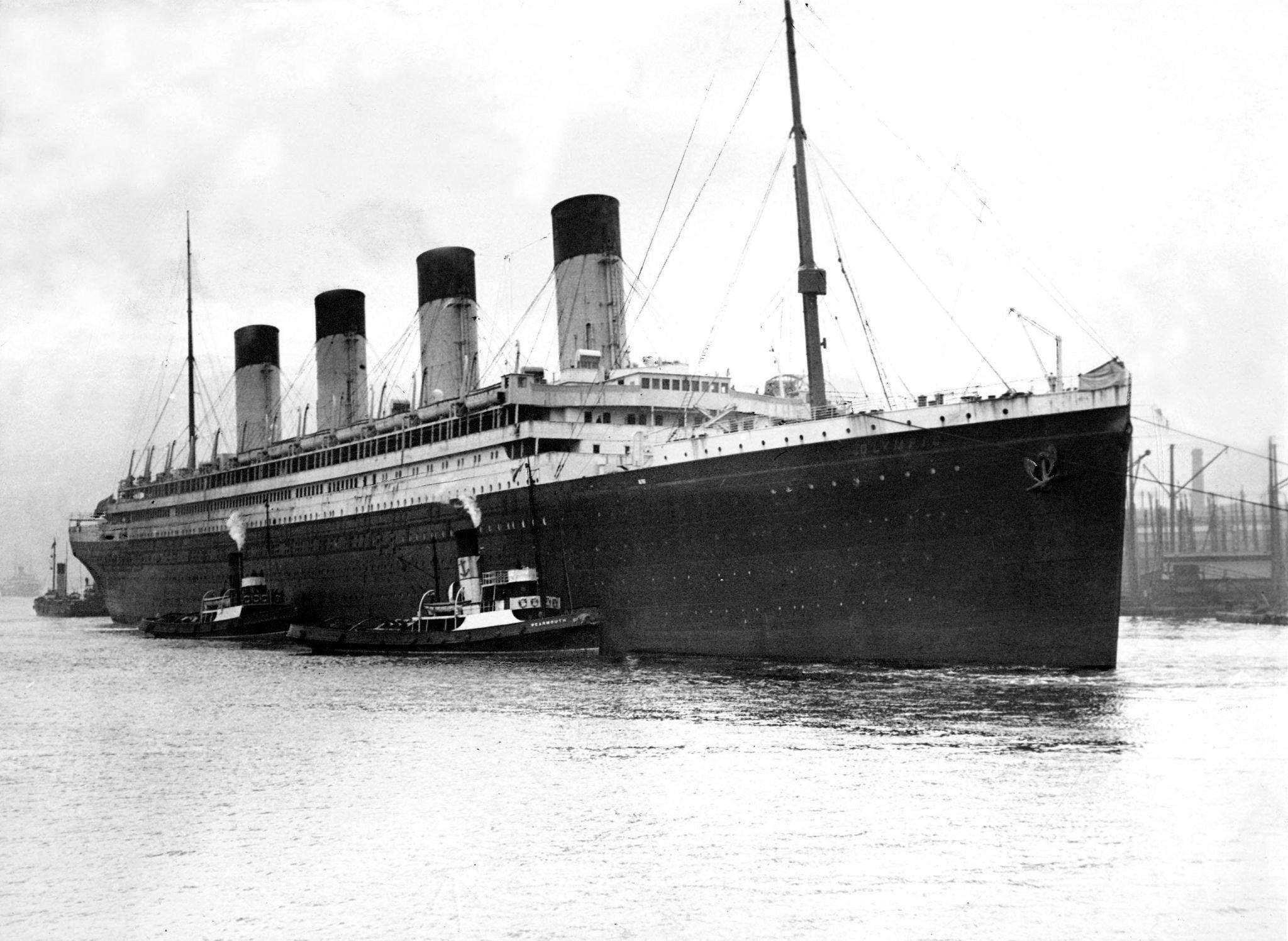
Olympic arriving at Jarrow for scrapping on 13 October 1935

Olympic was withdrawn from the transatlantic service, and left New York for the last time on 5 April 1935, returning to Britain to be laid up in Southampton. The new company considered using her for summer cruises for a short while, but this idea was abandoned and she was put up for sale. Among the potential buyers was a syndicate who proposed to turn her into a floating hotel off the south coast of France, but this came to nothing.

After being laid up for five months alongside her former rival Mauretania, she was sold to Sir John Jarvis – Member of Parliament – for £97,500, to be partially demolished at Jarrow to provide work for the depressed region. On 11 October 1935, Olympic left Southampton for the last time and arrived in Jarrow two days later. The scrapping began after the ship's fittings were auctioned off. Between 1935 and 1937, Olympic's superstructure and upper hull were demolished, and then on 19 September 1937, the remaining hulk was towed to Thos. W. Ward's yard at Inverkeithing for final demolition, which was most likely finished by late 1938 or early 1939. The Olympic was removed from the Shipping Registry on 4 February 1939. At that time, the ship's chief engineer commented, "I could understand the necessity if the 'Old Lady' had lost her efficiency, but the engines are as sound as they ever were".

By the time of her retirement, Olympic had completed 257 round trips across the Atlantic, transporting 430,000 passengers on her commercial voyages, travelling 1,600,000 nautical miles (1,800,000 mi; 3,000,000 km).

== Artefacts ==
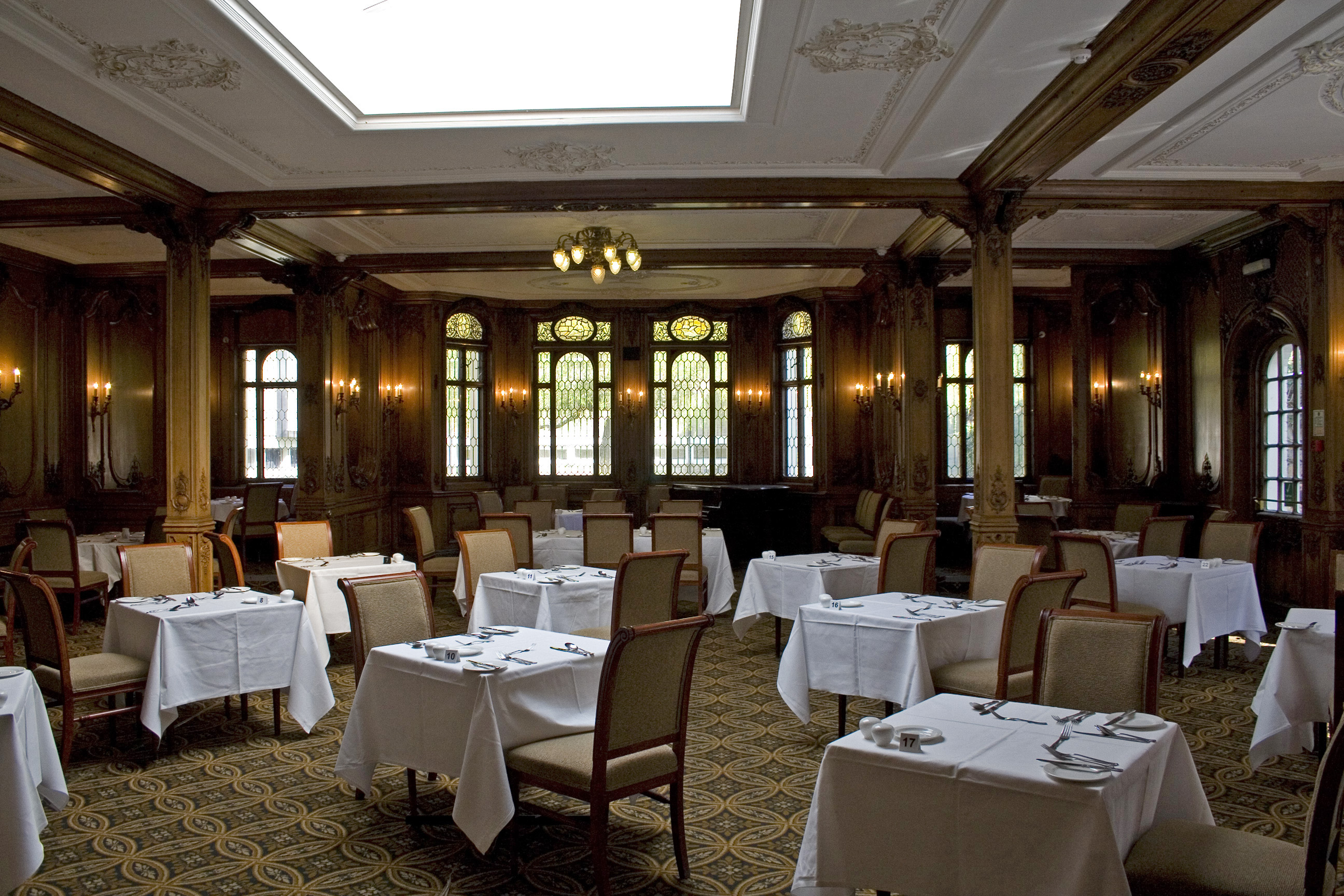
Fittings from the ship installed in the Olympic Suite at the White Swan Hotel, Alnwick

Olympic's fittings were auctioned off before the scrapping commenced.

The fittings of the first-class lounge and part of the aft grand staircase can be found in the White Swan Hotel, in Alnwick, Northumberland, England. A variety of panelling, light fixtures, flooring, doors, and windows from Olympic were installed in a paint factory in Haltwhistle, Northumberland, until they were auctioned in 2004. One suite at Sparth House Hotel, Clayton-le-Moors, Lancashire has the furniture from one of the staterooms, including light fitting, sink, wardrobes and fireplace. The crystal and ormolu electrolier from the lounge is installed in the Cutlers' Hall in Sheffield together with wood panelling from the Library and a set of wooden doors. Some of the timber panelling was used in the extension (completed in 1937) of St John the Baptist's Catholic Church in Padiham, Lancashire.

In 2000, Celebrity Cruises purchased some of Olympic's original wooden panels to create the "RMS Olympic Restaurant" on board their new cruise ship, Celebrity Millennium. According to the cruise line, this panelling had lined Olympic's À la Carte restaurant.

Olympic's bridge bell is on display at the Titanic Historical Society in Indian Orchard, Springfield, Massachusetts.

The clock depicting "Honour and Glory Crowning Time" from Olympic's grand staircase is on display at Southampton's SeaCity Museum.

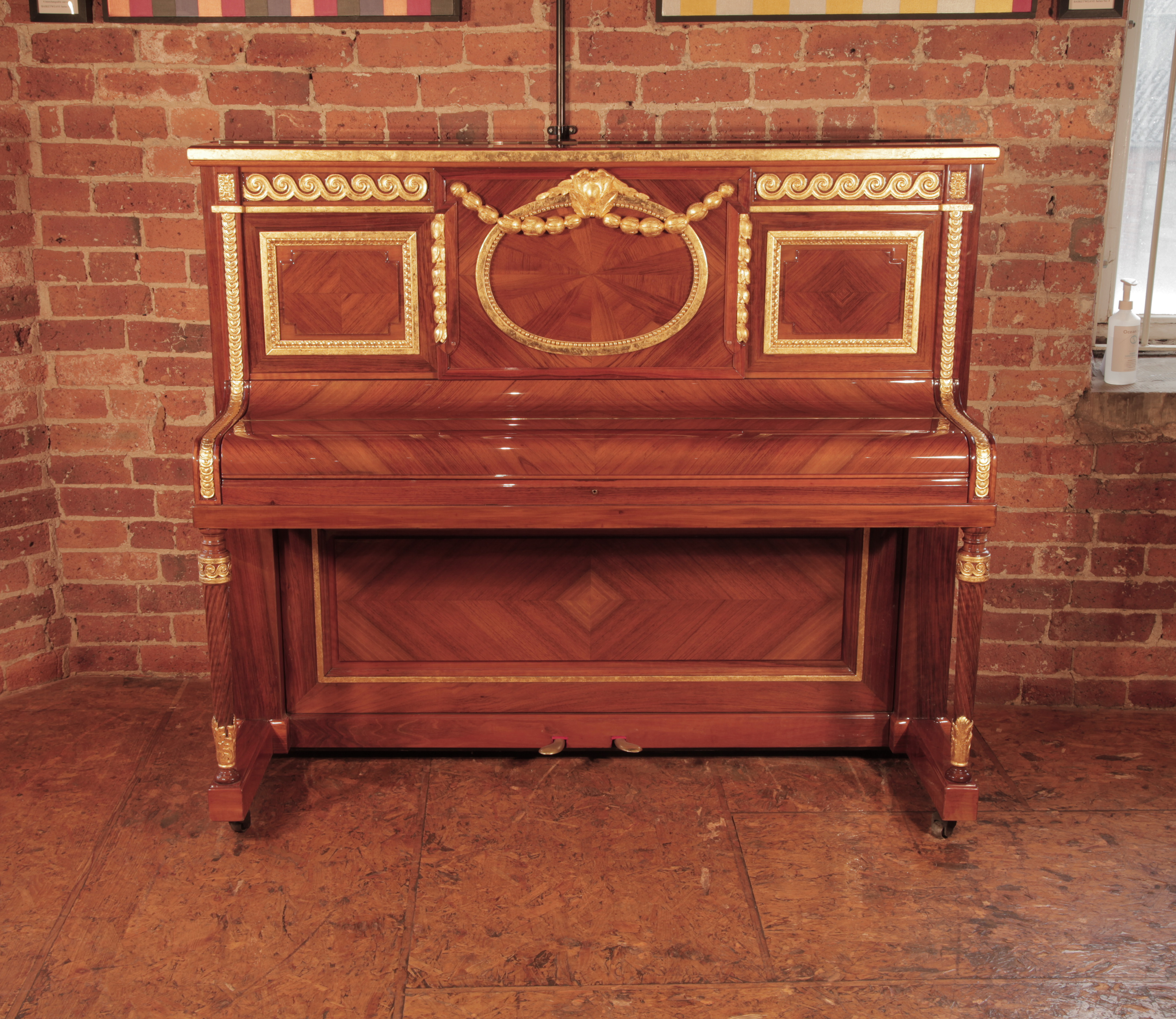
Olympic Steinway Vertegrand upright piano No.157550

In 1912, a Steinway Vertegrand upright piano No. 157550 with a quartered walnut case left the Steinway Hamburg factory unfinished and was sent to its London branch. In 1913, it was decorated by Harland & Wolff's interior decoration company Aldam Heaton & Co with carvings and gold accents. The piano was first placed in the aft starboard corner in the first-class reception room.

In 2017, the old billiard hall at 44 Priestpopple, Hexham, Northumberland, was demolished. It had opened in 1936. During an archaeological excavation on the demolition site by AAG Archaeology, one of the Olympic's chairs was recovered. The fittings from Olympic were auctioned off over ten days in November 1935 at the Palmers Works in Jarrow.

== Identification ==
Olympic's UK official number was 131346. Official numbers were issued by individual flag states; they should not be confused with IMO numbers.

Until 1933 Olympic's code letters were HSRP and her wireless telegraphy call sign was MKC. In 1930 new four-letter call signs superseded three-letter ones, and in 1934 they also superseded code letters. Olympic's new call sign was GLSQ.

== In popular culture ==
- Olympic is the subject of the 2022 song "Pride of the White Star Line" by Bristol band, The Longest Johns.
- In the 2022 film Operation Seawolf, the opening depicts Olympic ramming U-103.

== See also ==
- SS Nomadic, surviving tender to Olympic
- Timeline of largest passenger ships
- List of White Star Line ships
