= Thompson Graving Dock =

Old graving dock in Belfast, United Kingdom

Coordinates: 54.61434983°N 5.90170875°W

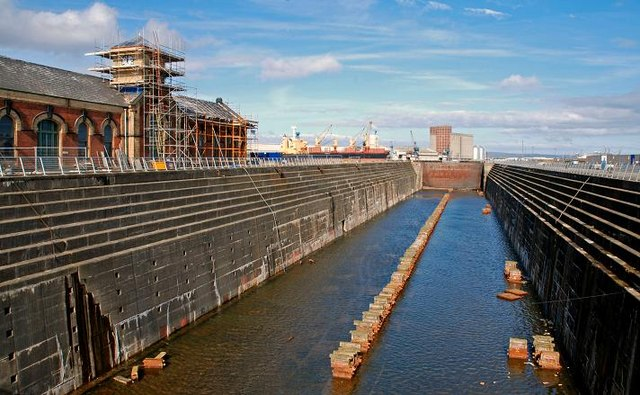
- The drydock and pumphouse

History

United Kingdom
- Name: Thompson Graving Dock
- Namesake: Robert Thompson, Belfast alderman
- Cost: 350,000 GBP
- Completed: 1 April 1911
- Home port: Belfast

General characteristics (as completed)
- Length: 886 ft 6 in (270.2 m) (maximum); 850 ft (259.1 m) (standard); 900 ft (274.3 m) (coping)
- Beam: 96 ft (29.3 m) (entrance); 100 ft (30.5 m) (floor); 128 ft (39.0 m) (top)
- Draft: 33 ft 9 in (10.3 m) (flood); 42 ft 6 in (13.0 m) (coping)

Thompson Graving Dock is a large graving dock and tourist attraction in Belfast, Northern Ireland. It is primarily known as the dry dock where Titanic was finished before she left Belfast for her maiden voyage. It is also known as Thompson Dry Dock, or simply Thompson Dock.

Thompson Graving Dock was built to enable the Belfast shipbuilding industry to conveniently finish the construction of larger ocean liners than those that had been in use up till then.

== Context ==
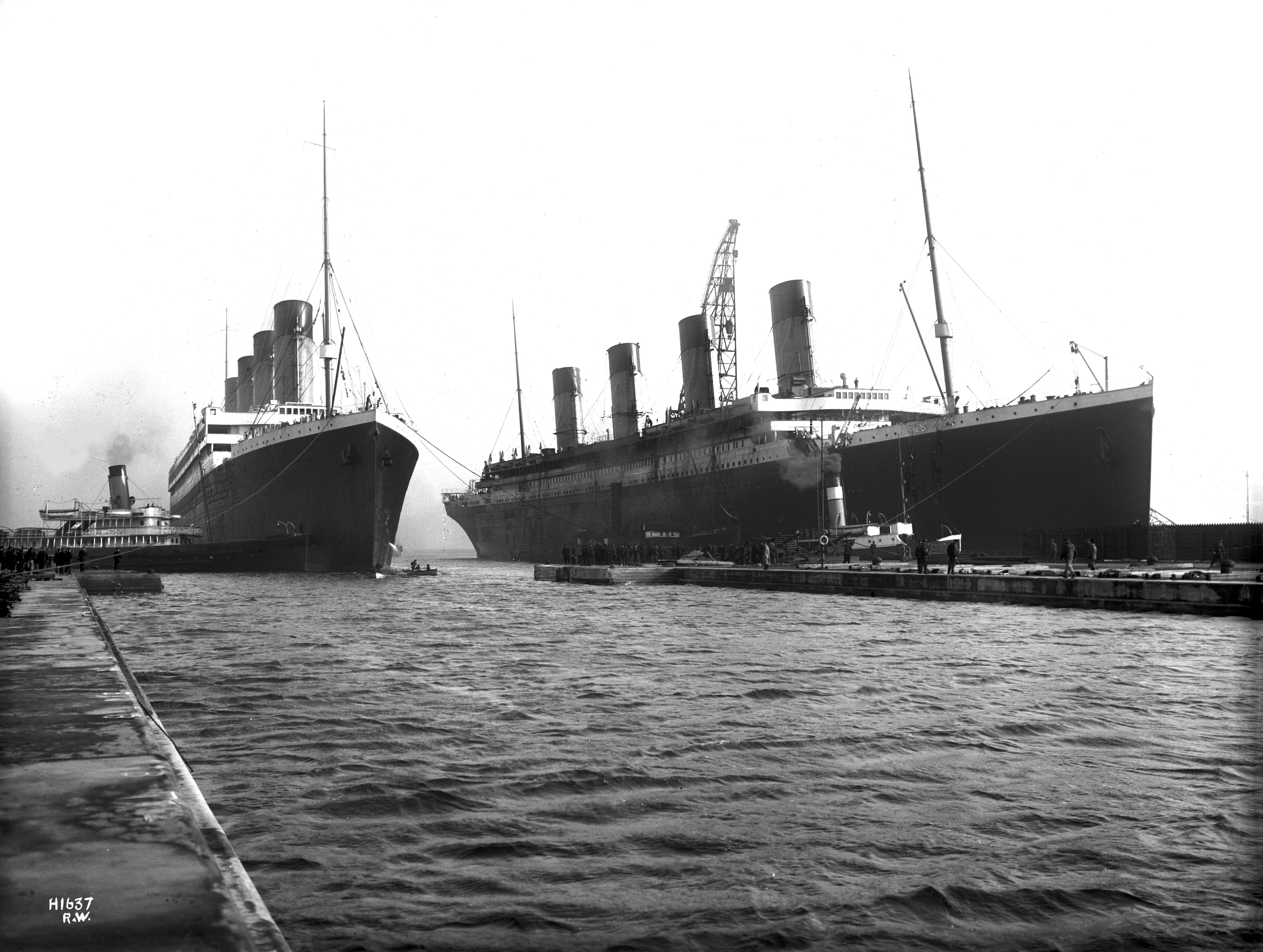
6 March 1912 Olympic (left) and Titanic, the latter during fitting out and having been moved out of the graving dock so a propeller on Olympic could be repaired.

Shipbuilding and ship repair were quite distinct activities up to the early 1800s. At about that time, developments like coppering and paddle steamers, and somewhat later, screw propulsion, made that ship repair had to switch from careening to using dry docks. Many port cities therefore wanted to have a dry dock. Without it, a port was less attractive to a shipping line because its vessels would have to make expensive trips to other ports for maintenance and repairs.

By the late 19th century, shipbuilding was the second industry of Belfast. This shipbuilding industry built many of the world's most prestigious ocean liners, including Titanic. For these heavy ships, finishing them in a dry dock was very convenient. By operating steam cranes that were mounted on a railway that ran along the dry dock's sides, parts could easily be lowered into the vessel. This was a big advantage over raising items over the side of a ship that was on a slipway.

The Belfast Board of Harbor Commissioners recognized the interests of commerce and shipbuilding and was able to execute a systematic scheme of harbor improvements. This included the construction of Alexandra Graving Dock, which was for some time the largest in the world. It also made the board start the construction of Thompson Graving Dock. Another version of why the new dock was built has that Harland & Wolff said that it would leave Belfast if the harbour commission did not built a suitable new dry dock.

== Construction ==
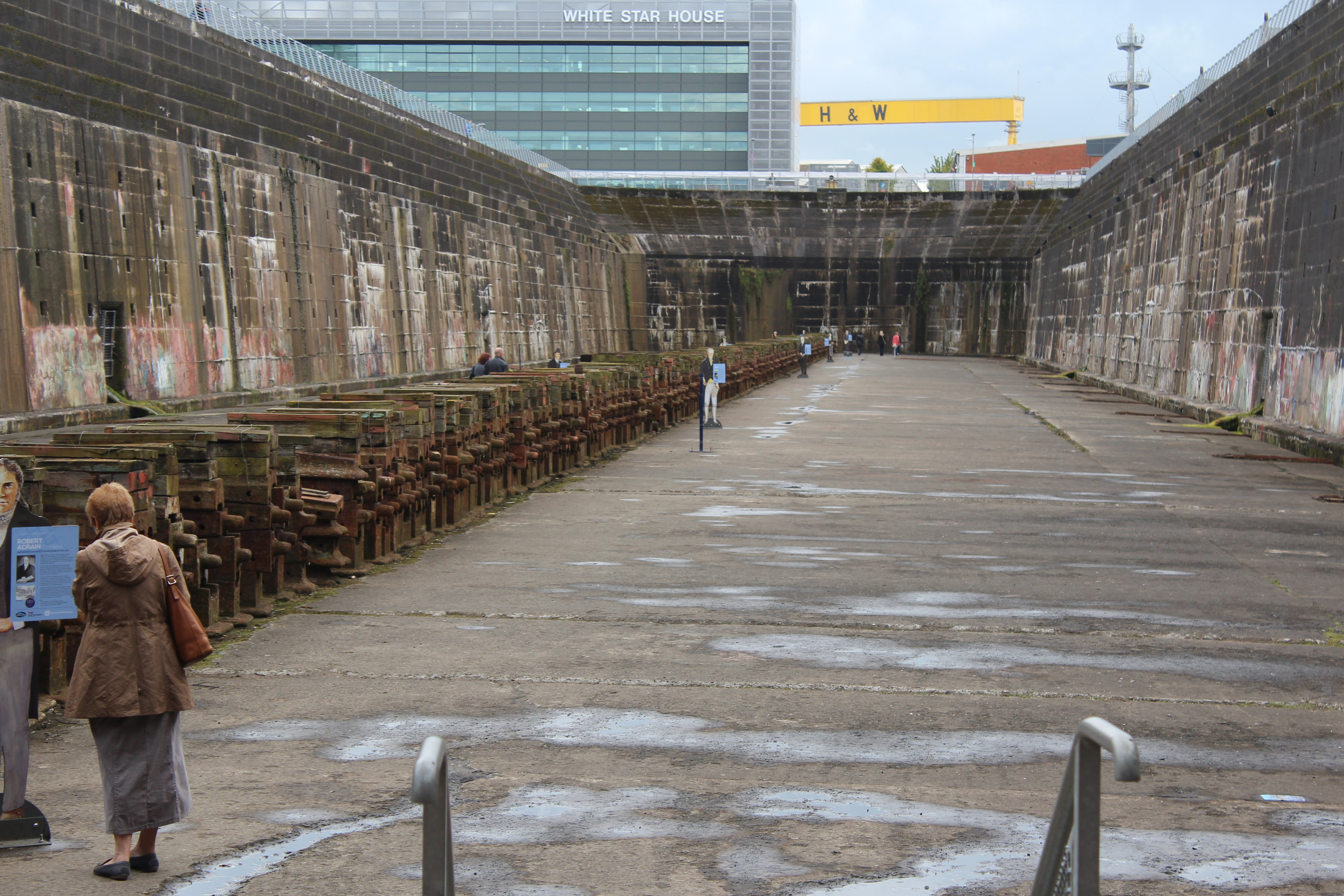
The dry dock with the White Star Line office

In October 1903, construction of Thompson Graving Dock was started. It was dug next to Alexandra Dock. The design was made in-house by the Belfast Harbour Commission. The work was carried out by contractors Walter Scott & Middleton.

The excavation of the new dry dock alongside Alexandra Dry Dock, caused two accidents. During construction, the action of the pumps at the new dock carried away a substratum of fine sand. It caused two subsidences of Alexandra Dock's walls. The first happened in October 1905 and a second more serious one happened in April 1906. The damage was so serious that Alexandra Dry Dock was only repaired by the end 1907. This made that several large ocean-going vessels had go to other ports for repairs or to be completed.

The plan was to finish the dry dock in three years and four months (i.e. February 1907), the above subsidences made that it took eight years. The cost came to 350,000 GBP, or $1,600,000. Thompson Graving dock was opened on 1 April 1911. The opening was a big event. Lord Pirrie, head of Harland & Wolff attended, as the largest ship of the world, RMS Olympic was towed into the dock. During a luncheon that followed the opening Lord Pirrie said that he expected that an even bigger dry dock would soon be required.

== Characteristics ==
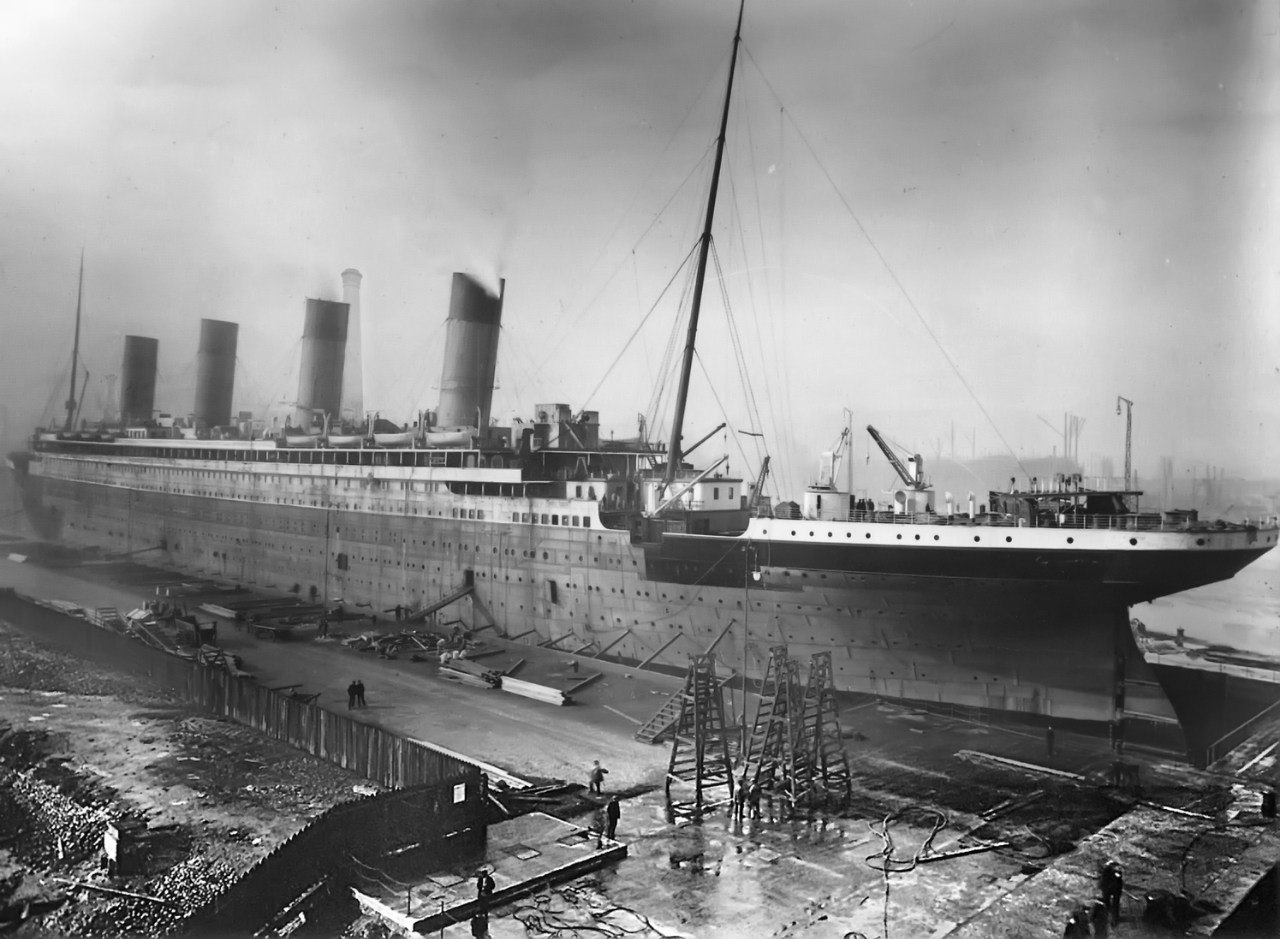
Titanic in Thompson Graving Dock

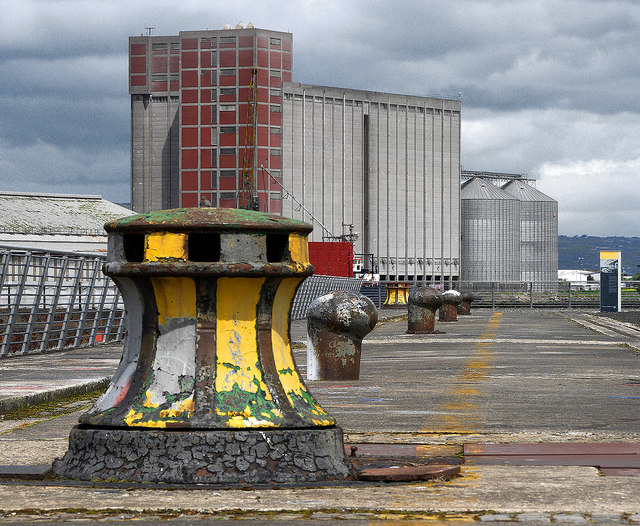
The capstan

Thompson Graving Dock resembles a big rectangular box dug out of the earth. Even so, it has sides and a floor covered in granite. The side walls are 18 ft (5.5 m) thick. The floor is 17 ft 6 in (5.3 m) thick. Like all the earlier docks in Belfast, it was made in stepped masonry. Stepped masonry is a technique to build a solid foundation in brick. Foundation is crucial to prevent a dry dock's floor from collapsing under the weight of a docked vessel. The side walls of the dock are rectangular, except for a series of steps near the top.

The dry dock was closed by a caisson gate. This is a large floating steel box. It can be flooded to seat it in the opening of the dock and close it. If enough water is pumped out of the caisson, it will float and can be moved to give clear access to ships that visit the dock. It seems that the original caisson gate was a ship caisson. It had a regular position, but it could also be placed against the outer quoin of the enctrance sill.

The pumping station of Thompson Dock is still standing. In fact, it is Alexandra Graving Dock's pump house, which had been expanded to serve both docks. It housed three sets of engines and pumps totalling almost 3,000 hp. The amount of water that had to be pumped out of course varied with the size of a docked ship. The pumphouse could empty the dock in 119 minutes if it had to pump out 23,000,000 gallons of water.

Ships were let into the dock, by towing them in by hand. At the land end of the dock, the massive capstan that was used to do this is still standing. The iron base of this is sunk more than 12 ft (3.7 m) into a cement foundation. Sixteen men pushed at eight bars that stuck out of it and so pulled a vessel like Titanic in by hand.

After a ship was let into the dock, the gate was closed and the water pumped out. The vessel had to be positioned exactly above the keel blocks on which it would land. These were positioned on the center line of the dock. Each keel block had to be below a frame, or the bottom might be damaged. To the sides, there were bilge blocks that supported the bilge of the vessel. These could also be used to prevent the keel from being shoved off of the blocks. The series of steps at the top of the side walls were called shoring steps or altars. They were used to place shores (beams) that kept a docked ship from falling over. Below that, there were square holes to place additional shores. The image of Olympic in the dock shows both kinds of blocks as well as the shores and square holes.

The length of Thompson Graving Dock was variable. The normal effective length was 850 ft 6 in (259.2 m). However, by placing the caisson gate against the outer quoin of the entrance sill, length increased to 886 ft 6 in (270.2 m). Even so, a ship like Titanic with an overall length of 882 ft 9 in (269.1 m) stuck out a bit over the entrance and or end of the dock. A somewhat irrelevant measure was the length at the line of coping. This was 900 ft (274.3 m), i.e. longer than any ship that could use the dock. The design of the dock was such that it could be lengthened by 200 ft (61.0 m) if longer ships required this.

The width of the dock is 100 ft (30.5 m) at the floor level. The entrance is 96 ft (29.3 m) wide. The width between the lines of coping (i.e. at the top) is 128 ft (39.0 m).

The height of the dock from the floor to the coping level is 42 ft 6 in (13.0 m). (or 43 ft 6 in (13.3 m)) For ships, the depth of the sill below the water level is the most relevant measurement, but this of course varies with the tide. Thompson dock's sill was 24 ft 6 in (7.5 m) below harbour datum. Measured against the tide, it was 33 ft 9 in (10.3 m) below flood level and 37 ft 9 in (11.5 m) below the ordinary spring tide level.

== Service ==
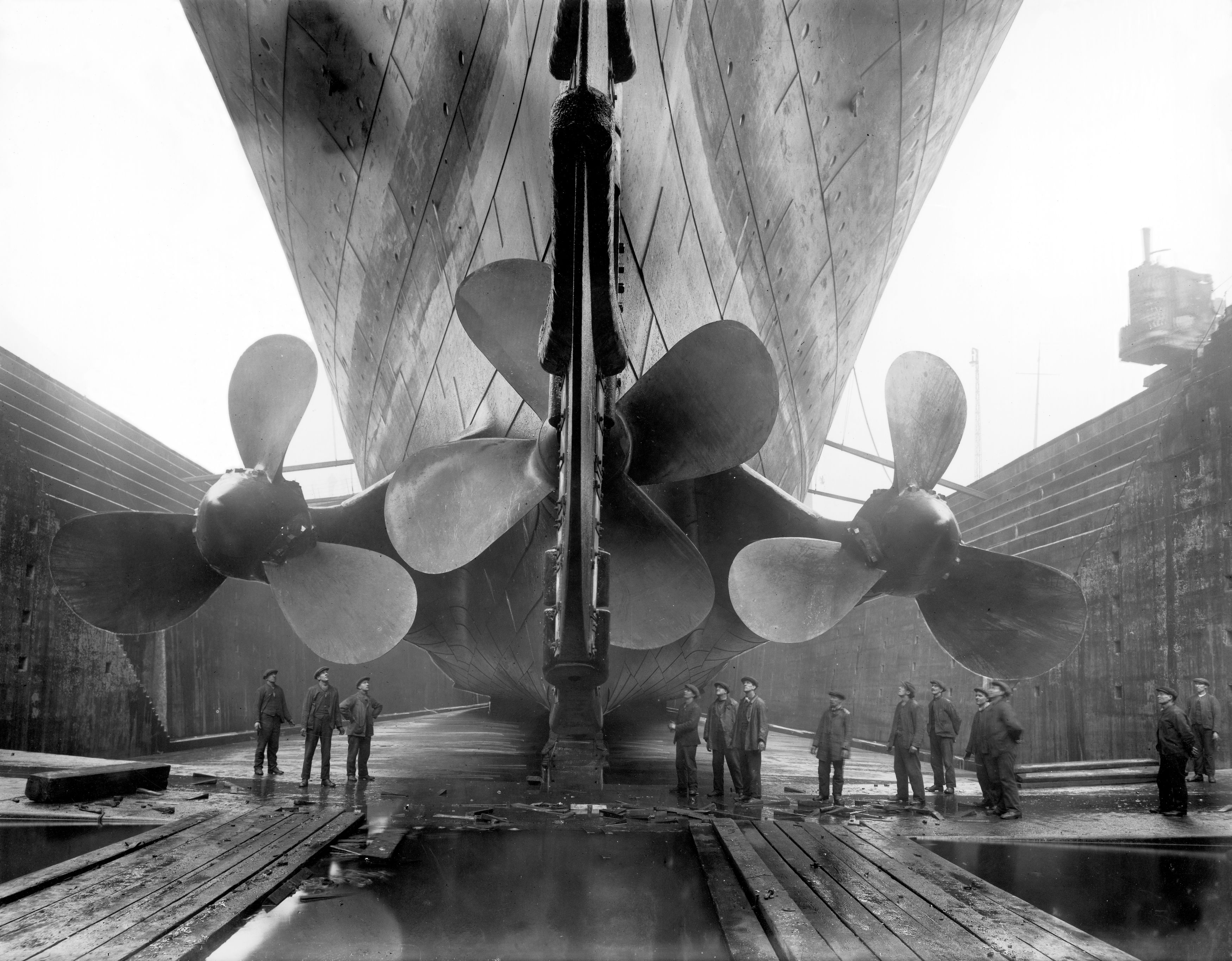
Olympic in Thompson dry dock

The first ship serviced by Thompson Graving Dock was Olympic. After being launched by Harland & Wolff's shipyard on 20 October 1910 Olympic, had been towed to a fitting out berth for further construction. She was pulled into Thompson Graving Dock during the opening ceremony of the dock on 1 April 1911. Olympic started her sea trials on 29 May 1911 and left Belfast on 31 May 1911.

Some details are known of the work done on ocean liners while in the dock. When Olympic entered the dock all kinds of barnacles and growth were removed by scrubbers on little scows. This was done while the water level in the dock descended. Next the propellers for Olympic were delivered to the dock and installed. Titanic also had her propellers fitted in the dock. It was also the place for furnishing Titanic's interiors and applying the red anti-fouling paint.

Soon after being taken into use, Olympic was involved in two incidents that made her require urgent repairs. On 20 September 1911 Olympic collided with the protected cruiser HMS Hawke in what became known as the Olympic–Hawke collision. Olympic suffered severe damage to her hull and was hit on the starboard propeller shaft and propeller. After provisional repairs in Southampton, Olympic arrived back in Belfast on 5 October. During repairs Olympic got parts meant for Titanic, delaying her construction. Olympic left Thompson Dock again on 14 November 1911.

Titanic was launched the same day that Olympic left Belfast for the first time, i.e. 31 May 1911. Titanic was pulled into Thompson Dock on 3 February 1912. On 24 February 1912, Olympic was damaged for the second time, when she lost a port side propeller blade. By then, the upgrade of Trafalgar Graving Dock in Southampton should have been completed, but it was not. Therefore, Olympic steamed to Belfast for repairs. On 6 March 1912, Titanic was moved out of the dock to allow Olympic in, see image. Olympic moved out again on 7 March.

By 1962, Thompson Dry Dock had become too small for the biggest ships that were being built. Therefore, between 1965 and 1968, Belfast Dry Dock was constructed. This is a reinforced concrete dock of 1,150 ft (350.5 m) by 160 ft (48.8 m). However, even while Harland and Wolff built some of the biggest ships in the 1970s, this was also the time that the European ship building industry started to get in serious trouble.

In 1991, the government decided to abandon Harland and Wolff. It delivered its last ship Anvil Point in 2003. Thompson dry dock seems to have fallen out of use in the 1990s. From 1 to 13 November 2000, Elektron was the last ship to use the dock. It was only allowed in, because she was damaged and almost sinking at the time. Thompson Graving Dock was closed down in 2002. It was later repurposed as a tourist attraction. The pumphouse now houses as whiskey distiller. Alexandra Graving Dock on the other side of the pumphouse is home to the museum ship HMS Caroline (1914).
