= Pier 2, Halifax =

Coordinates: 44.652773°N 63.577845°W

Pier 2 in Halifax, Nova Scotia was operational as an immigration shed from 1895 to 1915. 2.7 million immigrants entered Canada through the shed during this time. In 1895, a fire roared through the building and it was eventually rebuilt in 1911. The new facility was used as a port of departure for Canadian service men during the First World War and suffered damage during the Halifax Explosion in 1917.

Pier 21 opened in 1928 closer to the mouth of the Halifax Harbour which led to the closing of Pier 2 as an immigration shed. Today Pier 2's location is occupied by HMCS Scotian — whose address is 2111 Upper Water St, Halifax, Nova Scotia — the naval reserve base which is part of CFB Halifax.
