= White Swan Hotel, Alnwick =

Pub in Alnwick, Northumberland, England

The White Swan Hotel
- White Swan Hotel

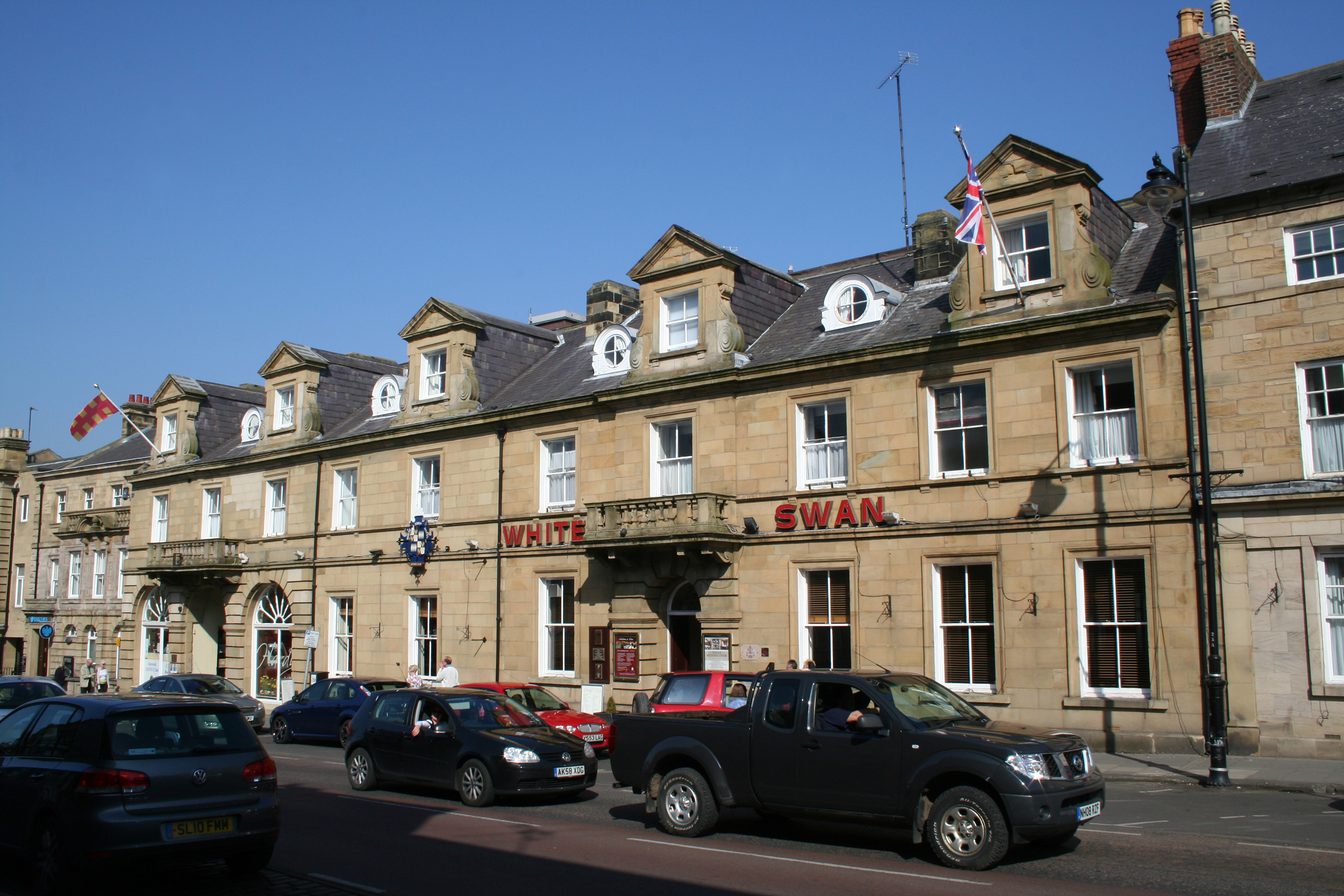
- White Swan Hotel, Grade II listed building.

- Location within Northumberland
- Hotel chain: Classic Lodges

General information
- Location: Alnwick, Northumberland, 18–20 Bondgate Within
- Coordinates: 55°24′46.86″N 1°42′15.97″W
- Opening: 18th century

Other information
- Number of suites: 57
- Parking: Yes

Website
- The White Swan Hotel

The White Swan Hotel is a hotel in the middle of the historic market town of Alnwick, Northumberland, England. The hotel is a 300-year-old coaching inn and is a Grade II listed building. Its most distinctive feature is the Olympic Suite, a large room furnished with interior decorations from RMS Olympic.

== History ==
Originally established in the 18th century, the inn is recorded by the Universal British Directory as one of two existing in Alnwick in 1791. The Gentleman's Magazine noted in 1797 that it was "occupied by a man named Wilson, who at one time had lived as footman in the Hervey family." W. Davison, writing in 1822, stated that the White Swan was "the principal inn ... at which the mail and union coaches stop, and all the posting on the great north road."

In 1852 Algernon Percy, 4th Duke of Northumberland brought in the architect Anthony Salvin to remodel his family seat at Alnwick Castle. Salvin also remodelled the White Swan at the same time; the current frontage dates from this period. Since then the hotel has expanded into neighbouring buildings, which have been incorporated into it and converted into bedrooms.

The hotel has undergone various extensions and renovations, including one in 1936 when its then owner, Algernon Smart, bought various elements from the decommissioned RMS Olympic and incorporated them into the fabric of the building.

== Description ==
The hotel is a two-storey building, faced with a mid-19th century facade built of ashlar with an attic. The building is roofed in slate with three chimneys. The attic storey has a row of nine dormer windows, five of pedimented style edged with carved side scrolls, alternating with four of circular form. The left portion of the building has an arcade of three bays with channelled rustication. The central bay and the arched main entrance are both surmounted with stone balconies.

Inside the hotel, which was given Grade II listed status on 25 August 1977, is the Olympic Suite, a room measuring 59 ft × 63 ft (18 m × 19 m) and 12 ft 3 in (3.73 m) high which is furnished with panelled walls and decorated ceilings taken from RMS Olympic. The room consists of three and a half bays and three aisles, with bay windows on the north and east sides. The hotel also incorporates elements of one of Olympic's staircases and a revolving door from the ship.

=== RMS Olympic fittings ===
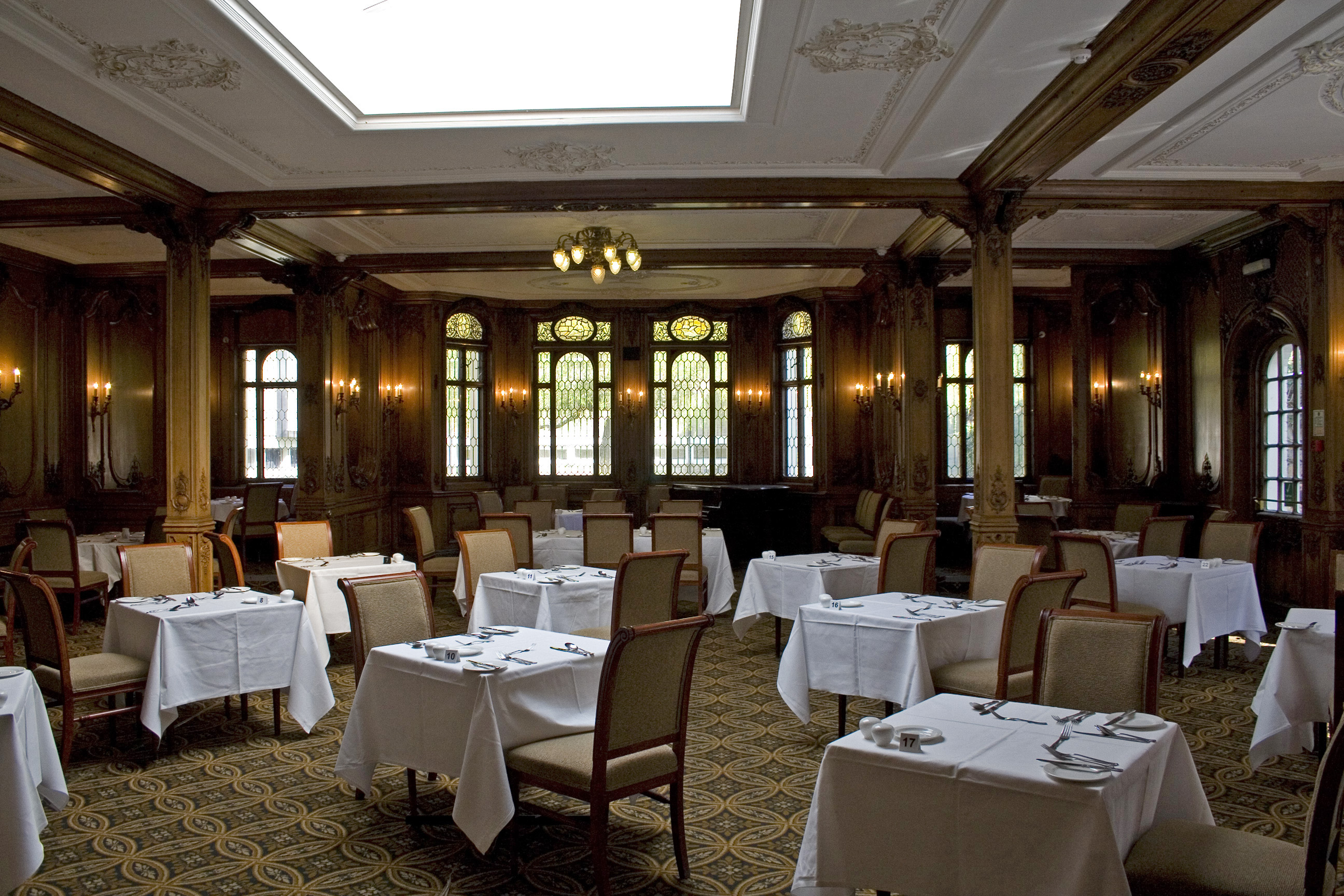
The Olympic Suite at the White Swan Hotel

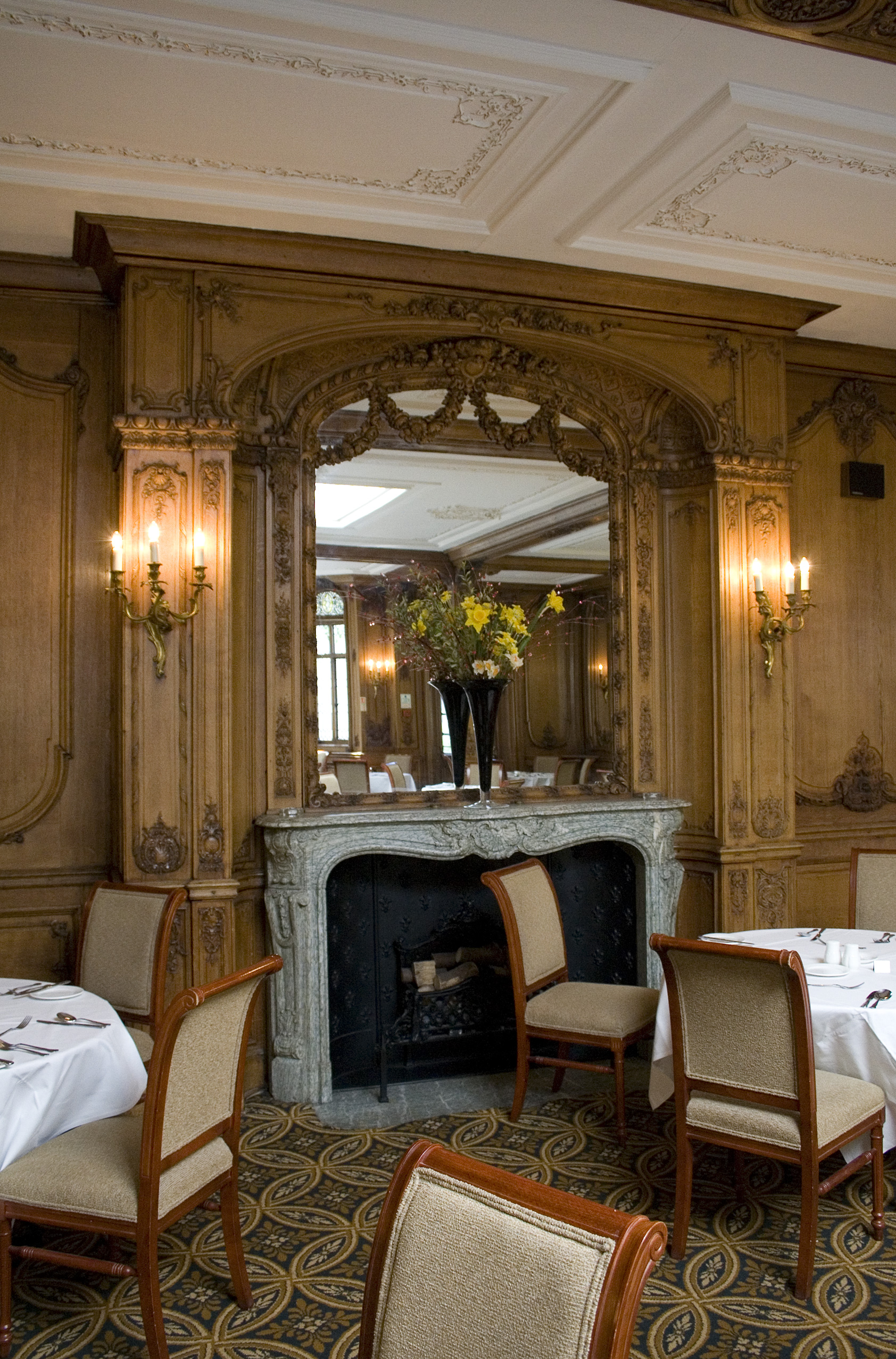
Marble fireplace from Olympic

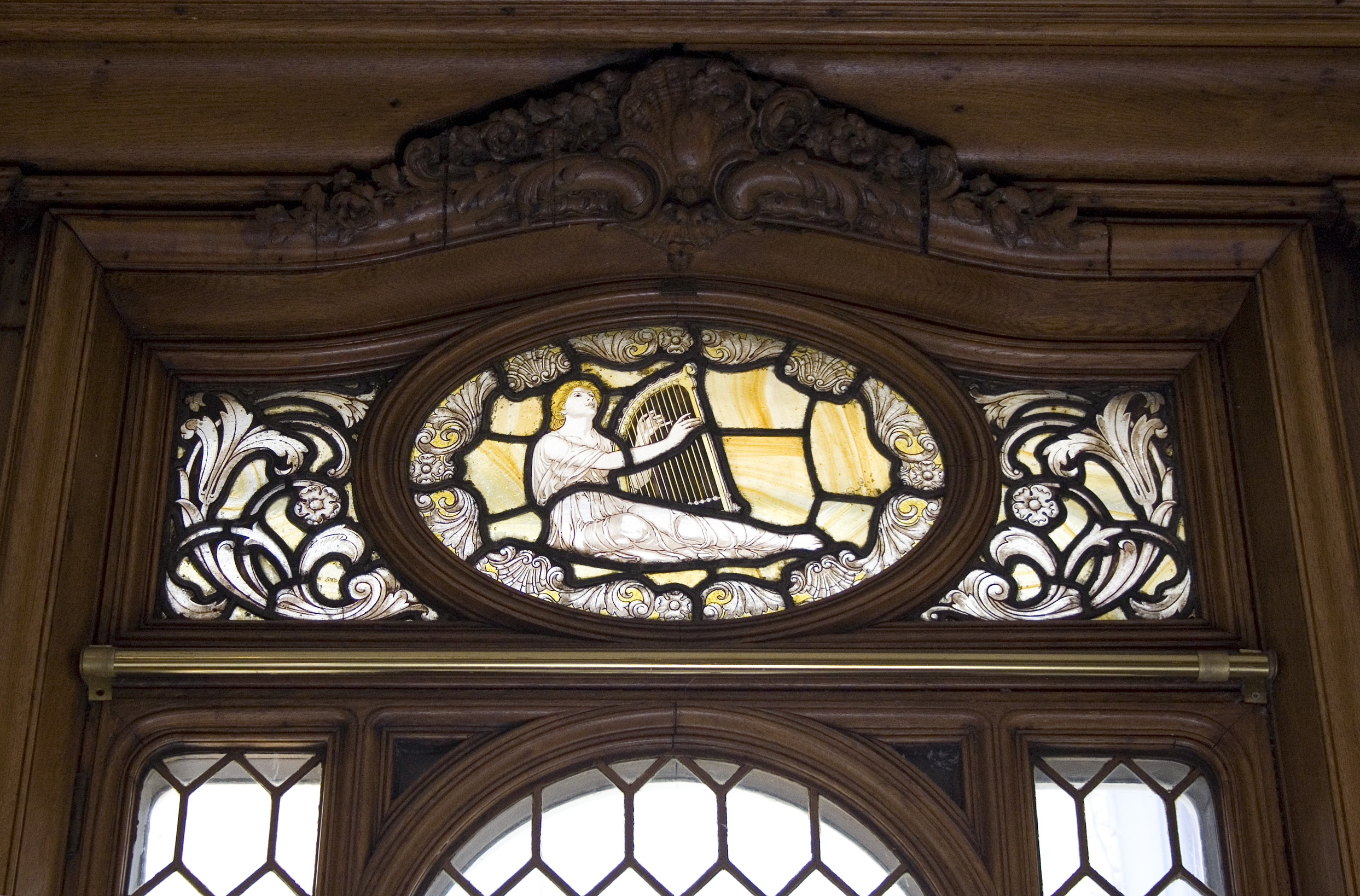
Stained glass window in the Olympic Suite

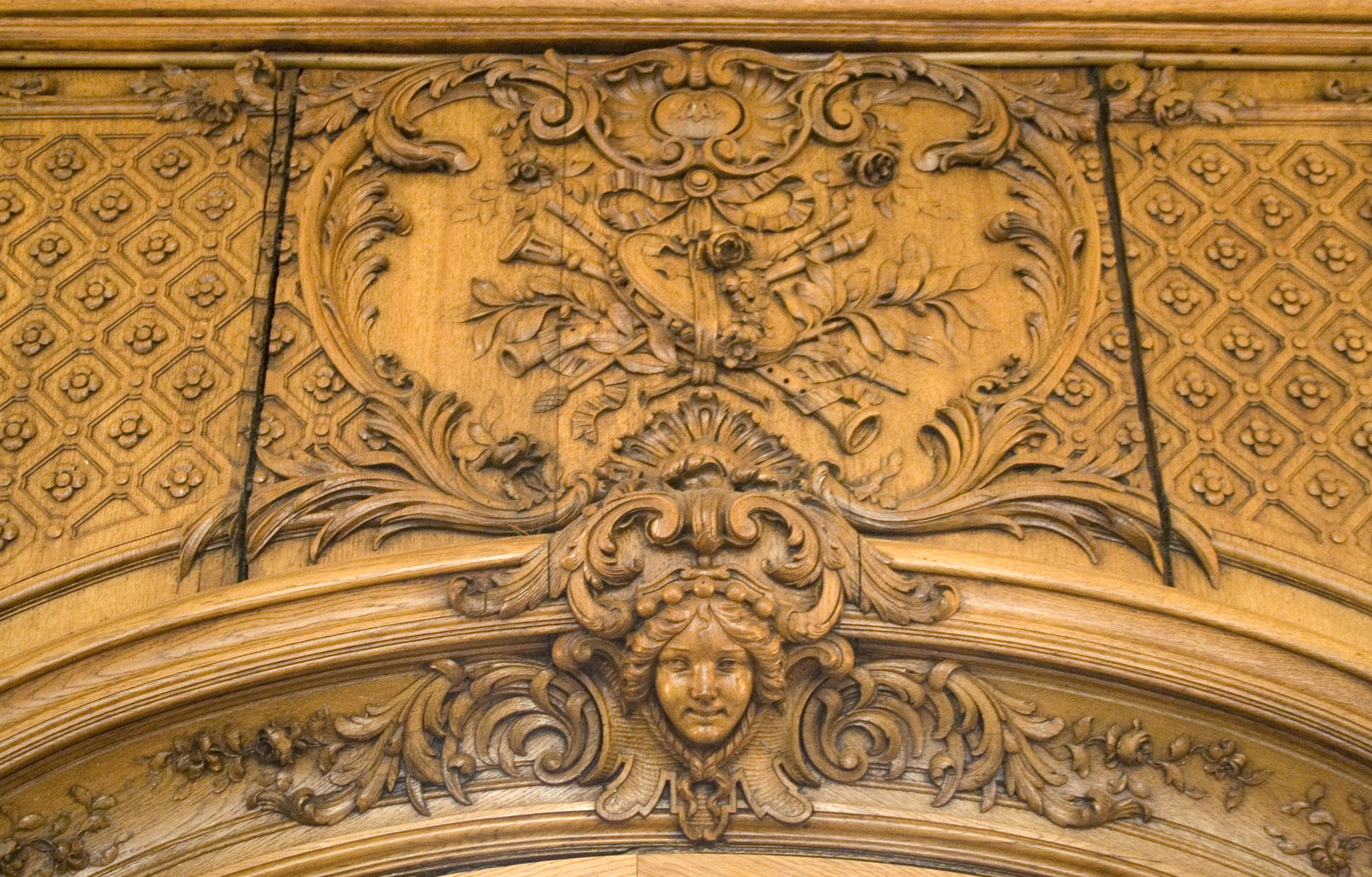
Detail of carvings above the Olympic Suite's entrance door

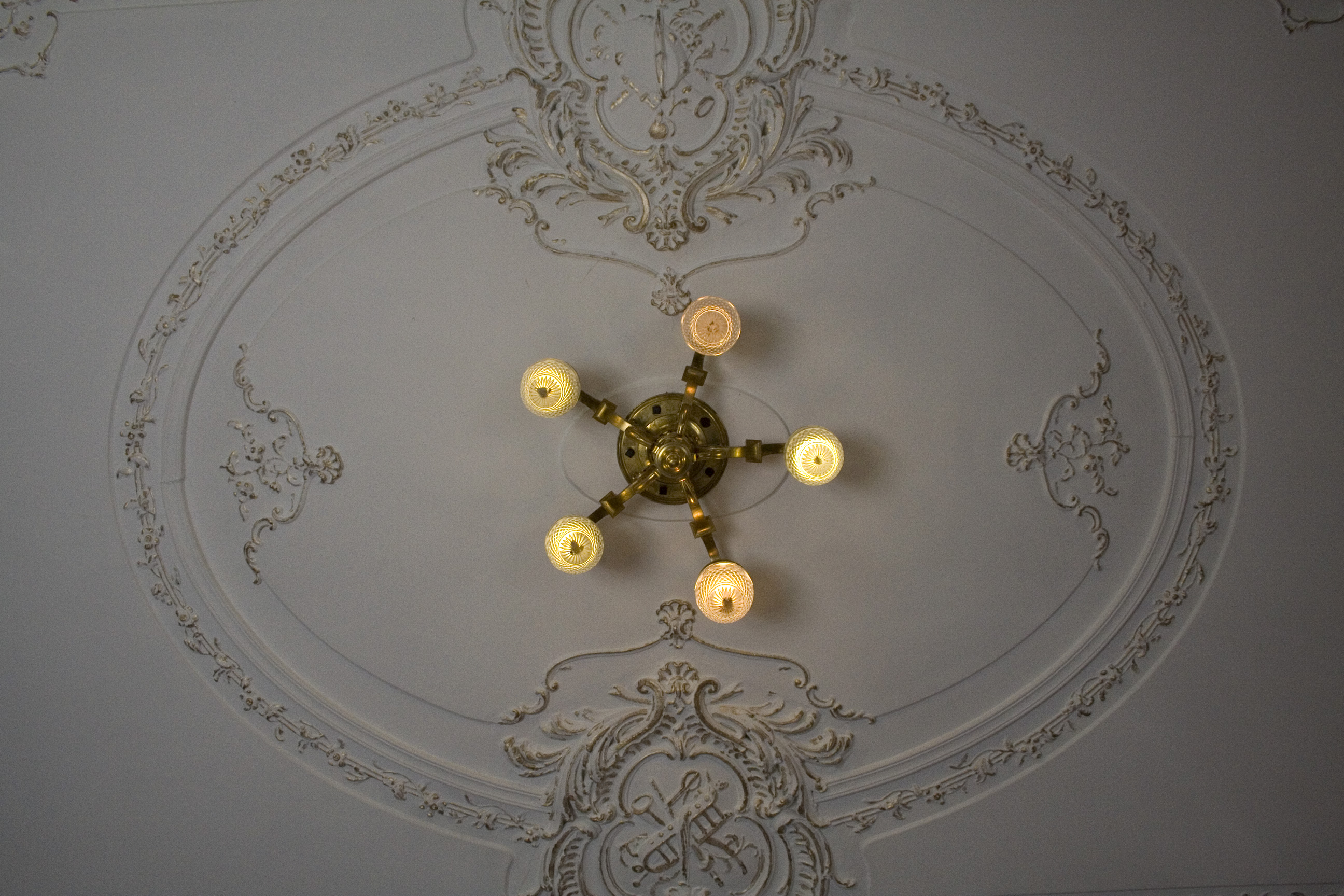
Ceiling decoration in the Olympic Suite

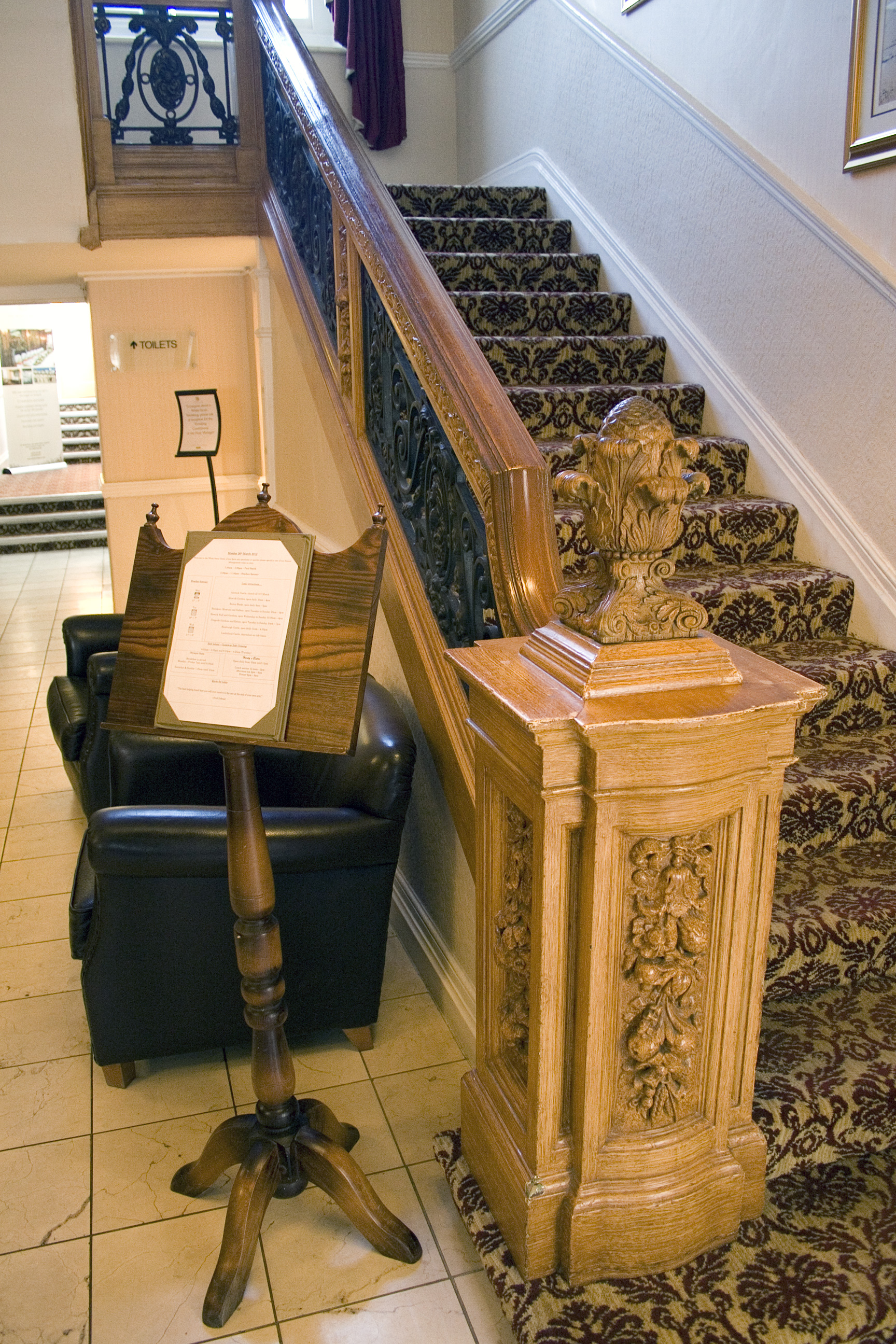
Staircase from Olympic

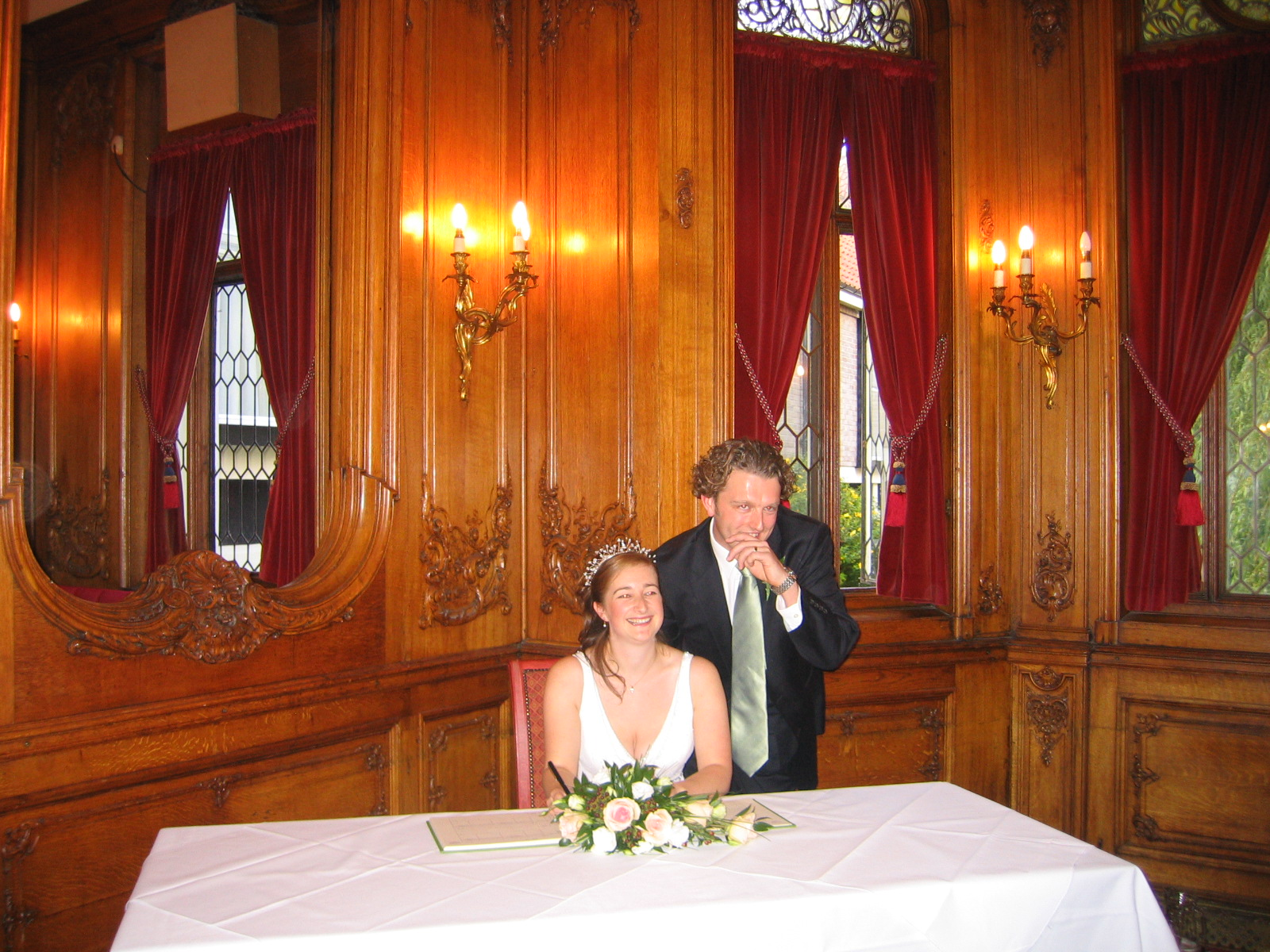
Panelled walls from Olympic

The hotel's Olympic Suite incorporates panelling, mirrors, a ceiling, and stained-glass windows that were removed from Olympic when she was being dismantled in Jarrow in 1936. Algernon Smart, the hotel's then-owner, had been a frequent traveller on Olympic and took part in the auction, by the London firm Knight Frank & Rutley, of the ship's fittings in November 1935. At the auction he had the winning bids for elements of the First Class Lounge, the D deck banister from the Grand Staircase, the Aft First Class Staircase, and the revolving door from the liner's restaurant.

The First Class Lounge on Olympic was identical to that of her sister ship Titanic; both were designed and fitted by the same teams of craftsmen and artisans, as the two ships were constructed at nearly the same time. The interiors of the ships were designed by Aldam, Heaton & Co., who had previously worked on other White Star Line vessels and had also carried out interior design on the homes of White Star Line chairman Bruce Ismay and his family. Many of the ships' interiors were designed by the architect Arthur Henry Durand, who had studied architecture in Brussels between 1891–3 and participated in the design of the Eiffel Tower in Paris. He set up his own practice in London in 1903 and worked for both the White Star Line and P&O.

The lounge was described at the time as "a magnificent salon, pronounced by many persons as the finest room ever built into a ship. It is more suggestive of a state apartment in a palace than a room on shipboard." The analogy was an apt one, as the room was decorated in the Louis XV style based on interiors at the Palace of Versailles. The walls were panelled with finest English oak carved with delicate boiseries decorated with scrolled floral-and-shell ornamentation, rather than the gilding that would have been seen in the French originals. At one end of the lounge was a non-functional grey marble fireplace with a carved mantelpiece and a curb of a pierced scroll-and-shell pattern, measuring 5 ft 6 in (1.68 m) wide in total. This too can be seen in the Olympic Suite.

The equivalent lounge on Titanic was described by The Shipbuilder magazine as a place where, during voyages, "passengers will indulge in reading, conversation, cards, tea-drinking and other social intercourse." It disintegrated during Titanic's sinking, releasing many wooden fragments to float to the surface while strewing metal fittings across the sea bed. The Olympic's fittings in the White Swan helped the oceanographer Robert Ballard to identify where the identical fittings from Titanic had come from when he found them in the debris field around the wreck of the Titanic. An archway from the lounge preserved at the hotel is identical to the same archway from Titanic that was recovered by ships from Halifax, Nova Scotia searching for bodies and is now displayed at the Maritime Museum of the Atlantic in Halifax.

The room's decoration was crafted by joiners and artisans working for the Belfast shipbuilders Harland & Wolff, either in sheds at the shipyards in Queen's Island, now the Titanic Quarter or brought in from outside contractors. No fewer than 186 woodcarvers worked on Olympic's fittings. The usual practice was for the designers to produce composite sketches showing the general concept of the surface and carvings of an interior feature, along with a sectional profile of the general shape and proportion of the sculptural elements relative to one another. It was not intended to be an actual plan but served instead to give the woodcarver a general concept of how the design was to look.

At the entrance to the hotel is the revolving door that was originally fitted to Olympic's First Class restaurant entrance. This was a feature that appeared only on Olympic, which needed a way of keeping sea breezes out of the room. Titanic had no such need as changes to the ship's design made a revolving door unnecessary.

The hotel also incorporates pieces from the Aft First Class Staircase. This was not as long or elaborate as the more famous forward Grand Staircase, as depicted in the 1997 film Titanic, but was decorated in a similar style, again in finely carved English oak. During the sinking of the Titanic, the ship split apart right across the aft staircase; many artefacts from it have been discovered in the wreck's debris field. However it has recently been discovered that at least the first portion of the staircase is in fact from the main Grand Staircase and not the Aft Staircase. This is due to the fact the staircase has thirteen steps and not eleven. A photo composite has proved the bannister's origin.

== See also ==
- Old Swan Hotel in Harrogate, also a member of the Classic Lodges group.
