= Witching Waves =

Amusement ride

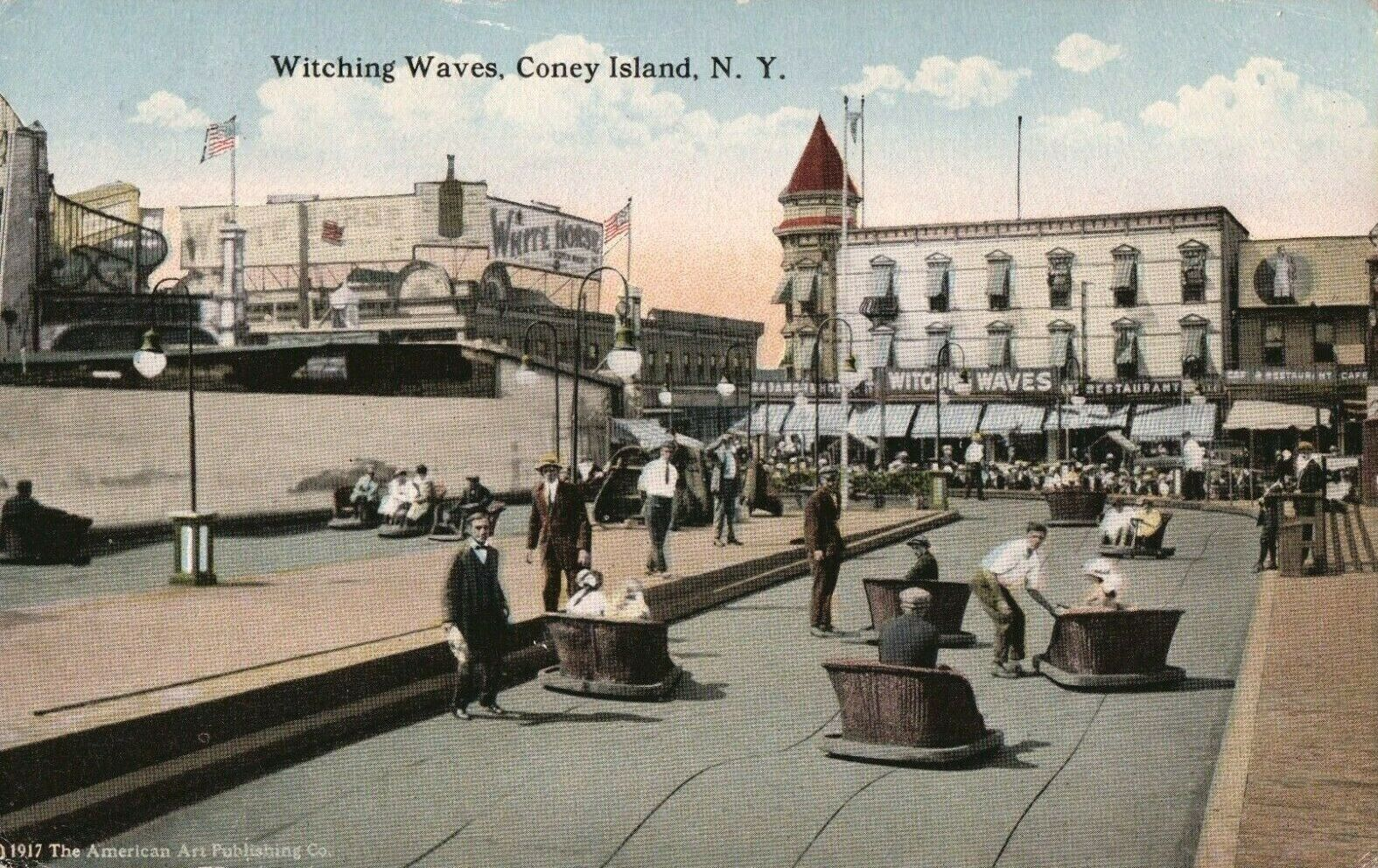
Postcard depicting Witching Waves ride at Luna Park in Coney Island, NY

Witching Waves is a historical flat ride that was installed at several amusement parks worldwide. The first was at Luna Park on Coney Island, New York, United States, in 1907, where it was one of the most popular rides.

It was invented by Theophilus Van Kannel, who also invented the revolving door. It consisted of a large oval course with a flexible metal floor. There were hidden reciprocating levers that produced a wave-like motion. The floor itself did not move but the moving wave propelled small scooter-style cars with two seats, which could be steered by the riders.

In 1910, it was installed on the Bowery in Manhattan, New York City.

It was installed at other amusement park locations, including Blackpool in England, London’s Imperial National Exhibition in 1909, Euclid Beach Park in Cleveland, Paragon Park in Massachusetts, Saturno Park in Barcelona, Rockaway Beach, and Palisades Park in New Jersey.

During the 1930s, the English poet John Betjeman described St Giles' Fair in Oxford as follows:

It is about the biggest fair in England. The whole of St Giles' … is thick with freak shows, roundabouts, cake-walks, the whip, and the witching waves.

The ride can be seen in use at Luna Park in the silent movies Coney Island with Roscoe Arbuckle and Buster Keaton from 1917 and Speedy with Harold Lloyd from 1928.

Accidents sometimes occurred on the ride.

== See also ==
- Bumper cars
