= Theophilus Van Kannel =

American inventor (1841-1919)

- Born: July 1851; Philadelphia, Pennsylvania, US
- Died: December 23, 1919 (aged 78); New York City, US
- Burial place: Pleasant Hill Cemetery, Monroe Township, Coshocton County, Ohio
- Occupation: Inventor
- Known for: Invention of the revolving door

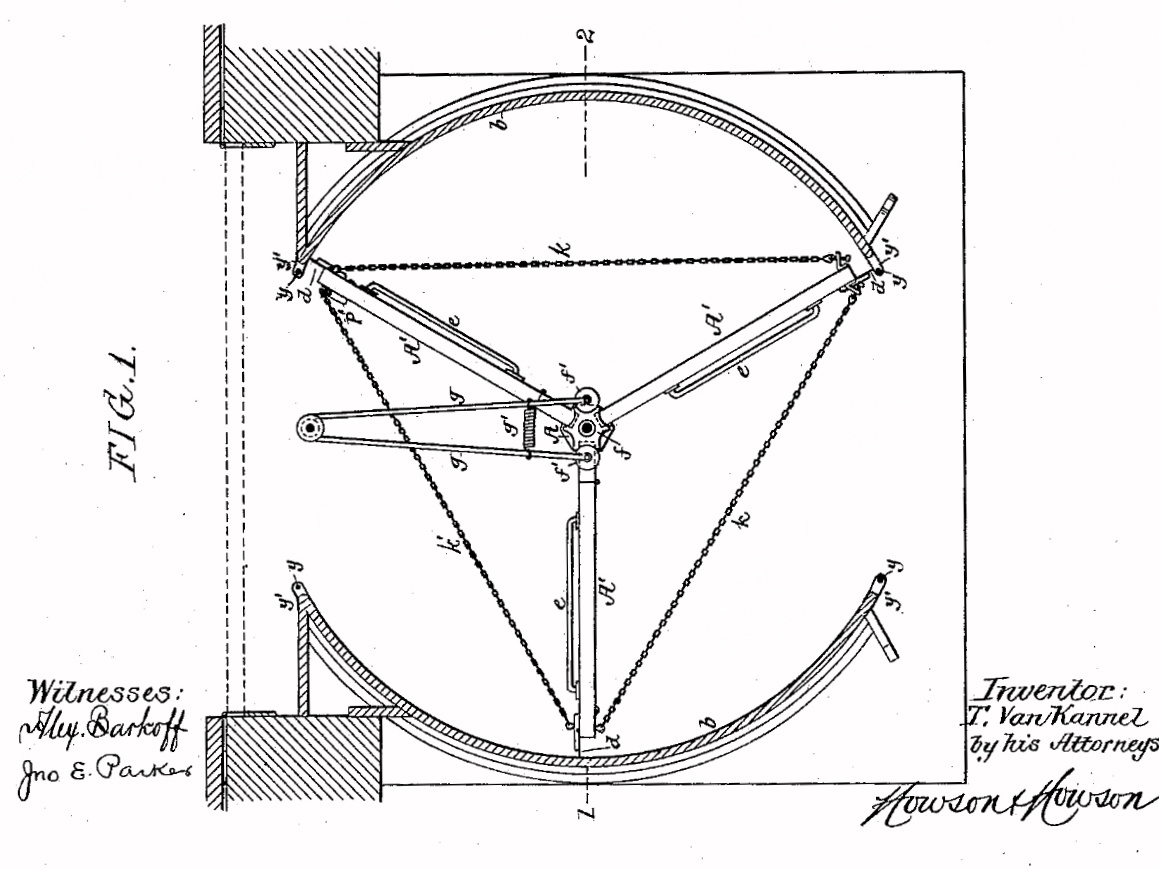
Theophilus Van Kannel's patent drawing for a revolving door, 1888

Theophilus Van Kannel (July 1851 – December 24, 1919) was an American inventor, known for inventing the revolving door, patented on August 7, 1888.

== Biography ==
He was born in Monroe Township, Coshocton County, Ohio, USA. Van Kannel, who was recognized for his invention with the John Scott Medal by the Franklin Institute in 1889, founded the Van Kannel Revolving Door Company, which eventually was bought out by the International Steel Company in 1907. International Steel Company is the parent company of International Revolving Door Company.

He invented and owned Witching Waves, an amusement ride introduced at Luna Park, Coney Island, in 1907.

Van Kannel died at the home of his brother, Benjamin Van Kannel in Coshocton County, Ohio.
