= International Steel =

International Steel can refer to:

- International Steel Company, a defunct Evansville, Indiana company, or
- International Steel Group, a defunct Cleveland, Ohio company
