= Revolving door =

Set of doors that rotate about a vertical shaft

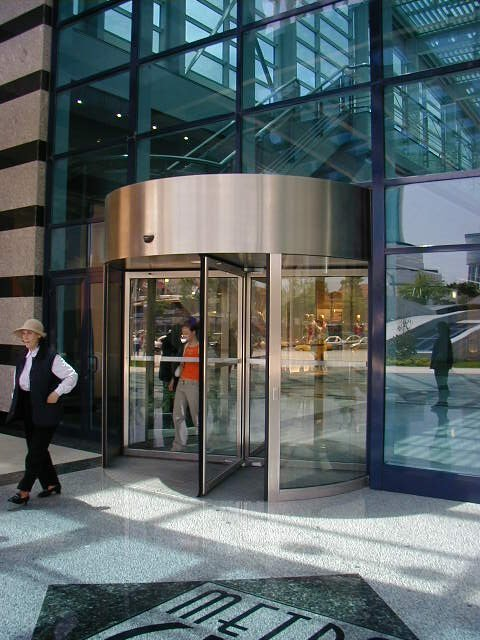
A revolving door in Turkey (counter-clockwise rotation)

A revolving door typically consists of three or four doors that hang on a central shaft and rotate around a vertical axis within a cylindrical enclosure. To use a revolving door, a person enters the enclosure between two of the doors and then moves continuously to the desired exit while keeping pace with the doors.

Revolving doors were designed to relieve the immense pressure caused by air rushing through high-rise buildings (referred to as stack effect pressure) while at the same time allowing large numbers of people to pass in and out. They are also energy efficient; they act as an airlock to prevent drafts, decreasing the loss of heating or cooling for the building as compared to a standard door.

== Construction ==
Diagram of a revolving door, viewed from above

Around the central shaft of the revolving door, there are usually three or four panels called wings or leaves. Large diameter revolving doors can accommodate pushchairs and wheeled luggage racks - such large capacity doors are sometimes H-shaped to split the circle into only two (hence larger) parts.

Some revolving door displays incorporate a small glass enclosure, permitting small objects such as sculpture, fashion mannequins, or plants to be displayed to pedestrians passing through. Such enclosures can either be mounted at the central pivot, or attached to the revolving door wings.

The wings of revolving doors usually incorporate glass, to allow people to see and anticipate each other while passing through the door. Manual revolving doors rotate with pushbars, causing all wings to rotate. Revolving doors typically have a "speed control" (governor) to prevent people from spinning the doors too fast.

Automatic revolving doors are powered above/below the central shaft, or along the perimeter. Automatic revolving doors have safety sensors, but there has been at least one fatality recorded.

Skyscraper design requires a means of draft block, such as revolving doors, to prevent the chimney effect of the tall structure from sucking in air at high speed at the base and ejecting it through vents in the roof while the building is being heated, or sucking in air through the vents and ejecting it through the doors while being cooled, both effects due to convection. Modern revolving doors permit the individual doors of the assembly to be unlocked from the central shaft to permit free flowing traffic in both directions. This feature, called breakout or break away, is typically used only during emergencies, or to admit oversize objects. The most effective method for this is the "bookfold" design, which allows all three or four wings to be broken away together. Normally, the revolving door is always closed so that wind and drafts cannot blow into the building, to efficiently minimize heating and air conditioning loads.

In right-hand traffic countries, revolving doors typically revolve counter-clockwise (as seen from above), allowing people to enter and exit only on the right side of the door. In left-hand traffic countries such as Australia and New Zealand, revolving doors revolve clockwise, but door rotations are mixed in Britain. Direction of rotation is often enforced by the door governor mechanism, or by the orientation of the door seal brush (weatherstrips).

== Security ==
An unusual pair of revolving doors at City Hall in London: one revolves clockwise; the other revolves counterclockwise.

Revolving doors can also be used as security devices to restrict entry to a single person at a time if the spacing between the doors is small enough. This is in contrast to a normal door which allows a second person to easily "tailgate" behind an authorized person. Extreme security can require a particular type of bullet-resistant glass.

Sometimes a revolving door is designed for one-way traffic. An example is the now-common usage in airports to prevent a person from bypassing airport security checkpoints by entering the exit. Such doors are designed with a brake that is activated either by mechanical means or by a sensor should someone enter from the incorrect side. The door also revolves backwards to permit that person to exit. More sophisticated electronic brakes also notify security of attempts to enter the door from the wrong side.

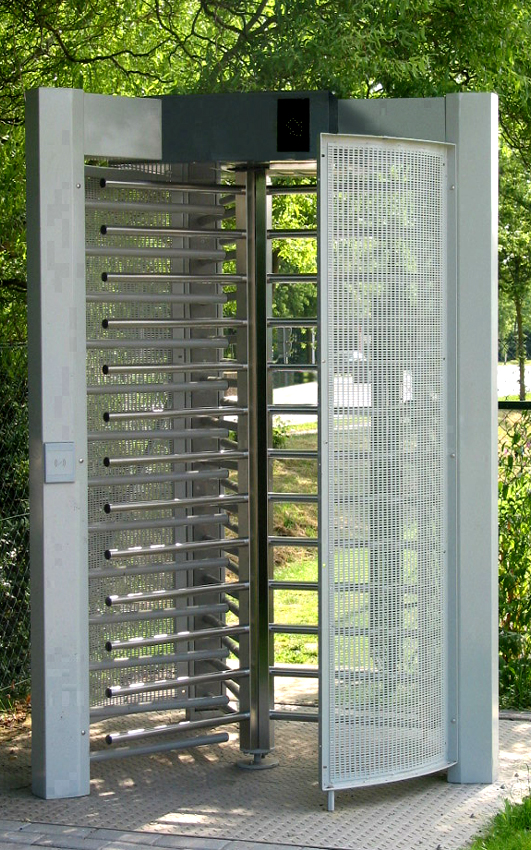
A one-way High Entrance/Exit Turnstile (HEET)

Turnstile exit-only doors are also often used in subways and other rapid transit facilities to prevent people from bypassing fare payment. They are similarly used at large sports stadiums, amusement parks, and other such venues, to allow pedestrians to exit freely, but not to enter without paying admission fees. These doors usually work mechanically, with the door panels constructed of horizontal bars which pass through a "wall" of interlacing (interdigitated) bars, allowing the door leaves to pass through, but blocking people from illegally entering through the exit.

== Emergency use ==
On November 28, 1942, the Cocoanut Grove, a popular nightclub in Boston, Massachusetts, went up in flames, killing 492 people. One of the main reasons cited for the large number of casualties was the single revolving door located at the entrance. As the mob of panicking patrons attempted to use the door as an escape it soon became jammed, trapping victims between the door and the crowd pushing towards it. As a result, many people died from smoke inhalation.

In 1943, it became a Massachusetts state law requirement to flank a revolving door with an outward swinging hinged door or to make the revolving door collapsible (so it becomes a double partition collapsing at 180°), allowing people to pass on either side. American revolving doors are now collapsible. Some jurisdictions require them to be flanked by at least one hinged door, or this is a common practice. For example, the Ontario Building Code 3.4.6.14. asserts that a revolving door needs to "(a) be collapsible, (b) have hinged doors providing equivalent exiting capacity located adjacent to it".

== History ==
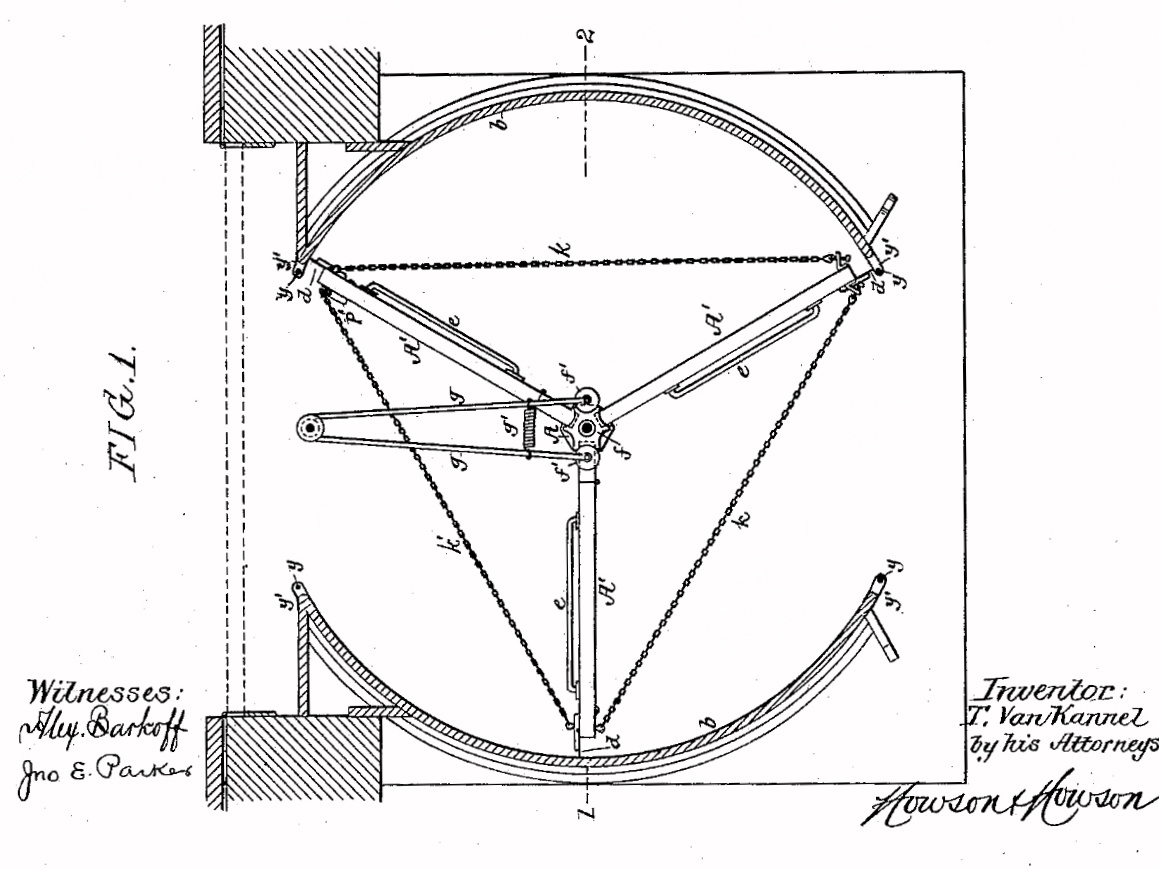
Patent drawing by Theophilus Van Kannel for a "Storm-Door Structure", 1888

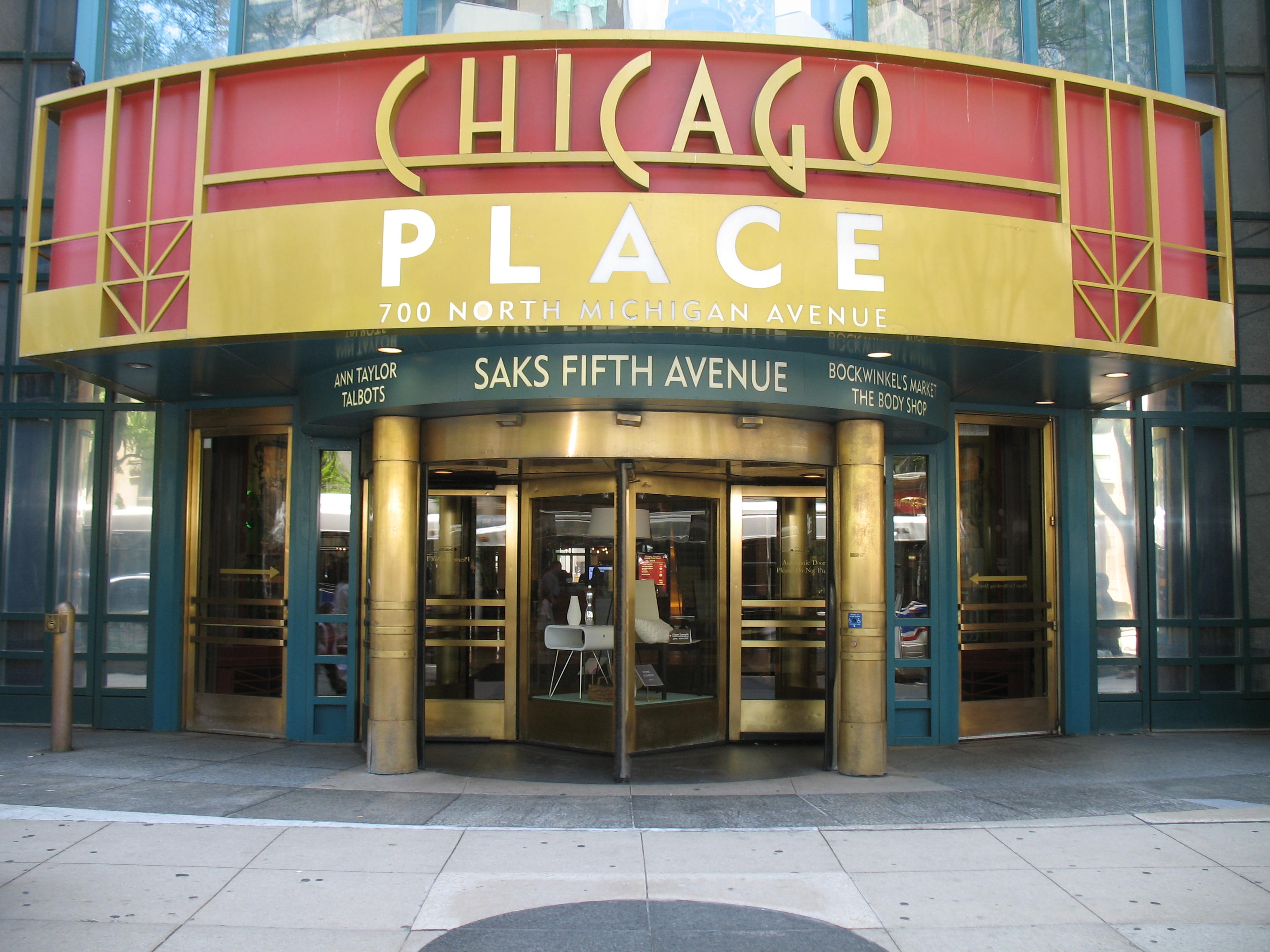
Large revolving door with a central display case (counter-clockwise rotation). The revolving door is flanked on both sides by conventional doors with arrows pointing inward towards the preferred entry.

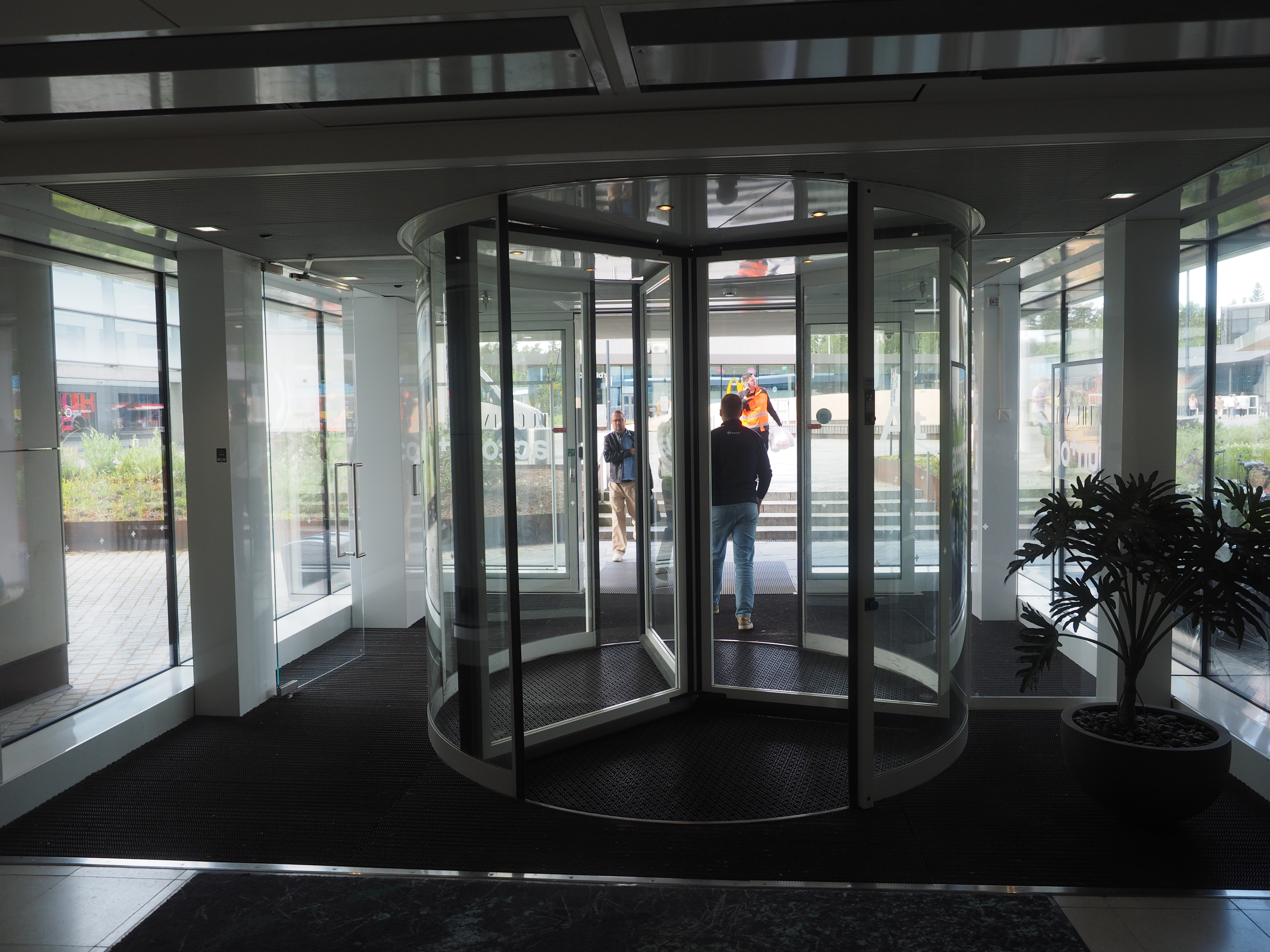
Revolving doors at an office building in Espoo, Finland, viewed from the inside of the building

H. Bockhacker of Berlin was granted German patent DE18349 on 22 December 1881 for Tür ohne Luftzug or 'Door without draft of air', which used a rotating cylinder with a door which, after entering, the user then turned around to the exiting direction.

Theophilus Van Kannel of Philadelphia obtained US patent 387,571 on 7 August 1888, for a "Storm-Door Structure". The patent drawings filed show a three-partition revolving door. The patent describes it as having "three radiating and equidistant wings ... provided with weather-strips or equivalent means to insure [sic] a snug fit". The door "possesses numerous advantages over a hinged-door structure ... it is perfectly noiseless ... effectually prevents the entrance of wind, snow, rain or dust ..." "Moreover, the door cannot be blown open by the wind ... there is no possibility of collision, and yet persons can pass both in and out at the same time." The patent further lists "the excluding of noises of the street" as another advantage of the revolving door. It goes on to describe how a partition can be hinged so as to open to allow the passage of long objects through the revolving door. The patent itself does not use the term revolving door.

An urban legend, dating back to perhaps 2008, claims that the invention was motivated by Van Kannel's phobia of opening doors for others, especially women; according to Snopes, there is no evidence to support this.

In 1889, the Franklin Institute of Philadelphia awarded the John Scott Legacy Medal to Van Kannel for his contribution to society. In 1899, the world's first wooden revolving door was installed at Rector's, a restaurant on Times Square in Manhattan, located on Broadway between West 43rd and 44th Streets. In 2007 Theophilus Van Kannel was inducted into the National Inventors Hall of Fame for this invention.

== Research ==
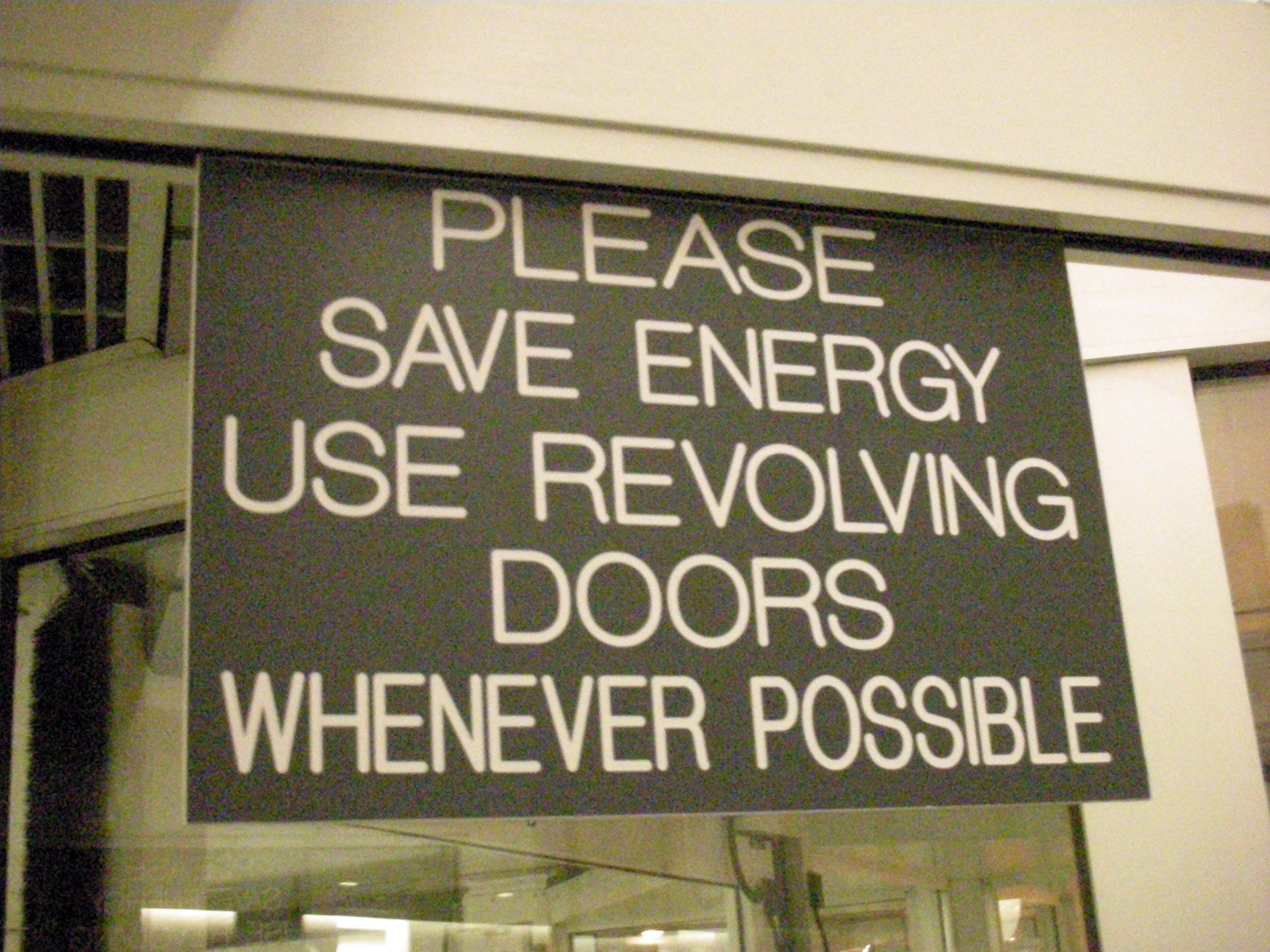
Revolving doors are favored because they can be used as an airlock to minimize a building's heating and air conditioning losses.

Research into the air and energy exchanges associated with revolving door usage have been carried out on a few occasions. The earliest such study was carried out in 1936 by A. M. Simpson, who worked for the van Kannel revolving door company at the time. Simpson's study was followed by a study by Schutrum et al. in 1961, and more recently a study by van Schijndel et al. in 2003. These studies focused on providing detailed measurements of the quantities of air and heat transferred inside the compartments of a door as it revolves. With the exception of the study by van Schijndel et al., which was purely theoretical, the measurements carried out for the other studies were used to provide design charts enabling engineers to estimate the quantity of air transferred by a door in function of the revolution rate and temperature contrast. However, none of these studies are referenced by existing design codes.

The aforementioned studies are specific to the type of door which they were acquired for, namely 2 m × 2 m (6.6 ft × 6.6 ft) doors with four compartments. Although it appears that these dimensions were standard for four-compartment doors at the time, this is not the case nowadays. A more recent experimental study carried out at Imperial College London's Department of Civil and Environmental Engineering, provided more insight into the flow physics by which air is transferred across a revolving door.

Airflows and energy losses through revolving doors also occur as a result of leakages past the seals of the door. Leakages are common to any type of opening in an otherwise closed space, but have been investigated in the context of revolving doors by Zmeureanu et al. and by Schutrum et al. before that. The first study concluded that to avoid significant leakages, the seals of the doors should be maintained and periodically replaced if needed. The second study produced design charts for estimating the leakage rate through a revolving door. Unlike the curves for estimating the transfer rate also published in this study, the curves for estimating the leakage rate are more generic. As such these design curves still form the basis of the target leakage rates for revolving doors recommended by the ASHRAE standard 90.1 in the US. On May 25, 2006, an MIT Study entitled "Modifying Habits Towards Sustainability: A Study of Revolving Doors Usage on the MIT Campus" was published. In it, B. A. Cullum, Olivia Lee, Sittha Sukkasi and Dan Wesolowski concluded, "...substantial energy is saved when people use the revolving doors instead of swing doors – the smallest of habit changes contributes to energy conservation... Modification of one habit... indeed has the ability to eventually impact the environment on a global scale."

While preferred by building owners for energy conservation, revolving doors may be avoided by some people due to the perceived greater physical effort in using them.

== See also ==
- Paternoster lift
- Revolving door (politics)
- Turnstile
