= International Steel Company =

Defunct American steel company based in Evansville, Indiana

- Founded: 1961
- Fate: Defunct

International Steel Company was a steel company in Evansville, Indiana that created the Landing Ship, Tank (LST) warships for World War II. There are historical tours of the USS LST-325 in dock on the Ohio River in Evansville. The current remaining division of International Steel Co. is called International Revolving Door in Evansville, Indiana.

It was incorporated in 1910.
