= SS Gothic (1893) =

Ocean liner

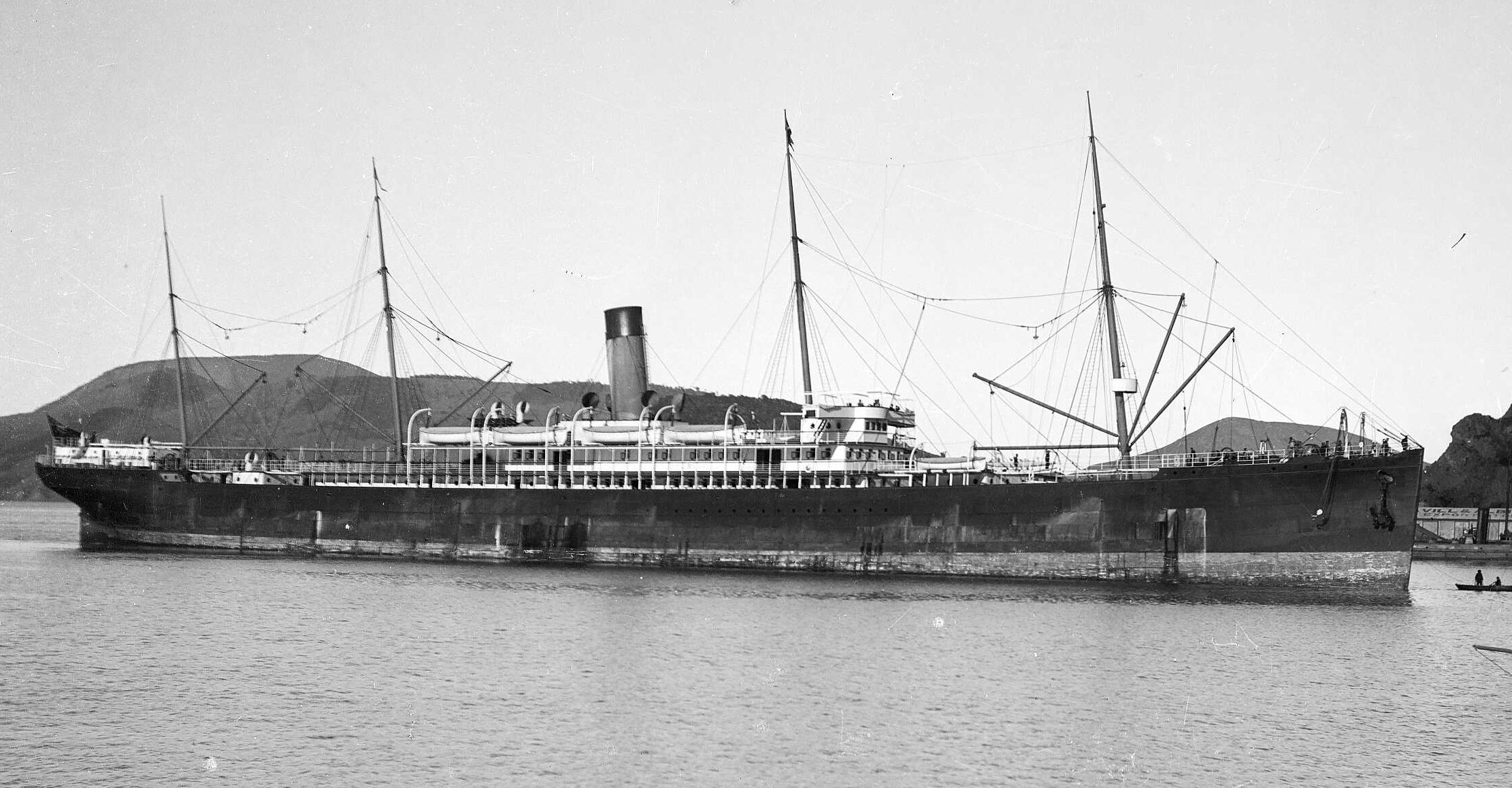
- The Gothic in Koputai Bay, Port Chalmers, Dunedin, New Zealand

History

United Kingdom
- Name: Gothic (1893–1907); Gothland (1907–1911); Gothic (1911–1913); Gothland (1913–1925)
- Operator: White Star Line (1893–1907); Red Star Line (1907–1911); White Star Line (1911–1913); Red Star Line (1913–25)
- Builder: Harland & Wolff
- Yard number: 267
- Launched: 28 June 1893
- Completed: 28 November 1893
- Maiden voyage: 28 December 1893
- In service: 1893–1925
- Fate: Scrapped in 1926
- Notes: Originally designed for the North Atlantic run

General characteristics
- Type: Ocean liner
- Tonnage: 7,755 GRT
- Length: 493 ft (150.3 m)
- Beam: 53 ft (16.2 m)
- Decks: Three Refrigerated
- Installed power: Two triple expansion steam reciprocating engines
- Propulsion: Two screws
- Speed: 14.5 knots (26.9 km/h; 16.7 mph)
- Capacity: 104 first class; 114 third class

SS Gothic was an ocean liner, built in 1893 at the Harland & Wolff Shipyards for the White Star Line. She was 490 feet (150 m) long and 53 feet (16 m) wide and 7,755 gross registered tons. For much of her later career she was transferred back and forth between White Star and Red Star Line, a IMM Co. subsidiary.

== Background ==
Gothic was built for the North Atlantic trade, but it was soon decided that she would be dedicated to the UK to New Zealand via Cape Town service, which the White Star Line ran jointly with the Shaw, Savill & Albion Line. She joined three older ships on this route; the Coptic, Doric and Ionic.

== Characteristics ==
Gothic was a combined cargo and passenger ship, and most of her internal space was dedicated to cargo carrying, with several large refrigerated cargo holds, designed for transporting frozen meat products from New Zealand to the UK, with a capacity for up to 71,000 frozen carcasses of mutton. These used a carbon anhydryde refrigeration system.

Her passenger accommodation had capacity for a relatively modest number of passengers in two classes; 104 in first class, and 114 in third class.

She had two propellers, powered by two triple expansion steam engines which generated a combined 4,400 indicated horsepower (3,300 kW), which propelled the ship to a maximum speed of 14 knots (26 km/h; 16 mph).

== Career ==
She set out on her maiden voyage on 28 December 1893. On her third voyage she set a new record on the route of 37 days, 10 hours and 16 minutes between Plymouth and Wellington with an average speed of 14.16 knots (26.22 km/h; 16.30 mph).

Her running mates Coptic and Doric were withdrawn from the New Zealand service in 1894–95 following a downturn in trade, which left only Gothic and Ionic maintaining the service. From 1902 she was joined on the route by three new running mates; Athenic, Corinthic and a new Ionic.

During the summer of 1902, Gothic was used to repatriate New Zealand troops from South Africa following the end of the Boer War, She picked them up at Cape Town on her normal route.

In June 1906, as she was on an inbound voyage from New Zealand a fire broke out in a cargo space beneath the first class section of the ship, this was put out, but it flared up again as the ship approached Plymouth. The passengers were disembarked onto a tender, by which time the fire was raging, and Gothic had to be towed to Plymouth harbour, where she was hastily beached. The fire was eventually put out, but severe damage had been caused to the ship's cargo and passenger accommodation. She was sent back to her builders for repairs and a major refit, which lasted for eight months. She emerged with her passenger capacities altered to 104 second class, and 250 third class passengers, as some of her cargo space was reallocated to passenger use.

She returned to service, and made her last sailing to New Zealand at the end of 1907, following this, she was converted into an immigrant ship and transferred to one of White Star's sister companies, within IMM the Red Star Line, and was renamed SS Gothland. where she was put to use on the Antwerp to Philadelphia route. This was short-lived, as in 1911, she was transferred back to White Star with her name returned to Gothic, and she was used on the Australia service. Two years later, she once again transferred to the Red Star Line as Gothland, and put to use on the Rotterdam to Quebec City and Montreal route.

In June 1914 she grounded on a rock off the Scilly Isles and her 281 passengers had to be transferred to another ship and taken ashore. She had to be towed to Southampton for repairs, which lasted for six months, when she re-entered service World War I was raging, and she made irregular sailings on the Rotterdam to New York route during the war. She also made several journeys for the Commission for Relief in Belgium. After the war, she underwent another refit in 1919, and was placed on the Antwerp-New York-Baltimore service until May 1921, when she made a single, and final journey for the White Star Line, still as Gothland from Naples to New York. She was then laid up until 1923, until returning to service on an experimental Antwerp-Vigo-Halifax-New York service, but this was not a success, and she returned to the Antwerp-Philadelphia route until her last sailing in March 1925. She was sold for scrap in November that year, and broken up the following year.
