= Athenic-class ocean liner =

Three ship class of ocean liners

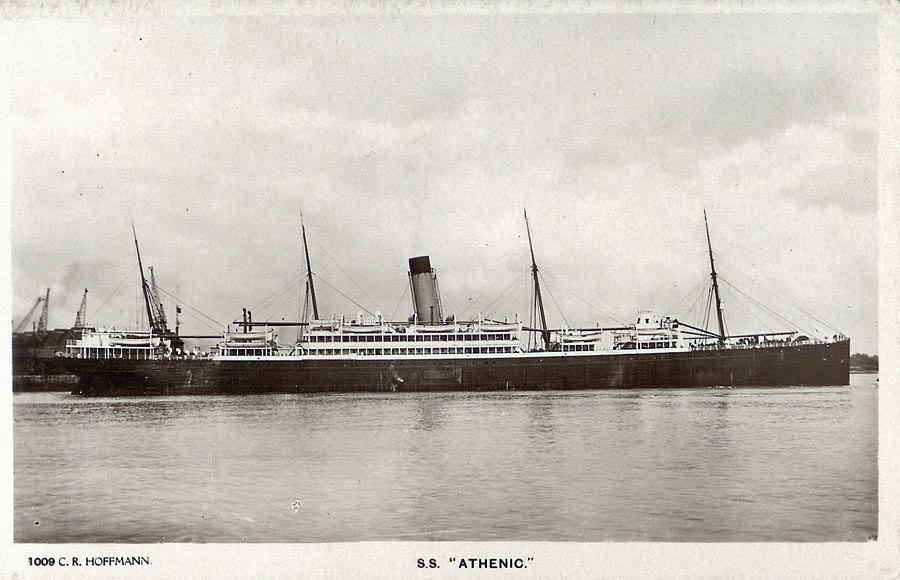
- SS Athenic

Class overview
- Builders: Harland & Wolff, Belfast, Ireland
- Operators: White Star Line
- Preceded by: "Big Four"
- Succeeded by: Olympic class
- Built: 1902–1903
- In service: 1902–1962
- Completed: 3
- Retired: 3

General characteristics
- Type: Ocean liner
- Tonnage: app. 12,352 ton
- Length: 500.3 ft (152.5 m)
- Beam: 63.3 ft (19.3 m)
- Propulsion: Twin propellers (driven by Quadruple expansion engines)
- Speed: 14 knots (26 km/h)
- Capacity: 690 passengers: 120 First Class, 120 Second Class, 450 Third Class

The Athenic-class ocean liners were a trio of ocean liners built by Harland & Wolff shipyard for the White Star Line in the early 20th century, designed for the profitable London to New Zealand service. The class consisted of three ships: SS Athenic, SS Corinthic, and SS Ionic. Each was constructed with the intention of serving the passenger and cargo route between London and Liverpool to Wellington and Auckland. These ships were dual-purpose, equipped to carry both passengers and cargo, including refrigerated goods such as meat.

In 1928, Athenic was sold to a Norwegian firm and converted into a whaling ship. Her successful conversion led to the acquisition of several other half-sisters, including the Runic, Medic, and Suevic, who eventually became part of the whaling industry alongside her. The SS Corinthic was scrapped in 1931. In the Second World War, the Athenic was torpedoed twice and sunk by U-69 but was raised and returned to her owner both times. She was scrapped in 1962. In 1934, the Ionic was sold to the Shaw, Savill & Albion Line and was scrapped two years later.

The three vessels garnered immense respect in New Zealand, to the extent that upon the announcement of the sale of the last Athenic, the RMS Ionic, the Mayor of Auckland, Ernest Davis, requested the Shaw Savill & Albion Line to consider presenting the ship's bell to the city as a commemorative token during the vessel's final visit to New Zealand.
