= Olympic-class ocean liner =

Trio of ocean liners

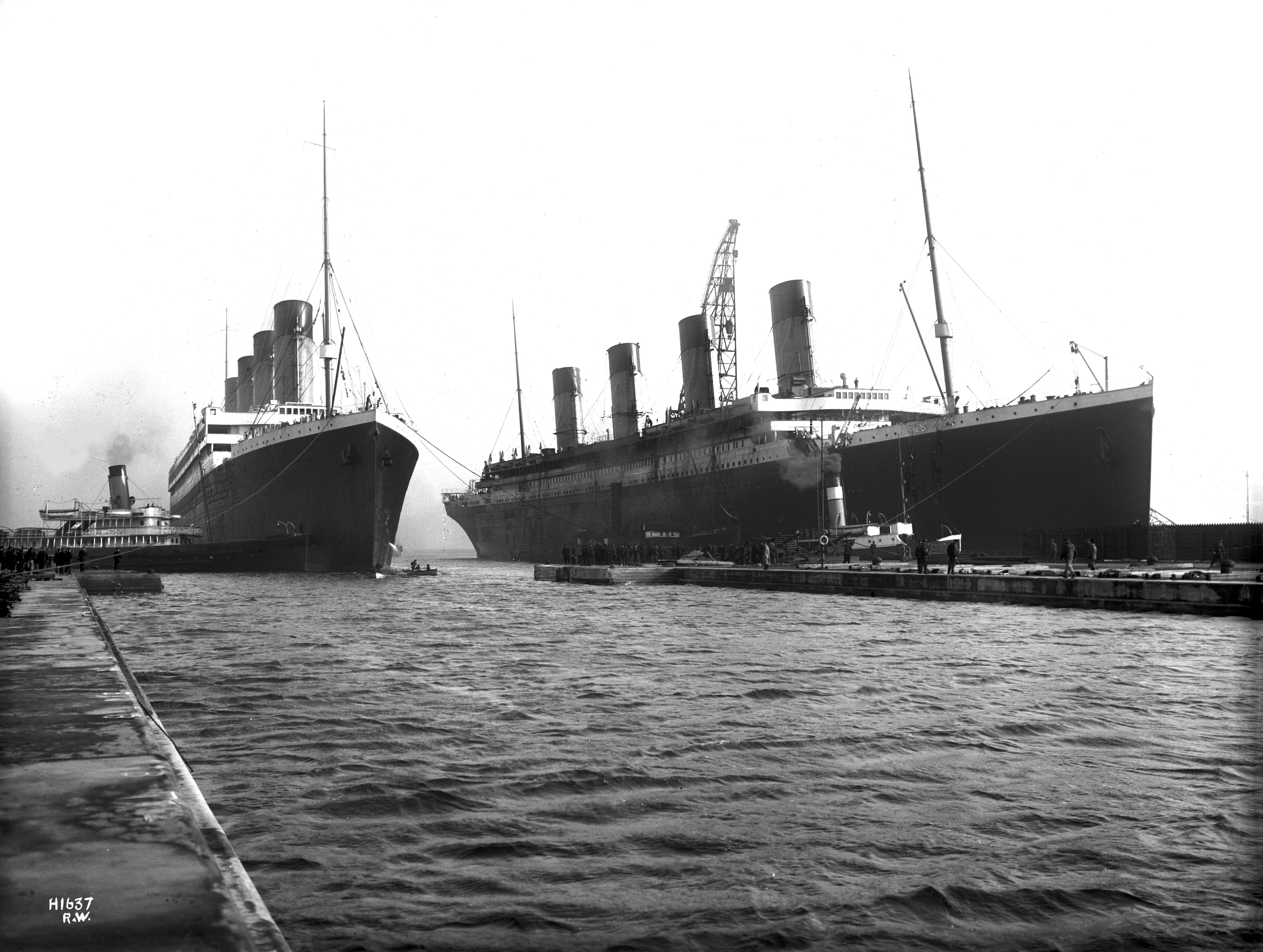
- Belfast, 6 March 1912: Titanic (right) moved out of Thompson Graving Dock to allow Olympic (left) to replace a damaged propeller blade

Class overview
- Builders: Harland and Wolff, Belfast
- Operators: White Star Line; Cunard-White Star Line
- Preceded by: Athenic class
- Built: 1908–1914
- In service: 1911–1935
- Planned: 3
- Completed: 3
- Lost: 2
- Retired: 1

General characteristics
- Type: Ocean liner
- Tonnage: 45,000 GRT - 48,000 GRT
- Displacement: 52,310 tons
- Length: 882 ft 9 in (269.1 m) overall
- Beam: 92 ft 6 in (28.19 m) (Olympic & Titanic), 94 ft (28.7 m) (Britannic)
- Height: 205 ft (62 m) from keel to top of masts
- Draught: 34 ft 7 in (10.54 m)
- Depth: 64 ft 9 in (19.74 m) from keel to side of C deck
- Decks: 9
- Installed power: 24 double-ended and 5 single-ended 15 bar Scotch marine boilers, tested to 30 bar. Two 4-cylinder reciprocating engines for the two outboard wing propellers. One low-pressure turbine for center propeller. Together 50,000 nominal horsepower, 59,000 max.
- Propulsion: Two bronze 3-blade wing propellers. One bronze 4-blade centre propeller for Olympic & Britannic. One bronze 3-blade centre propeller for Titanic
- Speed: 21 kn (39 km/h; 24 mph); 23 kn (43 km/h; 26 mph) max
- Capacity: 3,327 passengers, officers, and crew
- Crew: 892 crew members

The Olympic-class ocean liners were a trio of British ocean liners built by the Harland & Wolff shipyard for the White Star Line during the early 20th century, named RMS Olympic (1911), RMS Titanic (1912) and HMHS Britannic (1915). All three were designated to be the largest as well as most luxurious liners of the era, devised to provide White Star an advantage as regards size and luxury in the transatlantic passenger trade.

Whilst Olympic, the primary vessel, was in service for 24 years before being retired for scrap in 1935, her sisters would not witness similar success: Titanic struck an iceberg and sank on her maiden voyage and Britannic was lost whilst serving as a hospital ship during the First World War after hitting a naval mine off Kea in the Aegean Sea, less than a year after entering service and never operating as a passenger-liner.

Although two of the vessels did not achieve successful enough legacies, they are amongst the most famous ocean liners ever built; Both Olympic and Titanic enjoyed the distinction of being the largest ships in the world. Olympic was the largest British-built ship in the world for over 20 years until the commissioning of Queen Mary in 1936. Titanic's story has been adapted into many books, films, and television programs and Britannic was the inspiration of a film of the same name in 2000.

== Origin and construction ==
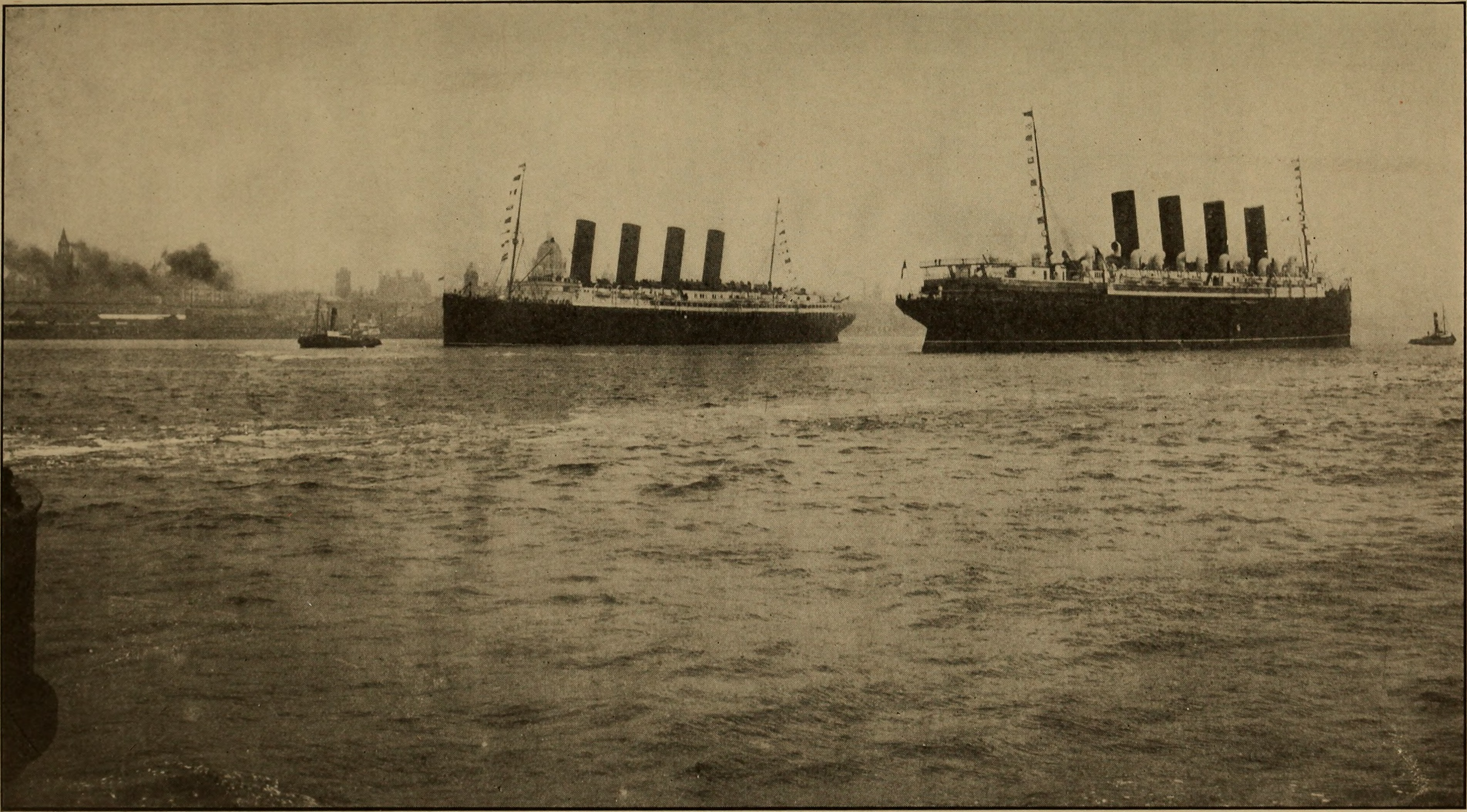
Cunard's ocean liners Lusitania and Mauretania, photographed in 1911. These ships were the largest, most luxurious and fastest ocean liners of the time. The White Star Line decided to overtake them by ordering the construction of the ships of the Olympic class

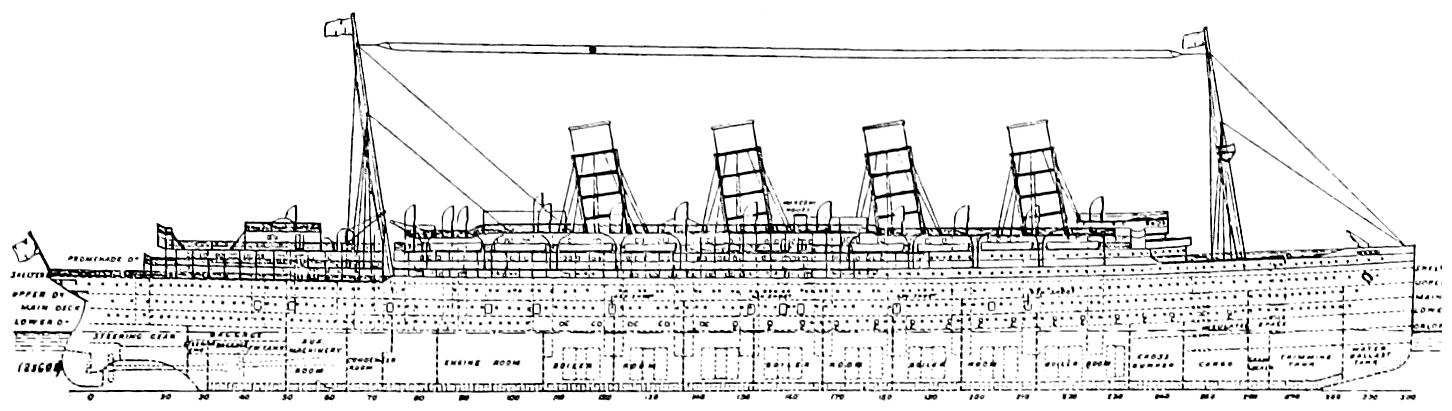
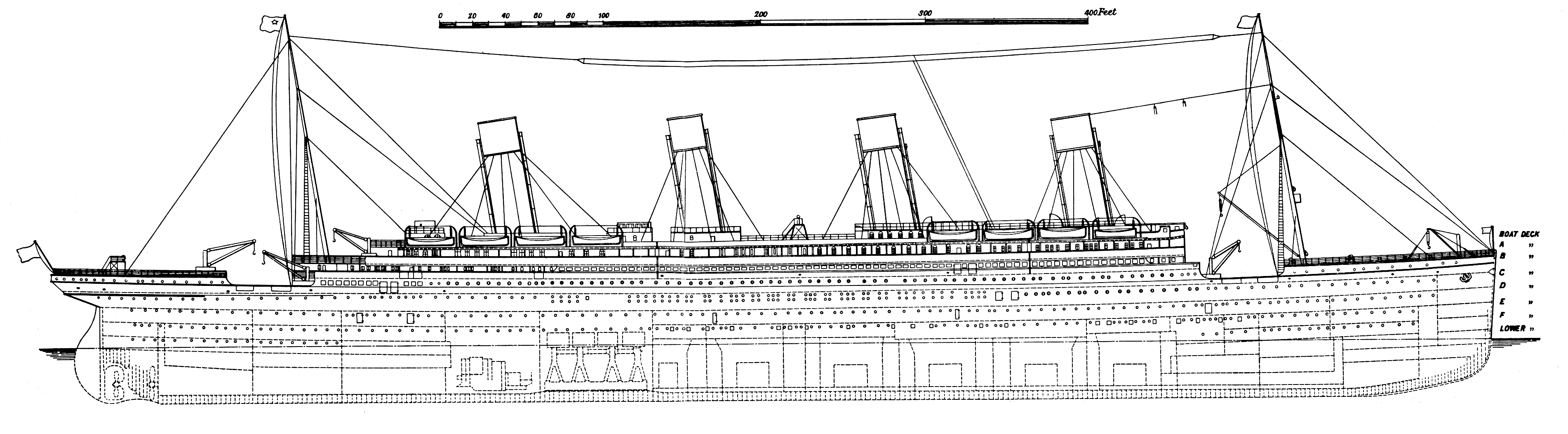
Diagrams comparing Mauretania's side plan (up) with Olympic's side plan (down)

The Olympic class had its origins in the intense competition between the United Kingdom and Germany in the construction of the liners. The Norddeutscher Lloyd and Hamburg America Line, the two largest German companies, were indeed involved in the race for speed and size in the late 19th century. The first in service for the Norddeutscher Lloyd was Kaiser Wilhelm der Grosse, which won the Blue Riband in 1897 before being beaten by HAPAG's Deutschland in 1900.

Then followed the three sister ships to Kaiser Wilhelm der Grosse: Kronprinz Wilhelm, Kaiser Wilhelm II and Kronprinzessin Cecilie all of whom were part of a "Kaiser class". In response to this, the British Cunard Line ordered two vessels whose speed earned them the nickname "greyhounds of the seas"': Lusitania and Mauretania. Mauretania held the Blue Riband for more than twenty years, from 1909 to 1929.

The White Star Line knew that their Big Four, a quartet of ships built for size and luxury, were no match for the Cunard's new liners in terms of speed. In July 1907, during a discussion at the latter's Belgravia residence regarding the nearing maiden voyage of Cunard's Lusitania two months ahead, J. Bruce Ismay, chairman of the White Star and William J. Pirrie, director of the Harland & Wolff made note of her speed. Ismay expressed concern at the record-breaking transatlantic crossing of the Lusitania with Pirrie; Despite White Star's reputation for elegance and luxury, Cunard's notability for punctuality and speed posed a threat to both of their respective firms to a great extent. Pirrie formulated the concept of a large three-stack liner constructed in order to compensate for the recent ascension of Lusitania, with an emphasis upon prestige as well as her design. Moreover, this would advance to a new class of the three largest and luxurious liners being constructed as opposed to Cunard's Mauretania and Lusitania duo, with an additional liner laid upon to forward themselves ahead of Cunard.

These were the preliminary foundations for the famous trio of liners built between 1908 until 1914. After initial groundwork drawn up by Alexander Carlisle, a veteran architect of Harland & Wolff, and Thomas Andrews, another who was Pirrie's nephew, an additional smoke stack was extended to the blueprints, a feature designated to enhance the vessels' appearance, therefore rendering the original proposition a four-stacker liner. The contract was agreed upon in a drafted agreement between White Star and Harland & Wolff a year afterwards in July 1908, facilitated as well as signatured by both Pirrie and Ismay in approval. The three vessels were designed by Andrews and Carlisle, the latter being initially the primary architect for the liners until his retirement in 1910, leaving construction under the sole supervision of Andrews, with Roderick Chisholm's assistance.

Construction of Olympic started in December 1908 and Titanic in March 1909. The two ships were built side by side. Before building of Olympic began, three entire slipways were razed to the ground in order to give way for the cradles whereupon both sisters would be laid. As a result of such density, large surroundings were in demand; 6,000t. gantries towering over 200 ft. accompanied with mobile cranes overhead were built to accommodate their keels. The construction of Britannic began in 1911 after the commissioning of Olympic and Titanic's launch. Following the sinking of Titanic, the two remaining vessels underwent many changes in their safety provisions.

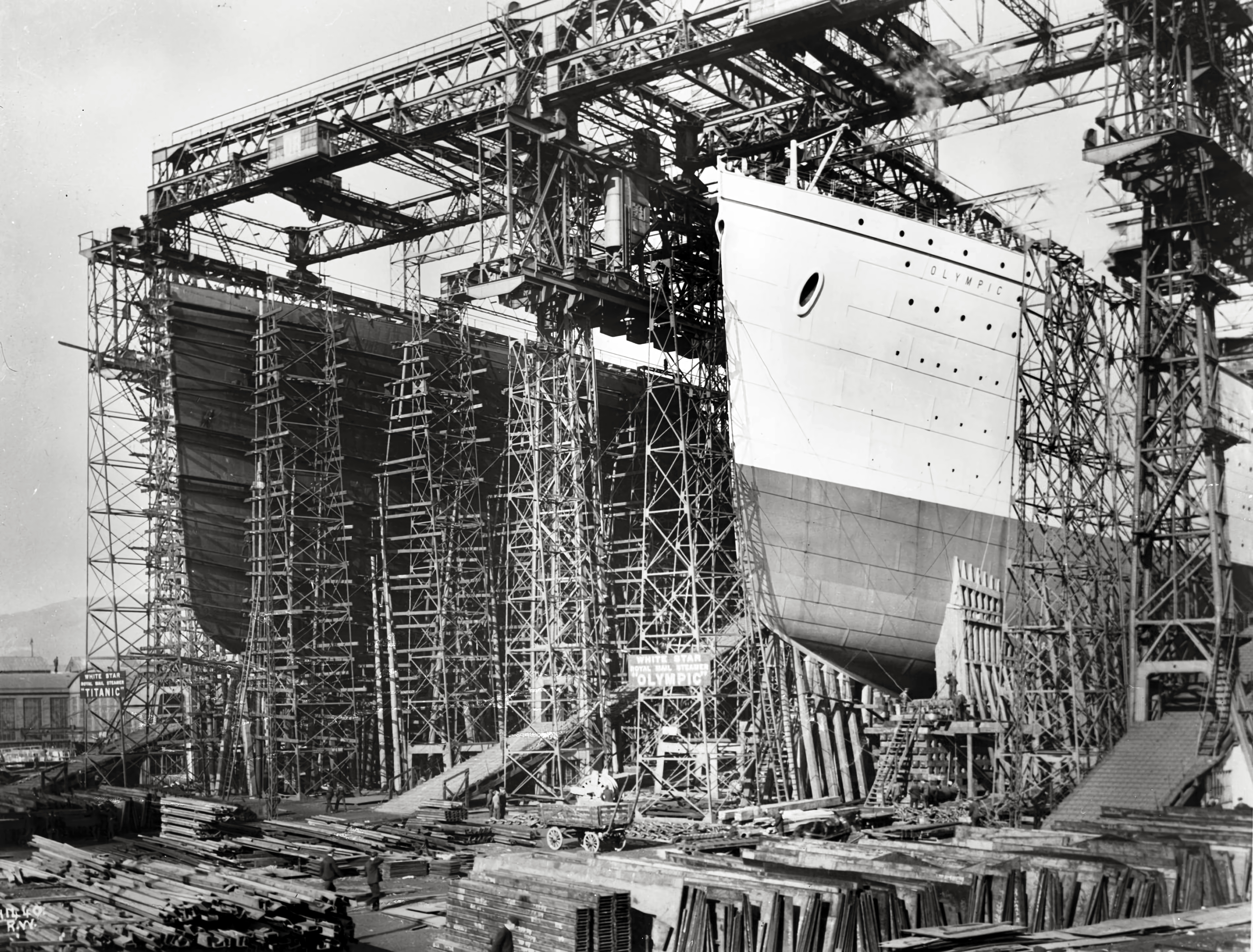
Titanic and Olympic under construction in Belfast, ca 1910

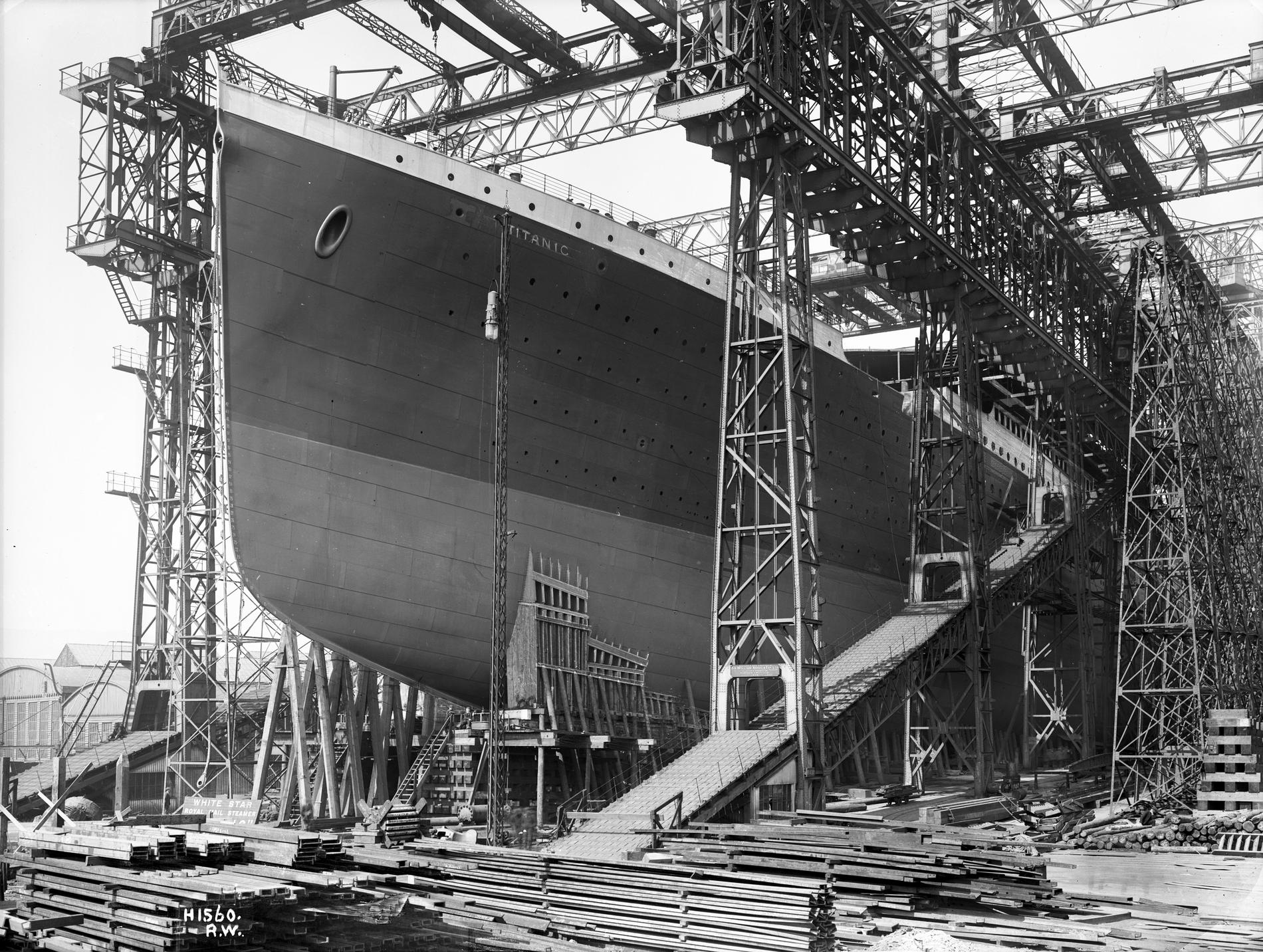
Titanic prior to launching, 31 May 1911

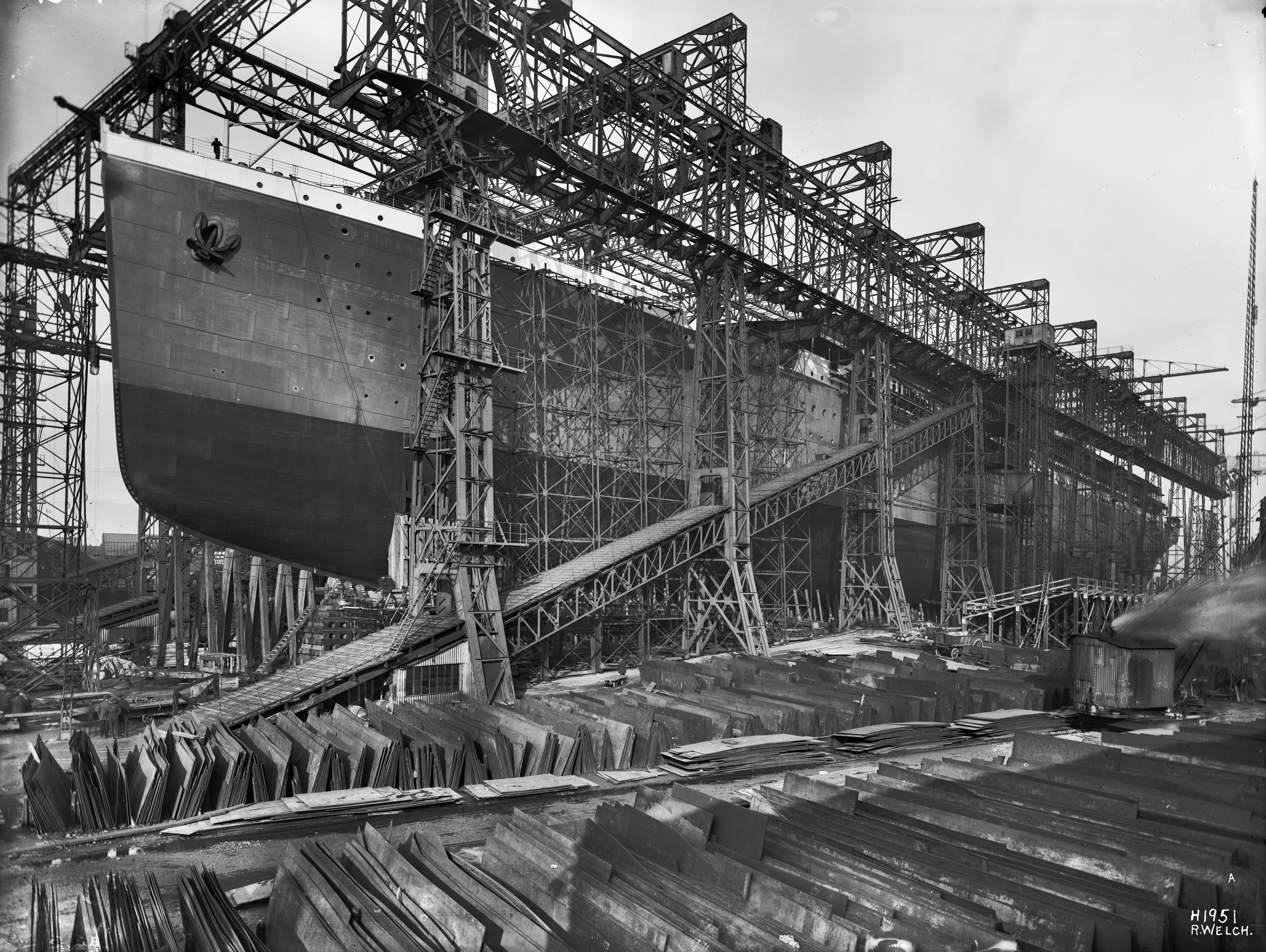
Britannic in the Arrol Gantry at Harland and Wolff, ready for launching, February 1914

Bill Hammack on the construction and service of the Olympic-class ocean liners

== Specifications ==
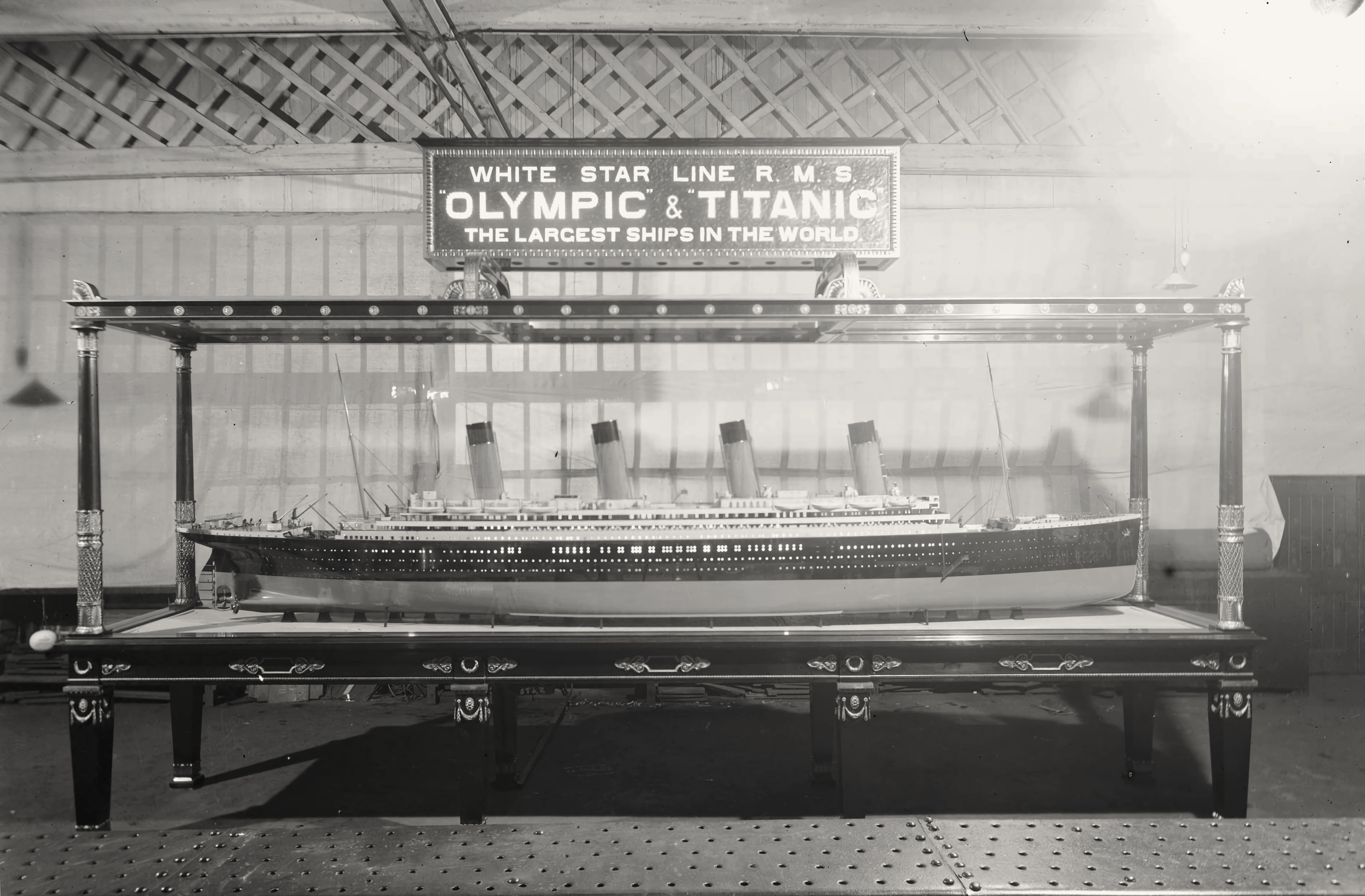
The original builder's model of Olympic and Titanic created by Harland & Wolff, photographed in 1910. It is currently on display in the Merseyside Maritime Museum

All three of the Olympic-class ships held nine decks, seven of which were for passengers. From top to bottom, the decks were:

- Boat Deck. The topmost deck of the ship, where the deck housing, lifeboats, and funnels were installed. The bridge and wheelhouse were at the forward end, in front of the captain's and officers' quarters. The bridge was flanked by two observations platforms on the Starboard and Port sides so that the ship could be manoeuvred more delicately while docking. The wheelhouse stood within the Bridge. The entrance to the First Class Grand Staircase and Gymnasium were located midships along with the raised roof of the First Class Lounge, while at the rear of the deck were the roof of the First Class smoke room, a deck house for the ship's engineers, and a relatively modest Second Class entrance. The wood-covered deck was divided into four segregated promenades: for officers, First Class passengers, engineers, and Second Class passengers respectively. Lifeboats lined the side of the deck on both sides except in the First Class area, where there was a gap so that the view would not be blocked.

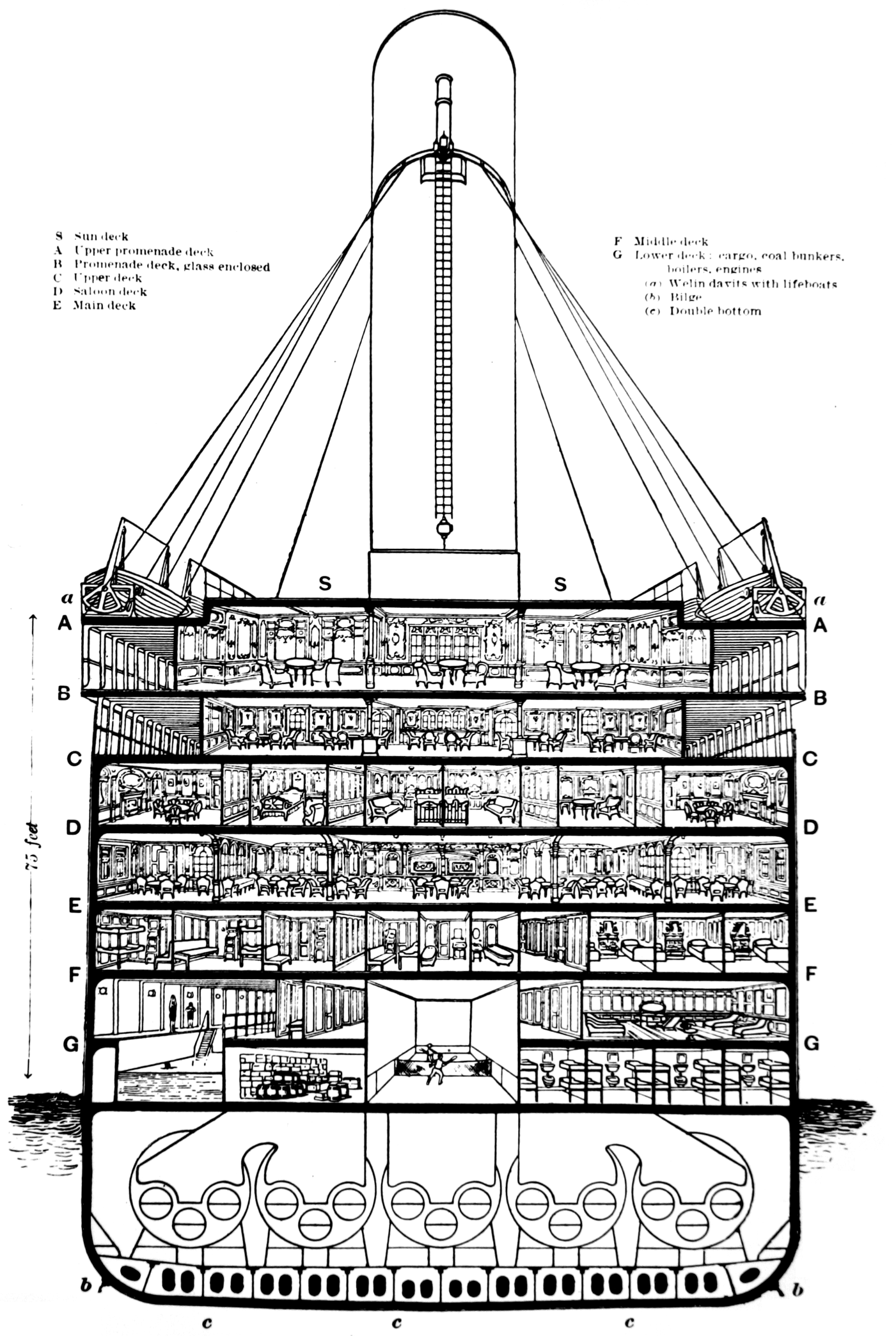
A cutaway diagram of the midship section

- A Deck, also called the Promenade Deck, ran the entire 546 feet (166 m) length of the superstructure. It was for First Class passengers only and contained First Class cabins all the way forward, the First Class lounge, Smoke Room, Reading and Writing Room and Palm Court. The promenade on Olympic was unenclosed along its whole length, whereas on Titanic and Britannic, the forward half was enclosed by a steel screen with sliding windows.
- B Deck, also known as the Bridge Deck, was almost entirely devoted to First-Class staterooms. The finest suites could be found on this deck, particularly the two "Deluxe" Parlour Suites with their own private 50 ft (15 m) long promenades. All three ships had À la Carte Restaurants positioned aft on B-Deck, as well as the Second-Class Smoking Rooms and Entrances. Olympic was built with an encircling First-Class promenade which soon proved to be redundant given the ample promenade space on A-Deck. Titanic added enlarged additional staterooms to occupy the space and a Café Parisien built as an annex to an enlarged Restaurant. This arrangement proved so popular that Olympic would adopt the same additions during its 1913 refit. On the exterior of each ship, B-Deck is defined by rectangular sliding windows.
- C Deck, the Shelter Deck, was the uppermost deck to run uninterrupted from the ships' bow to stern. It included the two well decks, both of which served as the Third Class promenade spaces. Each well deck also contained large cranes for loading cargo into the interior holds. Crew cabins were located under the forecastle and Third Class public rooms were situated under the Poop Deck. The superstructure of C Deck between the bow and stern contained mostly First Class accommodation, but the Second Class Library was also placed further aft, directly below the Second Class Smoking Room.

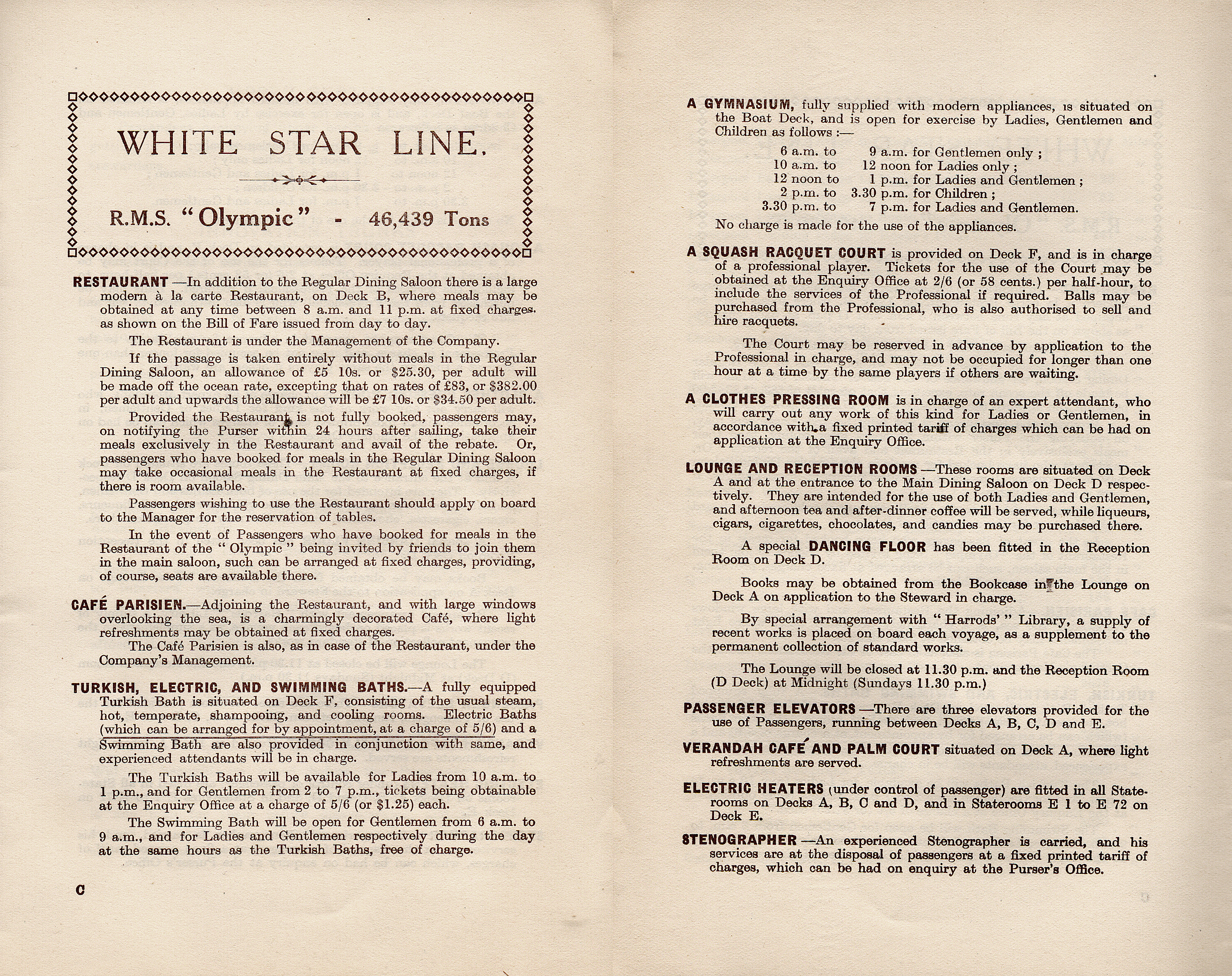
List of passenger facilities from RMS Olympic's First Class passenger list, 1923

- D Deck, the Saloon Deck, was dominated by three large public rooms – the First Class Reception Room, the First Class Dining Saloon and the Second Class Dining Saloon. An open space was provided for Third Class passengers underneath in the bow. Second Class and Third Class passengers had cabins on this deck, with berths for firemen located in the bow. It was originally the highest deck reached by the ships' watertight bulkheads (though only by eight of the fifteen bulkheads). This was later changed in the Olympic in a 1913 refit following the loss of Titanic. Britannic was designed with bulkheads extending to the main deck.
- E Deck, the Upper Deck, was predominantly a passenger accommodation for all three classes as well as berths for cooks, seamen, stewards and trimmers. There was also Third-Class cabins with a long passageway nicknamed Scotland Road by the crew, in reference to a famous street in Liverpool.
- F Deck, the Middle Deck, was the last complete deck and predominantly accommodated Third Class passengers. There were also some Second and Third Class cabins and crew accommodation. The Third Class dining saloon was located here, as were the swimming pool and the Victorian-style Turkish baths, the only section for First-Class passengers.
- G Deck, the Lower Deck, was the lowest complete deck to accommodate passengers, and had the lowest portholes, protruding above the waterline. The squash court was located here along with the travelling post office where mail clerks sorted letters and parcels so that they would be ready for delivery when the ship docked. Food was also stored here. The deck was interrupted at several points by orlop (partial) decks over the boiler, engine and turbine rooms.
- The Orlop decks and the Tank Top were at the lowest level of the ship, below the waterline. The orlop decks were used as cargo space, while the Tank Top – the inner bottom of the ship's hull – provided the platform on which the ship's boilers, engines, turbines and electrical generators were housed. This part of the ship was dominated by the engine and boiler rooms, areas which were generally never seen by passengers. They were connected with higher levels of the ship by flights of stairs; twin spiral stairways near the bow gave access up to D Deck.

Propulsion was achieved through three propellers: two outboard or wing propellers had three blades, while the central propeller had four on the Olympic and Britannic. The Titanic was fitted with a three bladed central propeller to test efficiency against the four bladed central propeller of its older sister, Olympic. The two lateral propellers were powered by reciprocating steam triple expansion, while the central shaft was driven by a steam turbine. All power on board was derived from a total of 29 coal-fired steam boilers in six compartments. However, Olympic's boilers were converted to firing by oil at the end of the First World War, which reduced the number of engine crew required from 350 to 60.

The Olympic-class ships were 269.13 metres (883.0 ft) long, displacing 52,310 long tons (53,150 t) normally (their draft at this displacement being 34 ft 7 in or 10.5 m), and their tonnage was around 45–46,000 GRT. Olympic became the largest ship in the world when it was completed in May, 1911 before losing the title to its sister Titanic when she was completed in April, 1912. After the loss of Titanic, the third ship Britannic claimed the title of largest British-built ship, until her own sinking in November 1916. After this Olympic held the title for 20 years until the commissioning of RMS Queen Mary in 1936.

All three vessels had four funnels, with the fourth being a dummy which was used for ventilation and aesthetic purposes. Smoke from the galleys and Smoking Room fireplaces and fumes from the engine rooms was exhausted through a chimney up the forward portion of this funnel. While it was a decoration to establish a symmetry in the ships' profile, it acted as a huge ventilation shaft, replacing a large amount of ventilation cowls on deck, as on Cunard's Lusitania and Mauretania.

== Safety features ==
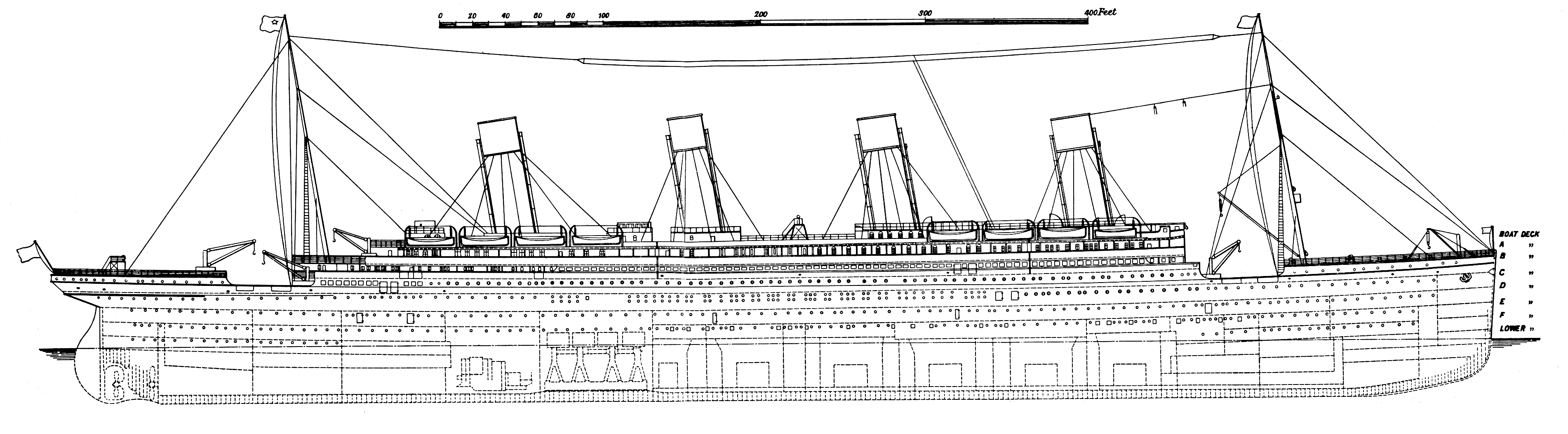
Olympic and Titanic's side plan

The triad implemented modern developments in safety measures within their designs, intended to mitigate the risk of flooding and all but eliminate the likelihood of foundering. Each ship featured an inner skin, a second layer of 1.25 in (31.8 mm) thick steel above the keel, which established a watertight box along the bottom of the hull known as a "double bottom." 15 transverse steel bulkheads advancing 45 ft (13.7 m) towards E Deck (D Deck in the event of the two forward most bulkheads) divided the hulls of each ship into 16 watertight compartments, each equipped with electric pumping to remove floodwater. The compartments would be sealed by automatic doors from the bridge in a theoretical collision, thus isolating the water from other holds; Should the bridge switch fail, stokers and engineers were enabled to seal off the doors manually via a lever underneath. Therefore, these designations ensured Olympic and Titanic remaining afloat with four compartments breached. The Olympic-class liners also eliminated longitudinal bulkheads, such as those on Lusitania and Mauretania, which separated the coal bunkers along either side of the hull from the engine rooms and boiler rooms in the centre. Such an arrangement was believed to increase the risk of a ship capsizing by trapping water lengthwise along the ship and increasing her list.

The sinking of Titanic led to Harland & Wolff as well as White Star determining upon refitting the liners following a revision, thereby requiring major safety enhancements for Olympic during late 1912 along with major design reforms within Britannic, having had her keel laid down months beforehand. Six forward compartments amongst the sixteen bulkheads of Titanic were breached, above the keel albeit below the waterline, bypassing the double-bottom entirely. The low height of the bulkheads also failed the ship, granting leeway for unpreventable flooding after water within the breached compartments reached E Deck. The refit on Olympic raised the middle five bulkheads to B Deck, the others to D Deck and also oversaw an extension of the double-bottom along the hull up to G Deck. These improvements were designed in Britannic, along with two additional bulkheads. These reforms translated into both Olympic and Britannic surviving the scenario leading to their middle sister to founder. The three ships were fitted with brass three-chime triple-chambered steam whistles amongst all four stacks. Only the whistles on the first and second of these functioned however, given that those on the third and fourth were decorations fitted for aesthetic reasons holding neither valves nor bellows.

== Lifeboats ==
Each ship could accommodate a maximum of 64 lifeboats. However, only 20 boats were installed on Olympic and Titanic during construction as Board of Trade regulations did not require them to carry more than 16. Shipbuilders of the era envisaged the ocean liner itself as the ultimate lifeboat and therefore imagined that a lifeboat's purpose was that of a ferry between a foundering liner and a rescue ship. Despite the low number of lifeboats, both Olympic and Titanic exceeded Board of Trade regulations of the time. Following the sinking of Titanic, more lifeboats were added to Olympic. Britannic, meanwhile, was equipped with eight huge gantry davits, six along the Boat Deck and two on the Poop Deck at the stern. Each contained six lifeboats and were individually powered by electric motors with their own night time illumination. In the event that the ship should develop a list and make the lowering of lifeboats impossible along one side, the davits could be manoeuvred to pick up lifeboats from the other side of the deck.

== Interiors ==
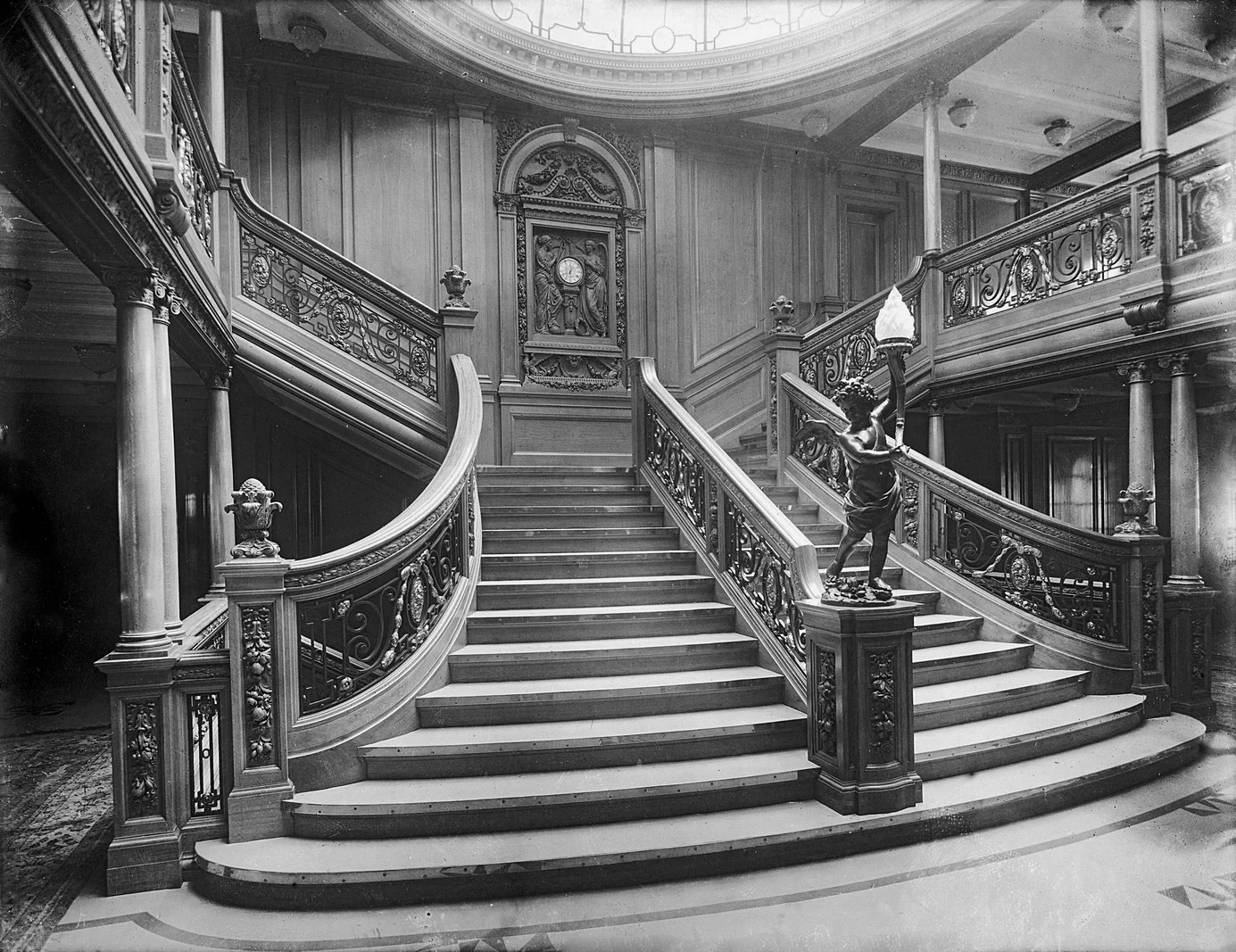
The Grand Staircase aboard Olympic

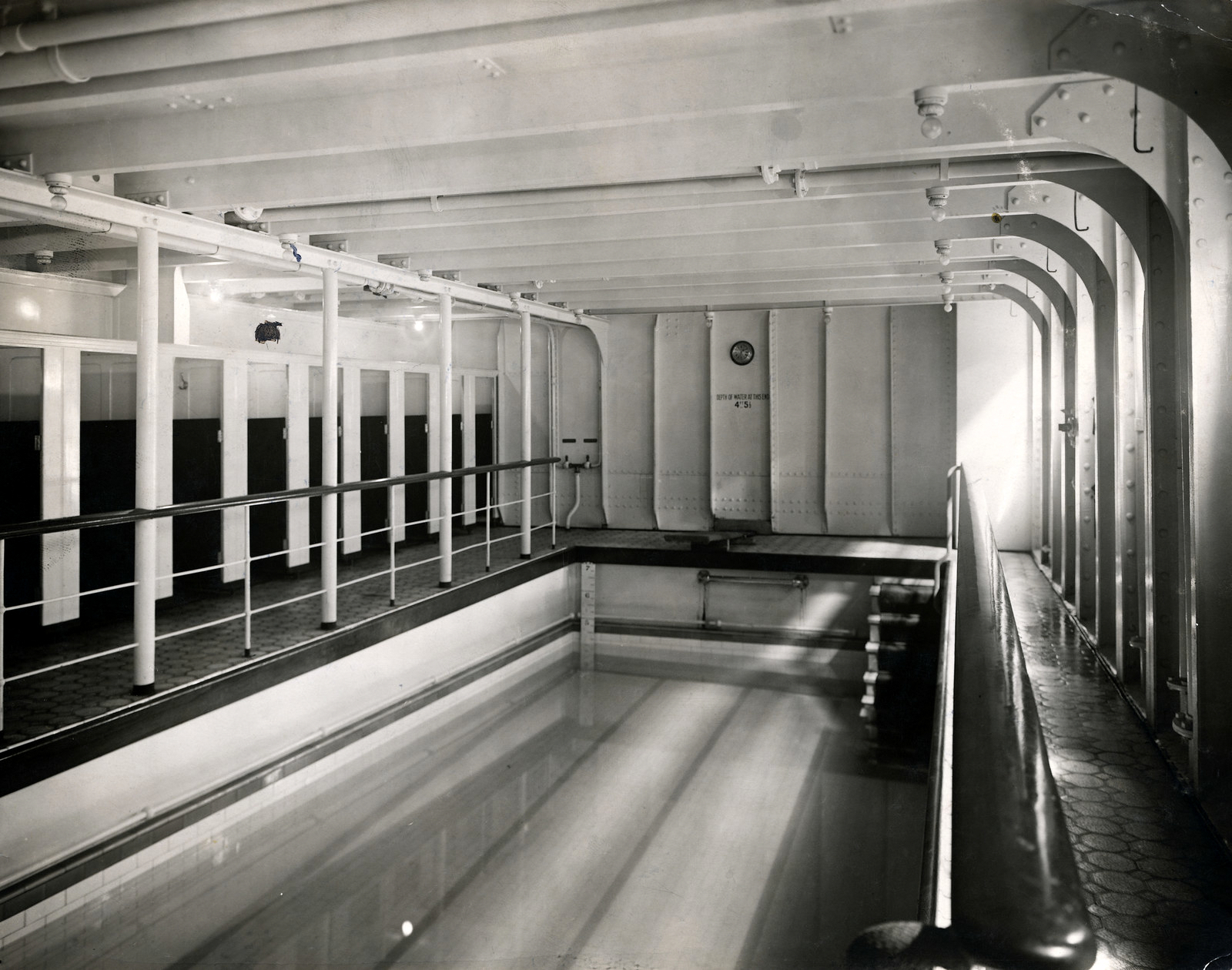
Olympic's first class swimming pool

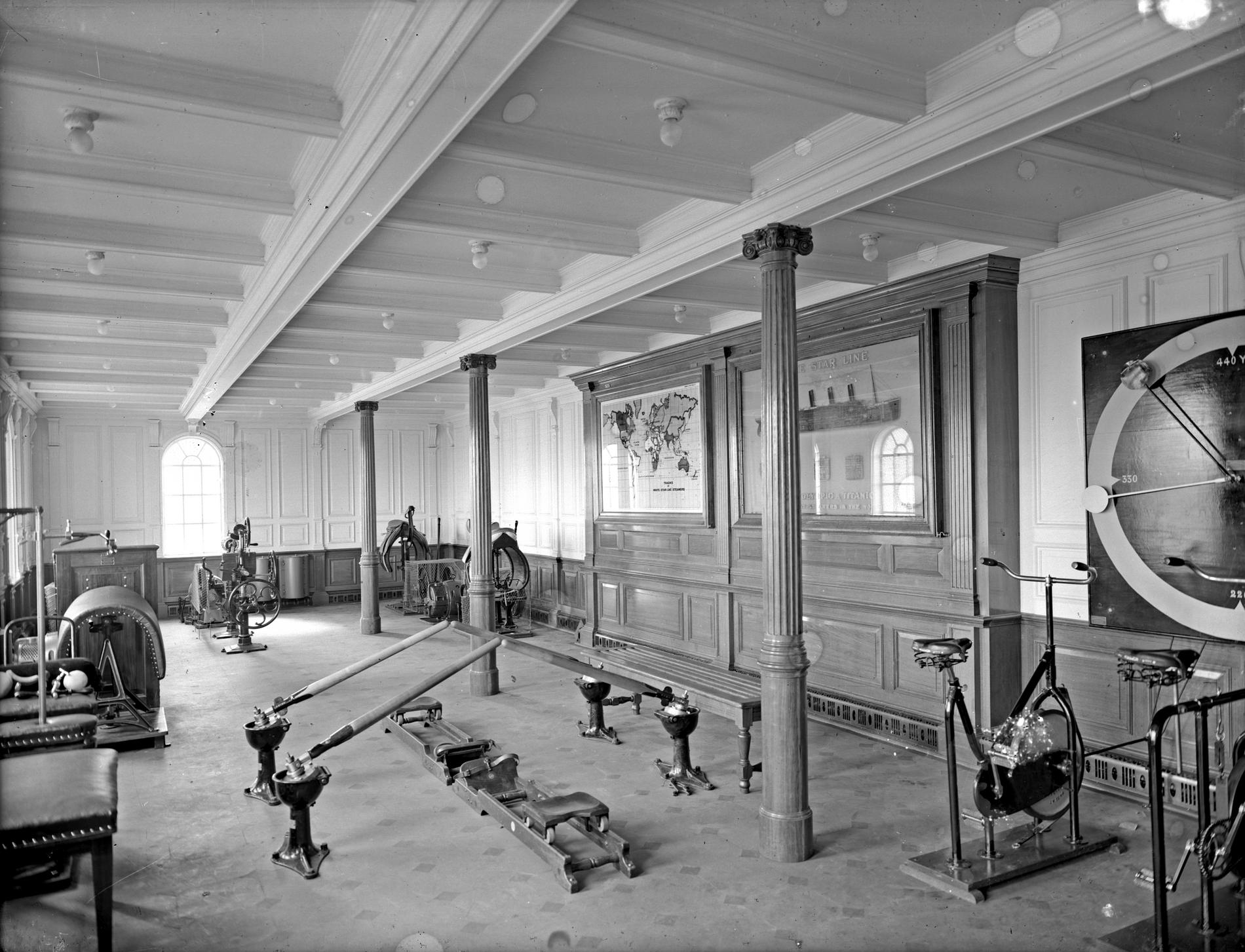
The gymnasium on board Titanic

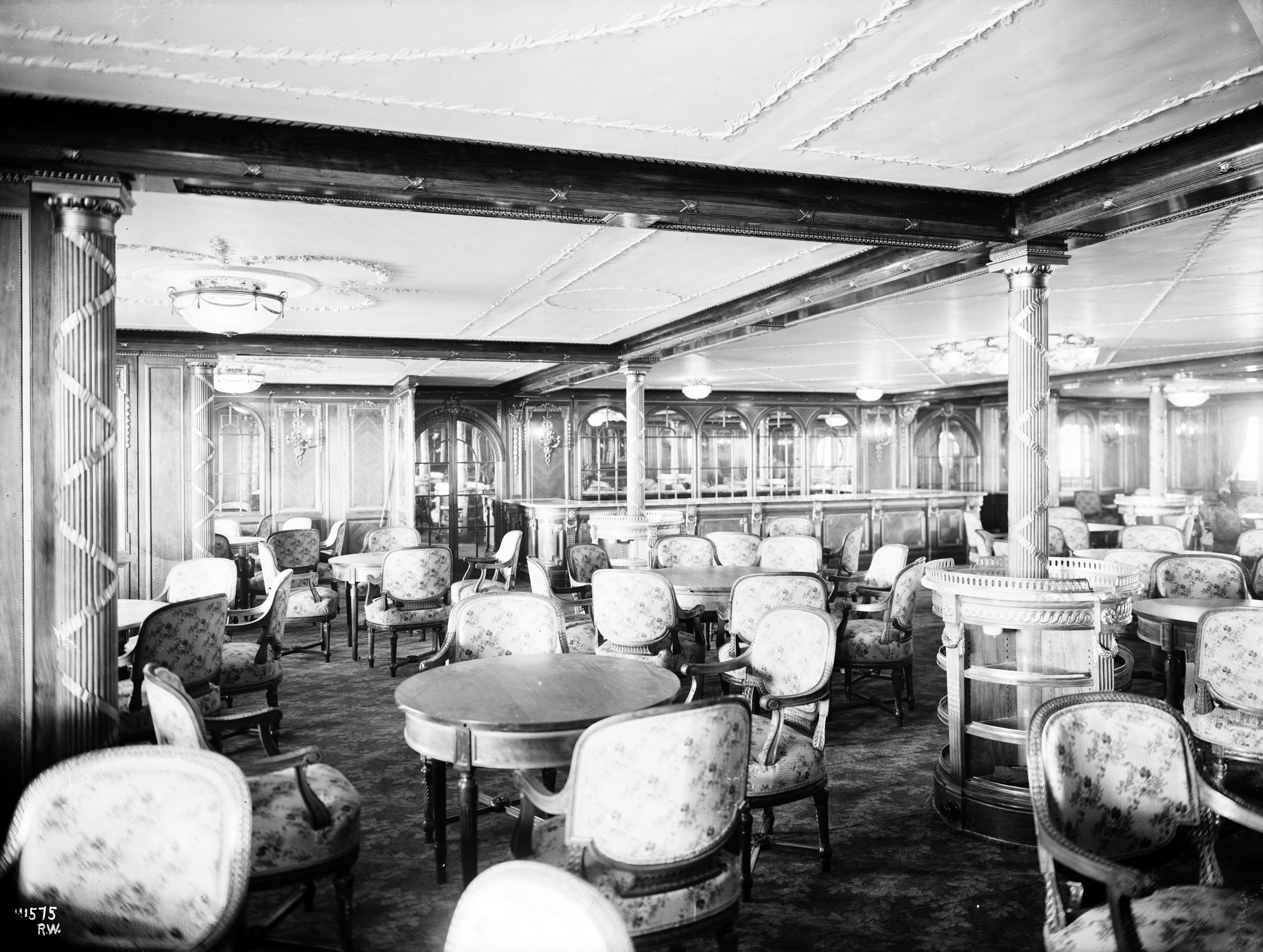
Photograph of the Olympic's À La Carte restaurant, taken in 1911

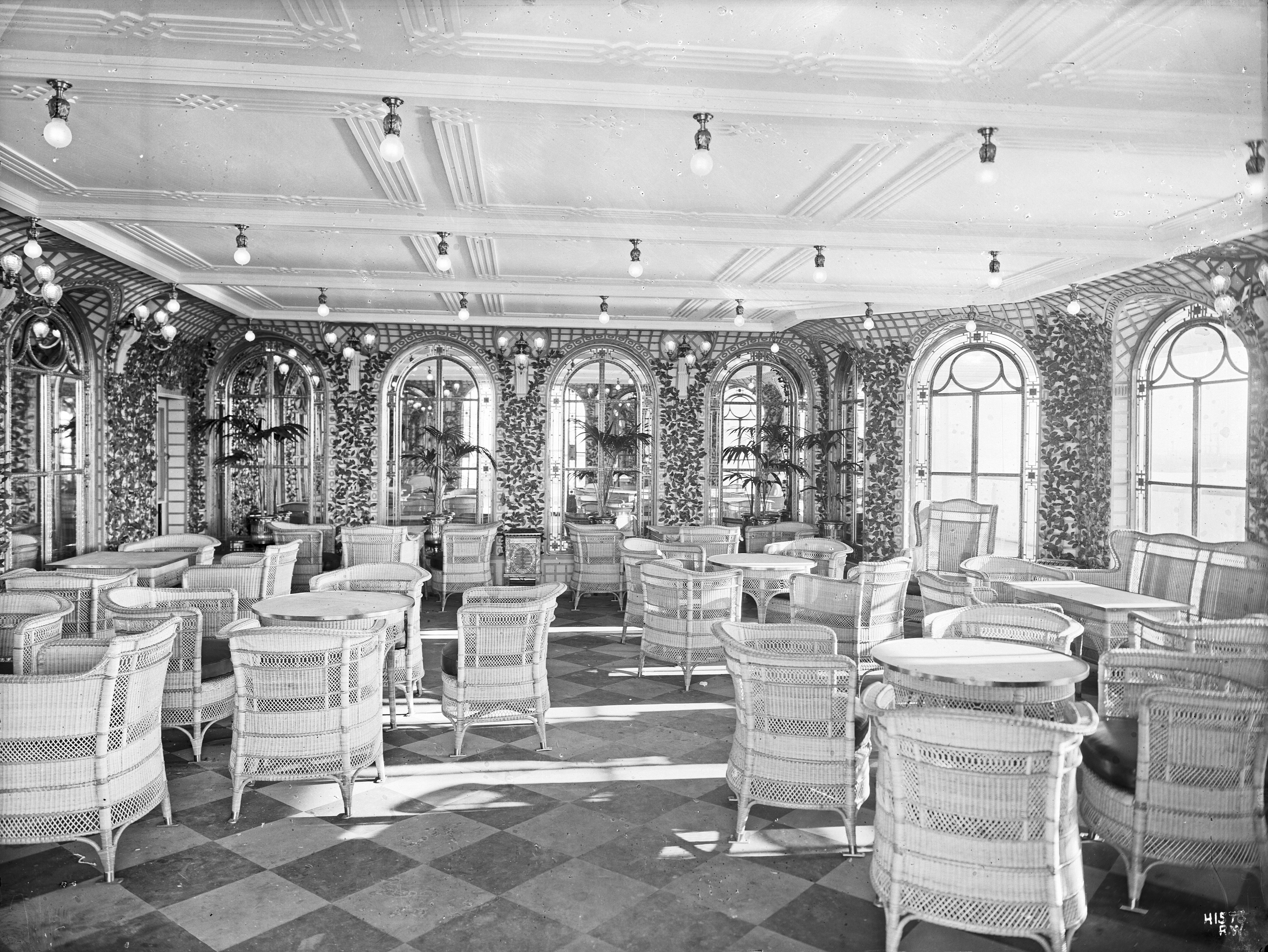
Olympic's starboard Verandah Café

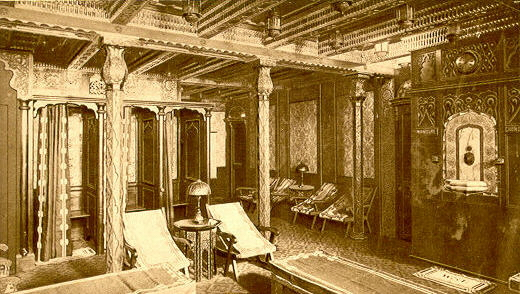
Olympic's Turkish bath cooling-room

The three vessels had a total of 8 levels of passenger accommodation, with slight variations between the ships. However, no class was neglected. The first class passengers enjoyed luxurious cabins, many of which were equipped with private bathrooms, a novelty at the time. The two most luxurious suites included a private promenade deck, sitting room, two walk-in wardrobes, two bedrooms, a private bath, and lavatory. (Note: This last provision was a novelty on board Titanic.) Each class had its own large dining saloon, while first class also featured a lavish Grand Staircase descending in seven levels through the ship,(a second smaller grand staircase which only transcended down three decks.) a Georgian-style smoking room, a Veranda Cafe decorated with palm trees, a swimming pool, Turkish bath, gymnasium, and several other places for meals and entertainment. The Olympic-class liners were the first British ships to contain separate restaurants independent of the dining saloons. These were in imitation of the precedent set on the German Hamburg-America liner Amerika (1905), which had included a restaurant serving French haute cuisine run by the famous hotelier César Ritz. Olympic and Titanic had À la Carte restaurant aft on B-Deck managed by the London restaurateur Luigi Gatti and his staff, all of whom died in the sinking of Titanic.

The second class also included a smoking room, a library, a spacious dining room, and an elevator. Britannic's second class also featured a gymnasium.

Finally, the third-class passengers enjoyed reasonable accommodation compared to other ships. Instead of large dormitories offered by most ships of the time, the third-class passengers of the Olympic class lived in cabins containing two to ten bunks. The class also had a smoking room, a common area, and a dining room. Britannic was planned to provide the third-class passengers with more comfort than its two sister ships.

== Careers ==
Name	Builder	Ordered	Laid down	Launched	Commissioned	Fate
Olympic	Harland & Wolff, Belfast	1907	16 December 1908	20 October 1910	14 June 1911	Scrapped 1935–1937
Titanic	Harland & Wolff, Belfast	17 September 1908	31 March 1909	31 May 1911	10 April 1912	Sunk following iceberg strike, 15 April 1912
Britannic	Harland & Wolff, Belfast	1911	30 November 1911	26 February 1914	23 December 1915	Sunk following mine strike off Kea, 21 November 1916

1: For ships in passenger service, "commissioned" is taken to mean the date of departure on maiden passenger voyage

=== Olympic ===
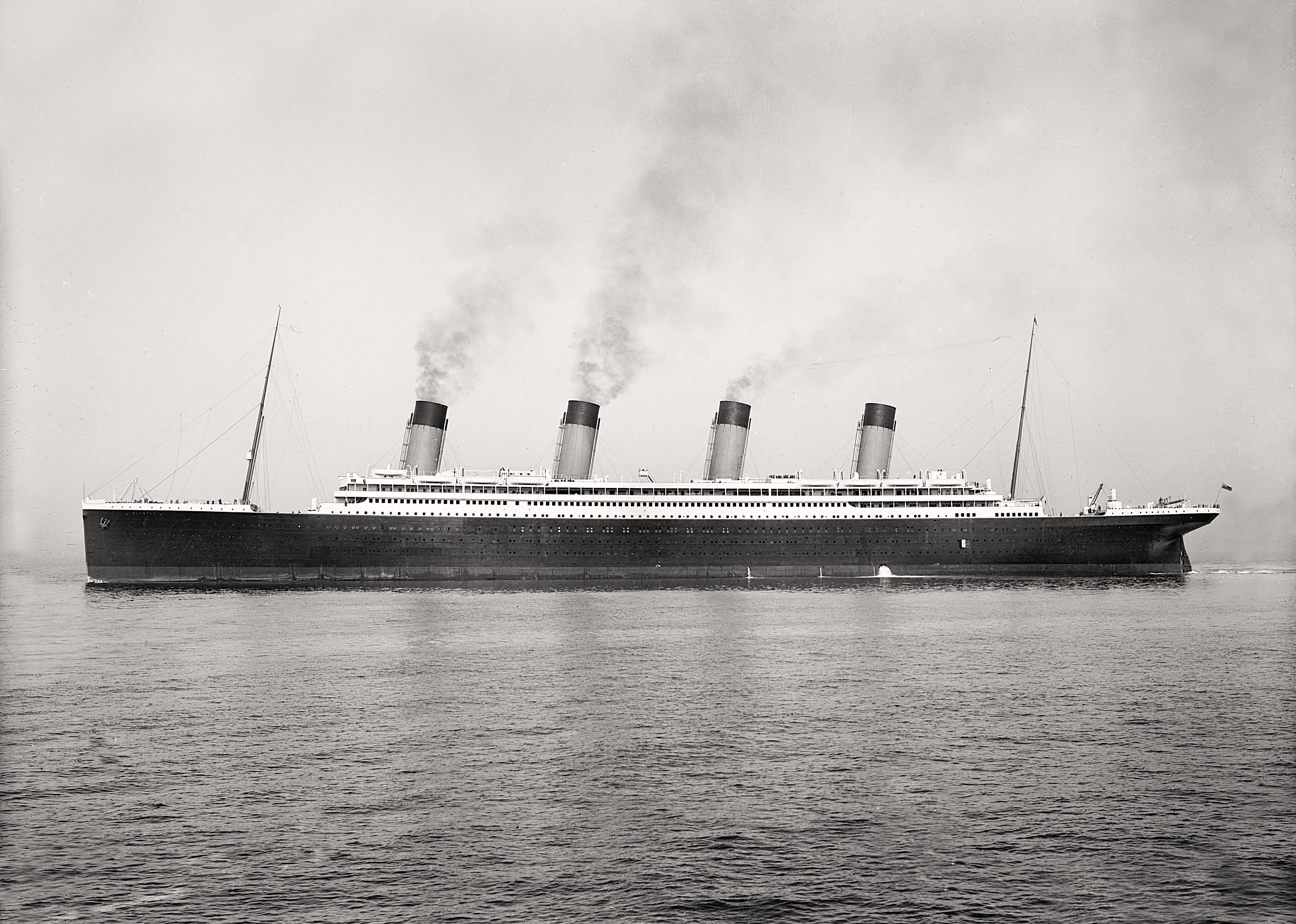
RMS Olympic during her sea trials

First of the Olympic-class liners, Olympic was launched on 20 October 1910 and commissioned on 14 June 1911. She made her maiden voyage on 14 June 1911, under the command of Captain Edward J. Smith. On 20 September of the same year, while under the command of a harbour pilot she was involved in a collision with the cruiser HMS Hawke in the port of Southampton, leading to her repair back at Harland and Wolff and delaying the completion of Titanic. When her sister sank, Olympic was on her way across the Atlantic, in the opposite direction. She was able to receive a distress call from Titanic but she was too far away to reach her before she sank. After the sinking of Titanic, Olympic was returned to Thompson Graving Dock in October 1912, where she underwent a number of alterations to improve her safety before resuming commercial service.

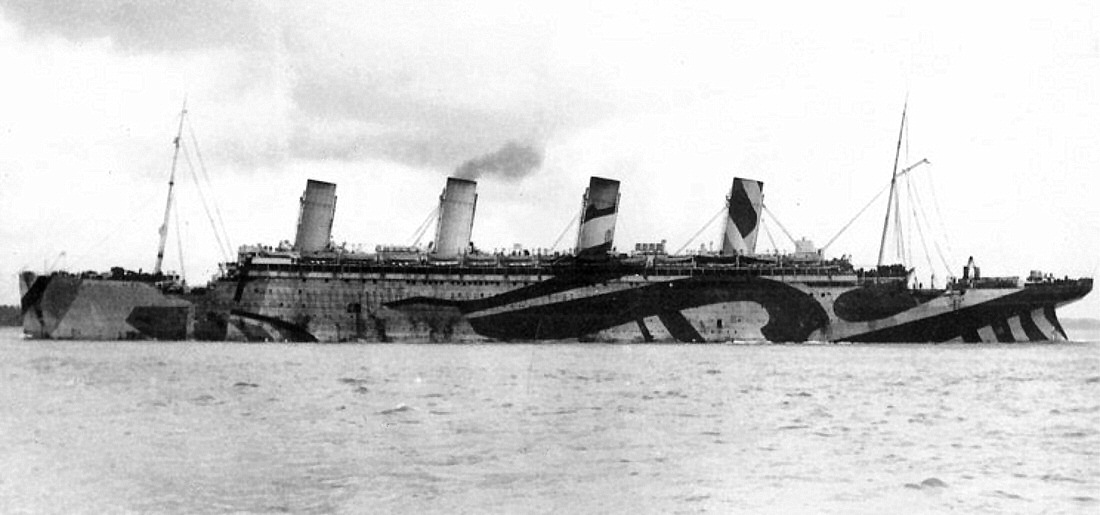
HMT Olympic in dazzle camouflage during World War I

During the First World War, the ship served as a troop transport. On 12 May 1918, she rammed and sank the German submarine U-103. Once she was returned to commercial service in 1920, she crossed the Atlantic as one of a trio of grand White Star liners. The other two were seized as war reparations from Germany –the HAPAG's unfinished Bismarck which was renamed Majestic, and NDL's Columbus which became Homeric. During the 1920s Olympic would enjoy great popularity on the transatlantic route, earning the nickname "The Ship Magnificent". She often carried famous celebrities of the day, included the actor Charlie Chaplin and the then Edward, Prince of Wales. In 1934 she inadvertently collided with and sank Nantucket Lightship LV-117, leading to the death of seven of the lightship's eleven crewmembers.

Despite a major refit later in her career, Olympic was outdated compared to newer ships. Following the merger of the White Star Line and Cunard Line in 1934, in April 1935 due to the excess tonnage within the new combined fleet of ships Olympic was withdrawn, sold for breaking and towed to Jarrow for scrapping.

=== Titanic ===
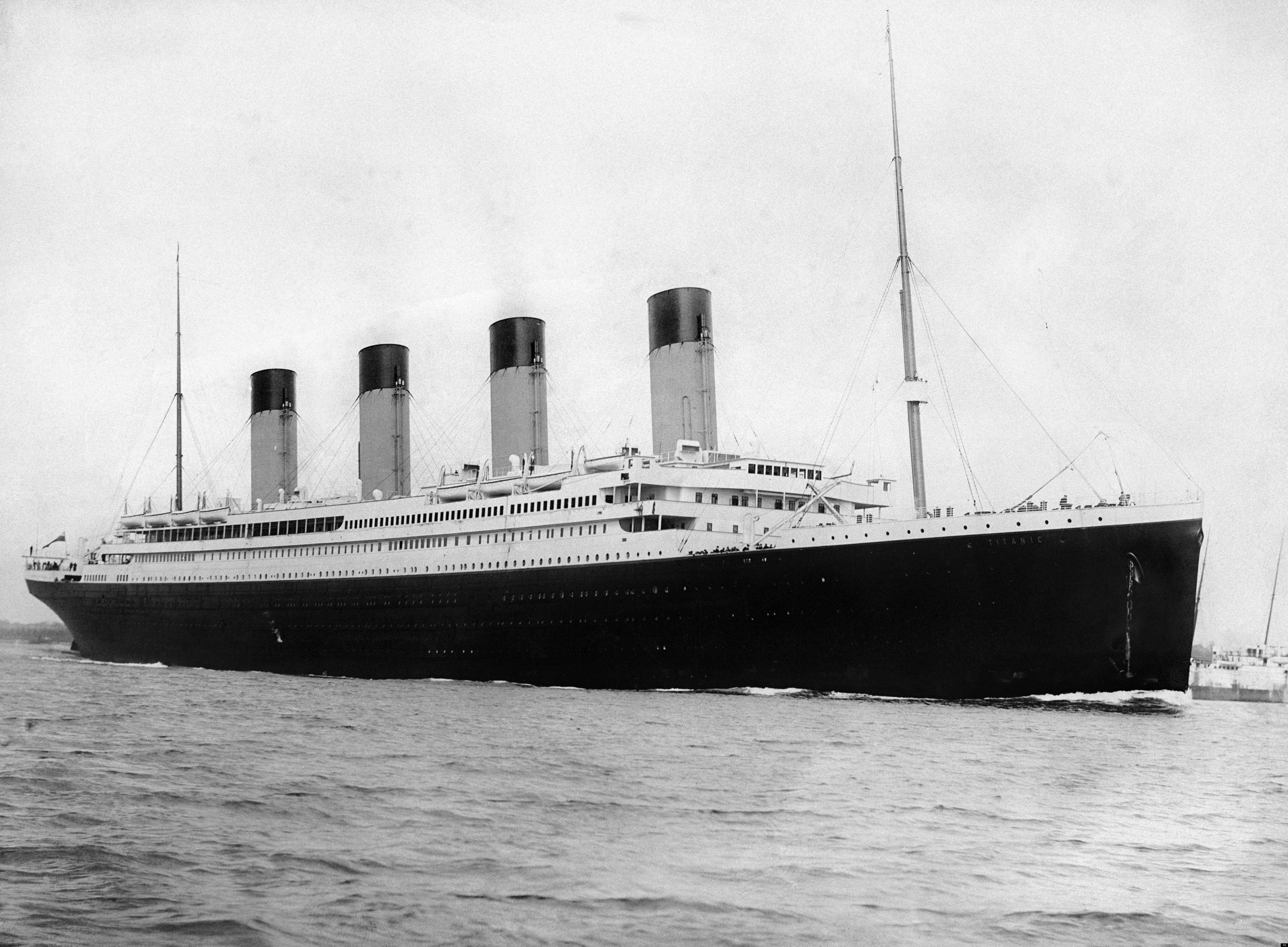
RMS Titanic departing Southampton on 10 April 1912

Second in line of the Olympic class, Titanic was launched on 31 May 1911, and her commissioning was slightly delayed due to ongoing repairs of Olympic. The ship left the port of Southampton 10 April 1912 for her maiden voyage, narrowly avoiding a collision with SS New York, a ship moored in the port pulled by the propellers of Titanic. After a stopover at Cherbourg, France and another in Queenstown, Ireland, she sailed into the Atlantic with 2,200 passengers and crew on board, under the command of Captain Edward J. Smith headed for New York City. The crossing took place without major incident until 14 April at 23:40.

Titanic struck an iceberg at 41°46′N 50°14′W while sailing about 400 miles (640 km) south of the Grand Banks of Newfoundland at 11:40 pm ships time. The strike and the resulting shock sheared the rivets, which opened several tears in the hull below the waterline. This caused the first five compartments to be flooded with water with flooding in a sixth compartment controlled by the pumps; the ship was only designed to stay afloat with a maximum of four compartments flooded. Titanic sank 2 hours and 40 minutes after the collision. There were not enough lifeboats for all the passengers and the nearest responding ship RMS Carpathia, being too far away, 1,514 of the 2,224 people on board died, making it one of the deadliest peacetime maritime disasters in history.

=== Britannic ===
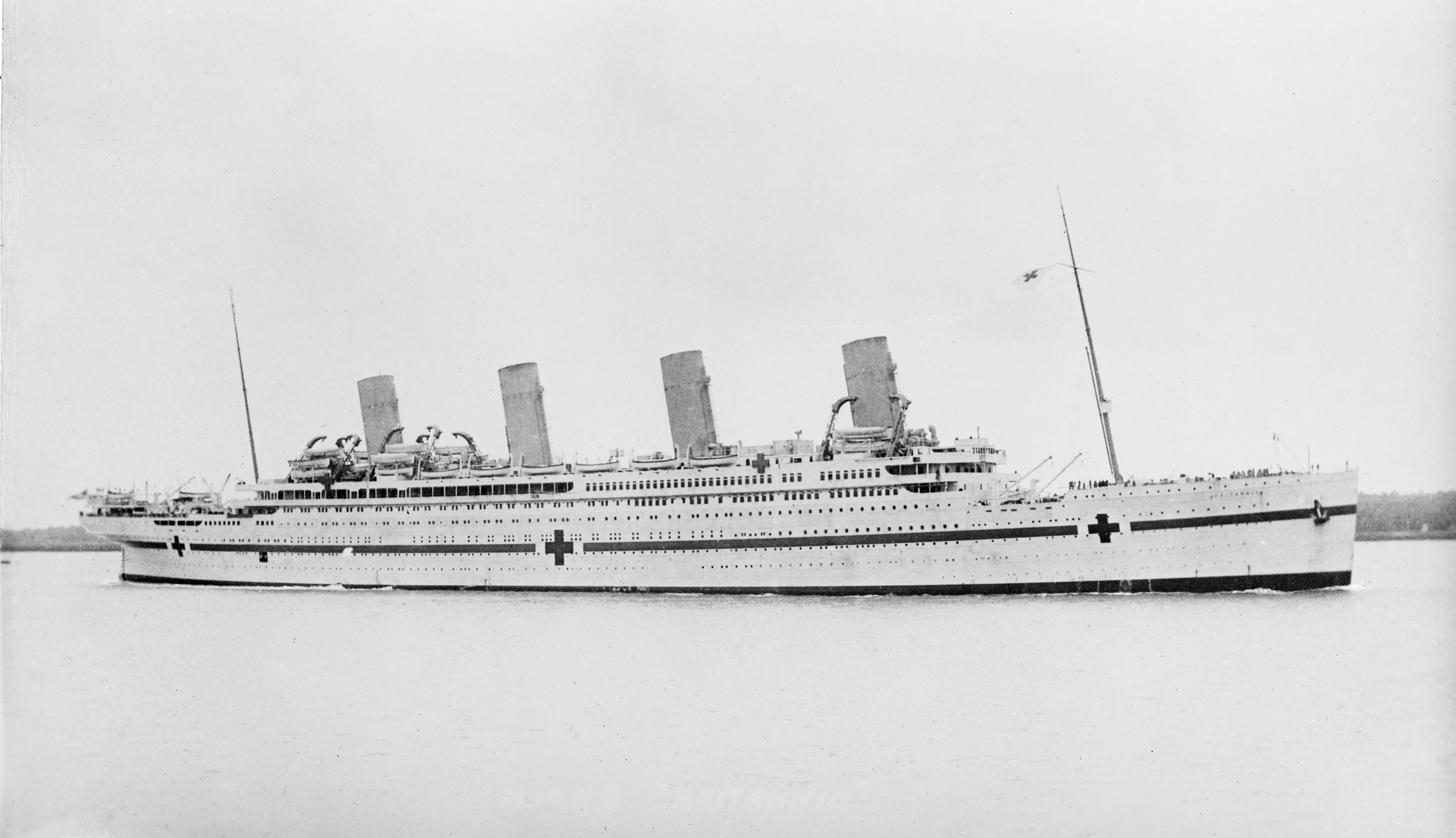
HMHS Britannic as a hospital ship

The third of the Olympic-class trio, Britannic was ordered in 1911 and launched on 26 February 1914 at the Harland and Wolff shipyard in Belfast and fitting out began. In August 1914, before Britannic could commence transatlantic service between New York and Southampton, World War I began. Immediately, all shipyards with Admiralty contracts were given top priority to use available raw materials. All civil contracts, including Britannic fitting out were slowed down.

On 13 November 1915, Britannic was requisitioned as a hospital ship from her storage location at Belfast. Repainted white and from bow to stern with large red crosses and a horizontal green stripe, she was renamed HMHS (His Majesty's Hospital Ship) Britannic.

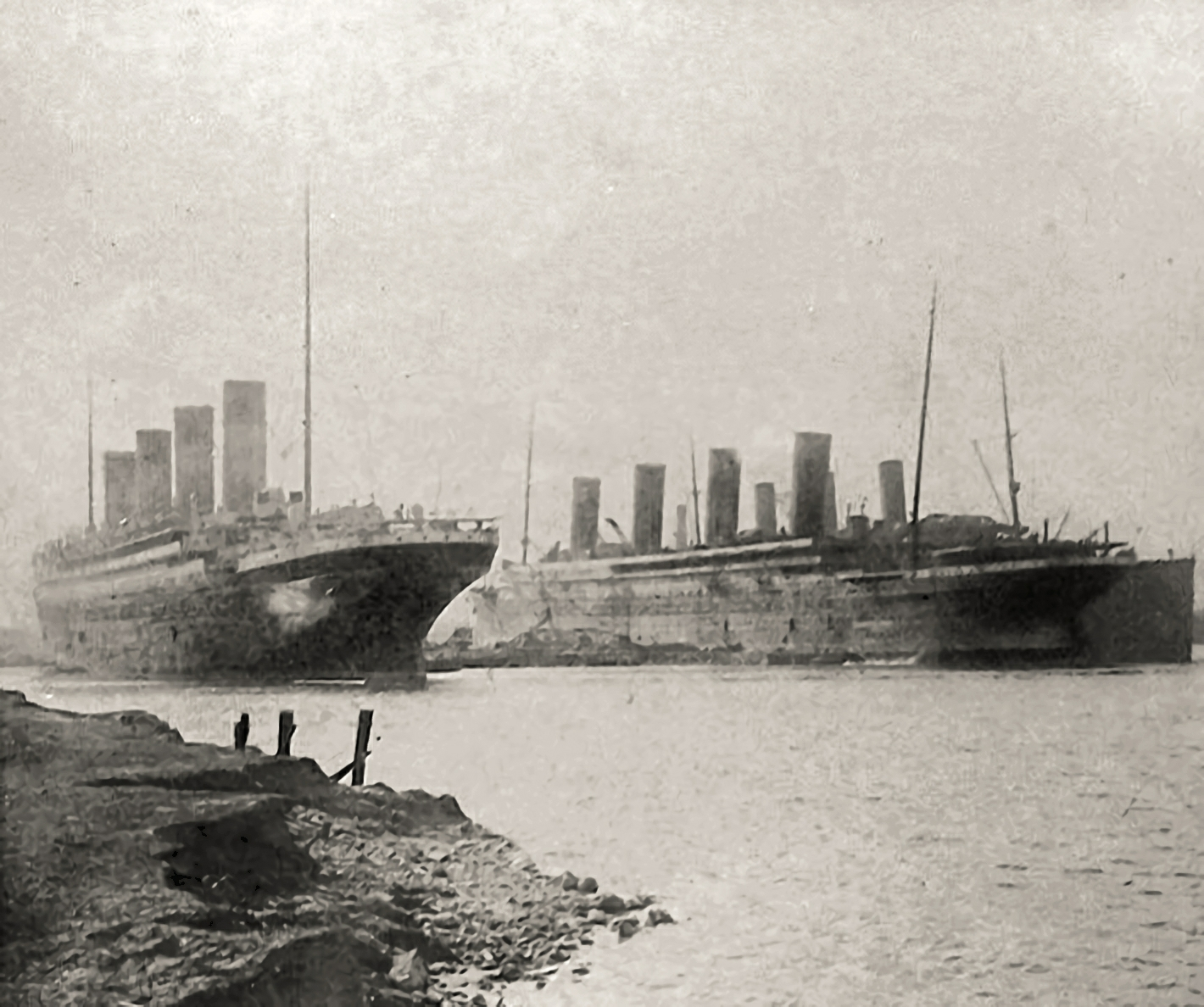
Olympic (left), and Britannic, still fitting out, at Harland & Wolff, c.1915

At 08:12 am on 21 November 1916, HMHS Britannic struck a mine (Note: The hypothesis of the sinking caused by a mine was the one that had been accepted by the inquiry following the sinking. However, it is possible that the sinking was caused by a torpedo (Accessed 21 March 2009)) at 37°42′05″N 24°17′02″E, and sank. Survivors numbered 1,036, and 30 men lost their lives in the disaster. Two survivors, nurse Violet Jessop and stoker Arthur Priest, were notable as having also previously survived the sinking of the Titanic in 1912. Britannic was the largest ship lost during World War I, but her sinking did not receive the same attention as the sinking of her sister ship, or the sinking of the Cunard liner Lusitania, when she was sunk by a torpedo in the Celtic Sea.

== Legacy ==
=== Wrecks and expeditions ===
When Titanic sank in 1912 and Britannic sank in 1916, the Britannic sinking did not receive the same attention as the Titanic, due to the death toll (1,517 on Titanic and 30 on Britannic) and the ongoing First World War. Because the exact position of the sinking of the Britannic is known and the location is shallow, the wreck was discovered relatively easily in 1975. Titanic, however, drew everyone's attention in 1912. After several attempts, the wreck was located by Jean-Louis Michel of Ifremer and Robert Ballard following a top secret mission for the US Navy to investigate the wreckage of USS Thresher and USS Scorpion, two nuclear submarines that sank in the North Atlantic in the 1960s. The discovery of the wreck occurred on 1 September 1985, at 25 kilometres from the position given of the sinking. The wreck lies about 4,000 metres deep, broken in two. The bow is relatively well preserved, but the stern partially imploded, and to a large extent disintegrated during the descent and impact on the seabed. (Note: Unlike the bow, the stern of the ship was not filled with water when it sank, and imploded as a result of the air.)

The wreck of Britannic was discovered in 1975 by Jacques Cousteau. It has a large tear in the front caused by the bow hitting the ocean floor before the rest of the ship sank, as the ship's length is greater than the depth of the water. After the discovery, she has been seen regularly as part of many other expeditions. In contrast to Titanic, which lies at the very bottom of the North Atlantic and is being fed on by iron-eating bacteria, Britannic is in remarkably good condition, and is much more accessible than her infamous sister. Many external structural features are still intact, including the propellers, and a great deal of the superstructure and hull.

=== Cultural heritage ===
Museums and exhibitions pay tribute to the ships, and the two tragedies have inspired many movies, novels and even musicals and video games.

When she was decommissioned in 1935, Olympic –the only surviving ship of her class– was previously set to be converted into a floating hotel, but the project was cancelled. However, its decorative elements were auctioned. The first class lounge and part of the aft grand staircase can be found in the White Swan Hotel, in Alnwick, Northumberland, England. The wood panels of the ship's À la Carte' restaurant are now restored on board the Celebrity Millennium.

=== Tributes and replicas ===
Due to the history and the story behind the sinking of the Titanic, several attempts to recreate the ship, partly or totally, were made throughout the years, from floating replicas, inland recreations, to an actual reimagining of the ship.
