= SS Athenic =

1901 British ocean liner

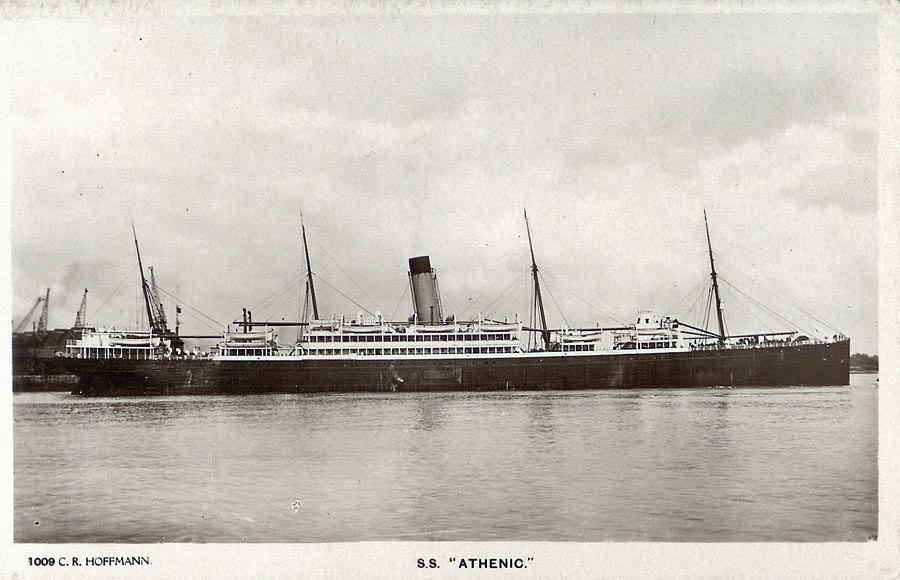
- Postcard of SS Athenic

History

United Kingdom; Norway
- Name: SS Athenic (1901–28)
- Owner: White Star Line (1901–28); Hvalfangerselskapet Pelagos A/S (1928–62)
- Port of registry: (United Kingdom) Liverpool (1901–28); (Norway) Tønsberg (1928–62)
- Builder: Harland and Wolff, Belfast
- Yard number: 341
- Launched: 17 August 1901
- Completed: 23 January 1902
- Commissioned: 14 February 1902
- Renamed: SS Pelagos, 1928
- Reclassified: Whaling factory ship, 1928
- Captured: 15 January 1941 by the German auxiliary cruiser Pinguin
- Fate: Scrapped Hamburg 1962

General characteristics
- Class & type: Athenic-class ocean liner
- Tonnage: 12,234 GRT
- Length: 500 ft 3 in (152.48 m)
- Beam: 63 ft 3 in (19.28 m)
- Propulsion: 2 quadruple expansion steam engines driving 2 screws
- Speed: 14 knots (26 km/h)
- Capacity: 688 passengers: 66–121 First class; 81–117 Second class; 450 Third class
- Crew: 158 to 200

SS Athenic was a British passenger liner built by Harland & Wolff shipyards for the White Star Line in 1901.

== History ==
The 12,234-ton steamship Athenic was built at the Harland & Wolff shipyard in Belfast and launched on 17 August 1901. Athenic was the first of three identical sister ships which were built for the profitable freight and passenger service from London to Wellington, New Zealand. The other two were SS Corinthic (1902) and SS Ionic (1903). They were the first orders of the White Star Line after its takeover by J. P. Morgan's IMM Co.

On 12 February 1902, she sailed from London on her maiden voyage to Wellington. After calling at Plymouth on 15 February before heading south, she had onboard 164 passengers; 29 First Class, 25 Second Class and 140 Third Class, a majority of them English immigrants. Following a route similar to that of White Star's Jubilee Class service to Australia, Athenic and her sisters provided service to South Africa and Tasmania as well via the Canary Islands, calling at Cape Town before crossing the Indian Ocean, after which she called at the Tasmanian capital of Hobart before making port at Wellington on 27 March.

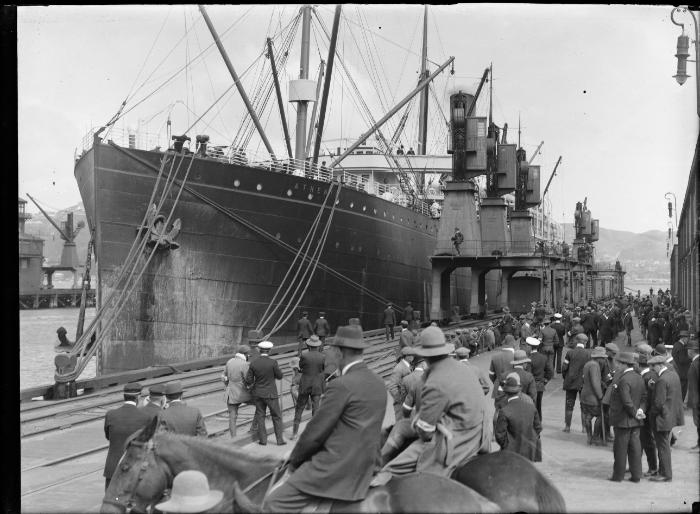
Athenic moored at Queens Wharf, Wellington (1913)

Like her sister ships, Athenic had two eight-cylinder quadruple expansion steam-powered engines by Harland & Wolff, working the ship's two propellers that delivered 604 nominal horsepower and giving a service speed of 14 knots (26 km/h). Her passenger capacity was 121 first class, 117 second class and 450 third class. She was equipped with electric lighting and cooling chambers for transport of frozen meat, specifically lamb.

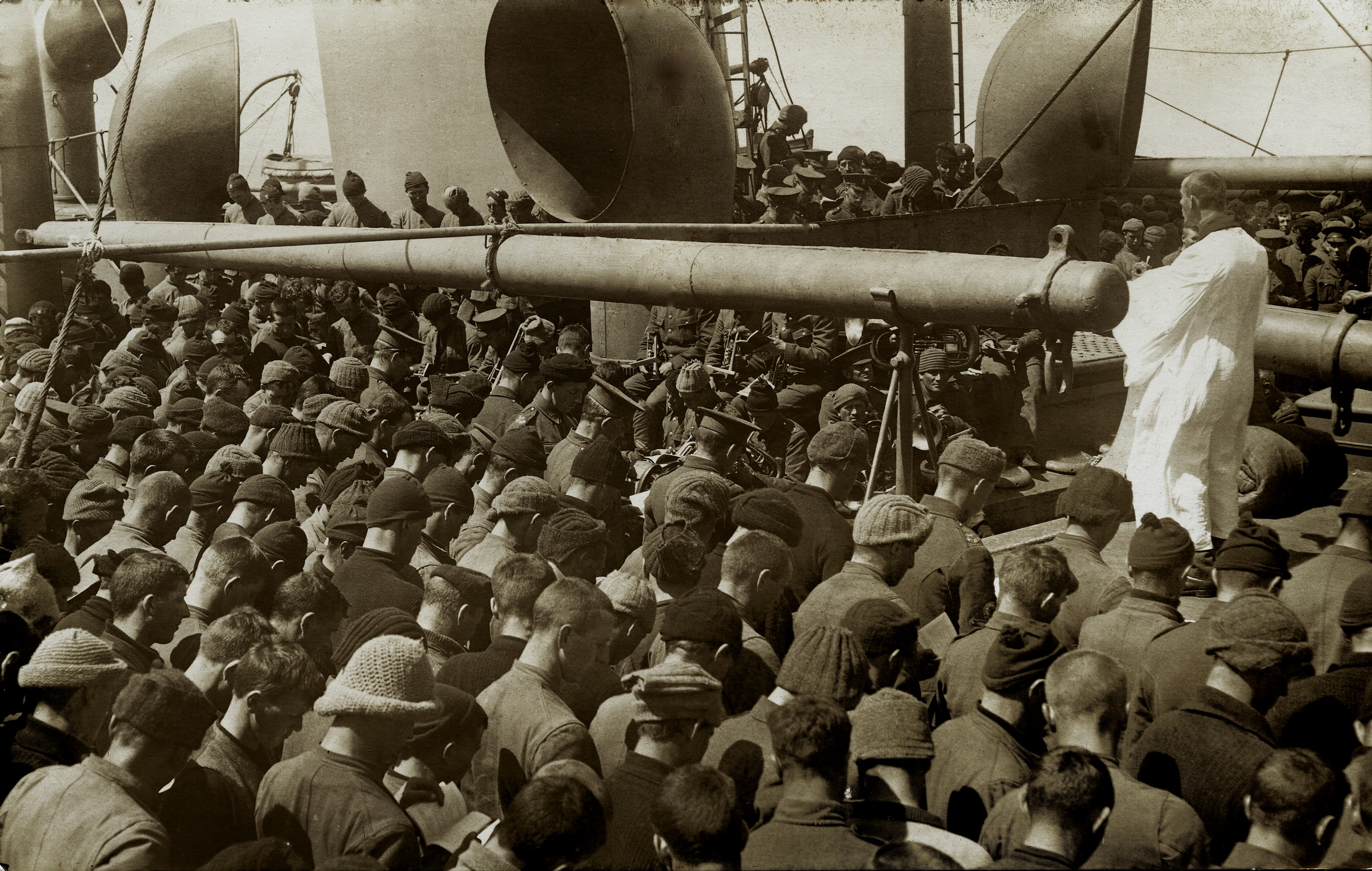
'Divine Service' on board the Athenic, 1914

When war was declared between the United Kingdom and Germany in August 1914, Athenic was in Wellington, New Zealand, and was requisitioned as a troopship under the British Liner Requisition Scheme. On 23 September 1914 she was in Lyttelton (Christchurch) in the South Island of New Zealand, where as one of the transports carrying what was known collectively as the "Main Body", she took on board the following units of the New Zealand Expeditionary Force: Headquarters, Mounted Rifles Brigade, the Canterbury Mounted Rifles Regt. (2 squadrons) and the Canterbury Infantry Battalion (less 1 Company). The Officer Commanding Troops was Colonel A.H. Russell. In total Athenic carried 54 officers, 1,259 men and 339 horses. She proceeded to Wellington and berthed there till 16 October 1914, when it was judged safe to depart. She sailed across the globe, sailing per convoy by way of Hobart, Albany, Colombo, Aden and finally arriving in Alexandria to disembark the soldiers on 3 December 1914. SS Athenic was designated at that time as being (His Majesty's New Zealand Transport) HMNZT 11. She was the largest troopship ever sent from New Zealand transporting New Zealand forces to the Middle East. Athenic acted several other times as a transport throughout World War I, with a new number for each voyage she undertook.

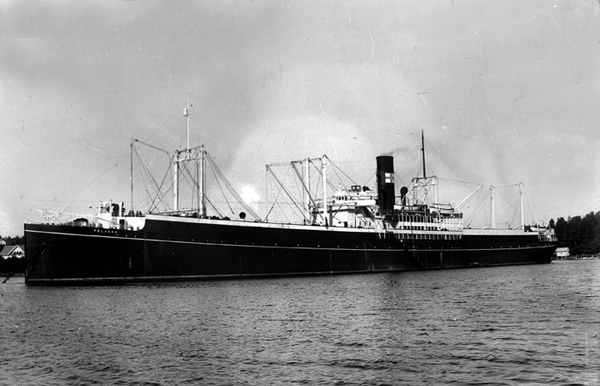
Pelagos, 1931

Throughout the course of her career, Athenic carried 26,274 passengers to South Africa, Australia and New Zealand.

In 1928, she came to a Norwegian company and was renamed SS Pelagos. Torpedoed in 1944, she was refloated the following year and continued to serve until her demolition in 1962.

== Sources ==
- Ship Description from The Ships List
- Athenic-class ocean liners at ssMaritime.com
- Athenic records at Auckland War Memorial Museum
- Details of Athenic's service as a New Zealand transport throughout WWI From NZ Transport Ships at the Flotilla Australia website.
