= SS Corinthic (1902) =

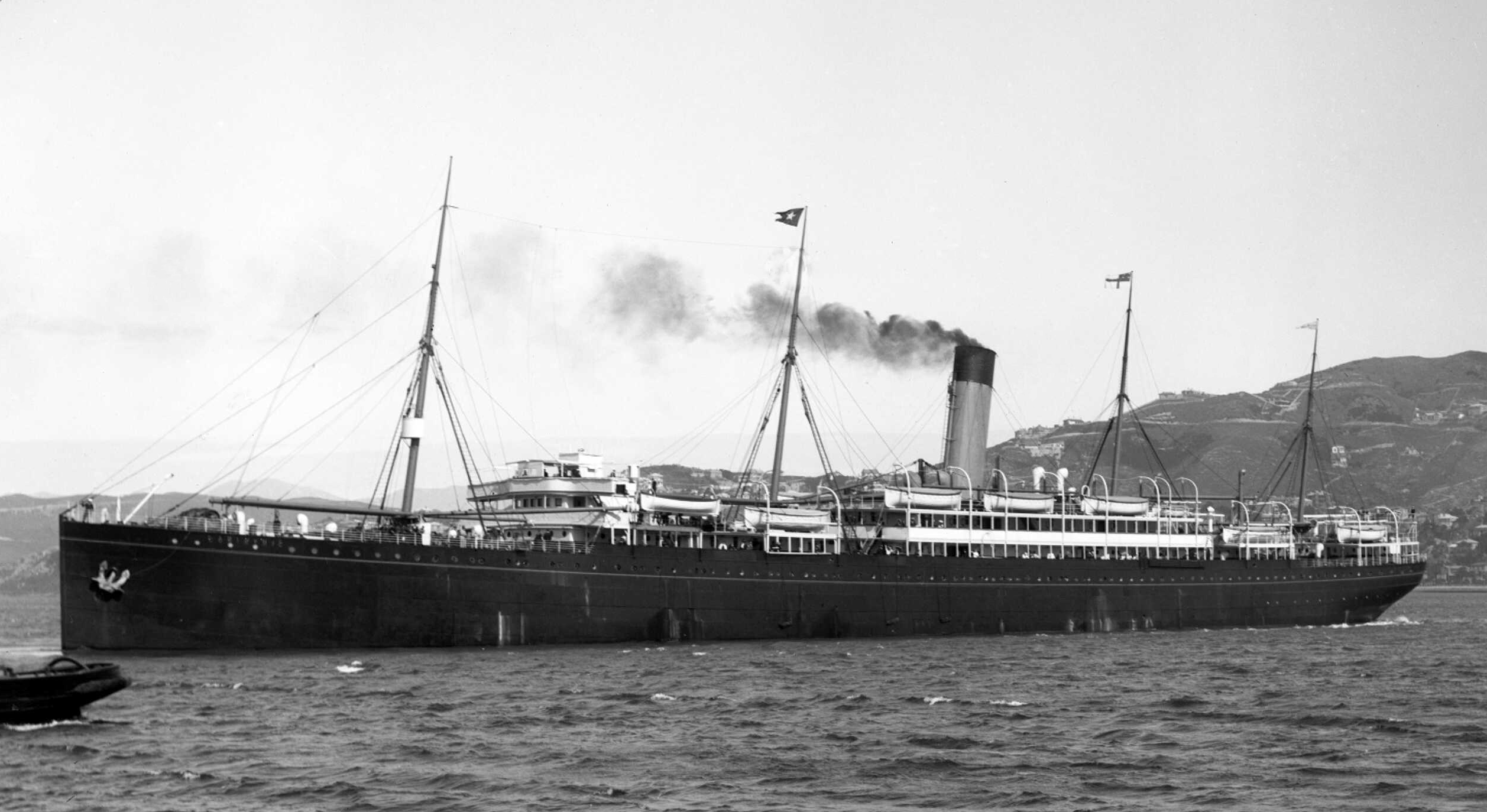
- SS Corinthic at Wellington

History

United Kingdom
- Name: Corinthic
- Owner: White Star Line
- Port of registry: Liverpool, United Kingdom
- Builder: Harland & Wolff, Belfast
- Yard number: 343
- Launched: 10 April 1902
- Completed: 14 July 1902
- Commissioned: 20 November 1902
- Maiden voyage: 20 November 1902
- Identification: UK official number 112596; code letters TLWJ
- Fate: Scrapped December 1931

General characteristics
- Class & type: Athenic-class ocean liner
- Tonnage: 12,367 GRT
- Length: 500.3 feet (152.5 m)
- Beam: 63.3 feet (19.3 m)
- Depth: 45 feet (14 m)
- Installed power: 604 NHP
- Propulsion: quadruple expansion steam engines; twin screw
- Speed: 14 knots (26 km/h)
- Capacity: 121 (First Class); 117 (Second Class); 450 (Third Class)
- Crew: 185 to 200

SS Corinthic was a British passenger ship, built in 1902 by Harland & Wolff and launched for the British shipping companies White Star Line and Shaw, Savill & Albion Line. She was the second of the Athenic-class ocean liners built for passenger and cargo service between Britain and New Zealand. Her sister ships were SS Athenic (1902) and SS Ionic (1903).

On 19 November 1902, she sailed from London on her maiden voyage to Wellington. After calling at Plymouth on 22 November before heading south, she had onboard 589 passengers; 61 First Class, 83 Second Class and 452 Third Class, a majority of them English immigrants. Following a route similar to that of White Star's Jubilee Class service to Australia, Athenic and her sisters provided service to South Africa and Tasmania as well via the Canary Islands, calling at Cape Town before crossing the Indian Ocean, after which she called at the Tasmanian capital of Hobart before making port at Wellington on 6 January.

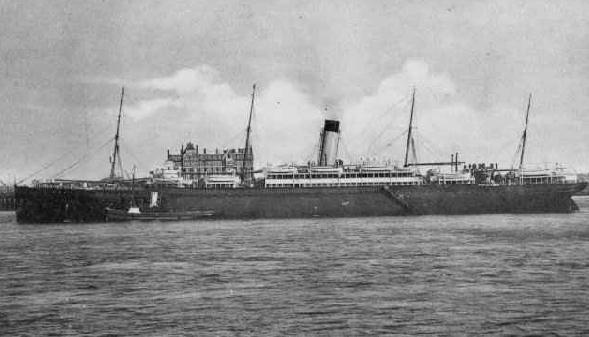
Photograph of Corinthic

In 1931 Corinthic was decommissioned and scrapped.

== Sources ==
- Ship Description from The Ships List
