= SS Ionic (1902) =

Steam-powered ocean liner built in 1902

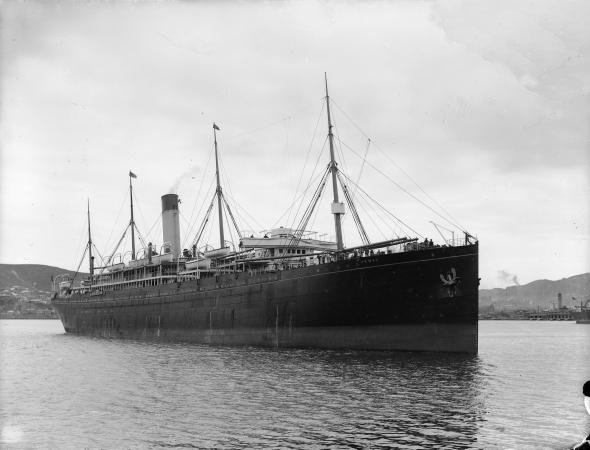

History

United Kingdom
- Name: SS Ionic
- Operator: White Star Line (1902–1934); Shaw, Savill & Albion Line (1934–1936)
- Builder: Harland & Wolff, Belfast
- Yard number: 346
- Laid down: 1902
- Launched: 22 May 1902
- Completed: 15 December 1902
- Identification: UK Official number 115337; Code letters TSFH (until 1933); Call sign GLSZ (from 1934)
- Fate: Scrapped in 1936, Osaka, Japan

General characteristics
- Class & type: Athenic-class ocean liner
- Tonnage: 12,352 GRT
- Length: 500.3 feet (152.5 m)
- Beam: 63.3 feet (19.3 m)
- Depth: 45 feet (14 m)
- Installed power: 604 NHP
- Propulsion: Quadruple expansion steam engines; Twin screw propellers
- Speed: 14 knots (26 km/h)
- Capacity: 688 passengers

SS Ionic was a steam-powered ocean liner built in 1902 by Harland & Wolff in Belfast for the White Star Line. She was the second White Star Liner to be named Ionic and served on the United Kingdom – New Zealand route. Her sister ships were SS Athenic and SS Corinthic.

== History ==
Ionic was launched at Harland & Wolff's yard at the Queen's Island in Belfast on 22 May 1902. She was originally built to carry passengers and refrigerated meat between the United Kingdom and New Zealand, and began her maiden voyage from London to Wellington via Cape Town on 16 January 1903. Ionic was the first ship on the New Zealand route to be fitted with a Marconi wireless set. She was built with only one buff-coloured, black topped smokestack and four passenger decks. Ionic was also equipped with four masts. She was fitted with electrical lighting and had an open promenade deck and the golden White Star Line stripe along her hull.

In 1914, at the beginning of World War I, Ionic was requisitioned as a troop ship for the New Zealand Expeditionary Force and in 1915 she narrowly missed a torpedo by less than 15 yards while steaming through the Mediterranean Sea. On 31 January Ionic returned to her former New Zealand passenger service via the Panama Canal.

In 1927 Ionic came to the aid of the crew aboard a French fishing vessel, Daisy, that had run aground in Grand Banks.

Ionic's final refit before the Cunard-White Star merger was completed in 1929. She was converted to accommodate only cabin class and third class passengers. In 1934 after the White Star Line and Cunard Line merged, Ionic was sold to Shaw, Savill & Albion Line. Ionic kept her name but her prefix "SS" was changed to "RMS". The RMS Ionic was scrapped two years later in 1936 in Osaka, Japan. The Auckland War Memorial Museum has preserved her ship's bell.
