= George Mcleod Paterson =

English engineer and ship designer (1891-1953)

- Born: 1891; Cheltenham, England
- Died: 1953 (aged 61–62); Weston-super-Mare, England
- Known for: Designing the RMS Queen Mary and the RMS Queen Elizabeth

George Mcleod Paterson was an English engineer and ship designer, best known for being the designer of the RMS Queen Mary and the RMS Queen Elizabeth.

== Early life ==
Paterson was born in Cheltenham in 1891. He attended Cheltenham College and Pembroke College, Cambridge. He gained his early experience in shipbuilding with John Brown & Company and after serving with the Department of the Director of Naval Construction during World War 1

== Career ==
After World War 1 he joined the Cunard Line. In 1924 he succeeded Leonard Peskett to become the company's chief designer, a post which he held for 26 years. During his tenure as the chief designer he designed two of the most famous ships in the world at the time the RMS Queen Elizabeth and the RMS Queen Mary. He was also the designer of the RMS Caronia which was well known for its green hull. He has been praised for being the man who brought back maritime glory to the UK in a time when merchant service status was in jeopardy. He passed away unexpectedly in December 1953.

Paterson received many accolades throughout his life including a CBE, a Bachelor of Arts from the University of Cambridge and a MINA award.
