= RMS Aquitania =

British ocean liner (in service 1914–1950)

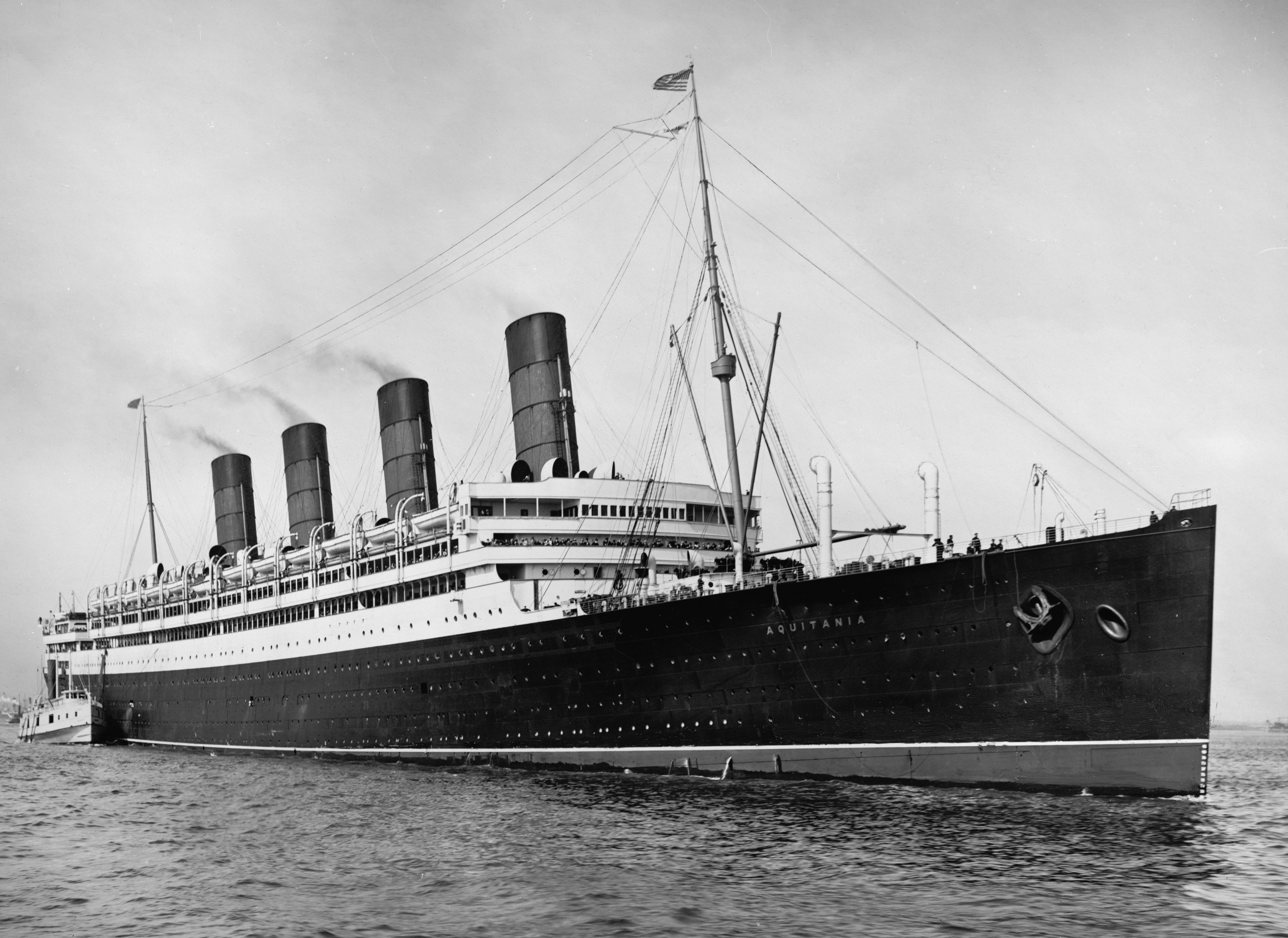
- RMS Aquitania on her maiden voyage in New York Harbor, 5 June 1914.

History

United Kingdom
- Name: Aquitania
- Namesake: Aquitania (Roman province in France)
- Owner: 1914–1934: Cunard Line; 1934–1949: Cunard White Star Line; 1949–1950: Cunard Line
- Operator: Cunard Line
- Port of registry: Liverpool, United Kingdom
- Route: Southampton-Cherbourg-New York (1919–1939) Southampton-Halifax (1946–1949)
- Ordered: 8 December 1910
- Builder: John Brown & Company, Clydebank, Scotland
- Yard number: 409
- Laid down: December 1910
- Launched: 21 April 1913
- Christened: 21 April 1913 by the Countess of Derby
- Completed: 1914
- Acquired: 24 May 1914
- Maiden voyage: 30 May–5 June 1914, from Liverpool to New York
- In service: 1914–1949 (35 years)
- Out of service: 21 February 1950
- Identification: Wireless call sign: MSU (by 1915)
- Nickname(s): Ship Beautiful
- Fate: Scrapped in 1950–51 at Faslane, Scotland.

General characteristics
- Type: Ocean liner
- Tonnage: 45,647 GRT, 21,993 NRT
- Displacement: 49,430 tons
- Length: 901 ft (274.6 m)
- Beam: 97 ft (29.6 m)
- Height: 164 ft (50.0 m) from bottom to top
- Draught: 36 ft (11.0 m)
- Depth: 92.5 ft (28.2 m)
- Decks: 10
- Installed power: Direct drive Parsons steam turbines; 59,000 shp (44,000 kW)
- Propulsion: Four shafts
- Speed: 23 knots (43 km/h; 26 mph) (service speed in 1914); 24 knots (44 km/h; 28 mph) (service speed from 1936 onwards); 25 knots (46 km/h; 29 mph) (max speed)
- Capacity: 1914: 3,230; 618 1st class passengers; 614 2nd class passengers; 2,004 3rd class passengers; 1926: 2,200; 610 1st class passengers; 950 2nd class passengers; 640 3rd class passengers
- Crew: 972
- Notes: Aquitania was: The longest-serving express ocean liner of the 20th century.; The only major ocean liner to serve in both world wars.; The last four-funneled ship at the time of her scrapping.; Nicknamed “The Ship Beautiful”

RMS Aquitania was a British ocean liner operated by the Cunard Line from 1914 to 1950. She was designed by Leonard Peskett and built by John Brown & Company in Clydebank, Scotland. She was launched on 21 April 1913 and sailed on her maiden voyage from Liverpool to New York on 30 May 1914. She was given the title of Royal Mail Ship (RMS) like many other Cunard ocean liners since she carried the royal mail on many of her voyages. Aquitania was the third in Cunard Line's grand trio of express liners, preceded by RMS Mauretania and RMS Lusitania, and was the last surviving four-funnelled ocean liner. In general, she was also the last four-funnelled ocean-going passenger vessel until the debut of the Disney Adventure 75 years after her retirement. Shortly after Aquitania entered service, the First World War broke out, during which she was first converted into an auxiliary cruiser before being used as a troop transport and a hospital ship, notably as part of the Dardanelles Campaign.

Returned to transatlantic passenger service in 1920, she operated alongside Mauretania and the Berengaria. Considered during this period of time as one of the most attractive ships, Aquitania earned the nickname "the Ship Beautiful" from her passengers. She continued in service after the merger of Cunard Line with White Star Line in 1934. The company planned to retire her and replace her with RMS Queen Elizabeth in 1940.

However, the outbreak of the Second World War allowed the ship to remain in service for ten more years. During the war and until 1947, she served as a troop transport. She was used in particular to take home Canadian soldiers from Europe. After the war, she transported migrants to Canada before the Board of Trade found her unfit for further commercial service. Aquitania was retired from service in 1949 and was sold for scrapping the following year. Having served as a passenger ship for 36 years, Aquitania ended her career as the longest-serving Cunard vessel, a record which stood for six years until overtaken by RMS Scythia's service record of 37 years. In 2004 Aquitania's service record was pushed into third place when Queen Elizabeth 2 became the longest-serving Cunard vessel. She was nicknamed The Ship Beautiful for her interior and Cunard's Old Reliable for her war service.

== Conception ==
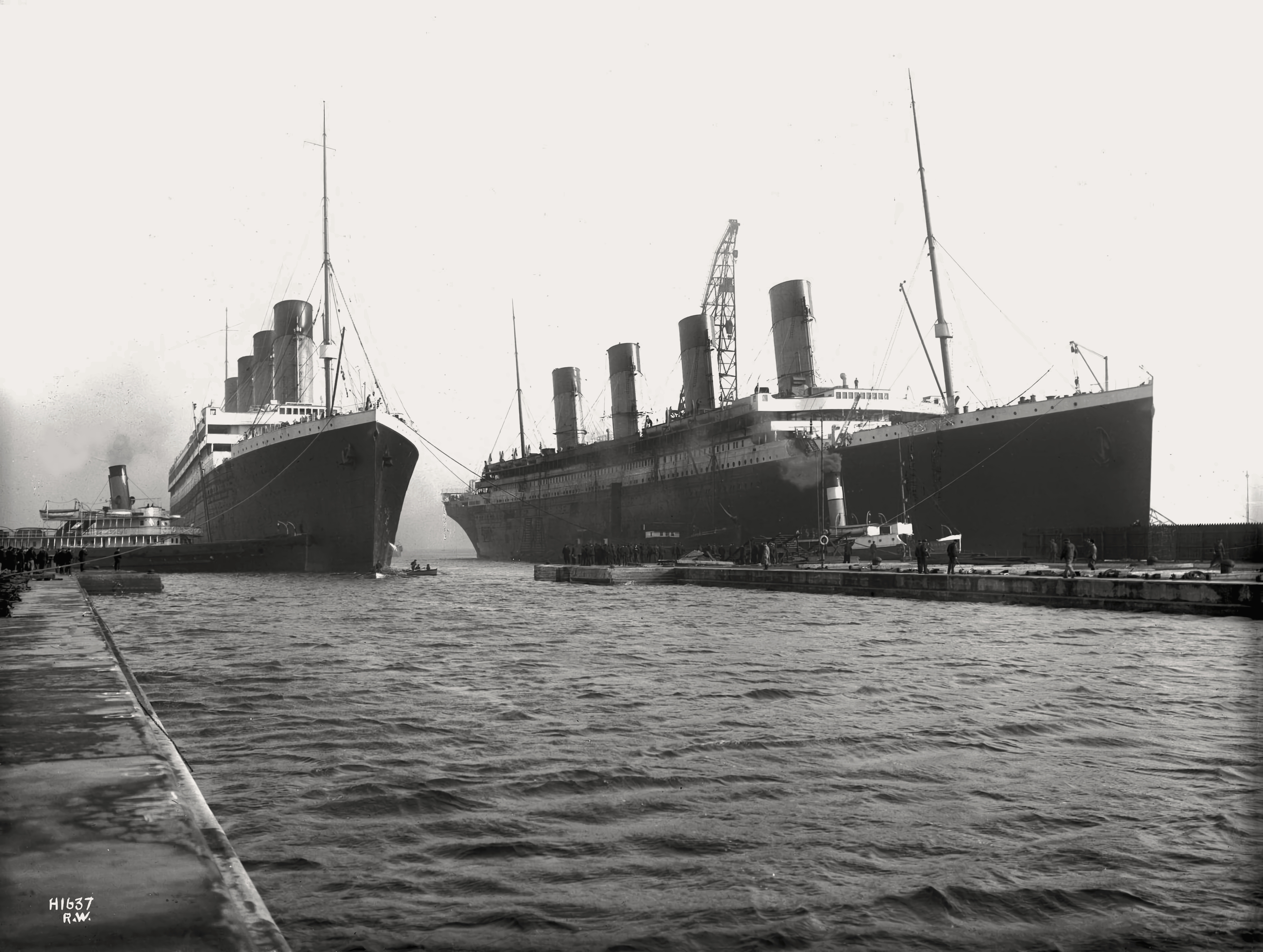
White Star's Olympic and Titanic, Mauretania and Lusitania's rivals.

The origins of Aquitania lay in the rivalry between the White Star Line and Cunard Line, Britain's two leading shipping companies. The White Star Line Olympic, Titanic and the upcoming Britannic were larger than the latest Cunard ships, Mauretania and Lusitania, by 15,000 gross register tons. The Cunard duo were significantly faster than the White Star ships, while White Star's ships were seen as more luxurious. Cunard needed another liner for its weekly transatlantic express service, and elected to copy the White Star Line's Olympic-class model with a slightly slower but larger and more luxurious ship. The plan for the building of that liner began in 1910, under the leadership of Leonard Peskett. Several draft plans were conceived in order to determine the main axes of what should be the ship for which an average speed of 24 knots (28 mph; 44 km/h) was planned. In July of that year, the company launched the construction offers to several shipyards before choosing John Brown and Company, the builder of the Lusitania. The company chose Aquitania as the name for its new ship in continuity with those of its two previous duo. The three ships were named respectively after the Ancient Roman provinces Lusitania, Mauretania, and Aquitania.

== Design, construction and launch ==
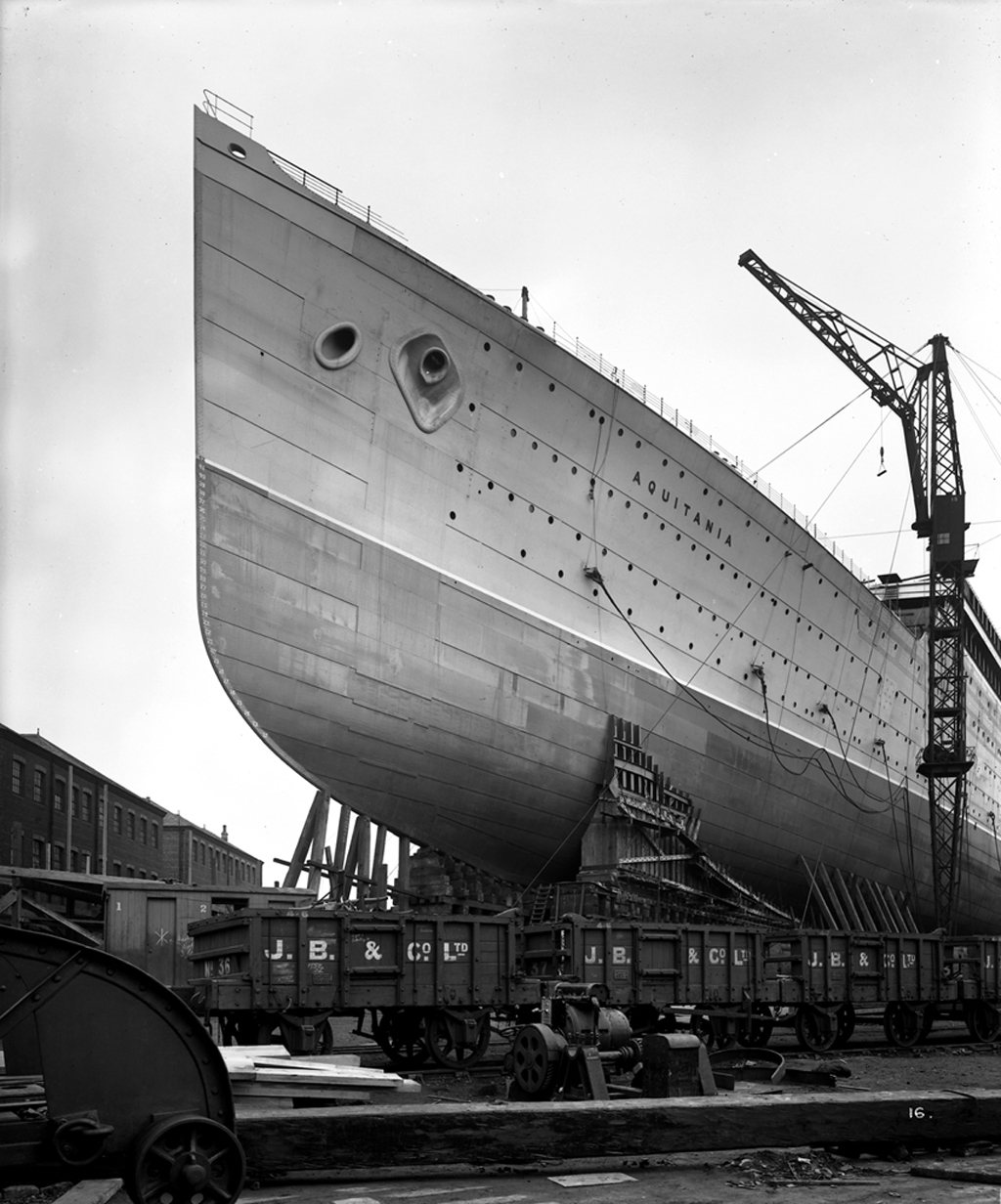
Aquitania shortly before her launch.

Aquitania was designed by Cunard naval architect Leonard Peskett. She was a one of a kind liner as she did not have an identical sister ship of size and appointments as with Lusitania/Mauretania or Olympic/Titanic. Peskett drew up plans for a larger and wider vessel than Lusitania and Mauretania (about 130 feet (40 m) longer). With four large funnels the ship would resemble the famous speed duo, but Peskett also designed the superstructure with "glassed in" touches from the smaller Carmania, a ship he also designed. Another design feature from Carmania was the addition of two tall forward deck ventilator cowlings. Although the ship's outward dimensions were greater than that of Olympic, her displacement and tonnage were lower. With Aquitania's keel being laid at the end of 1910, the experienced Peskett took a voyage on Olympic in 1911 so as to experience the feel of a ship reaching nearly 50,000 tonnes (49,000 long tons; 55,000 short tons), as well as to copy pointers for his company's new vessel. Though Aquitania was built solely with Cunard funds, Peskett designed her according to strict British Admiralty specifications. Aquitania was built in the John Brown and Company yards in Clydebank, Scotland, where the majority of the Cunard ships were built. The keel was laid in the same plot where Lusitania had been built, and would later be used to construct Queen Mary, Queen Elizabeth, and Queen Elizabeth 2. Just like with Mauretania, for the launch the hull was painted in a light grey colour for photographic purposes; a common practice of the day for the first ship in a new class, as it made the lines of the ship clearer in the black-and-white photographs. Her hull was repainted to black in dry dock.

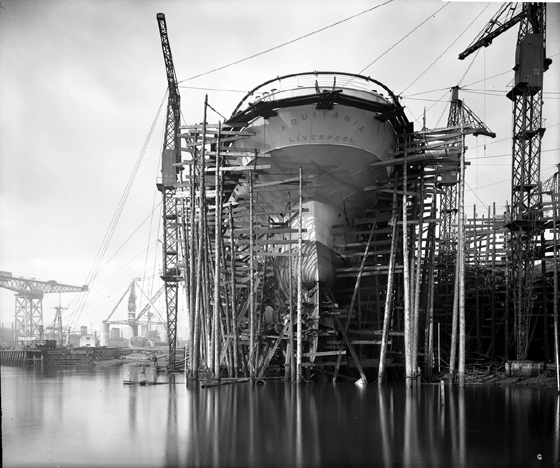
Aquitania on the stocks, 1913.

In the wake of the Titanic sinking, Aquitania was one of the first new ships to carry enough lifeboats for all passengers and crew. Eighty lifeboats, including two motorised launches with Marconi wireless equipment, were carried in both swan-neck and newer Welin type davits. There was also a double hull and watertight compartments that were designed to allow the ship to float with five compartments flooded. As required by the British Admiralty, she was designed to be converted into an armed merchant cruiser, and was reinforced to mount guns for service in that role. The ship displaced approximately 49,430 tons, of which the hull accounted for 29,150 tons, machinery 9,000 and bunkers 6,000 tons.

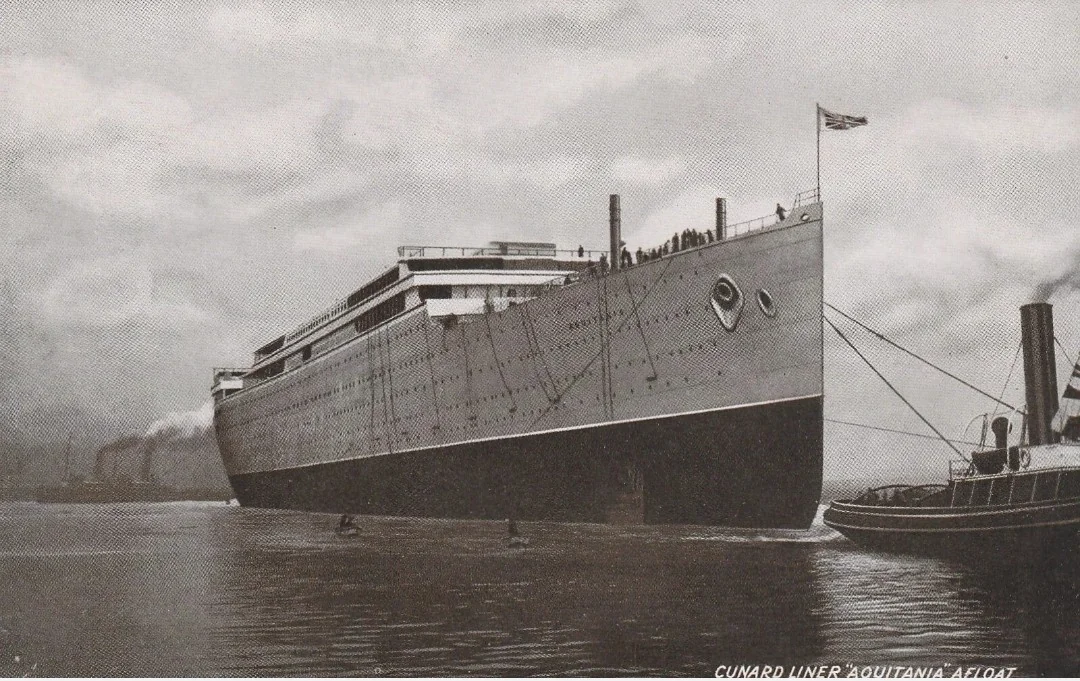
Aquitania shortly after launch.

Aquitania was launched on 21 April 1913 after being christened by Alice Stanley, the Countess of Derby, and fitted out over the next thirteen months. Notable installations were electrical wiring and decorations. The fitting out was led by Arthur Joseph Davis and his associate Charles Mewès. On 10 May 1914, she was tested in her sea trials and steamed at one full knot over the expected speed. On 14 May, she reached Mersey and stayed at a port there for fifteen days, during which she underwent a final major cleaning and finishing in preparation for her maiden voyage.

== Technical aspects ==
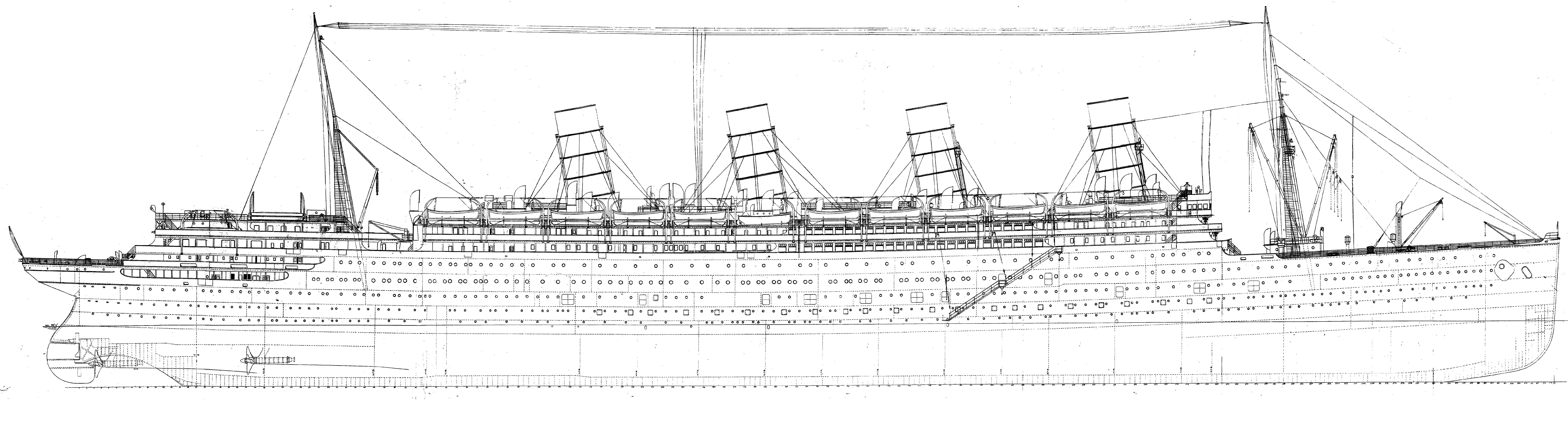
Technical drawing of Aquitania in starboard profile.

Aquitania was the first Cunard liner to have a length in excess of 900 feet (270 m). Unlike some four-funneled ships, such as White Star Line's Olympic class ocean liners, Aquitania did not have a dummy funnel; each funnel was utilised in venting smoke from the ship's boilers.

Steam was provided by twenty-one forced-draft, double-ended Scotch boilers, having eight furnaces each, that were 22 feet (6.7 m) long with diameter of 17 feet 8 inches (5.4 m) arranged in four boiler rooms. Each boiler room had seven ash expellers with pump capacity of approximately 4,500 tons per hour that could also be used as emergency bilge pumps.

Steam drove Parsons turbines in three separate engine rooms in a triple expansion system for four shafts. The port engine room contained the high pressure ahead (240 tons, 40 feet 2 inches (12.2 m) long with four stage expansion) and astern turbine (120 tons, 22 feet 11 inches (7.0 m) long) for the port shaft, the centre room contained two low pressure turbines with ahead and astern capability within single casings (54 feet 3 inches (16.5 m) long, nine expansion stages in ahead turbine, four in astern turbine) for the two centre shafts and the starboard room contained the intermediate pressure ahead turbine (41 feet 6.5 inches (12.7 m) long) and a high pressure astern turbine (twin of the port high pressure turbine) for the starboard shaft.

The electrical plant, located on G deck below the waterline, consisted of four 540-horsepower (400 kW) British Westinghouse generator sets generating 225 volt direct current, with emergency power provided by a diesel driven 40-horsepower (30 kW) generator up on the promenade deck. Power was provided for about 10,000 lamps and about 180 electric motors. She also had brass triple chambered three chime steam whistles on the 1st funnel and 2nd funnel.

== Interior and design ==
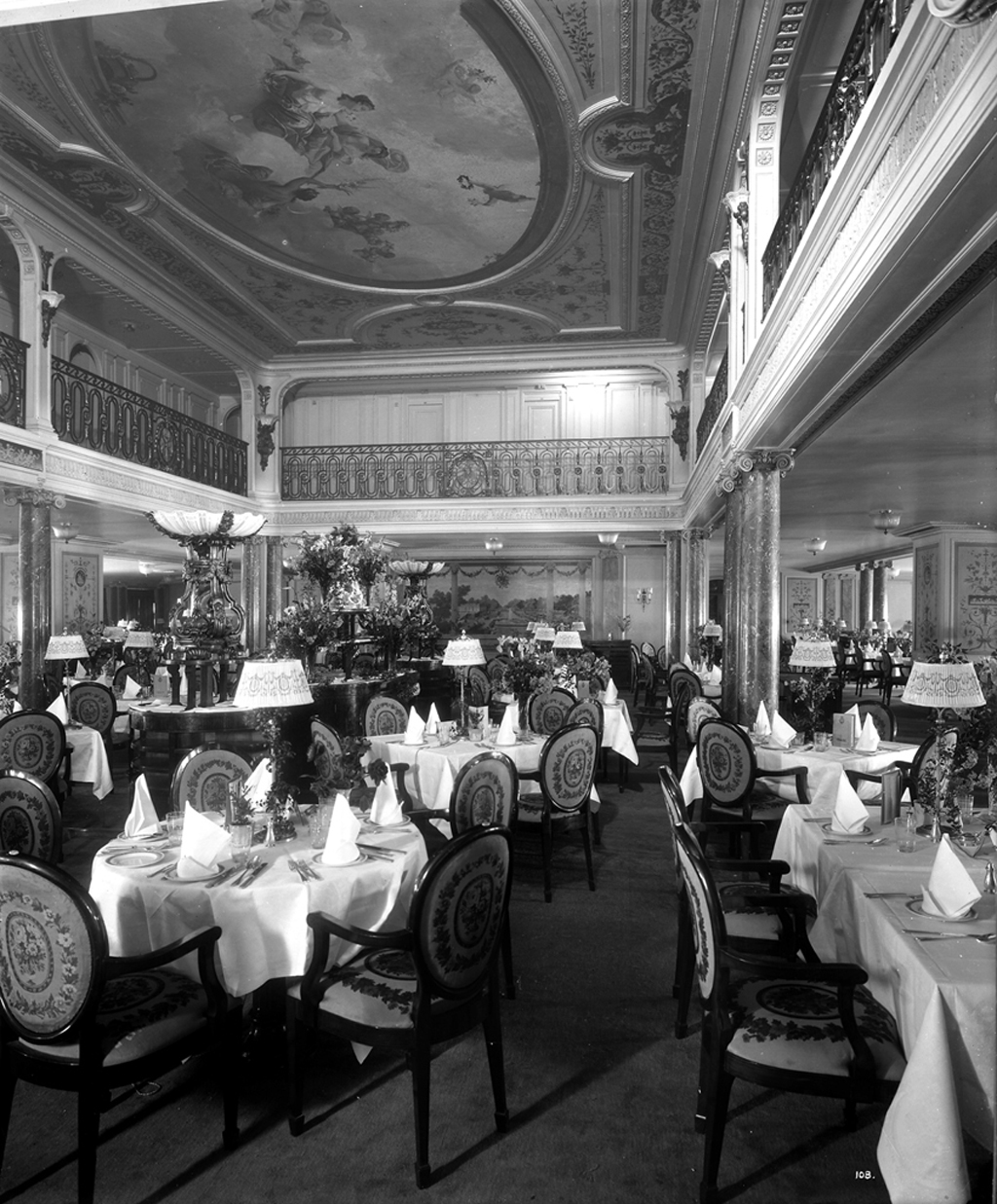
View of the First Class Dining Saloon.

In 1914, Aquitania had the capacity to carry 3,220 passengers (618 First Class, 614 Second Class, 2,004 Third Class). After a refit in 1926, the figure was reduced to 610 in first class, 950 in second class, and 640 in tourist class. Although the original specification mentioned a capacity of 972 crew members, the ship sometimes carried around 1,100.

Although Aquitania lacked the lean, yacht-like appearance of running mates Mauretania and Lusitania, the greater length and wider beam allowed for grander and more spacious public rooms. Her public spaces were designed by the British architect Arthur Joseph Davis of the interior decorating firm Mewès and Davis. This firm had overseen the construction and decoration of the Ritz Hotel in London and Davis himself had designed several banks in that city. His partner in the firm, Charles Mewès, had designed the interiors of the Paris Ritz, and had been commissioned by Albert Ballin, head of Germany's Hamburg America Line (HAPAG), to decorate the interiors of the company's new liner Amerika in 1905.

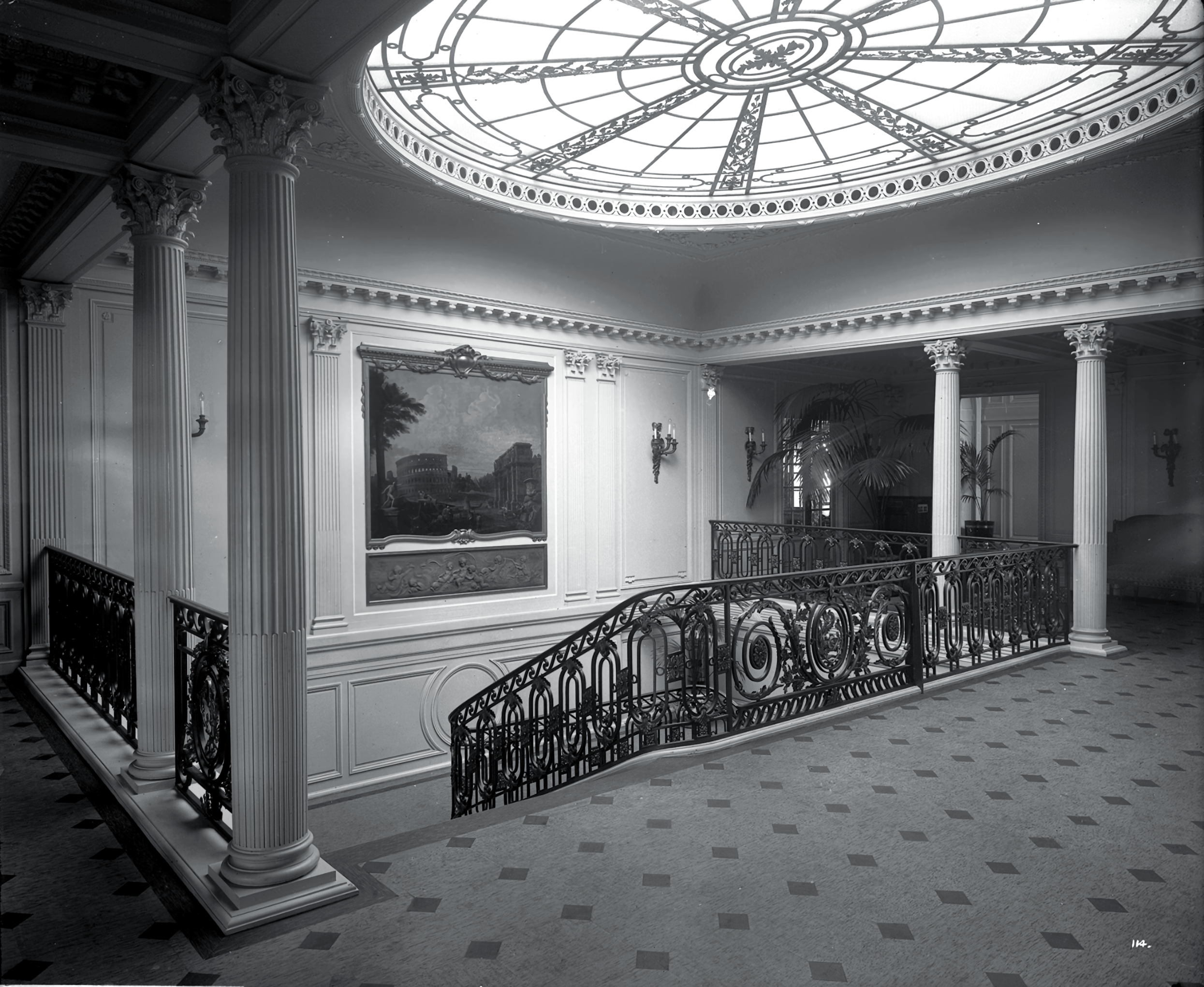
The Grand Staircase of RMS Aquitania.

In the years prior to the First World War, Mewès was charged with the decoration of HAPAG's trio of giant new ships, Imperator, Vaterland, and Bismarck, while Davis was awarded the contract for Aquitania. In a curious arrangement between the rival Cunard and Hamburg-Amerika Lines, Mewès and Davis worked apart—in Germany and England respectively and exclusively—with neither partner being able to disclose details of his work to the other. Although this arrangement was almost certainly violated, Aquitania's first-class interiors were largely the work of Davis. The Louis XVI dining saloon owed much to Mewès' work on the HAPAG liners, but it is likely that having worked so closely together for many years the two designers' work had become almost interchangeable. Indeed, Davis must be given credit for the Carolean smoking room and the Palladian lounge; a faithful interpretation of the style of architect John Webb.

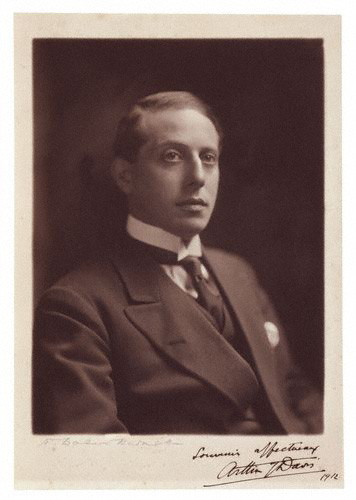
Arthur Joseph Davis was the person who designed the interior of Aquitania.

The second class had a dining room, several lounges, a smoking room, a veranda café, and a gymnasium; many being unique facilities for this class on British ocean liners of the time. The third class had several common areas, a promenade, and three shared bathrooms. The cabins offered great comfort. The first class included eight luxury suites, named after famous painters. A large number of first-class cabins had bathrooms, although not all did. The second-class cabins were larger than average, most being capable of accommodating three people as opposed to the standard four. Her Third Class accommodations were a great expansion in facilities compared to her running mates. While most Cunard liners had their Third Class areas confined forward, aboard Aquitania such spaces spanned the full length of the ship, and included several large open areas, three large dining rooms and both open and enclosed promenades.

Over her thirty-five years career, her facilities changed. Examples of this were the addition of a cinema during her refit from 1932 to 1933 and the reorganisation of the tourist class during the 1920s for giving greater comfort to poor passengers.

== Early career and World War I ==
A famous poster of Aquitania shows a cut-away of the ship, revealing its luxurious interior.

Aquitania's maiden voyage was under the command of Captain William Turner on 30 May 1914 with arrival in New York on 5 June. The voyage and arrival in New York received great attention. Fifteen days earlier, the German liner SS Vaterland, being the largest ship in the world at the time, was put into service. In the eye of the press, this maiden voyage was a matter of national prestige. However, this event was overshadowed by the sinking of the RMS Empress of Ireland in Quebec the previous day with over a thousand drowned. However, no passenger cancelled their voyage aboard the Aquitania, despite the strong emotion aroused by this sinking.

The crossing fully satisfied the crew and the company and many passengers enjoyed the voyage. Average speed for the voyage, a distance of 3,181 nautical miles (5,891 km; 3,661 mi) measured from Liverpool to the Ambrose Channel lightship, was 23.1 knots (42.8 km/h; 26.6 mph), taking into account a five-hour stop due to fog and the proximity of icebergs. The ship briefly managed to exceed 25 knots (46 km/h; 29 mph). Also, her coal consumption was significantly lower than that of Lusitania and Mauretania. On the return trip, the success was renewed; she carried a total of 2,649 passengers, which was a record for a British liner leaving New York.

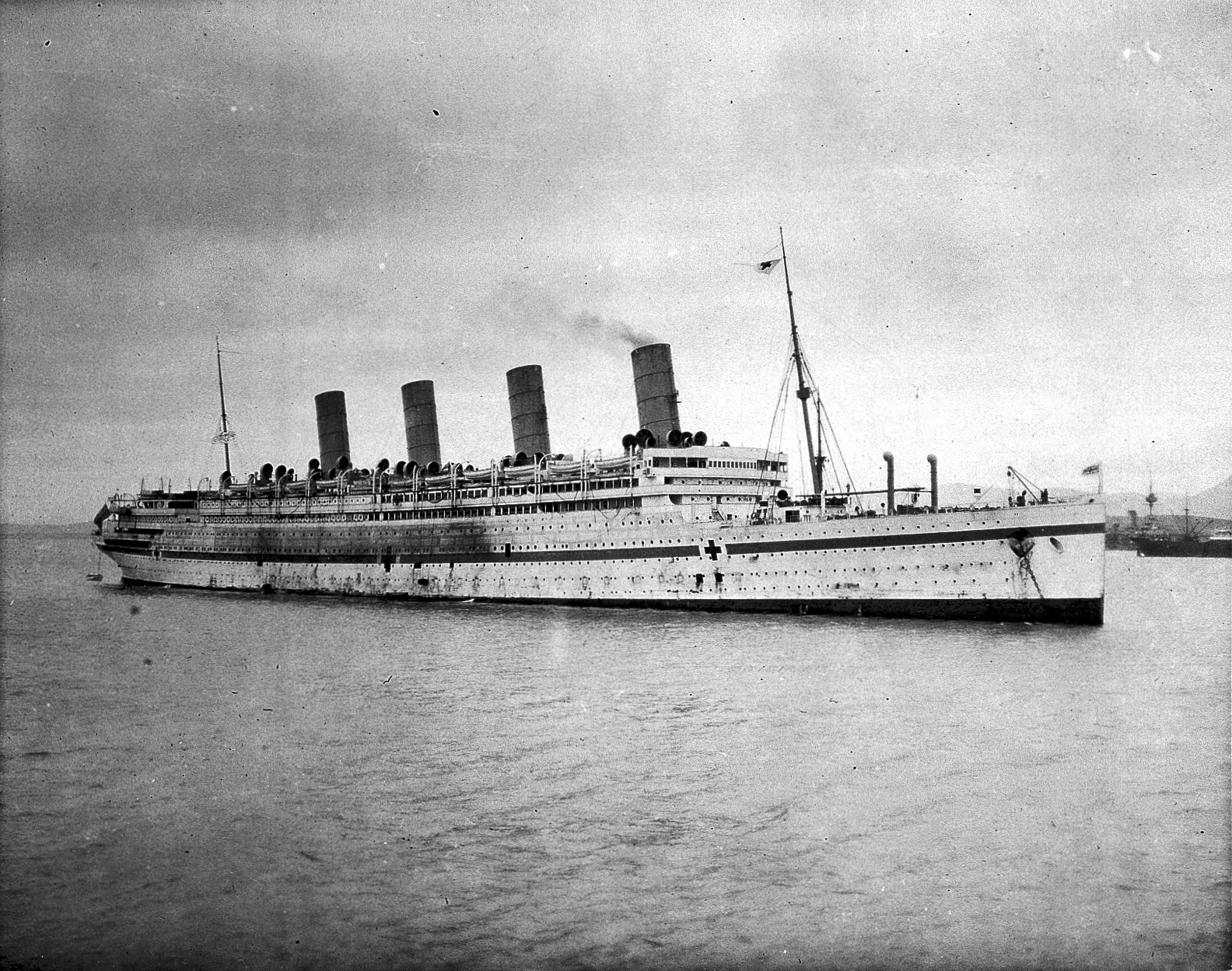
Aquitania as a hospital ship in World War I.

Upon arrival at her home port, she underwent minor modifications, which took into account observations made during the two first crossings (this was typical for a liner after its first round trip). Two more round trips took place in the second half of June and the whole of July of that year. Her architect Peskett was on board during those trips to note any defect and room for improvement. In total, 11,208 passengers travelled on the ship during her first six crossings. Her career was abruptly interrupted by the outbreak of World War I, which removed her from passenger service for six years.

Aquitania was converted into an armed merchant cruiser on 5 August 1914, for which provision had been made in her design. On 8 August, having been rid of decorative elements and armed with guns, she was sent on patrol. On 22 August, she collided with a liner named Canadian. Shortly after, the Admiralty found that large liners were too expensive to operate as cruisers. On 30 September, she was repaired, disarmed, and returned to Cunard Line.

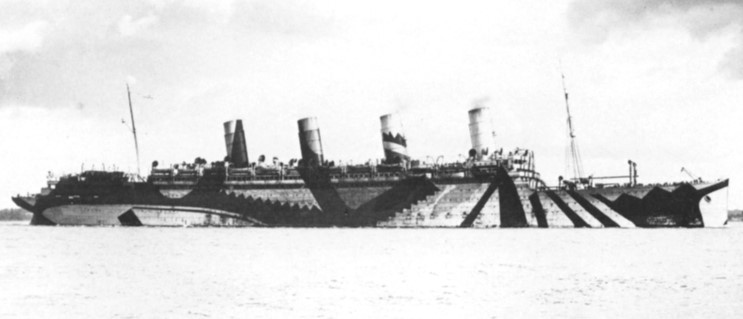
Aquitania as a troopship in dazzle paint scheme, photographed at Halifax in 1918.

After being idle for a time, in the spring of 1915 she was recalled by the Admiralty and converted into a troopship, and made voyages to the Dardanelles, sometimes running alongside Britannic or Mauretania. Around 30,000 men were transported on the ship to the battlefield between May and August of that year. Aquitania then was converted into a hospital ship, and acted in that role during the Dardanelles campaign. In 1916, the year that White Star's flagship, and one of Aquitania's main rivals, Britannic, was sunk, Aquitania was returned to the trooping front, and then in 1917 was laid up in the Solent. In 1918, now under the command of James Charles, the ship was back on the high seas in troopship service, conveying North American troops to Britain. Many of these departures were from the port of Halifax, Nova Scotia where the ship's dazzle paint scheme was captured by artists and photographers, including Antonio Jacobsen. On one occasion Aquitania transported over 8,000 men. During her nine voyages, she transported approximately a total of 60,000 men. During this period, she collided with USS Shaw and tore apart its bow. The accident killed a dozen members of the American ship's crew.

After the end of the war, in December 1918, Aquitania was dismissed from military service. She collided with the British cargo ship Lord Dufferin at New York in the United States on 28 February 1919. Lord Dufferin sank and Aquitania rescued her crew. Lord Dufferin was later refloated and beached.

== Interwar career ==
In June 1919, Aquitania ran a Cunard "austerity service" between Southampton, Cherbourg, and New York. In December of that year Aquitania was docked at the Armstrong Whitworth yards in Newcastle to be refitted for post-war service. The ship was converted from coal burner to oil-fired, which greatly reduced the number of engine room crew required. The original fittings and art pieces, removed when refitted for military use, were brought out of storage and re-installed. At some point during this time, a new wheelhouse was constructed above the original one as the officers had complained about the visibility over the ship's bow. The second wheelhouse can be seen in later pictures of the era and the original wheelhouse area below had the windows plated in.

=== 1920s ===
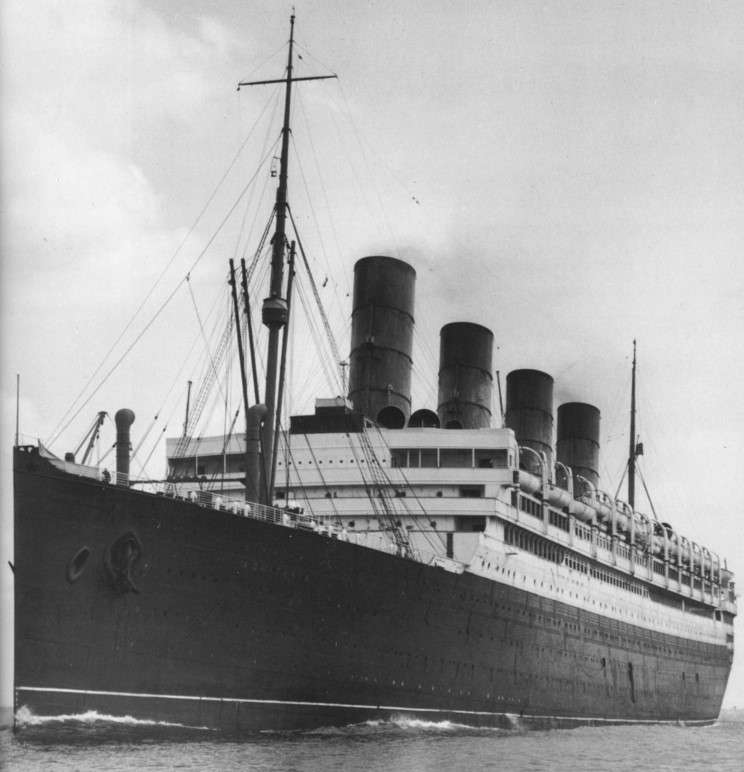
Aquitania after her 1920 refit. This photograph was taken in the 1930s.

Aquitania resumed her commercial service on 17 July 1920, leaving from Liverpool with 2,433 passengers on board. The crossing was a success; the ship maintained good speed while showing that now being oil-fueled was much cheaper than coal-fueled propulsion. The ship's arrival in New York Harbor was filmed as part of the pioneering 1921 documentary Manhatta, in which she is seen being pushed to her destination by tugboats. The months that followed were just as promising, despite a stewards' strike in May 1921. At the beginning of the decade, Aquitania was the only large liner in the service of Cunard Line, as Mauretania was undergoing repairs after a fire. The year 1921 was thus an exceptional year for her; she crossed the Atlantic 30 times (15 round trips) and broke a record by transporting a total of 60,587 passengers that year (including 26,331 in third class), averaging more than 2,000 passengers per crossing. In the following year, Mauretania rejoined her in Cunard service. Aquitania operated in service with Mauretania and Berengaria (formerly the German liner Imperator) in a trio known as "The Big Three."

In 1924, a new restriction on immigration was passed in the United States, causing the number of third-class passengers to decline significantly. From more than 26,000 third-class passengers transported by Aquitania in 1921, the figure fell to about 8,200 third-class passengers in 1925. The number of crew was thus reduced to around 850 people from the original 1,200. The third class was no longer the key to the profitability of the liner, and so the company had to adapt. The third-class gradually became a tourist class, which offered decent service at a low price. In 1926, the ship underwent a major overhaul, which reduced the passenger capacity from around 3,300 to around 2,200.

Still, the Cunard Line benefited from prohibition in the United States, which started in 1919. American liners were legally part of the territory of the United States, and thus alcoholic beverages could not be served on them. Passengers who wanted to drink therefore travelled on British liners in order to do so. Aquitania enjoyed great success, making much profit for her company. In 1929, she underwent a major refit. A bathroom was added to many first-class cabins, and the tourist class was renovated. While new competitors, such as the German liner SS Bremen, entered service, Aquitania remained particularly popular after fifteen years of service.

=== Crisis of 1929 and its consequences ===
Following the stock market crash of 1929, many ships were affected by the economic downturn and reduced traffic. Aquitania found herself in a tough position. Only a few could afford expensive passage on her now, so Cunard sent Aquitania on cheap cruises to the Mediterranean. These voyages were successful, especially for Americans who went on "booze cruises" to escape prohibition. Compounding this was Cunard losing the Blue Riband, and many customers, to the new Norddeutscher Lloyd liners SS Bremen and SS Europa. Between 1929 and 1934, the number of passengers Aquitania carried declined from 30,000 to roughly 13,000. The ship, however, remained popular and she was the third busiest Atlantic liner in the early 1930s behind Bremen and Europa.

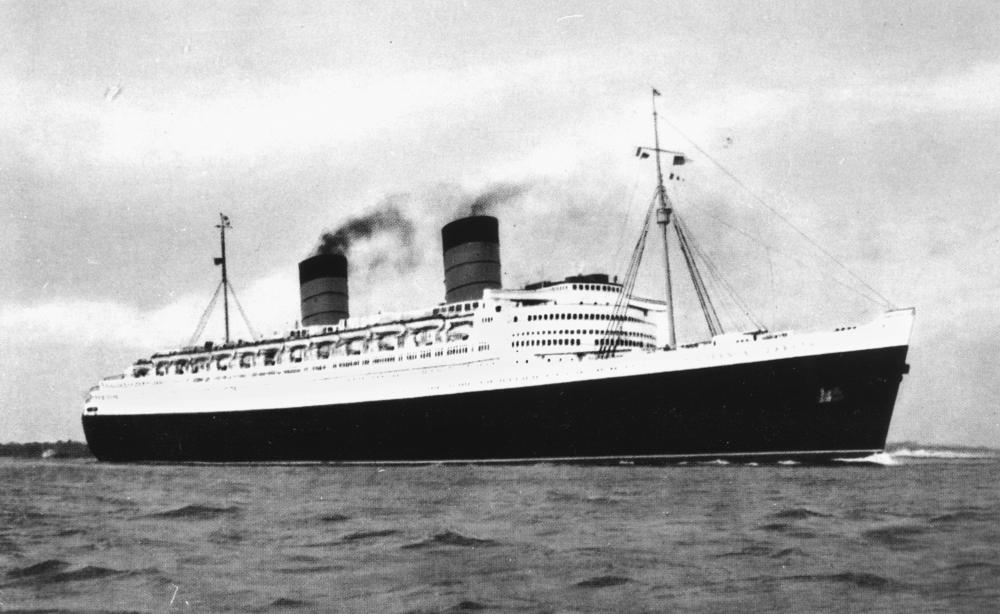
RMS Queen Elizabeth, the ocean liner intended to replace Aquitania upon her arrival in 1940

To keep the ship up to date, she underwent a refit, which added a cinema, between 1932 and 1933. At the same time, in order to modernize its fleet, Cunard ordered the new RMS Queen Mary. The Great Depression, however, prevented the company from being able to fully finance the construction, and Cunard merged with its rival, the White Star Line, in 1934 in order to do so. Queen Mary entered service in 1936. Author C. R. Bonsor writing in 1963 states, "from 1936 on it became necessary to squeeze the maximum speed out of Aquitania in order to make her a suitable running mate for Queen Mary thus 24 knot passages became regular".

Aquitania ran aground in the Solent on 24 January 1934 but was refloated later the same day. The merger of the two companies into Cunard-White Star Line resulted in a large surplus of liners being owned by a single company. Thus, most of the older fleet, including Mauretania and Olympic, were removed from service immediately and soon scrapped. However, Aquitania was retained, despite her age. On 10 April 1935, Aquitania went hard aground on Thorne Knoll in the Solent near Southampton, England, but with the aid of ten tugboats, on the next high tide the ship was freed. When the new liner RMS Queen Elizabeth was due to enter service in 1940, newspapers speculated that Aquitania would be retired that year, with Queen Elizabeth replacing her on the North Atlantic route. However, Aquitania's performance continued to satisfy her company. This, combined with the breakout of the Second World War, meant the old ocean liner would remain in service for another decade. The year 1939 saw an increase in the number of wealthy passengers on board. The ship was then already 26 years old.

== World War II service ==
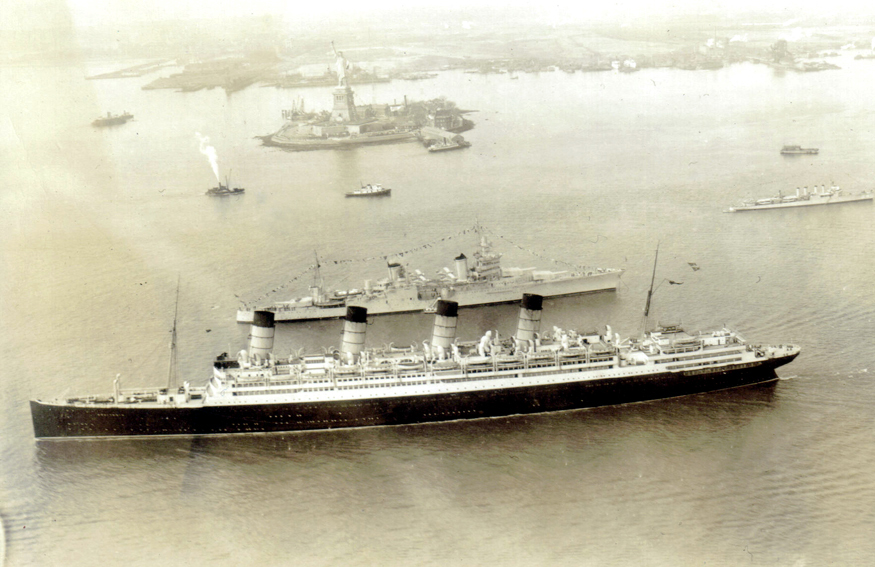
Aquitania passing USS Indianapolis in New York Harbor.

Aquitania, with a normal troop capacity of 7,400, was among the select group of large, fast former passenger ships capable of sailing independently without escort transporting large numbers of troops that were assigned worldwide as needed. These ships, often termed "Monsters" until London requested the term be dropped, were Aquitania, Queen Mary, Queen Elizabeth, Mauretania (II), Île de France and Nieuw Amsterdam with "lesser monsters" being other large ex-liners capable of independent sailing with large troop capacity that accounted for much of the troop capacity and deployment, particularly in the early days of the war.

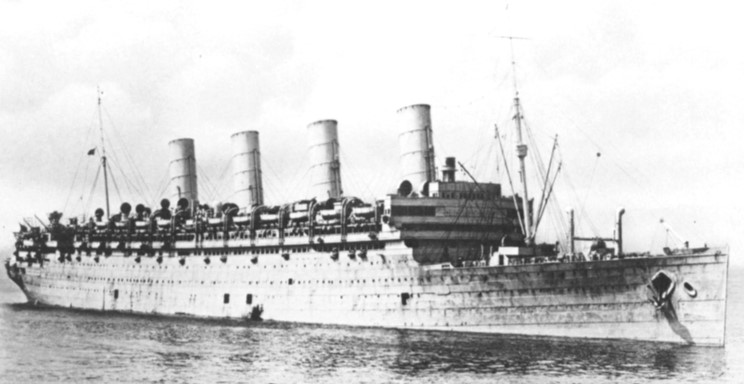
Aquitania during World War Two.

Plans to replace Aquitania with the newer Queen Elizabeth in 1940 had been forestalled by outbreak of World War II in 1939. On 16 September 1939 Aquitania, awaiting initial refit as a troop ship, was at pier 90 in New York along with Queen Mary while nearby, at pier 88, were the French ships Île de France and Normandie. She returned to Southampton and was requisitioned on 18 November.

Aquitania's initial troop transport operation was taking Canadian troops to Scotland, Convoy TC1 in company with Empress of Britain, Empress of Australia, Duchess of Bedford, Monarch of Bermuda, HMS Hood, HMS Warspite, HMS Barham, HMS Resolution, HMS Repulse, HMS Furious, December 1939. Meanwhile, a massive transport of Australian and New Zealand troops to Suez and North Africa, with possible diversion to the United Kingdom if events required, was in planning with the numbered convoys to be designated as "US" with the large Atlantic liners assigned a role. The fast convoy designated as US.3 was composed of Aquitania and the liners Queen Mary, Mauretania, Empress of Britain, Empress of Canada, Empress of Japan, and Andes. Aquitania, Empress of Britain, and Empress of Japan, after embarking New Zealand troops at Wellington in May, sailed escorted by HMAS Canberra, HMAS Australia, and HMNZS Leander to join the Australian component off Sydney on 5 May 1940. Joined off Sydney by Queen Mary and Mauretania the convoy sailed the same day to be joined the next by Empress of Canada from Melbourne for a stop at Fremantle 10–12 May before the voyage intended to be for Colombo. About midway to Colombo, on 15 May, the convoy was rerouted due to the rapid German penetrations into France with the ultimate destination of Gourock, Scotland via Cape Town, South Africa and Freetown, Sierra Leone where the escort strengthened by various ships including the aircraft carriers HMS Hermes and HMS Argus and the battlecruiser HMS Hood. The convoy arrived in the Clyde and anchored off Gourock on 16 June 1940.

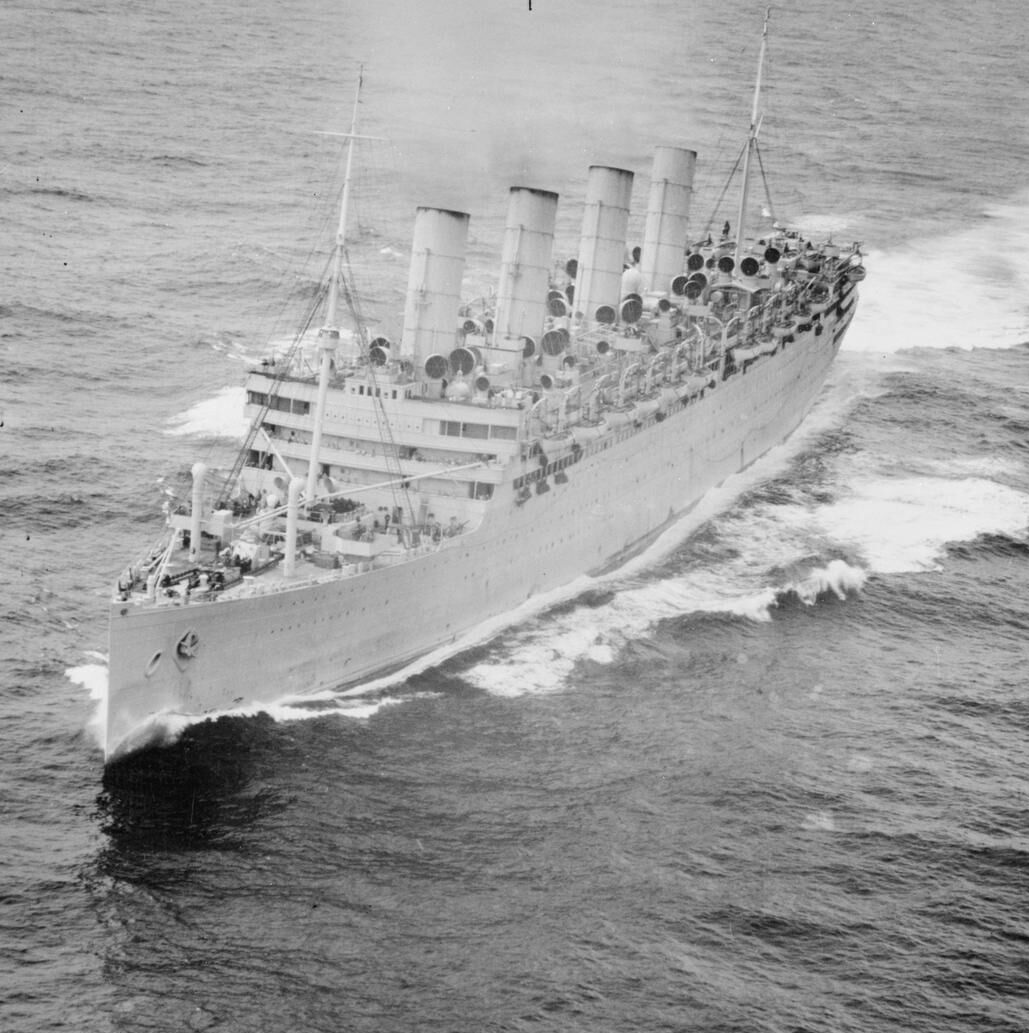
Aquitania painted grey during World War II.

Now repainted battleship grey, in November 1941 Aquitania was in the British colony of Singapore, from which she sailed to take part indirectly in the loss of the Australian cruiser HMAS Sydney. Sydney had engaged in battle with the German auxiliary cruiser Kormoran. There has been much unsubstantiated speculation that Kormoran was expecting Aquitania, after spies in Singapore had notified Kormoran's crew of the liner's sailing and planned to ambush her in the Indian Ocean west of Perth but instead encountered Sydney on 19 November. Both ships were lost after a fierce battle. On the morning of 24 November Aquitania en route to Sydney from Singapore spotted and picked up twenty-six survivors of the German ship but maintained radio silence and did not pass word until in visual range of Wilson's Promontory on 27 November. The captain had gone against orders not to stop for survivors of sinkings. There were no survivors from Sydney.

December saw the outbreak of war in the Pacific, then Japanese advances throughout Southeast Asia and toward Australia, necessitating the redeployment of defensive forces. On 28 December Aquitania and two smaller transports departed Sydney with 4,150 Australian troops and 10,000 tons of equipment for Port Moresby, New Guinea. (On the same date, USS Houston and other U.S. ships evacuating from the north reached Darwin, with USS Pensacola, and elements of her diverted Philippine convoy some 260 nautical miles (300 mi; 480 km) ahead.) Aquitania was back in Sydney on 8 January 1942. The next effort was reinforcement of Singapore and the Netherlands East Indies with Aquitania transporting Australian troops (whose equipment was in Convoy MS.1) as the single ship MS.2 convoy, under escort of HMAS Canberra. The ship had been the only suitable transport for such a large movement. Originally, transport directly to Singapore was considered, but the danger from aircraft to such a valuable asset and so many troops caused a change of plans. Instead, Aquitania departed Sydney on 10 January, reaching Ratai Bay at the Sunda Strait on 20 January, where 3,456 personnel (including some Navy, Air Force and civilians) were transhipped under a covering naval force to seven smaller vessels (six of them Dutch KPM ships) that would continue to Singapore as convoy MS.2A. Aquitania was returned to Sydney on 31 January.

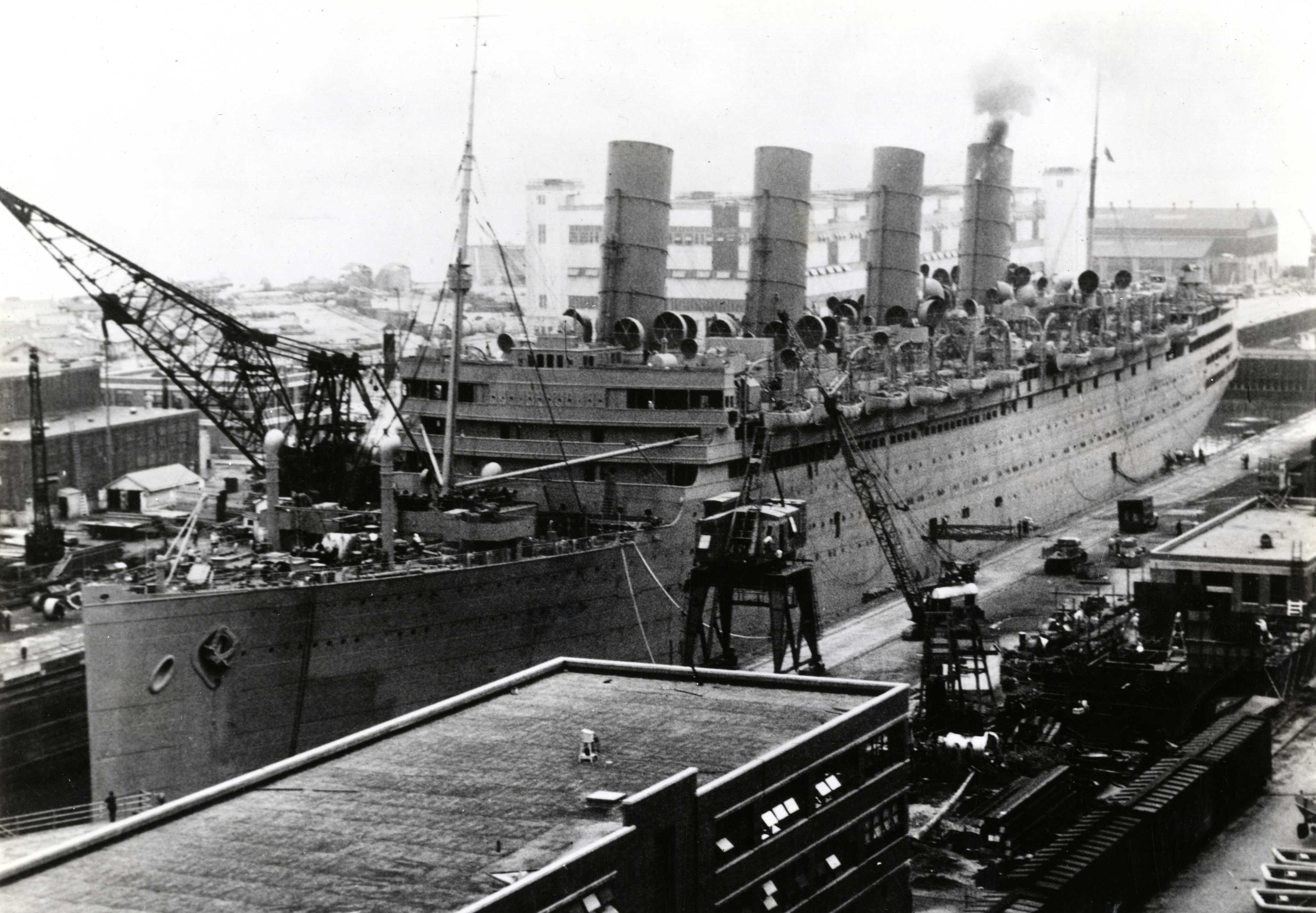
Aquitania at Boston Naval Shipyard, September 1942.

With the United States in the war, Aquitania (then with a troop capacity of 4,500) had been scheduled for transport duties from the United States to Australia in February, but necessary repairs delayed that. Because her deep draft was hazardous in Australian and intermediate ports in the Pacific Islands, she spent March and April 1942 transporting troops from the west coast of the U.S. to Hawaii. Then Aquitania was temporarily transferred from Pacific duties to support the movement of troops from the United States to Britain, sailing 30 April from New York in a large convoy that transported some 19,000 troops. On 12 May 1942 Aquitania loaded troops at Gourock destined for the war in the Middle East, departing in convoy WS19P on 1 June with destroyers and heavy weather, she broke off independently on 7 June due to her greater speed with designation WS19Q. The first port of call was 48 hours at Freetown (West Africa) on 11 June, then 3 days at Simonstown, South Africa 20 June 48 hours at Diego Suarez, Madagascar from 30 June 24 hours at Steamer Point, Aden on 3 July, and then disembarkation at Port Tewfik, Egypt from 8 July 1942. The return journey was via Diego Suarez, Cape Town, Freetown and then to Boston. By September Aquitania was engaged in a triangular troop deployment of United States-United Kingdom-Indian Ocean voyages.

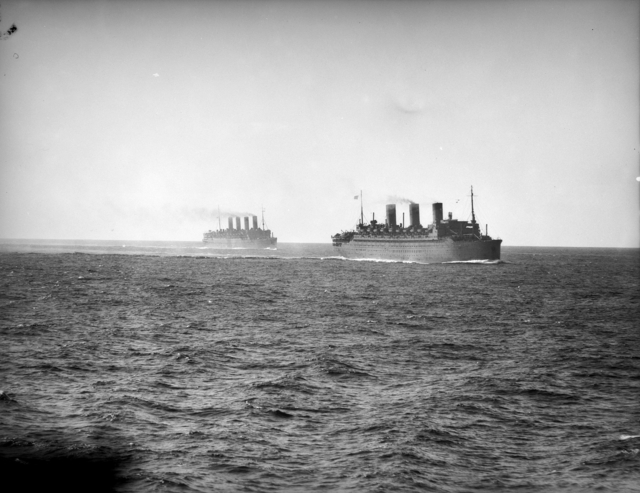
Aquitania (left) and SS Île de France during Operation Pamphlet.

As part of the major redeployment of Australian troops from North Africa to the defence of Australia and start of offensive operations in the Southwest Pacific. Aquitania, Queen Mary, Île de France, Nieuw Amsterdam, and the armed merchant cruiser HMS Queen of Bermuda transported the Australian 9th Division to Sydney in Operation Pamphlet during January and February 1943.

By the buildup for the invasion of Europe in 1944 troop deployments to Britain depended heavily on Aquitania and the other "Monsters" and no allowance could be made for interruption of their service for other transport requirements.

Wartime embarkation at New York is described in some detail in the description of the departure of the Special Navy Advance Group 56 (SNAG 56) that was to become Navy Base Hospital Number 12 at the Royal Victoria Hospital, Netley, England, to receive casualties from Normandy. The unit was sent by "devious routes" by train to Jersey City where under cover of darkness they boarded a ferry crossing to the covered pier 86 in New York where a band played and the Red Cross served their last coffee and doughnuts as they boarded "N.Y. 40", the New York Port of Embarkation code designation for Aquitania, which got underway the morning of 29 January 1944 with some 1,000 Navy and 7,000 Army personnel for arrival at Gourock, Scotland 5 February.

In eight years of military work, Aquitania sailed more than 500,000 miles, and carried nearly 400,000 soldiers, to and from places as far afield as New Zealand, Australia, the South Pacific, Greece and the Indian Ocean. Cunard historian Michael Gallagher said: "Wartime Prime Minister Winston Churchill credited Aquitania, with Queen Mary and Queen Elizabeth, for shortening World War II in Europe by a year."

== Postwar service and retirement ==
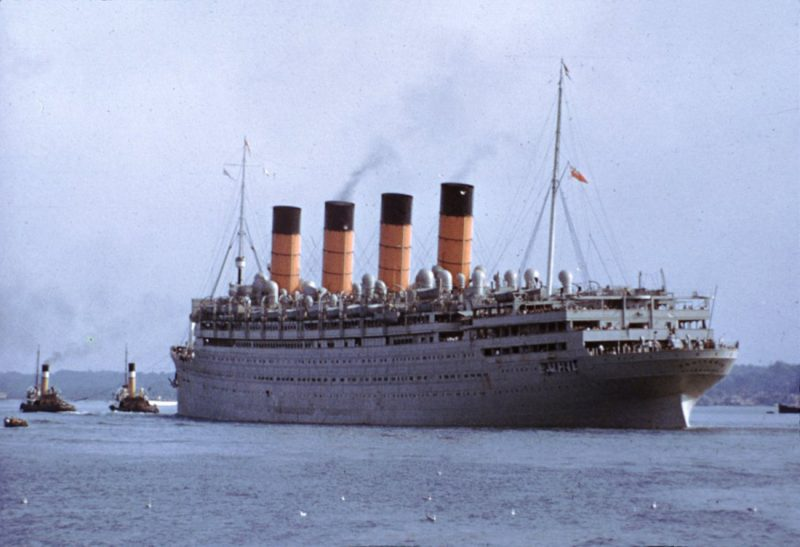
1947: Aquitania in her final years, sporting her wartime grey with uniquely painted Cunard funnels.

After completing troopship service, the vessel was handed back to Cunard-White Star in 1948. She underwent a refit for passenger service. She was then used to transport war brides and their children to Canada under charter from the Canadian government. This final service created a special fondness for Aquitania in Halifax, Nova Scotia, the port of disembarkation for these immigration voyages.

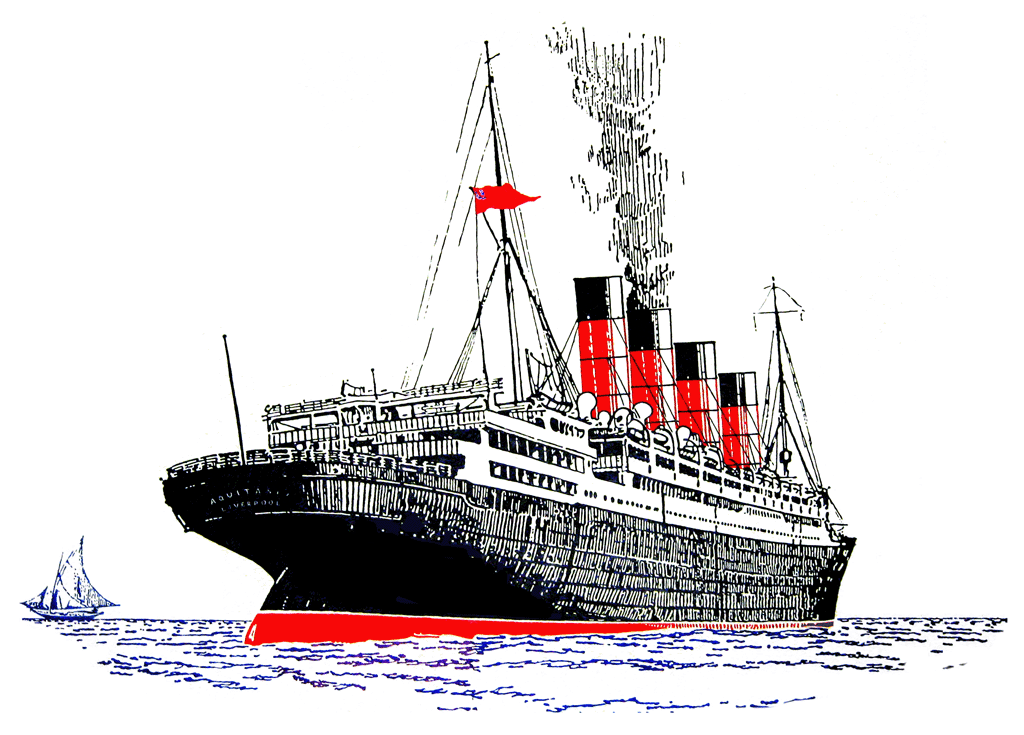
Mural of Aquitania, the "Ship Beautiful".

Aquitania sailed on her last commercial voyage from Halifax to Southampton, from 24 November 1949 to 1 December 1949. After serving her purpose, the old Aquitania was taken out of service in December 1949, when the ship's Board of Trade certificate was not renewed as the condition of the ship had deteriorated, and it would have been cost-prohibitive to be brought up to new safety standards, namely fire code regulations. The decks leaked in bad weather the bulkheads and funnels where rusted and weakened to a point a hole could be kicked through.

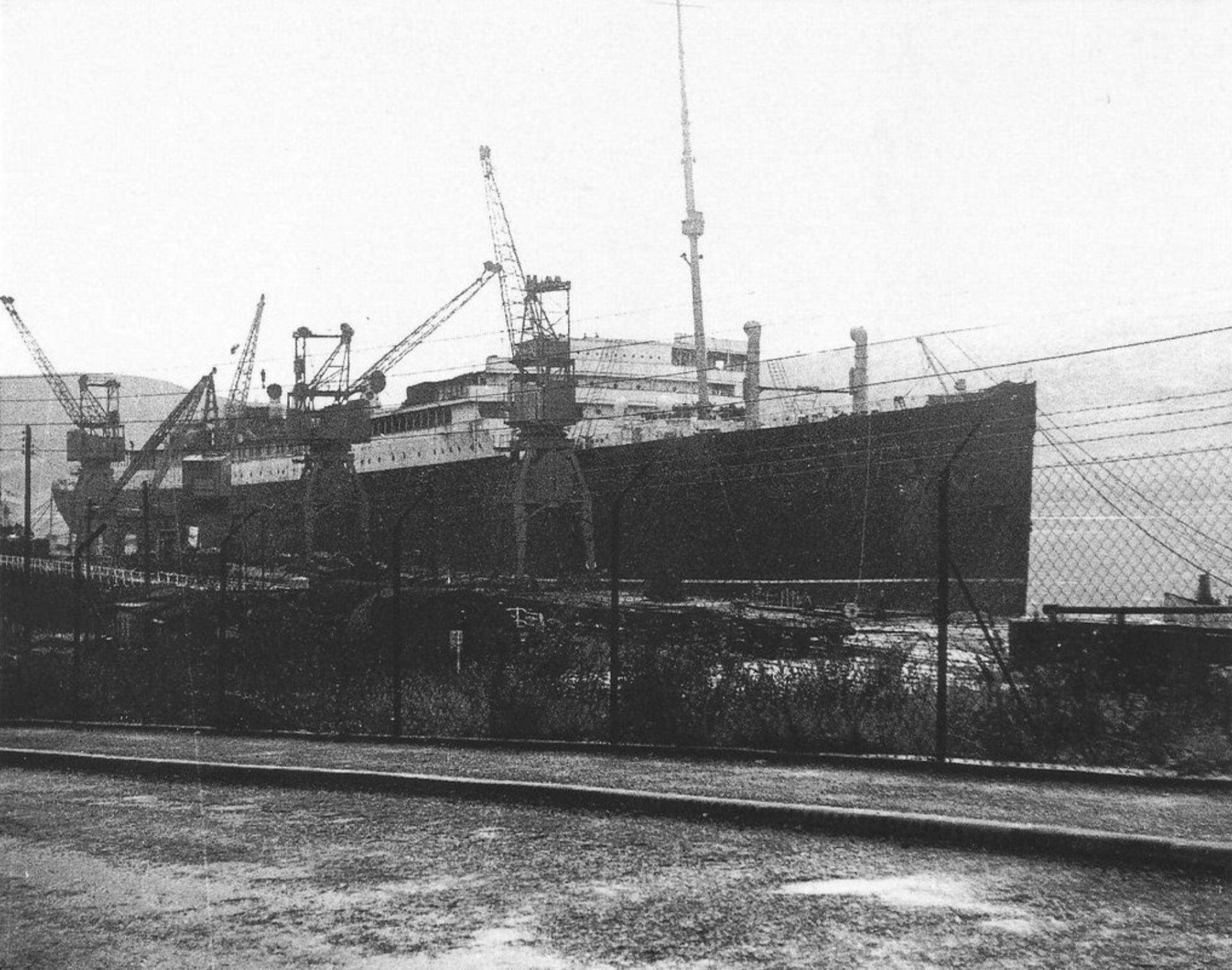
Aquitania being scrapped in Faslane, Scotland in 1950.

After her last voyage in February 1950 from Southampton to Faslane, the vessel was sold to British Iron and Steel Corporation for scrap for £125,000 at Faslane in Scotland. Dismantling took more than a year and was finished in November 1951. This ended a career which included steaming 3 million miles over 450 round voyages. Aquitania carried 1.2 million passengers through an active sea career that spanned nearly 36 years, making her the longest-serving Express Liner of the 20th century. Aquitania was the only major liner and was history's largest ship to serve in both World Wars. She was also the last four-funnelled passenger ship to be scrapped. The ship's wheel and a detailed scale model of Aquitania may be seen in the Cunard exhibit at the Maritime Museum of the Atlantic in Halifax.

Maritime author N. R. P. Bonsor wrote of Aquitania in 1963: "Cunard had recovered possession of their veteran in 1948 but she was not worth reconditioning. In 35 years of service Aquitania had sailed more than 3 million miles and apart from one or two early Allan Line steamers no other ship served for as long in a single ownership."

== Gallery ==
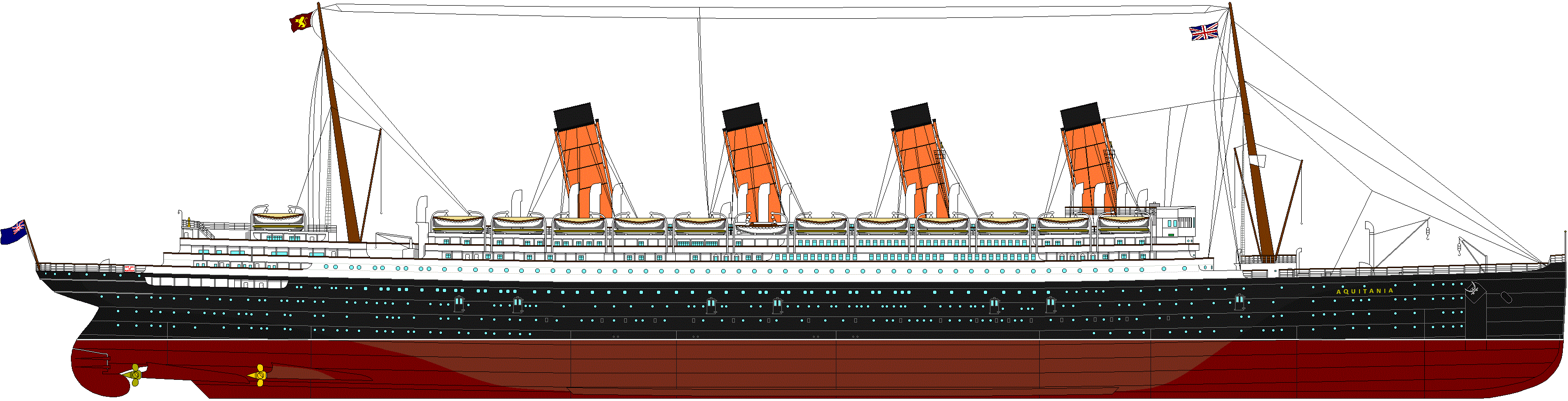
A naval drawing of RMS Aquitania in her original 1914 appearance (starboard profile).

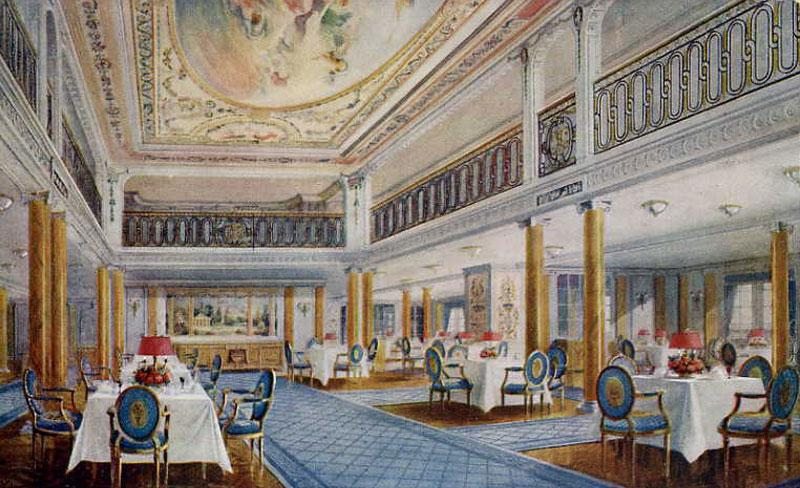
Aquitania's First Class Dining Room.

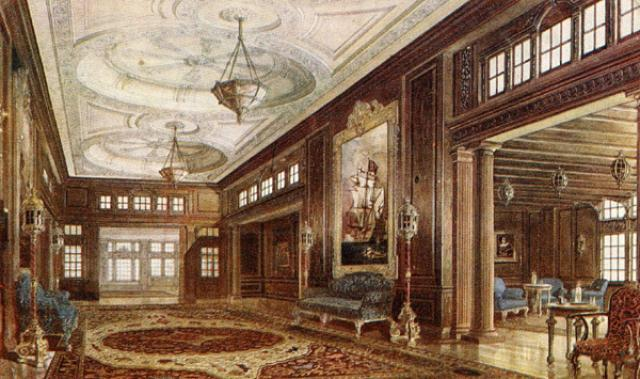
Aquitania's First Class Smoking Room.

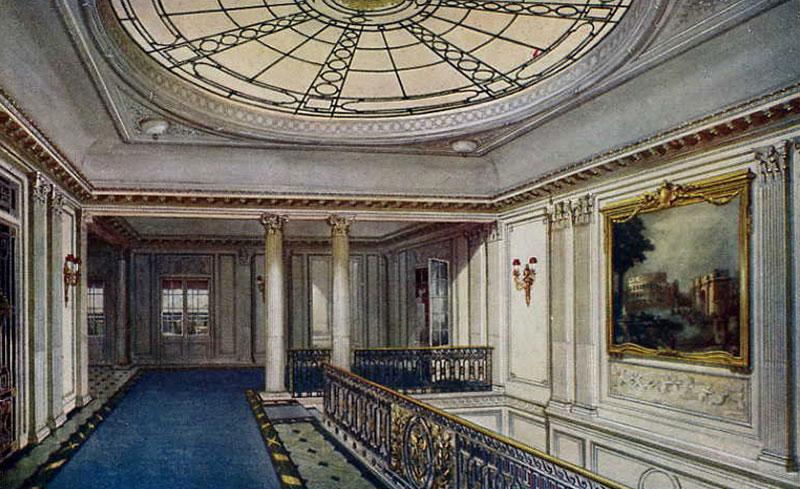
Aquitania's First Class Staircase.

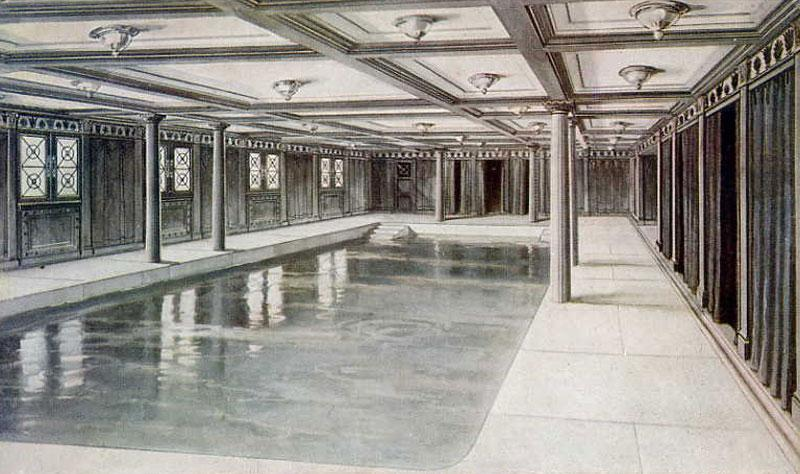
Aquitania's First Class Swimming Pool.

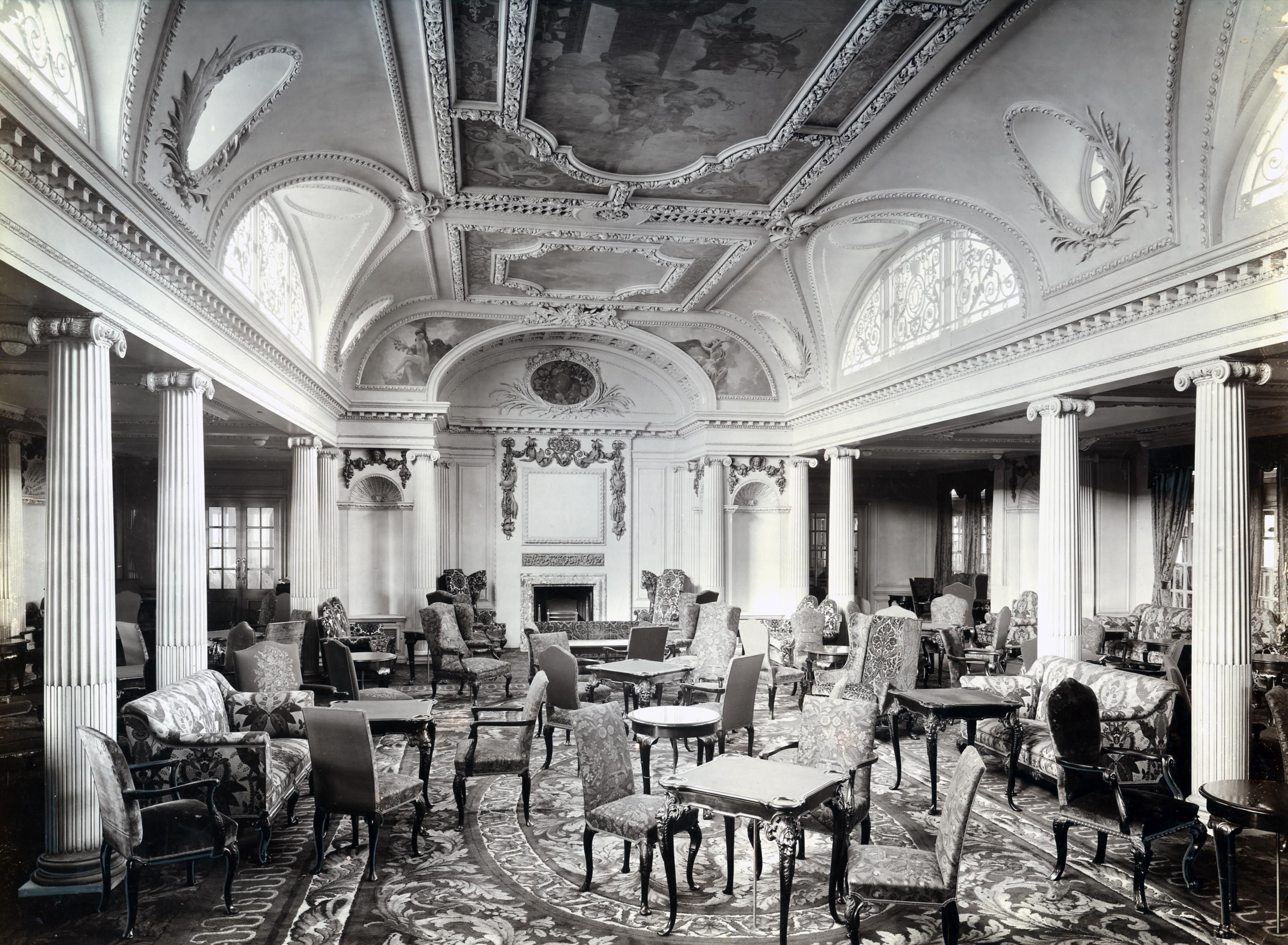
Aquitania's First Class Lounge.

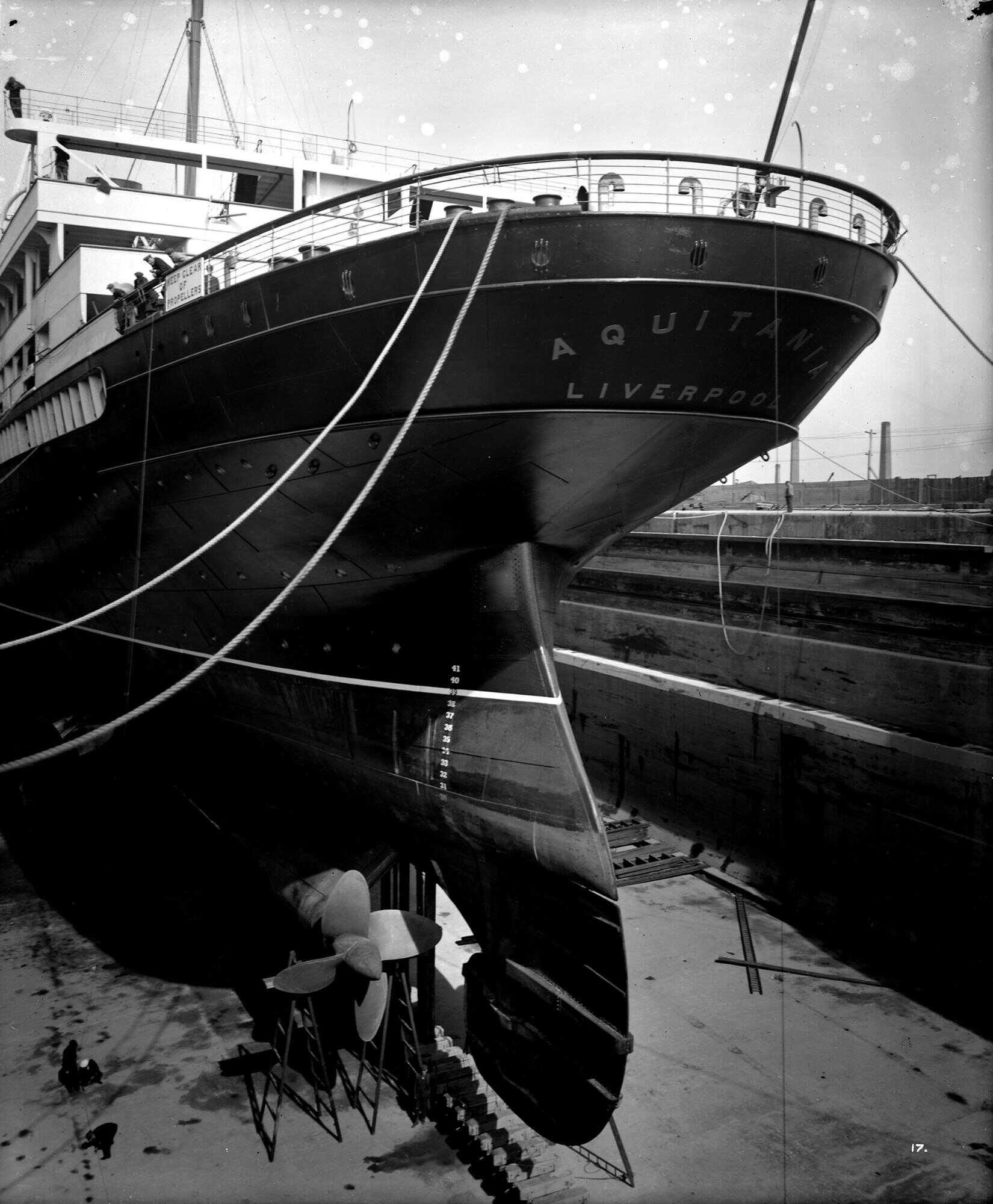
RMS Aquitania, stern view. This photograph was taken in early May 1914, shortly before the ship's maiden voyage later that month.

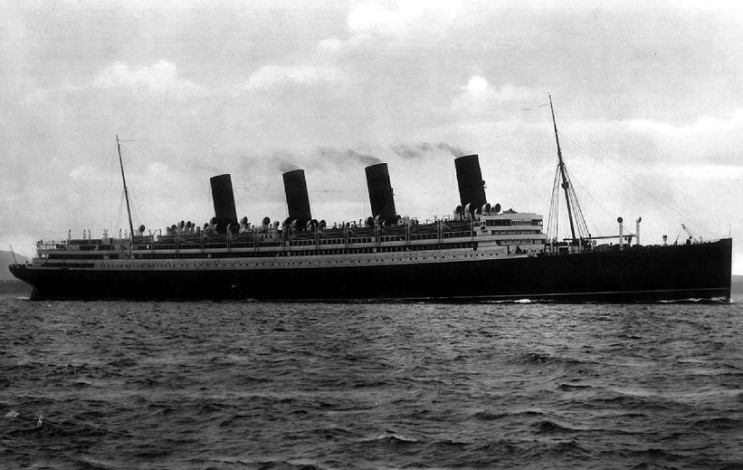
RMS Aquitania as built in 1914.

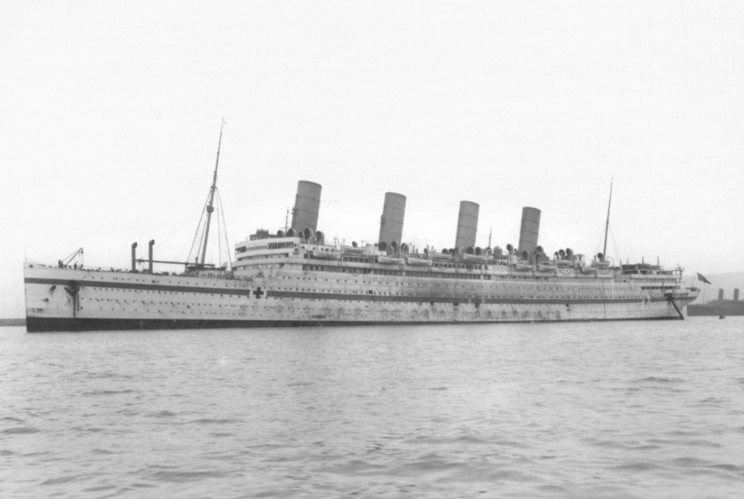
HMHS Aquitania seen in 1916 as a hospital ship during The Great War.

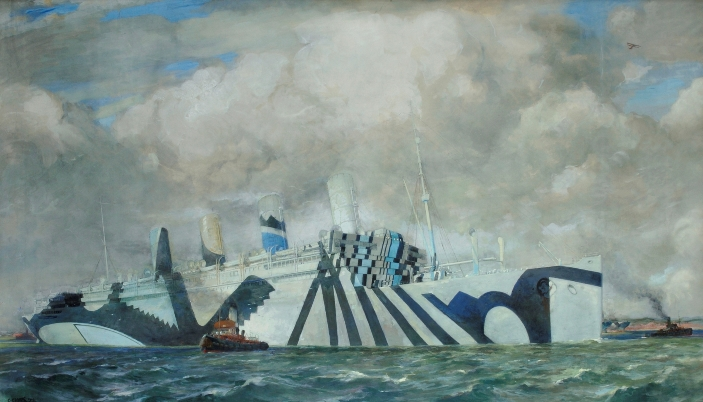
A drawing of HMT Aquitania in her own unique dazzle scheme during World War I.

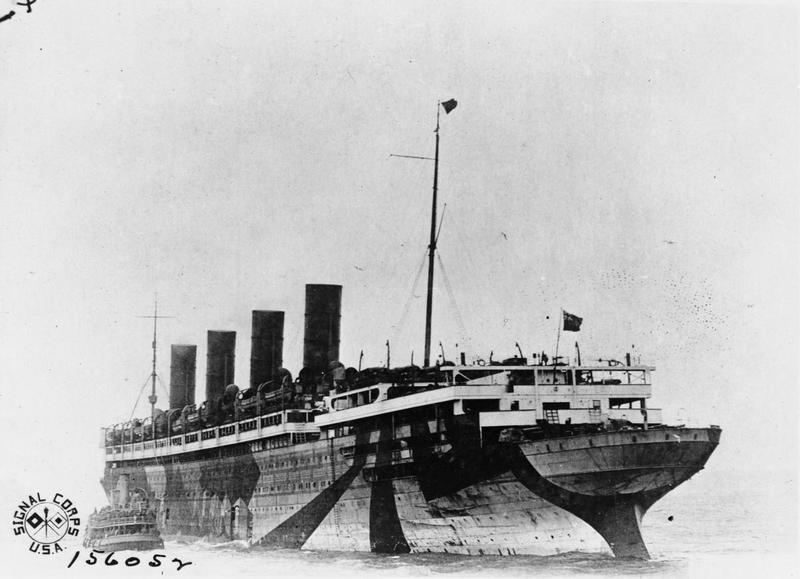
RMS Aquitania photographed on February 22 1919. She is still painted in her unique WW1 dazzle scheme.

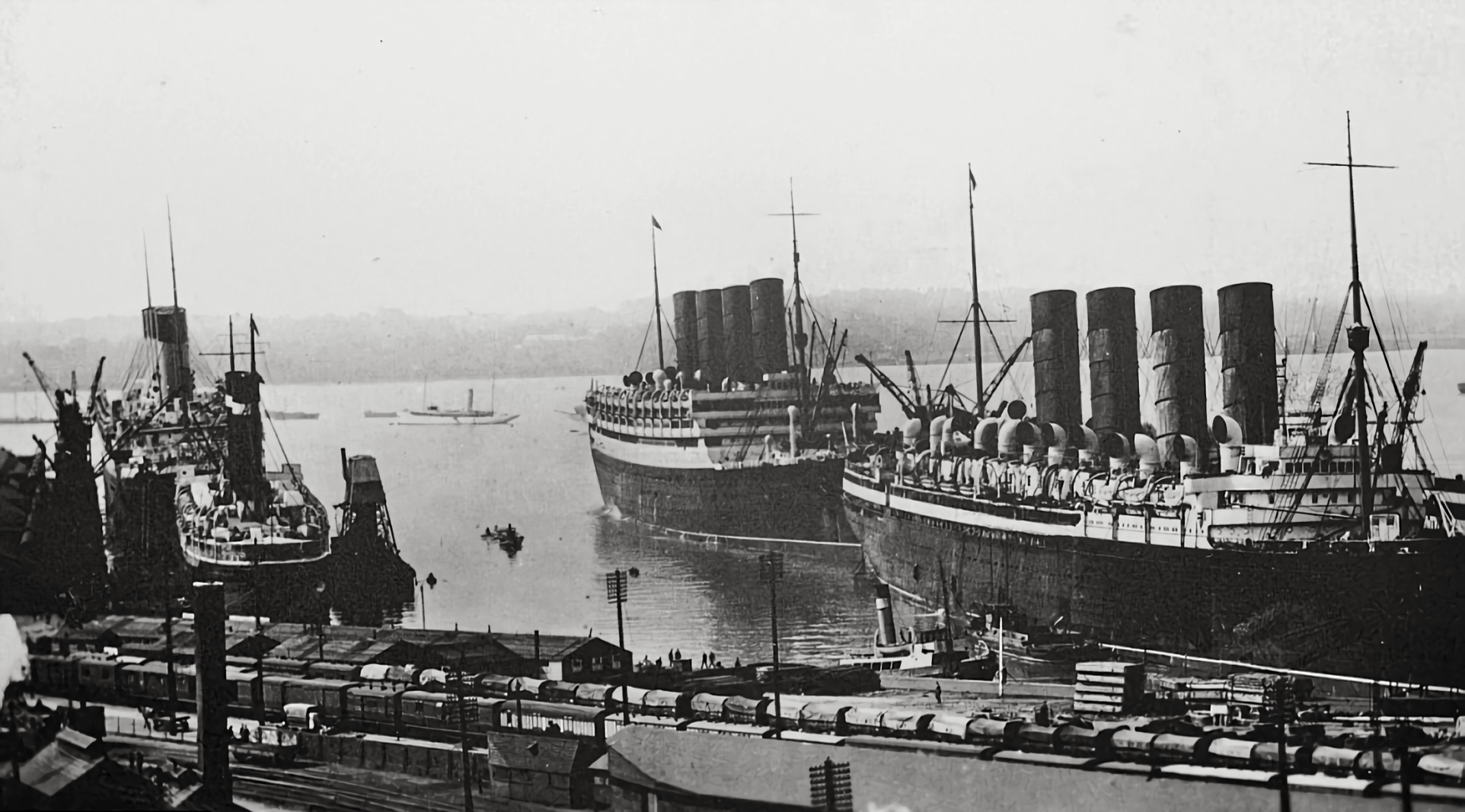
RMS Aquitania seen with one of her running mates, RMS Mauretania (right in front), and the White Star Liner RMS Olympic (far left) at Southampton, early 1920s.

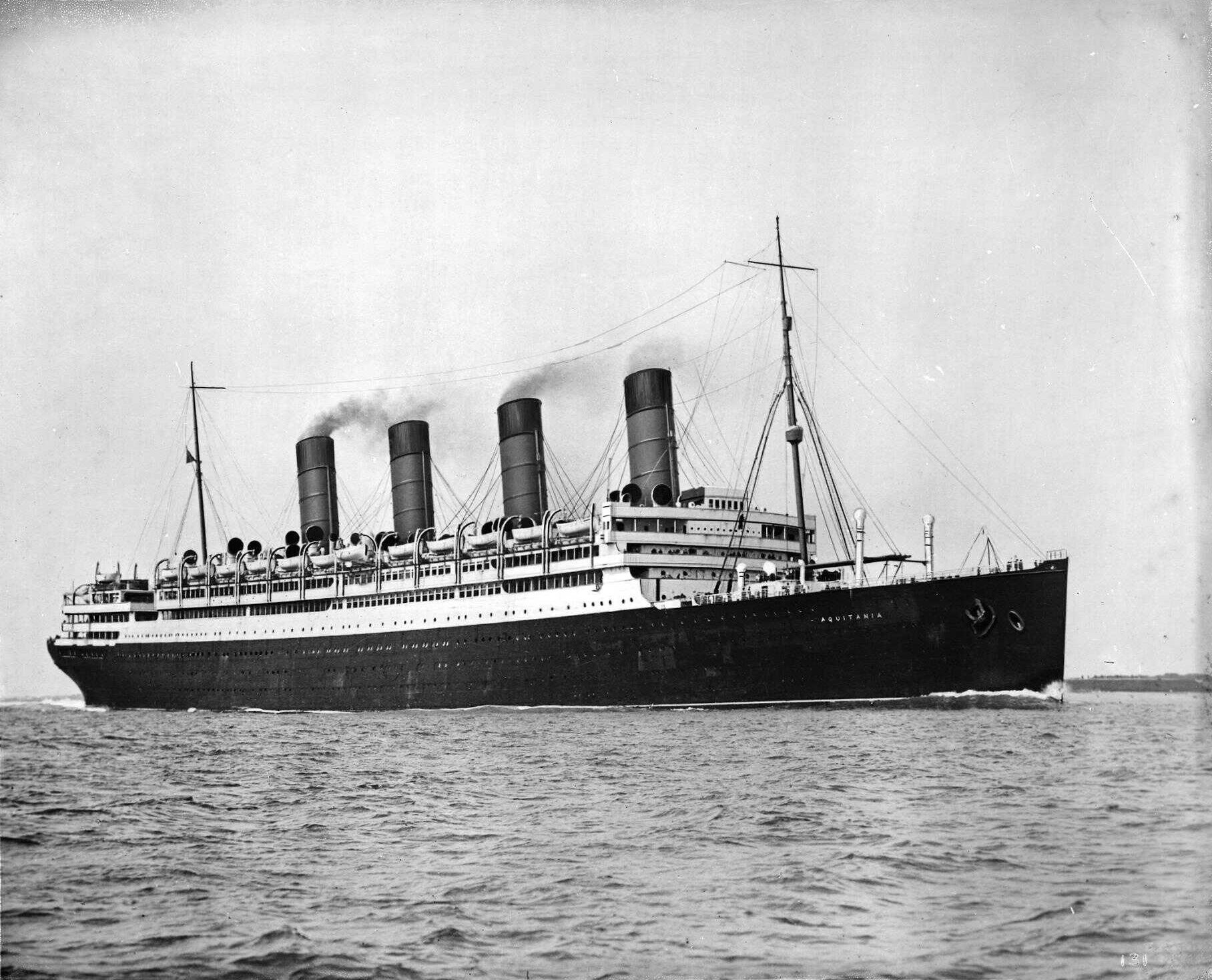
RMS Aquitania in the late 1920s.

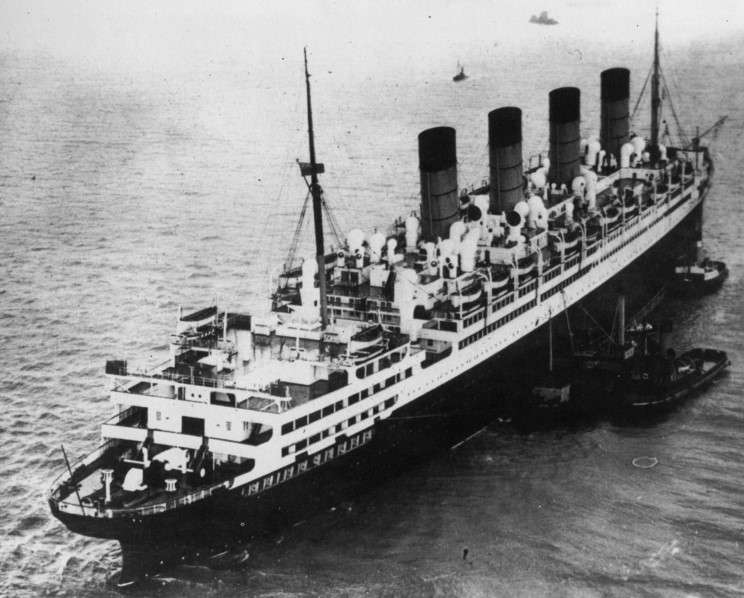
RMS Aquitania grounded hard on Thorne Knoll near Southampton, April 1935.

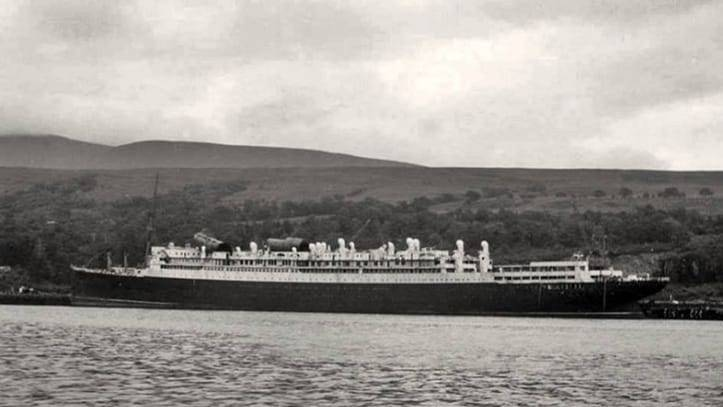
RMS Aquitania photographed while being scrapped, late 1950.

== Bibliography ==
- Chirnside, Mark (2008). RMS Aquitania: The Ship Beautiful. The History Press. ISBN 9-780752-444444.
- Gill, G. Hermon (1957). Royal Australian Navy, 1939–1942. Australia in the War of 1939–1945. Series 2 – Navy. Vol. 1. Canberra: Australian War Memorial. OCLC 848228.
- Gill, G. Hermon (1968). Royal Australian Navy, 1939–1942. Australia in the War of 1939–1945. Series 2 – Navy. Vol. 2. Canberra: Australian War Memorial. OCLC 65475.
- Hudson, Henry W. (1946). The Story of SNAG 56. Cambridge, Mass.: Harvard University Press.
- "The New Cunard Express Liner Aquitania". International Marine Engineering. XIX (July 1914). Aldrich Publishing Company: 277–283. 1914.
- Layton, Kent; Fitch, Tad (2016). The Unseen Aquitania: the ship in rare illustrations. Stroud, Gloucestershire: The History Press. ISBN 978-0750967358.
- Leighton, Richard M; Coakley, Robert W (1968) [1st. Pub. 1955]. The War Department – Global Logistics And Strategy 1940–1943. United States Army in World War II. Vol. 1. Washington, DC: Center of Military History, United States Army. LCCN 55060001.
- Leighton, Richard M; Coakley, Robert W (1968) [1st. Pub. 1955]. The War Department – Global Logistics And Strategy 1943–1945. United States Army in World War II. Vol. 2. Washington, DC: Center of Military History, United States Army. LCCN 55060001.
- Le Goff, Olivier (1998). Les Plus Beaux Paquebots du Monde (in French). Solar. ISBN 978-2263027994.
- Navy Department – Headquarters of the Commander in Chief, United States Fleet; Commander, Tenth Fleet (1945). "United States Naval Administration in World War II – History of Convoy and Routing". Naval History & Heritage Command. Archived from the original on 8 November 2013.
- Osborne, Richard; Spong, Harry & Grover, Tom (2007). Armed Merchant Cruisers 1878–1945. Windsor, UK: World Warship Society. ISBN 978-0-9543310-8-5.
- Piouffre, Gérard (2009). Le Titanic ne répond plus (in French). Paris: Larousse. ISBN 978-2-03-584196-4.
