= Leonard Peskett =

English naval architect (1861–1924)

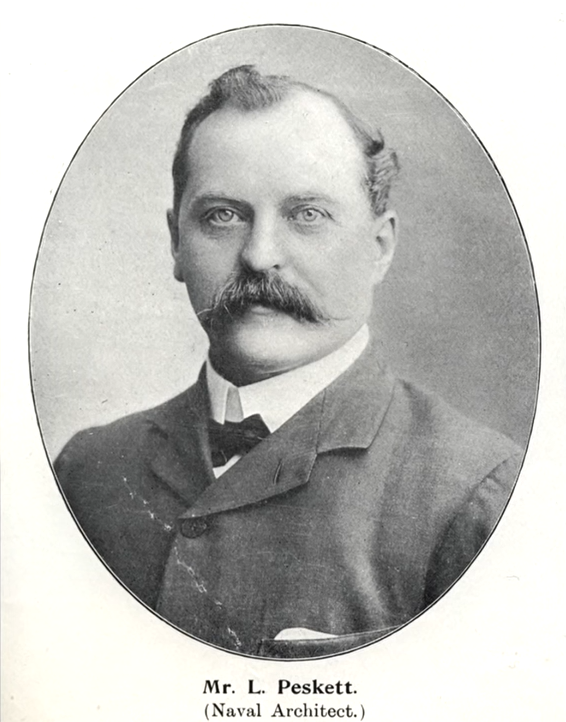
Peskett between 1895-1915

Leonard Peskett, OBE (1861 – 1924) was the Cunard Line's Senior naval architect, designer and the designer of the company's ocean liners RMS Mauretania, RMS Lusitania, RMS Aquitania, and the RMS Carmania.

Peskett came to Cunard in 1884 from H.M. Dockyard, where he had been an apprentice shipwright. He remained at Cunard until his death in 1924.

He is the author of the paper "The design of steamships from the owner's point of view," published in Transactions of the Institution of Naval Architects, London, 1914

== See also ==
- Thomas Andrews
- Stephen Payne
