= RMS Caronia =

RMS Caronia may refer to:

- RMS Caronia (1904), an ocean liner owned by Cunard Line 1904–1933
- RMS Caronia (1947), a combined ocean liner/cruise ship owned by Cunard Line 1948–1967

== See also ==
MS Caronia (previously Vistafjord), a cruise ship owned by Cunard Line 1983–2004
